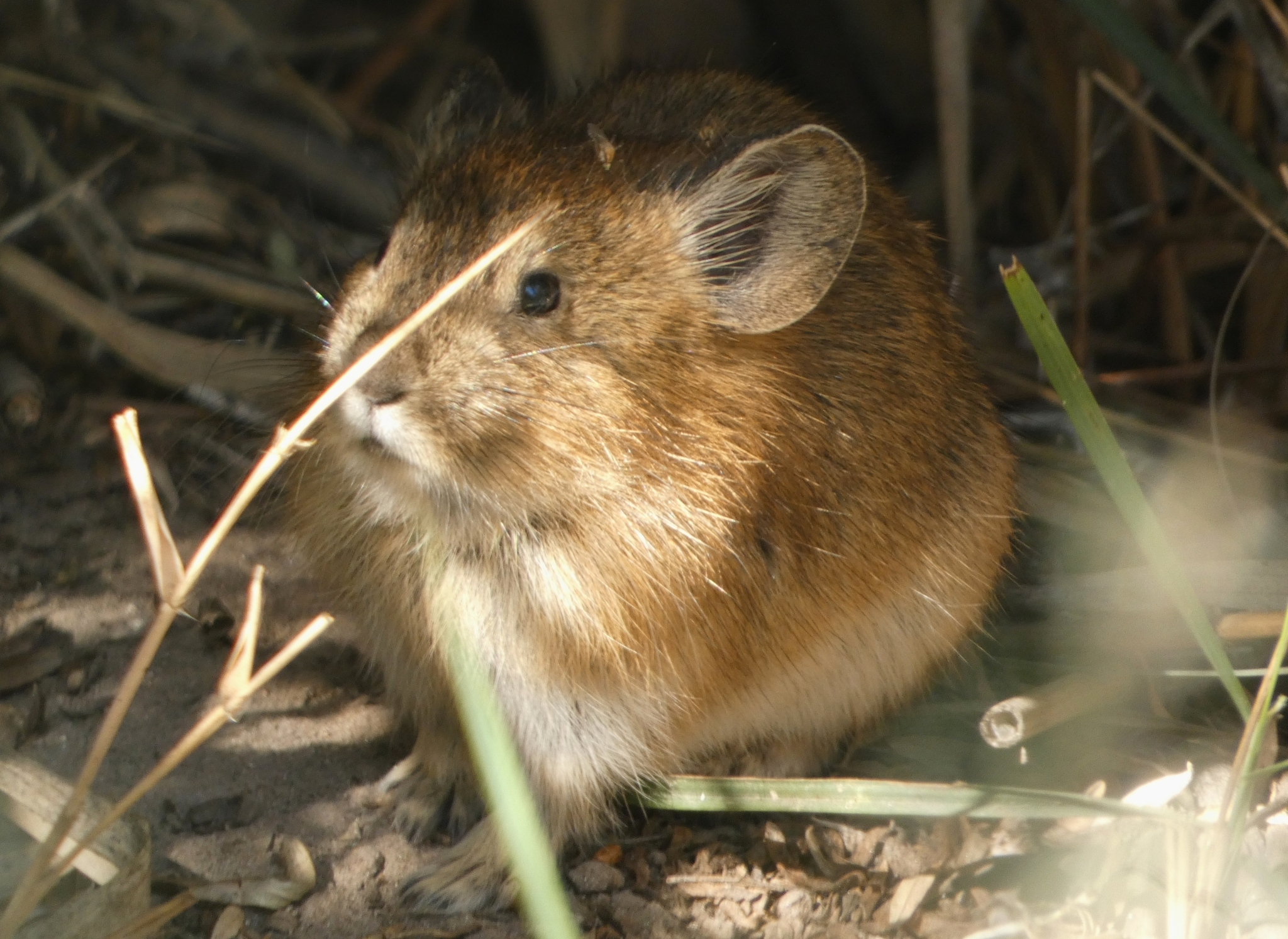
- Leh district, Ladakh, India

Conservation status
- Least Concern (IUCN 3.1)

Scientific classification
- Kingdom: Animalia
- Phylum: Chordata
- Class: Mammalia
- Infraclass: Placentalia
- Order: Lagomorpha
- Family: Ochotonidae
- Genus: Ochotona
- Species: O. nubrica

Binomial name
- Ochotona nubrica Thomas, 1922
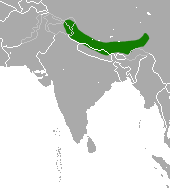
- Nubra pika range

Synonyms
- List: Lagomys hodgsoni Blyth, 1841; Ochotona pusilla nubrica Thomas, 1922; O. thibetana lhasaensis Feng Tsochien & Kao Yüehting, 1974; O. lama R. M. Mitchell & Punzo, 1976; O. thibetana aliensis Zheng Changlin, 1979; O. yarlungensis Liu Shaoying, Jin Wei, Liao Rui, & Sun Zhiyu in Liu Shaoying, Jin Wei, Liao Rui, Sun Zhiyu, Zeng Tao, Fu Jianrong, Liu Yang, Wang Xin, Li Panfeng, Tang Mingkun, Chen Limin, Dong Li, Han Mingde, & Gou Dan, 2017

= Nubra pika =

Species of mammal

The Nubra pika (Ochotona nubrica) (Chinese: 奴布拉鼠兔; pinyin: Núbùlā shǔtù) is a species of pika found in Bhutan, China, India, Nepal, and Pakistan. It is a small diurnal mammal with a fur coat that changes color across seasons and regions, ranging from gray to brownish red. It has blackish ears with a distinctive pale patch on the back, a very small tail, and a flat, narrow skull. It is closely related to the plateau pika and Sikkim pika, and is widely distributed across the Himalayas. It is among the burrowing species of pika, and eats a variety of plants. This pika's range overlaps with that of the Sikkim pika, one subspecies of Moupin pika, and the large-eared pika. One subspecies of the Nubra pika is restricted to part of the southeastern Tibet Autonomous Region.

The Nubra pika's taxonomy has changed several times over the period from its first description in 1922 up until 1992. It is named for the Nubra valley in Ladakh, India where it was first found. The International Union for Conservation of Nature (IUCN) and Chinese authorities list it as a least-concern species; its remoteness makes it hard to study and assess, but also makes it less likely to be threatened by human activity.

== Taxonomy ==
The Nubra pika was first described by Oldfield Thomas in 1922, who placed it in a group with Royle's pika (O. roylei), though these species are now known to belong to different subgenera. Thomas named it for its known habitat, the Nubra valley in Ladakh, India. The type locality where it was found was described as "Tuggur, Nubra Valley, Ladak" in what was then the princely state of Jammu and Kashmir.

It was later considered to be a synonym of various species in the pika genus, from the steppe pika (O. pusilla) in 1951, to Royle's pika in 1978, and finally to the Moupin pika (O. thibetana) in 1986 before being recognized as a distinct species once again by separate studies in 1990 and 1992. The nineteenth-century taxon Lagomys hodgsoni, named in 1841 by English zoologist Edward Blyth, was clarified to be a synonym of O. nubrica in 1993 by the American mammalogist Robert S. Hoffmann. It had previously been a synonym of O. roylei.

Currently, the Nubra pika is placed in the subgenus Ochotona. Its closest relative within the pikas may be the plateau pika (O. curzoniae), based on mitochondrial DNA evidence. The plateau pika apparently hybridizes with the Nubra pika, which has led to mixing in their haplotypes (lines of descent based on specific alleles), though the two species have distinct physical traits. These two species likely diverged from their closest relatives 1.2 million years ago. Later studies place the plateau pika in a sister clade to all other pikas, and point to a closer relationship between the Nubra pika and the Sikkim pika (O. sikimaria), a species once considered to be a subspecies of the Moupin pika that was separated in 2016.

There are two known subspecies of the Nubra pika:

- O. n. nubrica, nominate subspecies, occupies the region from the Mustang District of Nepal to Ladakh through the Tibet Autonomous Region, synonymous with O. lama and O. aliensis
- O. n. lhasaensis, native to the southeastern Tibet Autonomous Region and previously a subspecies of the Moupin pika, O. t. lhasaensis

== Description ==
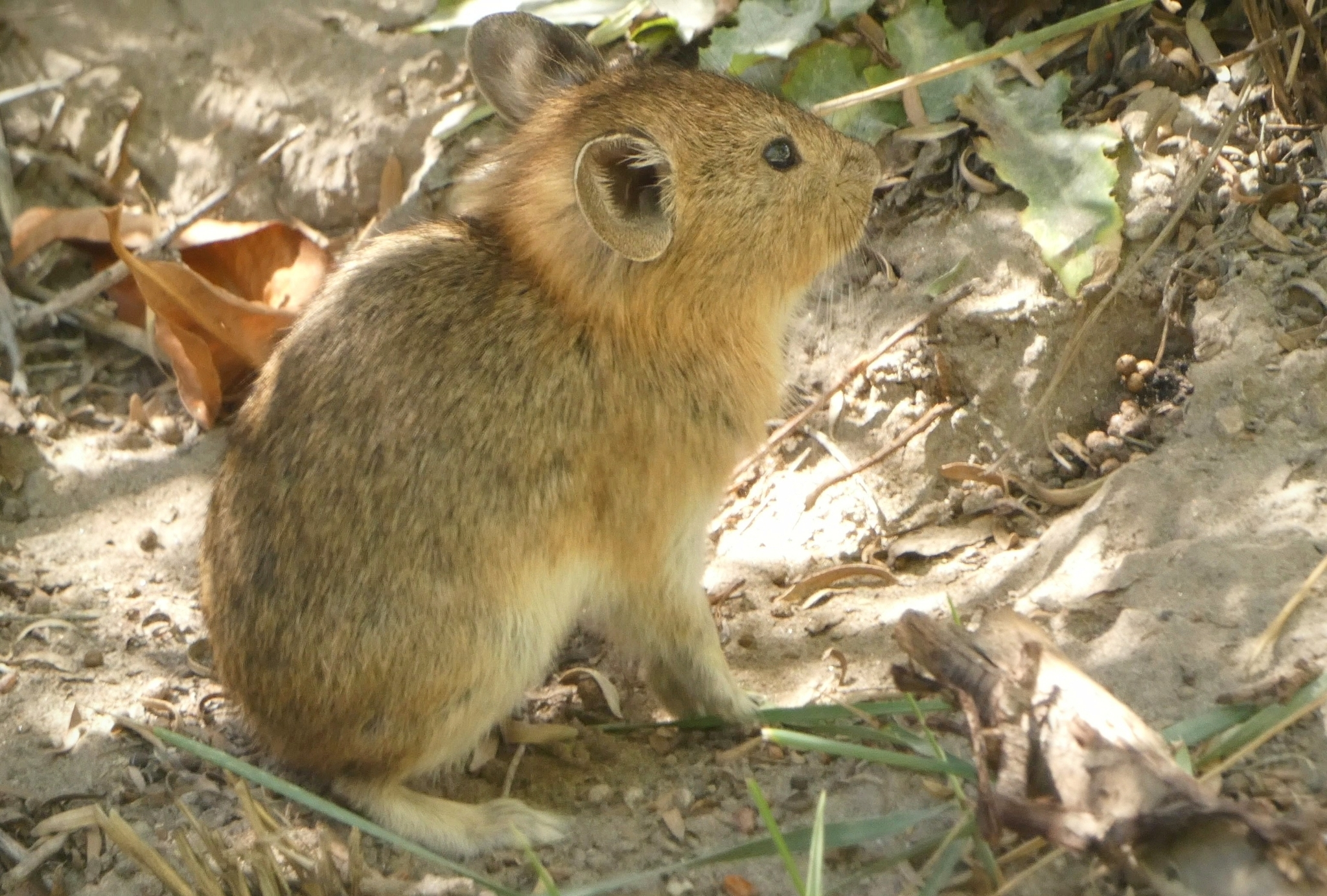
A Nubra pika in profile

In summer, the Nubra pika is a pale grey to brownish red furred pika, having interspersed black hairs across its coat; in winter, the species' fur is longer and a more uniform gray in color. At its greatest head and body length, it measures from 140 to 184 millimetres (5.5 to 7.2 in). Adults have been weighed from 96 to 135 grams (3.4 to 4.8 oz). The ears have white edges and are largely black, with a notably pale patch on the back, and are 20 to 27 millimetres (0.79 to 1.06 in) in diameter. It has a flat and narrow skull in comparison to other pikas. Its skull is larger on average compared to the Moupin pika, as is the whole body, but its skull is smaller than that of Royle's pika. The tail is very short, being at most 5 millimetres (0.20 in). Like other pikas, it has a total of 26 teeth, and a dental formula of 2.0.3.21.0.2.3: two upper and one lower incisors, no canines, three upper and two lower premolars, and two upper and three lower molars.

== Distribution and habitat ==
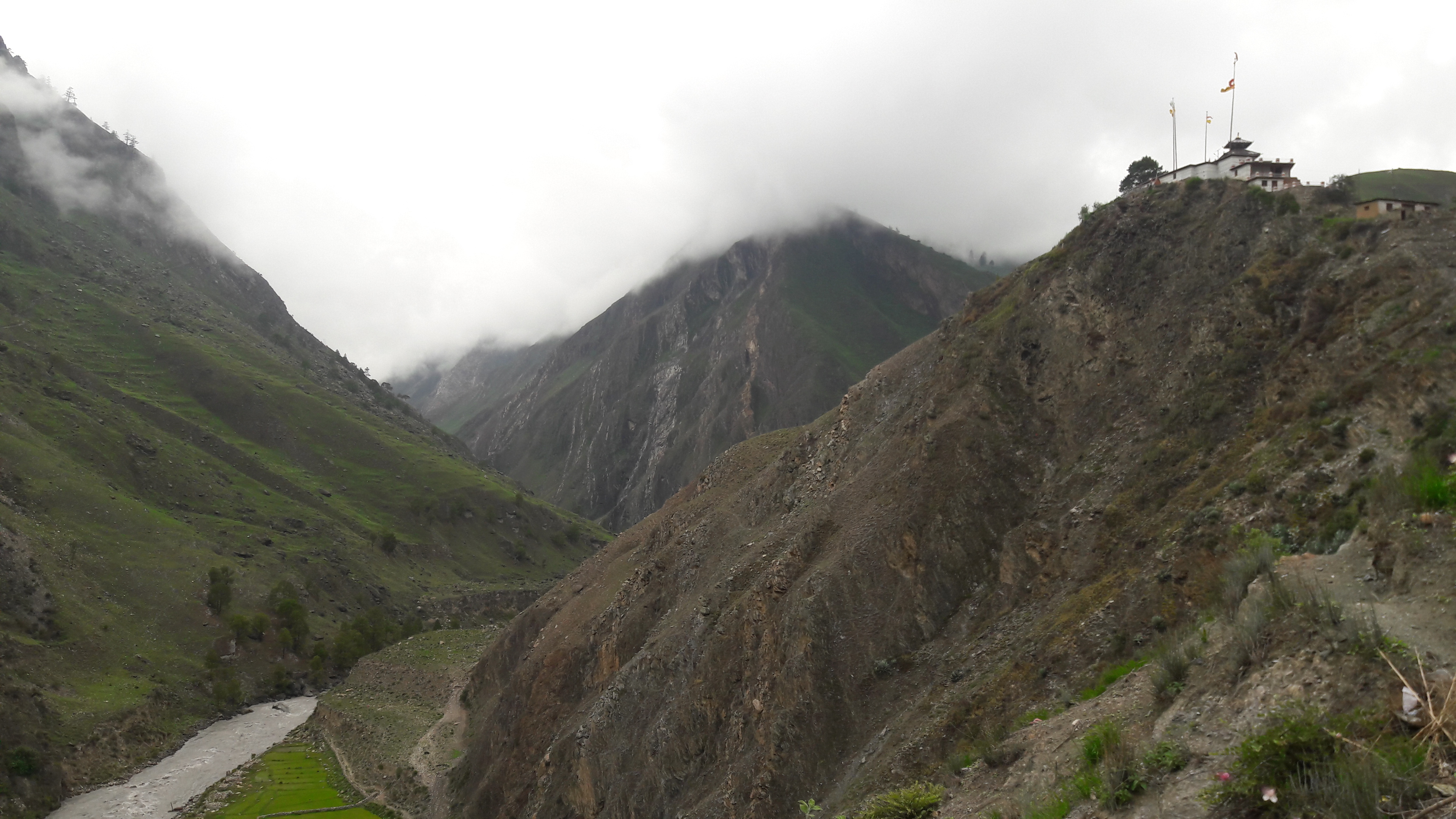
A mountain valley in Dolpa, Nepal, a region where the Nubra pika can be found

Nubra pikas are widely distributed across the Himalayas, from Ladakh in India through the Tibet Autonomous Region in China and Himali Region of Nepal. It occurs in the same regions as the Sikkim pika and the Moupin pika subspecies O. t. nangquenica, as well as the large-eared pika (O. macrotis), a non-burrowing species that prefers rocky habitats. The Nubra pika is found at elevations between 3,000 and 4,500 metres (9,800 and 14,800 ft), where it is reportedly common.

The Nubra pika inhabits shrubland habitats. As a burrowing species, it avoids rocky talus regions and instead resides in areas with dense vegetation. It may rarely inhabit cliffside regions. Common plants in Nubra pika habitats include common sea buckthorn, saltcedar, willow trees, honeysuckle, and peashrubs. Its habitat and vegetation preferences are shared with Thomas's pika (O. thomasi), but notably differ from the closely related plateau pika, which resides in less herbaceous regions.

== Ecology and behavior ==
The nubra pika constructs simple burrows in areas where vegetation is particularly thick and thorny. It is a generalist herbivore, feeding upon the honeysuckle, willow, and Caragana plants common in its range. In efforts to stockpile food, the Nubra pika constructs small piles of hay in concealed locations. These haypiles are mainly made up of Artemisia stems and roots.

Though it is not reported to form colonies, it is social, living in defined family units, a behavior found in other burrowing pika species. Little is known regarding the species' reproduction, but juveniles have been found in June, July and August, and individuals in the sub-adult stage have been seen from August to early October. The species is diurnal, and is often seen only in moments when it dashes between places of cover under vegetation. Its presence is marked by its burrows, trails gnawed through vegetation, and latrines (piles of dry pellets). It is affected by the flea Geusibia triangularis, a member of the genus Geusibia that specifically parasitizes pikas.

== Conservation status ==
There are few threats to the Nubra pika. The species has a wide distribution, and is present in several protected areas. It is listed as a least- concern species by both the International Union for Conservation of Nature (IUCN) and the authors of the Red List of China's Vertebrates. Its population trends and natural history are largely unknown, but due to the remoteness of its habitat, it is unlikely to be threatened by human activities. This remoteness also makes it difficult to study, which affects the accuracy and frequency of status assessments.
