= Marcus Ward Lyon Jr. =

U.S. mammalogist, bacteriologist, and pathologist (1875–1942)

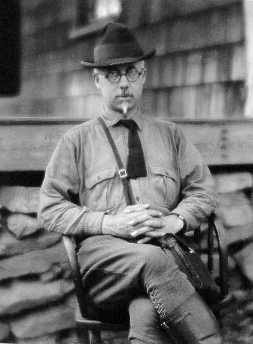
- Marcus Ward Lyon Jr. in 1917 at Washington Biologists' Field Club on Plummers Island
- Born: February 5, 1875; Rock Island Arsenal, Illinois, United States
- Died: May 19, 1942 (aged 67); South Bend, Indiana, United States
- Resting place: Arlington National Cemetery; 38°52′49.5″N 77°04′15.5″W
- Education: Brown University; George Washington University
- Spouse: Martha Marie Brewer (m. 1902 – 1942)
- Scientific career
- Fields: Mammalogy; Bacteriology; Pathology
- Workplaces: North Carolina Medical College; National Museum of Natural History; Howard University Medical School; Walter Reed Army Hospital; George Washington University Medical School South Bend Clinic
- Thesis: Treeshrews: An account of the mammalian family Tupaiidae
- Author abbrev. (zoology): Lyon

Marcus Ward Lyon Jr. (February 5, 1875 – May 19, 1942) was an American mammalogist, bacteriologist, and pathologist. He was born into a military family, and demonstrated an early interest in zoology by collecting local wildlife around his father's army posts. He graduated from Brown University in 1897, and continued his studies at George Washington University while working part-time at the United States National Museum (USNM). (Note: The United States National Museum is now the National Museum of Natural History of the Smithsonian Institution.) At the same time, he taught at Howard University Medical School and later George Washington University Medical School. He received his Ph.D. from George Washington University in 1913.

In 1919, he and his wife, Martha, moved to South Bend, Indiana, to join a newly opened clinic. Prior to moving, Lyon had published many papers on mammalogy, both during and after his tenure at the USNM. In these papers, he had formally described six species, three genera, and one family. Once in South Bend, he began to publish medical studies, too, but continued his work in mammalogy, with a particular focus on the local fauna of Indiana. He published more than 160 papers during his career.

Lyon acquired the rank of major in the Medical Reserve Corps during World War I, and was appointed president of the American Society of Mammalogists from 1931 to 1932. He was a member of Sigma Xi, the Society of American Bacteriologists, the Indiana Academy of Science, and the Biological Society of Washington. Lyon became a conservationist later in life.

== Early life and education ==
Lyon was born on February 5, 1875, in Rock Island Arsenal, Illinois. His family included his father, Captain Marcus Ward Lyon Sr.; his mother, Lydia Anna Lyon; and his two brothers, Henry S. Lyon and James W. Lyon. Because of his father's military career, Lyon's family moved across the United States throughout his childhood and adolescence. The first hint of the young Lyon's future scientific interests came while they were stationed at Watertown Arsenal, near Boston, Massachusetts, where he began collecting insects and animals from the local area. No other details of his early life were documented until 1893, when he graduated from Rock Island High School—his father had evidently been re-stationed at Rock Island Arsenal at about this time. He attended Brown University and completed his Ph.B. in 1897, which included training in biology. In 1898, he began his graduate studies at George Washington University, obtaining his M.S. in 1900, his M.D. in 1902, and his Ph.D. in 1913.

== Career ==
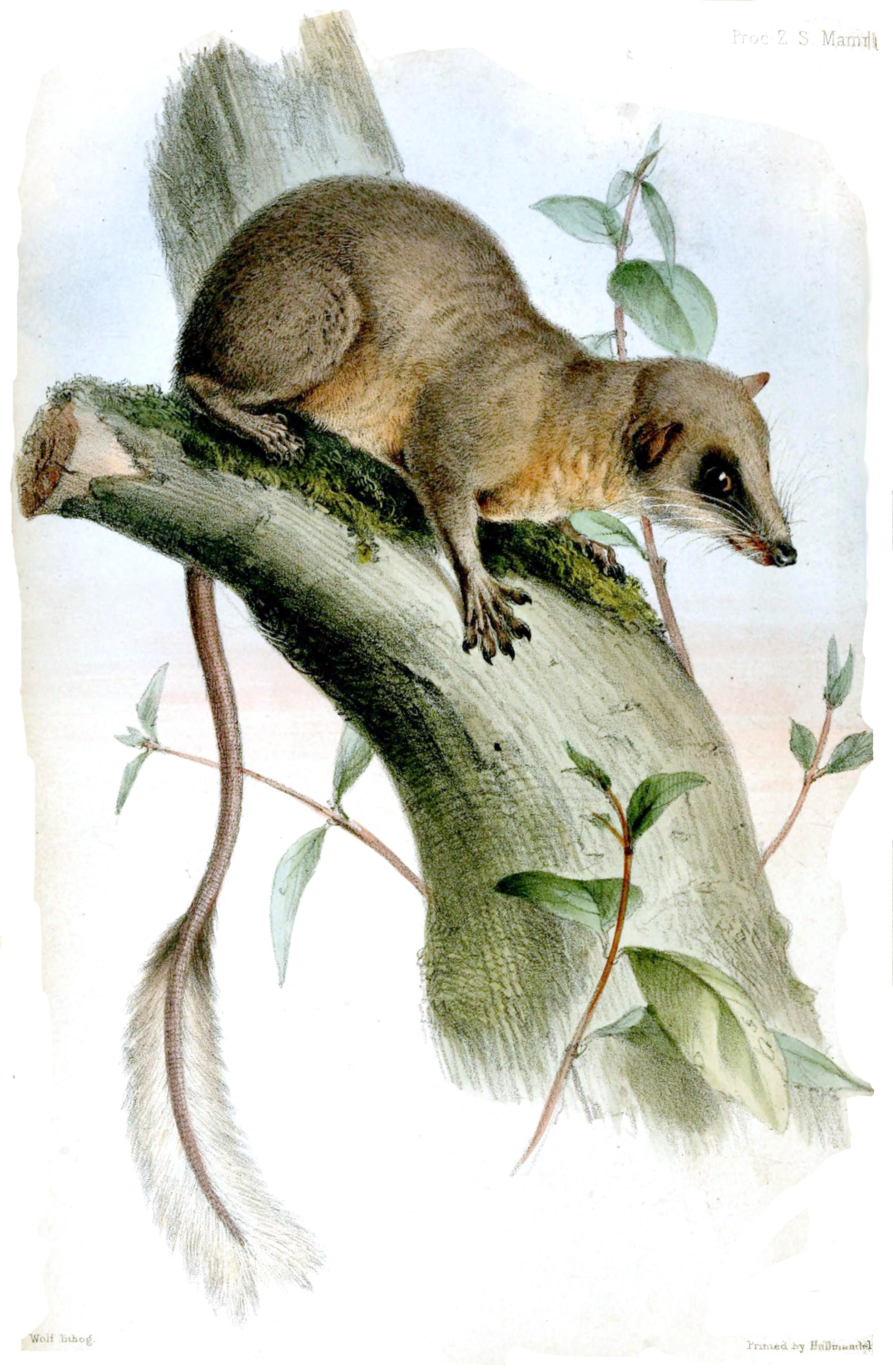
Lyon is the taxonomic authority for the family Ptilocercidae (pen-tailed treeshrews) and other mammalian taxa.

Upon completion of his first degree, Lyon spent a year (1897–1898) at North Carolina Medical College, where he taught bacteriology. In conjunction with his graduate studies, he moved to Washington, D.C., in 1898 to become a part-time Aid in the Division of Mammals at the United States National Museum (USNM). Lyon was later promoted to Assistant Curator for Mammals. (Note: Sources disagree on the duration of his tenure as the Assistant Curator for Mammals. According to the Guide to the Smithsonian Archives, he was an Aid from 1898 until 1906 and Assistant Curator from 1906 to 1909, and this is supported by the museum's annual report for the year ending June 30, 1899, which reports his appointment to the position of Aid on August 15, 1898, and the museum's annual report for the year ending June 30, 1906, which recorded his promotion to Assistant Curator during the preceding twelve months. According to Robert P. McIntosh, Lyon was the Assistant Curator from 1898 until 1900, and the Historical Catalogue of Brown University reports that he held that position from 1905 through 1912; neither gives dates for his post as an Aid.) The USNM sent him to Venezuela with Lieutenant Wirt Robinson of the United States Army in 1899 to collect mammal specimens, and later appointed him as its Chief Special Agent for the 1904 Louisiana Purchase Exposition in St. Louis and the 1905 Lewis and Clark Centennial Exposition in Portland, Oregon. He retained his post at the USNM until 1912. Lyon taught physiology (1903–04 and 1907–09) and bacteriology (1909–15) at Howard University Medical School.

In the latter half of 1915, Lyon began teaching at George Washington University Medical School, handling courses in bacteriology and pathology until 1917, and veterinary zoology and parasitology from 1917 until 1918. In 1917, he joined the U.S. Army, serving as a pathologist at the Walter Reed Army Hospital during World War I. In September 1919, he transferred to the Medical Reserve Corps as a major. By the end of that year, Lyon's 18 years of medical teaching and practice resulted in a job offer in pathology at the South Bend Clinic in South Bend, Indiana. His wife, Martha, was also extended a job offer at the same clinic, and joined as an ophthalmologist. Lyon maintained his offices at the clinic until his death in 1942.

Because of his work as a mammalogist, Lyon is considered the taxonomic authority for the family Ptilocercidae (pen-tailed treeshrews), as well as the genus Anathana (the Madras treeshrew) and two genera of leporids (rabbits and hares), Pentalagus (the Amami rabbit) and Pronolagus (red rock hares). Lyon was the first to describe the Bornean white-bearded gibbon (Hylobates albibarbis), the Gansu pika (Ochotona cansus), the Sumatran porcupine (Hystrix sumatrae), the shadowy broad-nosed bat (Platyrrhinus umbratus), and two species of slow loris from Borneo, Nycticebus bancanus and Nycticebus borneanus.

His private zoological collections were incorporated into the collections at the USNM. Lyon created two herbariums, the first containing plant specimens from Oregon and the second from the Indiana Dunes and lower Michigan. The former was included in the United States National Herbarium, now the United States Botanic Garden, and the latter at the University of Michigan Herbarium.

== Publications ==
During his career, Lyon published more than 160 papers, roughly 80 of which were in the field of zoology and 55 more in pathology. Other publications included four articles in botany, numerous book reviews, technical reports, and newspaper articles. Until the move to Indiana, Lyon wrote many papers in mammalogy, focusing primarily on morphology, systematics, and zoogeography. In addition to his Ph.D. thesis, entitled "Treeshrews: An account of the mammalian family Tupaiidae", he authored papers about other mammals of the Far East, with which he had become very familiar through his study of the collections that were sent to the USNM. Following the end of his relationship with the USNM in 1912, Lyon continued to write mammalogy material and began publishing basic medical studies.

After moving to Indiana, the focus of his publications shifted primarily to medical issues and mammalogy within his new home state. Despite his interest in and occupation with medical science, his passion was for the study of living and extinct mammals. He became a regular contributor to the American Midland Naturalist, publishing a list of plant species native to the Indiana Dunes and notes on ground squirrels and badgers prior to his work "Mammals of Indiana", which spanned all 365 pages of the first issue in 1936. In 1935, he had been invited to join the editorial staff, becoming an associate editor for mammalogy. Near the end of his life, Lyon began to write about wildlife conservation.

A private collection of Lyon's papers, along with those of his wife, is held at the University of Notre Dame Archives. It comprises correspondence, papers, notes, manuscripts, letters, articles, and speeches, as well as articles collected by Lyon and a scrapbook of his wife's college life and more.

=== Selected publications ===
- Lyon, M. W. Jr. (1904). Classification of the hares and their allies. Smithsonian institution publication, no. 1456. pp. 321–447. OCLC 6180284.
- Lyon, M. W. Jr. (1906). "Mammals of Banka, Mendanau, and Billiton Islands, between Sumatra and Borneo". Proceedings of the United States National Museum. 31 (1498): 575–612. doi:10.5479/si.00963801.31-1498.575. hdl:10088/13904. OCLC 25674168.
- Lyon, M. W. Jr. (1906). "Notes on the slow lemurs". Proceedings of the United States National Museum. 31 (1494): 527–538. doi:10.5479/si.00963801.31-1494.527.
- Lyon, M. W. Jr. (1907). "Mammals Collected in Western Borneo by Dr. W. L. Abbott". Proceedings of the United States National Museum. 33 (1577): 547–571. doi:10.5479/si.00963801.33-1577.547. hdl:10088/14004. OCLC 25775782.
- Lyon, M. W. Jr.; Osgood, W.H. (1909). "Catalogue of the type-specimens of mammals in the United States National Museum, including the biological survey collection". Bulletin of the United States National Museum (62): i–x, 1–325. doi:10.5479/si.03629236.62.i. hdl:10088/10140. OCLC 4974907.
- Lyon, M. W. Jr. (1913). "Treeshrews: An account of the mammalian family Tupaiidae". Proceedings of the United States National Museum. 45 (1976): 1–188. doi:10.5479/si.00963801.45-1976.1. hdl:10088/14451. OCLC 4416817.
- Lyon, M. W. Jr. (1936). "Mammals of Indiana". American Midland Naturalist. 17 (1): 1–384. doi:10.2307/2420156. JSTOR 2420156. OCLC 2666579.
- Lyon, M. W. Jr. (1939). Conservation from the naturalist's point of view. Year Book. Indiana Audubon Society.

== Honors ==
Lyon held honorary memberships in Phi Beta Kappa and Sigma Xi. A member of the organization committee that founded the District of Columbia Chapter of Sigma Xi in 1914, Lyon became the Secretary of both the Organization Committee and Chapter, which held its first annual meeting in 1915. He was appointed secretary of the Biological Society of Washington in 1904 and from 1915 through 1919. In 1917, he was elected for membership to the Washington Biologists' Field Club. Lyon was president of the St. Joseph County Medical Society in 1931, as well as the treasurer (1927–1932) and president (1933) of the Indiana Academy of Science. He was also a member of the Society of American Bacteriologists. Lyon was the 7th president of the American Society of Mammalogists from 1931 to 1932, and received honorary membership a month before he died.

== Personal life ==
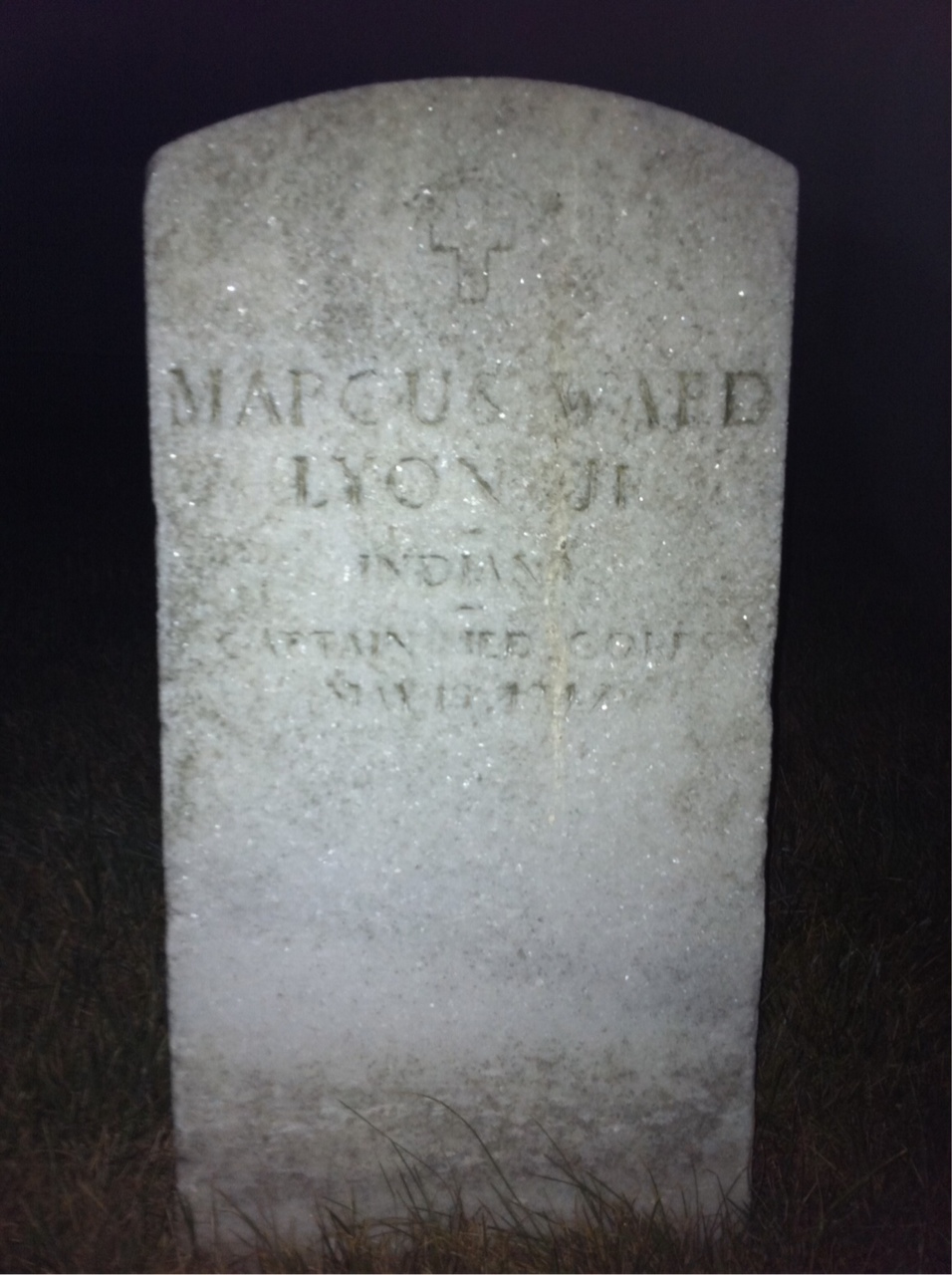
Lyon was buried at Arlington National Cemetery.

Lyon married Martha Marie Brewer (b. 1871) of Lanham, Maryland, in 1902, and together they had one daughter, Charlotte Lyon. Lyon and his wife attended scientific meetings together; in 1911, they traveled to Europe to see museums and to visit famous zoologists. Martha Brewer Lyon obtained her M.S. at Columbian College in 1901 and M.D. from Brown University in 1907. She later worked as an ophthalmologist at the South Bend Clinic with her husband until she opened her own office in 1931. She maintained her office until her death on January 18, 1942. Lyon died on May 19, 1942, at his home in South Bend and was buried on May 27 at Arlington National Cemetery.

While living in South Bend, Lyon became close friends with Reverend Julius A. Nieuwland, CSC, a botanist and chemist at the University of Notre Dame. They went on field trips and collected plant specimens that were incorporated into Lyon's second herbarium, which he made in his spare time with the help of his wife, Nieuwland, and Austrian botanist Theodor Just. Lyon was known for his love of nature, and in an obituary written by Just, he was noted as being an "ardent conservationist" later in his life. Lyon criticized poorly managed conservation programs in his paper "Conservation from the Naturalist's Point of View" (1939), and in his final paper, "The Kankakee Area—Its Past and Present", he envisioned life around the Kankakee Outwash Plain before human activities had changed it. Lyon also gave up his cottage in the Indiana Dunes after the wildlife refuge was converted into a vacation destination.
