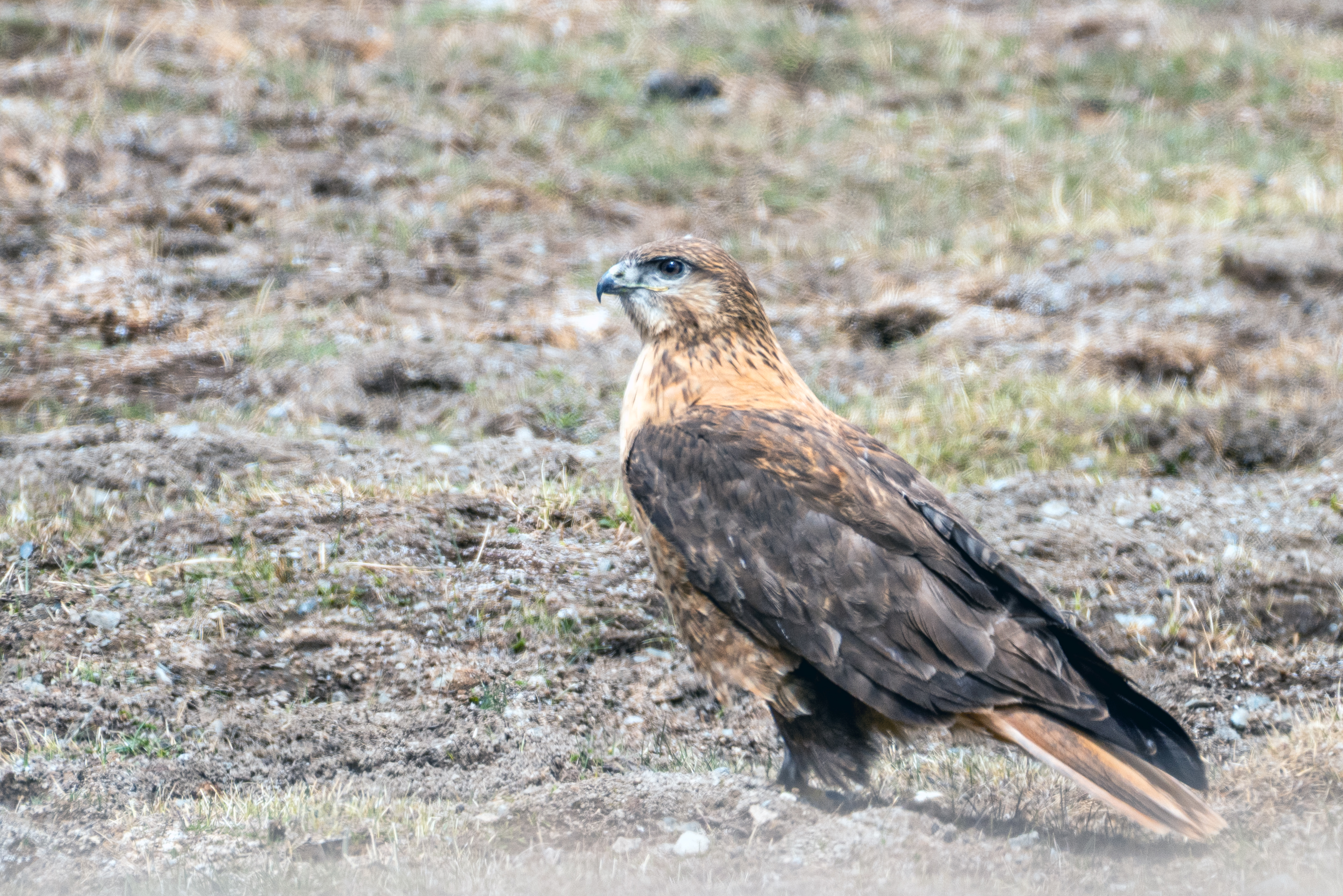
- An upland buzzard in Pangong Tso

Conservation status
- Least Concern (IUCN 3.1)

Scientific classification
- Kingdom: Animalia
- Phylum: Chordata
- Class: Aves
- Order: Accipitriformes
- Family: Accipitridae
- Genus: Buteo
- Species: B. hemilasius

Binomial name
- Buteo hemilasius Temminck & Schlegel, 1845

= Upland buzzard =

Species of bird

The upland buzzard (Buteo hemilasius) is a species of bird of prey in the family Accipitridae. The largest species of the Buteo genus, this buzzard lives in mountainous grassy and rocky areas in areas of Central Asia, northern South Asia and East Asia from Kazakhstan to Korea. The upland buzzard is migratory but typically covers a short distance apparently to avoid snow cover that may hamper prey capture. This species primarily subsists on small mammals but does not shun alternate prey from small to large birds and insects. This little-known raptor has a large range, and though generally uncommon, it is not thought to be rare or declining as a species. As a result, it is classified as least concern by the IUCN.

== Taxonomy and systematics ==
The upland buzzard species was first described by Temminck and Schlegel in 1844 and is monotypic. Currently, this species is considered to form a superspecies with the long-legged buzzard. At one time, the upland buzzard was considered as conspecific with the long-legged species. A small molecular study found that there was not a strong genetic affinity between the upland and long-legged buzzards. There is some circumstantial claims that they will interbreed. However, there is no strong evidence of regular interbreeding, to such a degree the specific definition of the buzzards blurs, despite their ranges broadly overlapping.

== Description ==
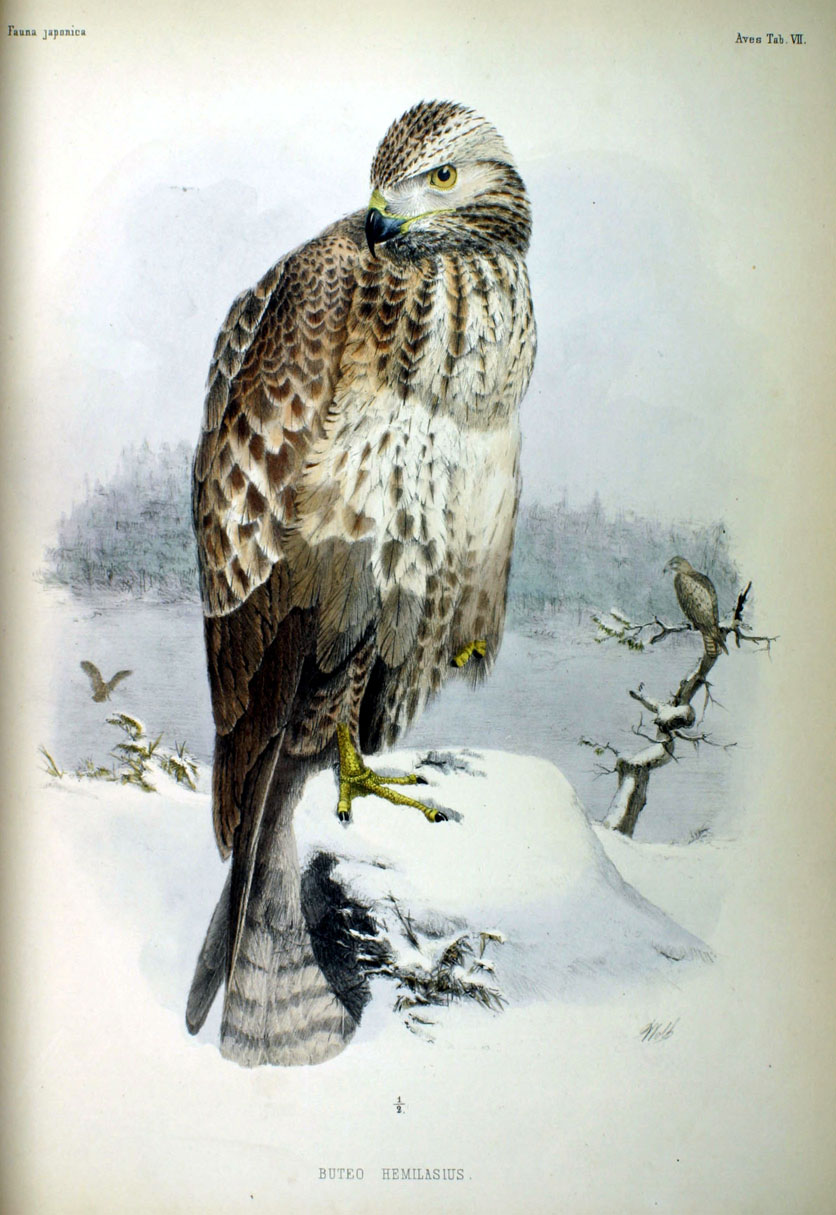
A portrait of the upland buzzard.

This is the largest buzzard and the largest member of the genus Buteo in the world based on total length and wingspan. However, it is roughly equaled in bulk by the North American ferruginous hawk (Buteo regalis), which is also only marginally smaller going on mean standard measurements. The total length of the upland buzzard is 57 to 72 cm (22 to 28 in) and wingspan is 143 to 161 cm (4 ft 8 in to 5 ft 3 in). Body mass is known to range from 950 to 1,400 g (2.09 to 3.09 lb) in males, with three averaging 1,168 g (2.575 lb), and from 970 to 2,050 g (2.14 to 4.52 lb) in females, with seven averaging 1,581 g (3.486 lb). The average size of 14 upland buzzards in the Tibetan Plateau was 639 mm (25.2 in) in length, including a tail of 289 mm (11.4 in), a smallish culmen of 30 mm (1.2 in), a tarsus length of 86 mm (3.4 in) and a body mass of 1,557 g (3.433 lb). The Upland buzzard is conspicuously large for a Buteo, with long wings and a relatively long tail, and fairly eagle-like compared to related species. There are both pale and dark morphs. The pale morph is generally beige and earthen dark brown in colour. This morph bears a lightly marked whitish colour with a variable ochre wash to the head and nape with the chest generally appearing purest whitish. On pale morphs, the whitish chest is contrasted with dark brown areas widely but irregularly distributed across the lower breast and abdomen. The flanks and belly are similarly dark, while the tail is greyish with dark sides and prominently dark bands, with a heavier sub-terminal band. The coverts on perched buzzards can appear lighter brown than elsewhere. In flight on pale morphs, the major coverts are variable, appearing somewhat streaky brown, contrasted with a very strong blackish patagium mark. The flight feathers appear whitish with a variable amount of dark barring leading into the blackish wingtips and trailing edges. Dark morph upland buzzards are almost entirely solid black-brown throughout the body. with the flight feather pattern similar to pale morph but darker apart from the flight feathers. The "trousers" are heavily feathered brown, often covering at least three-quarters of the legs. Despite individual variations, these buzzards are more insulated on their legs than other Buteo, apart from the ferruginous hawk and rough-legged buzzards (B. lagopus) which both have feathering extending along their tarsi.

The call of the upland buzzard is a prolonged nasal mewing, not dissimilar to that of the common buzzard (B. buteo), although it is said to vocalize less than that species.

=== Identification ===
The upland buzzard is fairly similar in plumage to others buzzards, and may need to be distinguished from the overlapping species of long-legged buzzards (B. rufinus), Himalayan buzzards (B. reflectus) and eastern buzzards (B. japonicus). The Himalayan species in particular is often found is similar in distribution and in similar habitats at high elevations. The upland species is known to be difficult to distinguish from the related long-legged buzzard, and the two species are often misidentified for each other. However, it is said it can be told from the long-legged buzzard by being slightly larger and lacking the warmer, sometimes rufous tones (rather than earthen brown) of that species. However, the extent of patterns are roughly corresponding on both the upland and long-legged buzzard as well their proportions and size broadly overlaps between the two. Usually the long-legged buzzard tends to occur at lower elevations. However, distant flying buzzards are sometimes considered to be too similar to be identifiable between these species, especially darker individuals. The other buzzards are conspicuously smaller, with shorter proportions to their much smaller wings and shorter tails. Both Himalayan and eastern buzzards are also differently marked, usually appearing paler bellied apart from a belly band and stipling to the flanks with less strongly contrasting patterns on the wing on the coverts and flight feathers. Dark morphs of the respective buzzard species are more similarly marked but the upland buzzard can be distinguished by its size and proportions, excepting the dark morph long-legged buzzard which is practically indistinguishable.

== Distribution and status ==
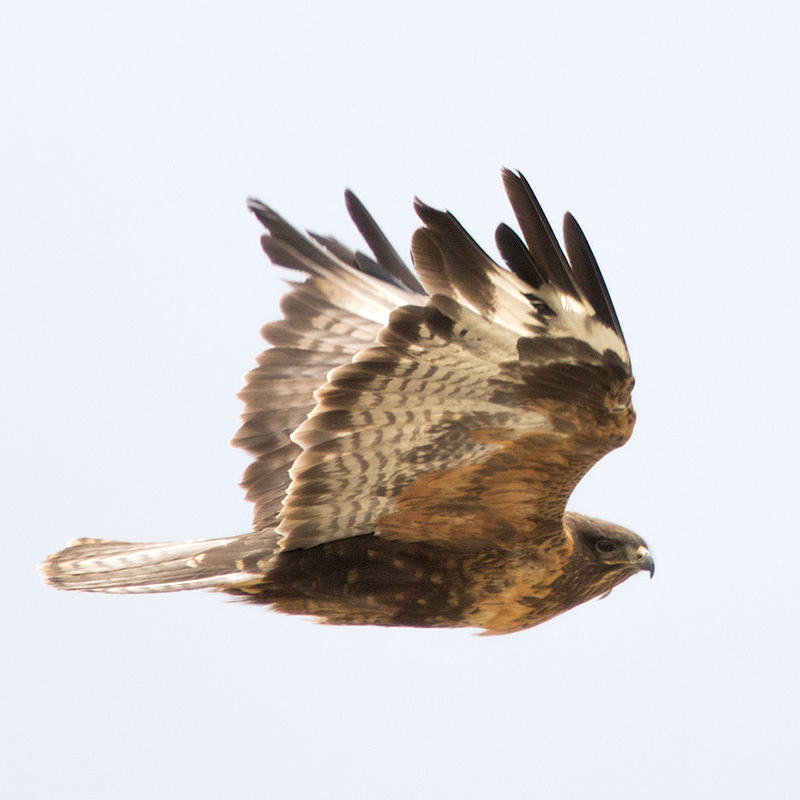
An upland buzzard in flight.

The central portion of the breeding range, comprising a great majority, of the upland buzzard is in Mongolia and China, in the latter nation especially in the western, northern and northeastern areas. To the north of Mongolia, where they occur throughout, upland buzzards also breed in several adjacent areas of southern Siberia. In the west, their breeding range may edge very slightly into far eastern Tajikistan, southeastern Kyrgyzstan and fairly recently in the East Kazakhstan Region, where they were documented to nest for the first time only in 1990. In the south, the upland buzzard may breed in the quite northern reaches of Bhutan, Nepal and now for the first recorded time in 1998 to nest in the Indian subcontinent within Changtang, Tibet. During times of passage, northern birds radiate through non-breeding areas of western China and in eastern Kyrgyzstan as well in North Korea and South Korea far to the east. Wintering areas of upland buzzards can include much of eastern Kazakhstan, northern India, much of Nepal and Bhutan and central and eastern China. Generally speaking, upland buzzards are not long-distance migrants and many travel minimal distances to winter.

In seldom cases, upland buzzards have appeared in Japan as well, most likely vagrating from Korea. An unusual old claim exists of the upland buzzard turning up in Iran during winter. This species tends to be generally uncommon, but in some areas such as Tibet and peak prey areas of Mongolia, it can border on abundant down to rare.

The upland buzzard is not considered a threatened species.

== Behaviour and ecology ==
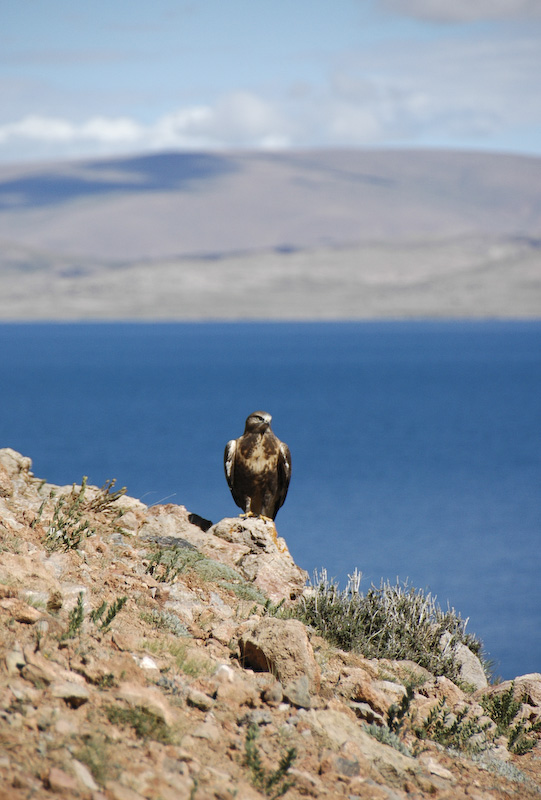
An upland buzzard in Tibet.

The upland buzzard is normally found in open, high elevation regions. While recorded at over 5,000 m (16,000 ft) in elevation, the species normally nests at elevations between 1,000 and 4,500 m (3,300 and 14,800 ft) and may at times be recorded down to sea-level during the winter. In the montane areas it nests in habitats such as alpine meadow, upland steppe and plateaus, often foraging in these assorted grasslands and rocky areas. They also visit cultivation such as arable lands in both summer and winter. The upland buzzard is fairly typical Buteo often given to extensively soaring flights, with their wings held in quite a strong dihedral. The upland buzzard frequently hovers, often during hunting spells. Unlike many Buteos, they do not have perches usually available to them while hunting so must swoop down from active flight, but may sometimes be able to make use of rocks as hunting perches. They will also sometimes capture insects on the ground. The upland buzzard is a partial migrant, often traveling minimal distances in an apparent search of appropriate hunting areas. Migration appears to be undertaken in September to October in autumn and returns in spring in March to May. The species is frequently recorded migrating over the Gobi Desert in late October. Wintering areas from the vagrants in Japan to southern China can be in lowland cultivation.

Upland buzzards often feed extensively on the same prey and in the same habitats as Eurasian eagle-owls (Bubo bubo), however the eagle-owl is considerably larger and more powerful and sometimes additionally hunts the upland buzzards. Additionally, upland buzzards have been known to fall victim to golden eagles (Aquila chrysaetos).

=== Diet ===
The upland buzzard is, by and large, a specialized hunter of small mammals. In the Tibetan Plateau, the main foods of this species were tundra voles (Microtus oeconomus) (at 57.5% of 756 prey items), Plateau pika (Ochotona curzoniae) (19.5%) and Gansu pika (Ochotona cansus) (18.6%). Further study of stable isotopes in this area determined that while small mammals were the primary foods, during downshifts in the populations of these preferred prey, upland buzzards in Tibet switch to subsiding on a variety of passerine birds, largely but not entirely fledglings, such as larks, buntings, finches and jays. Another routine prey species in the Tibetan highlands is the Chinese zokor (Eospalax fontanierii). Mongolian population of upland buzzards is known to be highly dependent on the Brandt's vole (Lasiopodomys brandtii) and can be dictated in numbers by the population cycles of this prey. Other important prey in Mongolia is the Mongolian gerbil (Meriones unguiculatus), the Daurian ground squirrel (Spermophilus dauricus) and the Daurian pika (Ochotona daurica). In southern Altai, Russia, 59 prey items were led by northern red-backed voles (Myodes rutilus), at 27.1%, unidentified voles at 22%, grey red-backed voles (Myodes rufocanus) at 18.6% northern pika (Ochotona hyperborea) at 16.9% and various birds also at 16.9%. Additionally, in Altai, upland buzzards were documented to attack domestic chickens (Gallus gallus domesticus). During winter in Lake Issyk-Kul, Kyrgyzstan, prey was observed to consist of tamarisk jirds (Meriones tamariscinus), house mouse (Mus musculus), grey partridge (Perdix perdix), rock pigeon (Columba livia) and larks. In addition to typical foraging, insects like beetles and grasshoppers are sometimes taken from the ground and bird's eggs are sometimes consumed. While the main prey is largely quite small rodents and similar mammals, on occasion larger prey is taken. Alternate prey can extend to those weighing over 453 g (0.999 lb) such as willow ptarmigan (Lagopus lagopus) and Daurian hedgehog (Mesechinus dauuricus), and occasionally much larger such as woolly hare (Lepus oiostolus), weighing some 2,320 g (5.11 lb), and Tibetan snowcock (Tetraogallus tibetanus), weighing some 1,550 g (3.42 lb). Additionally, this buzzard was recorded as an occasional likely predator of Mongolian gazelles (Procapra gutturosa), born weighing about 2.9 kg (6.4 lb). On rare occasions, they may prey on small carnivorans such as mountain weasels (Mustela altaica) and corsac fox (Vulpes corsac) pups.

=== Reproduction ===
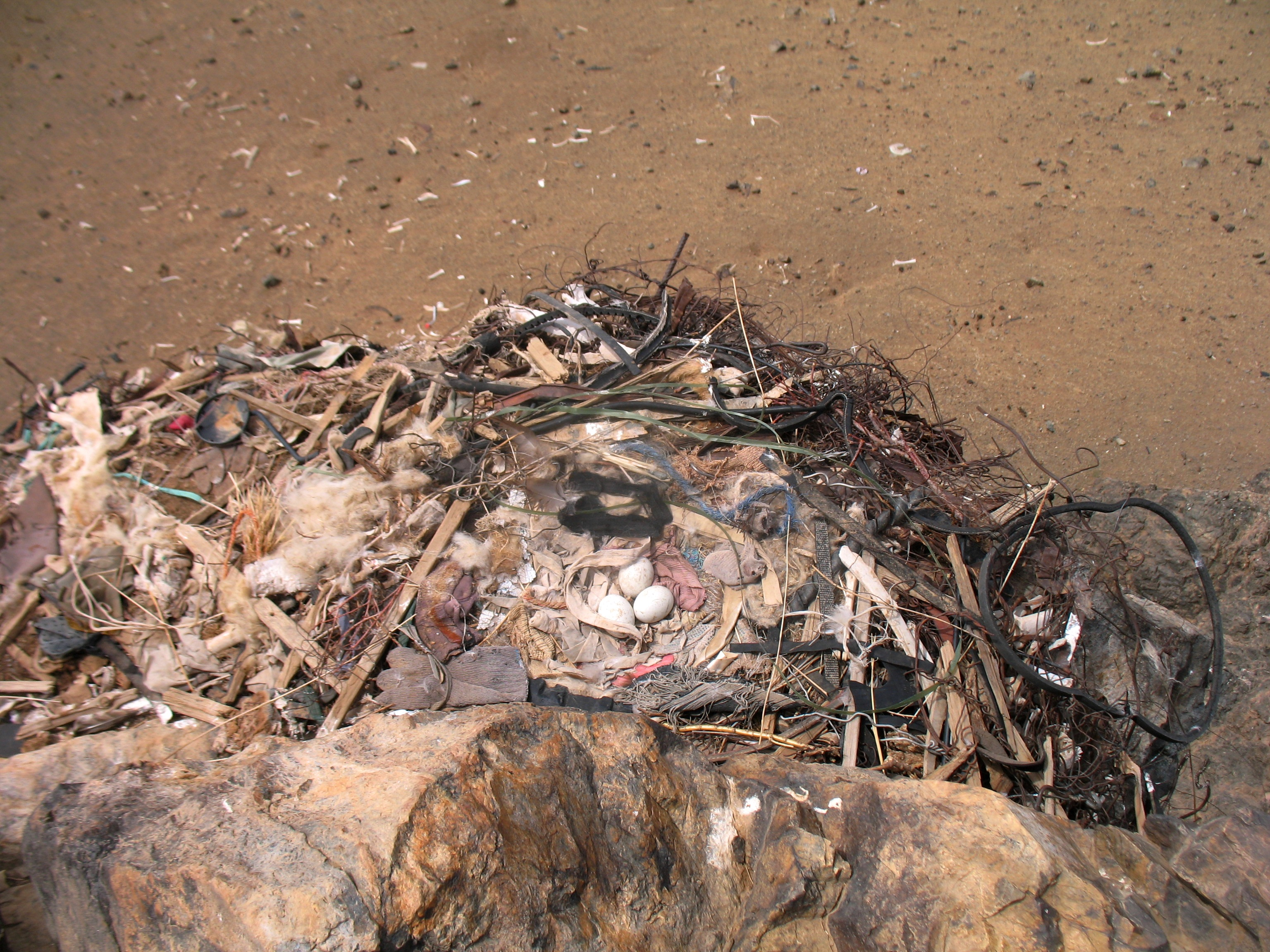
An upland buzzard nest.

The upland buzzard breeds between April and August, with egg laying tending to occur in May. Nests tend to be located on outcrops, crags and ledges of cliffs, usually in locations blocked from the elements by rocks or vegetation. Some nests additionally are placed on steep rocky slopes. The nest is constructed with sticks and well lined, often with wool, grass, dry dung and, perhaps detrimentally, human garbage. This species normally lays a clutch of 2 to 4 eggs and, if an entire clutch is lost, they are capable of laying a replacement clutch. In Mongolia, clutch sizes have been recorded exceptionally varying up to 8, with an average clutch size reported as 3.49. Incubation lasts 36 to 38 days, although previously reported at only about 30 days. The chicks bear greyish-brown down and develop fairly slowly, fledgling at around 45 days. In western and central Mongolia, brood size averaged 1.95. Commonly, two young often fledge from upland buzzard, though up to four fledglings have been recorded. Breeding success is known to be food based and higher sibling competition and perhaps siblicide have been reported in instances where stable prey such as voles decline in population.
