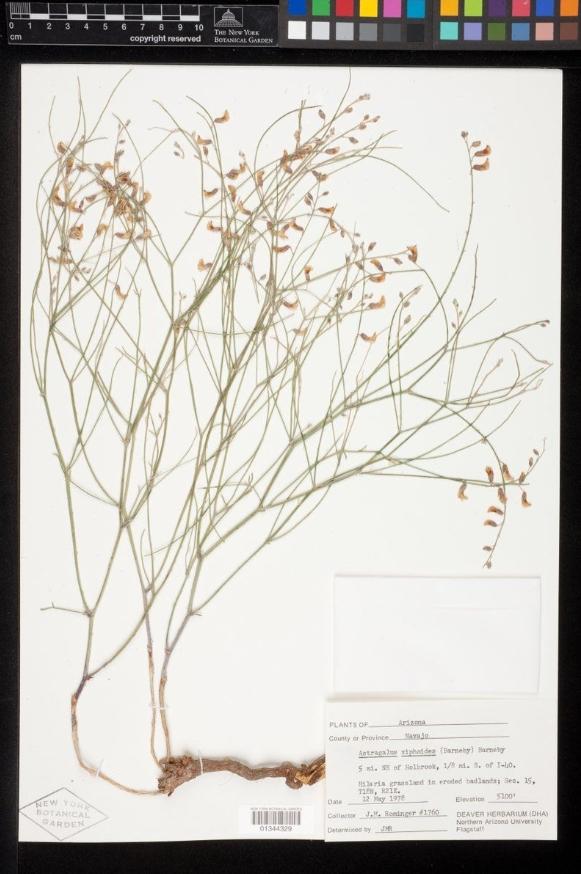

Conservation status
- Vulnerable (NatureServe)

Scientific classification
- Kingdom: Plantae
- Clade: Embryophytes
- Clade: Tracheophytes
- Clade: Spermatophytes
- Clade: Angiosperms
- Clade: Eudicots
- Clade: Rosids
- Order: Fabales
- Family: Fabaceae
- Subfamily: Faboideae
- Genus: Astragalus
- Species: A. xiphoides

Binomial name
- Astragalus xiphoides Barneby.

Synonyms
- Astragalus convallarius var. xiphoides Barneby.

= Astragalus xiphoides =

Species of flowering plant

Astragalus xiphoides, commonly known as gladiator milkvetch, is a species of flowering plant in the family Fabaceae. Named in 1956, it is known only from Arizona.

== Distribution ==
Astragalus xiphoides is rare, occurring across a range of 100–250 square kilometres (39–97 sq mi). The species is native to Arizona, United States, and found mainly on Navajo land. It is found on clay and sandstone cliffs, at an elevation of 1,500–1,830 metres (4,920–6,000 ft). and is known only from the Little Colorado River area of Holbrook, Arizona.

== History ==
The species was first described by Rupert Charles Barneby, in a 1956 publication of The American Midland Naturalist.

== Description ==
Astragalus xiphoides is a perennial herb.

The plant is thin, and has few leaves. It has fine, ash colored hairs, that are around 0.4 millimetres (0.016 in) long. The plant has few stems, which are long, and branched at the first few nodes. The flowers are present from below or near to the middle of the plant. The leaves have 2–7 millimetres (0.079–0.276 in) long appendages. The leaves measure from 2.5–13 centimetres (0.98–5.12 in). The lowest leaves are large, egg shaped, and papery in texture. Leaves higher up on the plant are smaller, tapering and triangular in shape. The plant also has 3–17 millimetres (0.12–0.67 in) leaflets.

The flower stalks are 3.5–7.5 centimetres (1.4–3.0 in) long, and the stalks at the bottom of the plant are thicker than those at the top. The calyx is 4.6–6 millimetres (0.18–0.24 in) long, white, and has stiff hairs. The petals are yellowish-white in color. The fruits are narrow and oblong in shape, and around 2.5–4 centimetres (0.98–1.57 in) long. They are wedge shaped at both ends, and may be attached without stalks. The seeds are smooth, brown, and measure 2.5–3 millimetres (0.098–0.118 in) long.

Astragalus xiphoides is superficially similar to Astragalus convallarius.
