= Muping Town =

- Town

Chinese transcription(s)
  - Simplified: 穆坪镇
  - Traditional: 穆坪鎮
  - Pinyin: Mùpíng Zhèn
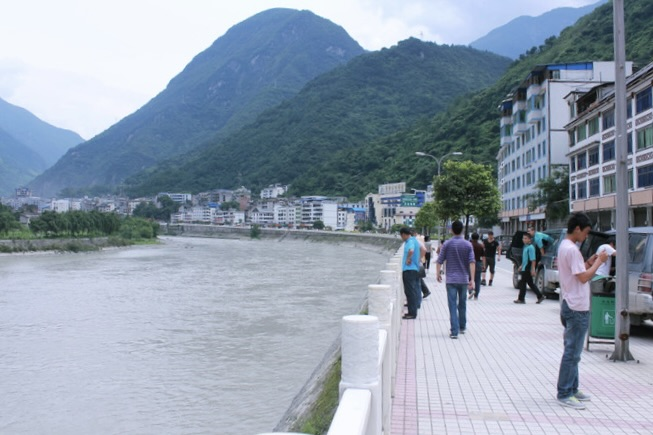

- Location in Sichuan
- Coordinates: 30°22′9″N 102°48′50″E
- Country: China
- Province: Sichuan
- Prefecture: Ya'an
- County: Baoxing

Area
  - Total: 211 km^{2} (81 sq mi)
- Elevation: 1,010 m (3,310 ft)

Population
  - Total: 11,789
  - Density: 55.9/km^{2} (145/sq mi)
- Time zone: UTC+8 (China Standard)
- Postal code: 625700
- Area code: 0835

Muping Town is a town and the county seat of Baoxing County in Sichuan province of southwest China. In the late 1800s, under its alternative rendering Moupin, it developed a reputation for biodiversity among western naturalists, so a number of species carry the name Moupin or the specific epithets moupinensis and moupinense, these include the Moupin pig, Moupin pika, Moupin broad-muzzled bat, Pterolophia moupinensis, Salix moupinensis, and Fragaria moupinensis.

== See also ==
- List of township-level divisions of Sichuan
