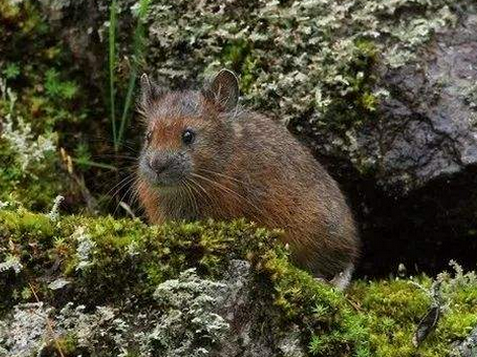

Conservation status
- Least Concern (IUCN 3.1)

Scientific classification
- Kingdom: Animalia
- Phylum: Chordata
- Class: Mammalia
- Infraclass: Placentalia
- Order: Lagomorpha
- Family: Ochotonidae
- Genus: Ochotona
- Species: O. forresti

Binomial name
- Ochotona forresti Thomas, 1923
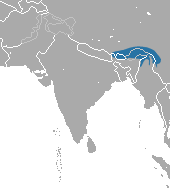
- Forrest's pika range

= Forrest's pika =

Species of mammal

Forrest's pika (Ochotona forresti) is a species of mammal in the pika family, Ochotonidae. It is found in Bhutan, China, India, and Myanmar. The summer dorsal pelage and ventral pelage are dark rufous or blackish brown, and the winter dorsal pelage is a grayish brown, slightly lighter in tone than the ventral pelage. It is a generalist herbivore. It was assessed by the IUCN Red List of Endangered Species as insufficiently known in 1994, as near threatened in 1996, and re-assessed in 2008 as a species of least concern.

== Taxonomy ==
Forrest's pika belongs to the pika family, Ochotonidae, which consists of small mammals that have short ears, forelimbs very slightly longer than hindlimbs, and no external tail. It was first described by the British zoologist Michael Rogers Oldfield Thomas in 1923, who gave it the scientific name Ochotona forresti. The taxonomy of the species is unclear. It was earlier assigned as a subspecies of the Moupin pika (Ochotona thibetana) by Feag and Kao in 1974, Weston in 1982, and Honacki, Kinman, and Koeppl in 1982. It was also assigned to the Royle's pika (Ochotona roylei) by Corbet in 1978, and the steppe pika (Ochotona pusilla) by Ellerman and Morrison-Scott in 1951. It is sympatric with Ochotona macrotis chinensis, Ochotona gloveri calloceps, Royle's pika and possibly the Moupin pika, and allopatric with the Royle's pika. However, according to morphometric and genetic studies, Forrest's pika is a separate species that is confined to the Gaoligong Mountains.

The Gaoligong pika (Ochotona gaoligongensis) and the black pika (Ochotona nigritia) have been treated as separate species, but are now considered to be conspecific, representing colour morphs of Forrest's pika.

O. f. duoxianglaensis is evidently synonymous with the Moupin pika. It may also be closely related to the Chinese red pika (Ochotona erythrotis).

== Description ==
Forrest's pika is similar to a small hare, measuring 15.5 to 18.5 cm (6.1 to 7.3 in) in length, and weighing 110 to 148 g (3.9 to 5.2 oz). The greatest length of the skull is 3.7 to 4.1 cm (1.5 to 1.6 in), and the skull is more curved than the Moupin pika. It also has a broad interorbital region (the region of the skull located between the eyes, anterior to the braincase), and rectangular, broad nasals. It does not have a tail. The summer dorsal pelage and ventral pelage are dark rufous or blackish brown. The ears are rounded, measure 1.8 to 2.3 cm (0.71 to 0.91 in) in length, and feature dark gray spots in the back. In a few individuals, the spots form a dorsal collar on the nape and extend onto the face, but the forehead remains brown. The dorsal side of the ears are light chestnut in color, and have a white rim. The winter dorsal pelage is grayish brown which is slightly lighter in tone than the ventral pelage. The feet are dull white in color, the foreclaws are long, and the hindfeet are 2.7 to 3 cm (1.1 to 1.2 in) long. The incisive foramen (funnel-shaped opening in the bony plate of the skull, located in the roof of the mouth, immediately behind the incisor teeth where blood vessels and nerves pass) is combined with the palatal foramina, and has a wavy edge.

Moupin's pika is similar to Forrest's pika, but it has paler ventral pelage, shorter foreclaws, a narrower skull especially across the cheek bone, and buffy patches behind the ears, which do not meet around the back of the neck.

== Distribution and habitat ==
Forrest's pika occurs in the eastern Himalayas and Kangri Garpo mountains in southwestern China (northwestern Yunnan and southeastern Tibet), Bhutan, northeastern India (Arunachal Pradesh and Sikkim), and northwestern Myanmar. It is observed in the high elevation regions of northern Arunachal Pradesh, above 3,000 metres (9,800 ft) from sea level in the Tawang district, and also in high elevation regions of the West Kameng and East Kameng districts. In 1997, it occurrence was reported just north of the Upper Dibang Valley district, in Medog County, Tibet. It does not occur in present-day Assam, which belonged to the former Undivided Assam before 1972.

Forrest's pika inhabits high altitude mixed coniferous and broadleaf forests, and shrubland thickets. It is also thought to occur around rock piles. It usually occurs on south-facing mountain slopes at elevations of 2,600 to 4,400 m (8,500 to 14,400 ft) above sea level.

It is rarely found, and is one of the pika species endemic to central China, with no true population studies. (Note: The other species are the Thomas's pika (Ochotona thomasi), the Tsing-ling pika (Ochotona huangensis) and the Muli pika (Ochotona muliensis).) The black pika was thought to be common to the Yunnan Province of China where it was first described in 2000. Subsequently, in 2011, a WWF-India team on an expedition to West Kameng, India reported sighting two black pikas at an altitude of 13,000 ft in the Thembang Bapu community-conserved forest area.

== Behavior and ecology ==
Forrest's pika is a generalist herbivore. Although very little is known about its behavior and ecology, Forrest's pika is speculated to dig burrows. Very little or nothing is known about its reproduction.

== Status and conservation ==
In 1994, Forrest's pika was assessed as insufficiently known on the IUCN Red List of Endangered Species, and in 1996 its status was changed to near threatened. It was re-assessed in 2008 and 2016, and rated as a species of least concern because although the current state of its population trend is unclear, its population is not considered to be declining near the rate required to warrant the species a threatened status. Although no natural historic or ecological investigations have been done on Forrest's pika, there are no known threats to its population. It is, however, possibly threatened by the loss of montane woodlands. The Chinese regional Red List has described the species as near threatened.
