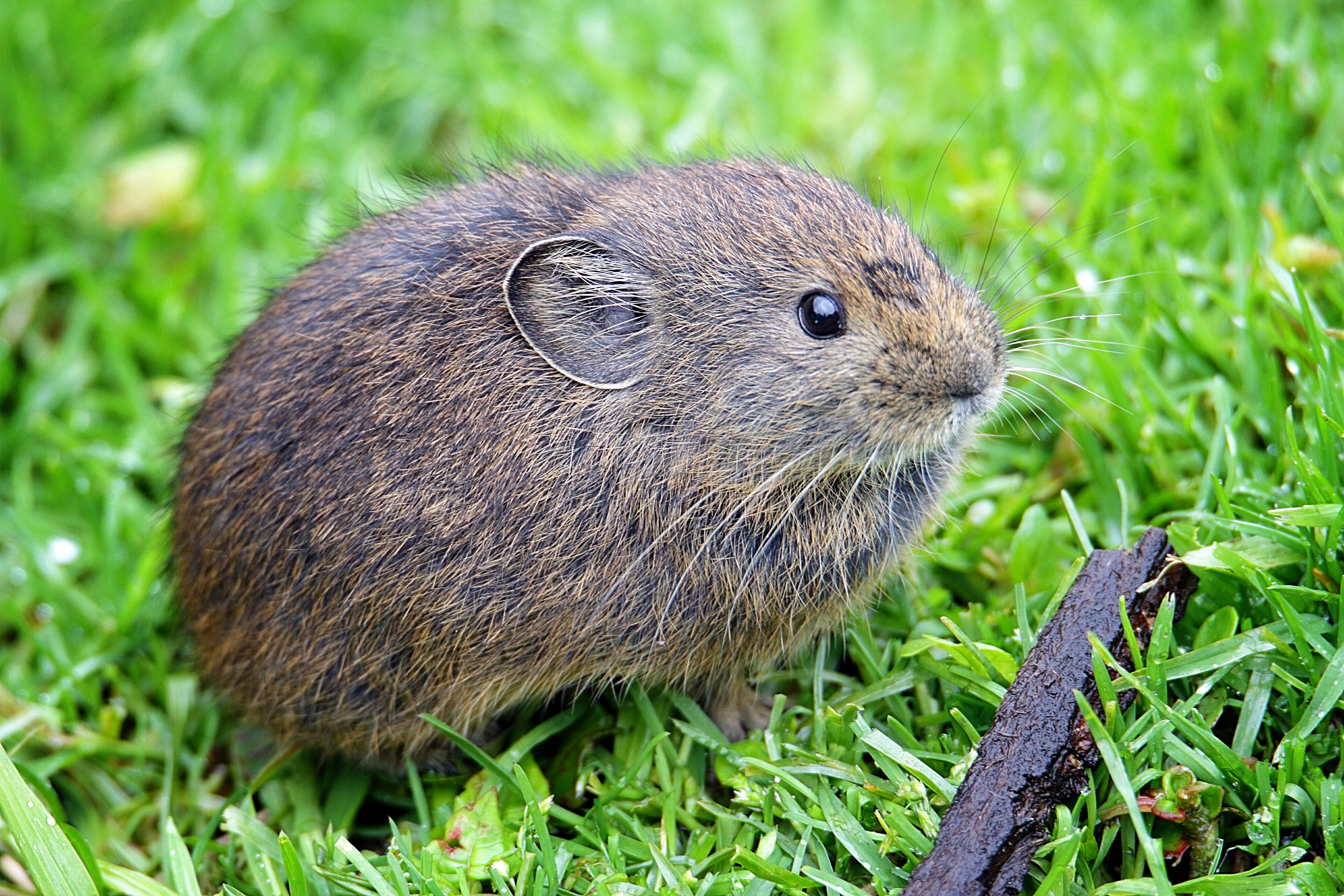
- Pika taken in Lungthung, Sikkim. This is a young Ochotona thibetana sikimaria

Conservation status
- Not evaluated (IUCN 3.1)

Scientific classification
- Kingdom: Animalia
- Phylum: Chordata
- Class: Mammalia
- Order: Lagomorpha
- Family: Ochotonidae
- Genus: Ochotona
- Species: O. sikimaria

Binomial name
- Ochotona sikimaria Thomas, 1922

Synonyms
- O. thibetana sikimaria R. S. Hoffmann & A. T. Smith, 2005

= Sikkim pika =

Species of mammal

The Sikkim pika (Ochotona sikimaria), or Sijin pika, is a species of pika known from the state of Sikkim in northeastern India. It was first described by Oldfield Thomas in 1922, but was classified as a subspecies of the Moupin pika (O. thibetana), O. t. sikimaria, until 2016, at which point it was determined to be a distinct species based on the size of its auditory bullae and DNA analysis. The species' separation was supported by later analyses of mitochondrial DNA in cytochrome b. It is closely related to the Nubra pika (O. nubrica).

The species is thought to be endangered due to habitat destruction.
