= Submyotodon =

Submyotodon Temporal range: Miocene–Present

Scientific classification
- Domain: Eukaryota
- Kingdom: Animalia
- Phylum: Chordata
- Class: Mammalia
- Order: Chiroptera
- Family: Vespertilionidae
- Subfamily: Myotinae
- Genus: Submyotodon; Ziegler, 2003

Species
- S. caliginosus S. latirostris S. moupinensis

Genus of bats

Submyotodon is a genus of vespertilionid bats, published as a new taxon in 2003 to describe a Miocene fossil species. Extant species and subspecies previously included in Myotis were later transferred to this genus. Species in this genus are referred to as broad-muzzled bats or broad-muzzled myotises.

== Taxonomy and etymology ==
Submyotodon was described as a new genus of bat in 2003, based on fossil specimens found near Eichstätt, Germany. The type species is Submyotodon petersbuchensis. The genus name Submyotodon is from the Latin prefix sub ('under' or 'close to'), + the Greek roots μῦς (mûs, 'mouse') + οὖς (oûs, ot-, 'ear') + ὀδόντος (odóntos, -odont, 'tooth'). This refers to the fact that its molars are similar to those of the mouse-eared bats, e.g. "myotodont" molars. Myotodont molars are characterized by a postcristid (enamel ridge linking the hypoconid and hypoconulid) that links to the entoconid (inner posterior cusp of a molar).

Submyotodon is the second extant genus included in the subfamily Myotinae. Before the description of Submyotodon and analysis of its phylogenetics, the only member of Myotinae was the genus Myotis.

== Species ==
=== Extant ===
- Submyotodon caliginosus (Tomes, 1859) - Himalayan broad-muzzled bat
- Submyotodon latirostris (Kishida, 1932) - Taiwan broad-muzzled bat
- Submyotodon moupinensis (Milne-Edwards, 1872) - Moupin broad-muzzled bat

=== Fossil ===
- †Submyotodon petersbuchensis Ziegler, 2003

== Range ==
The extinct S. petersbuchensis was discovered in Germany. The three extant species are found in Asia, including Taiwan, India, and China.
