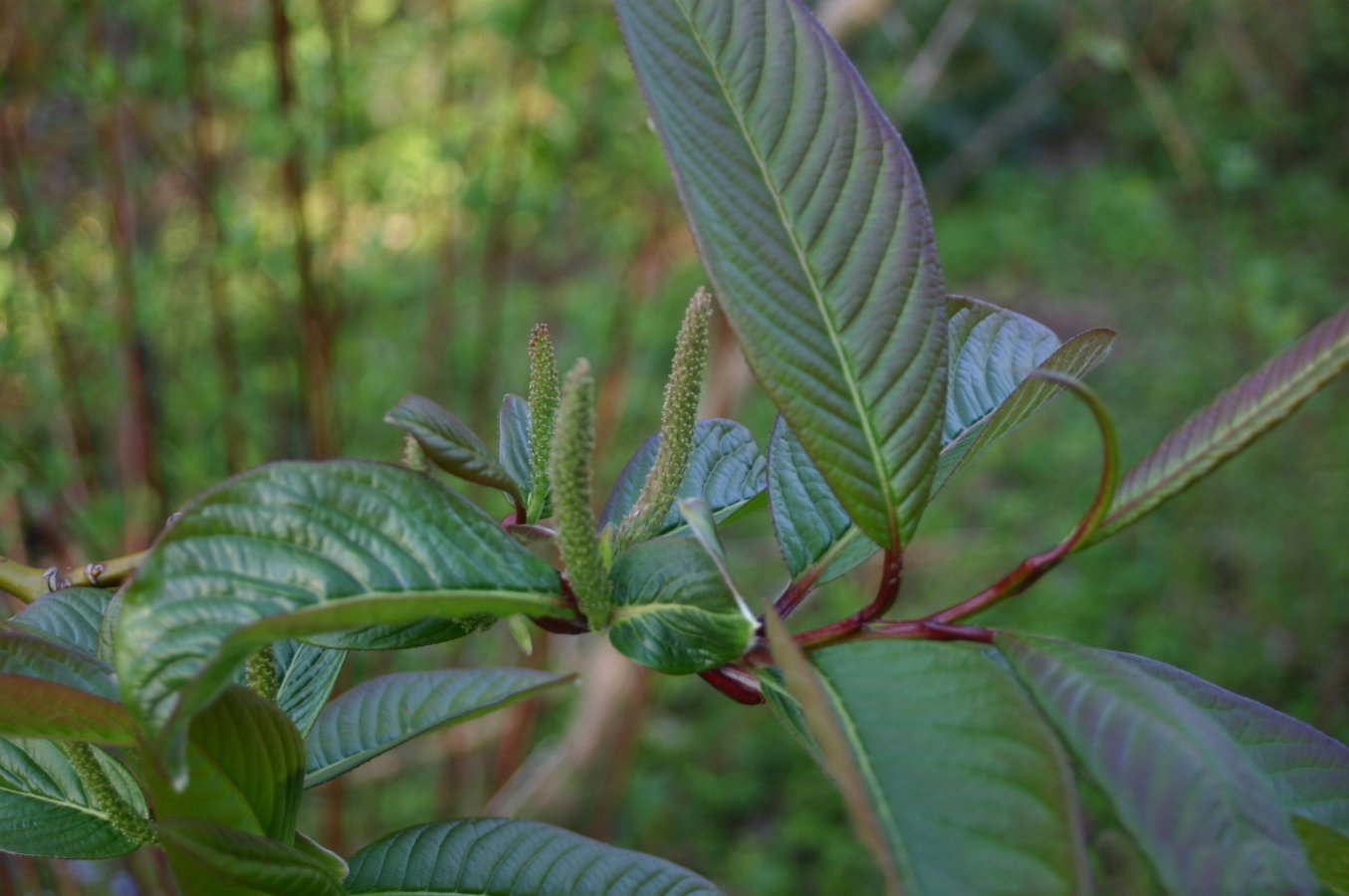
- Flowers and foliage
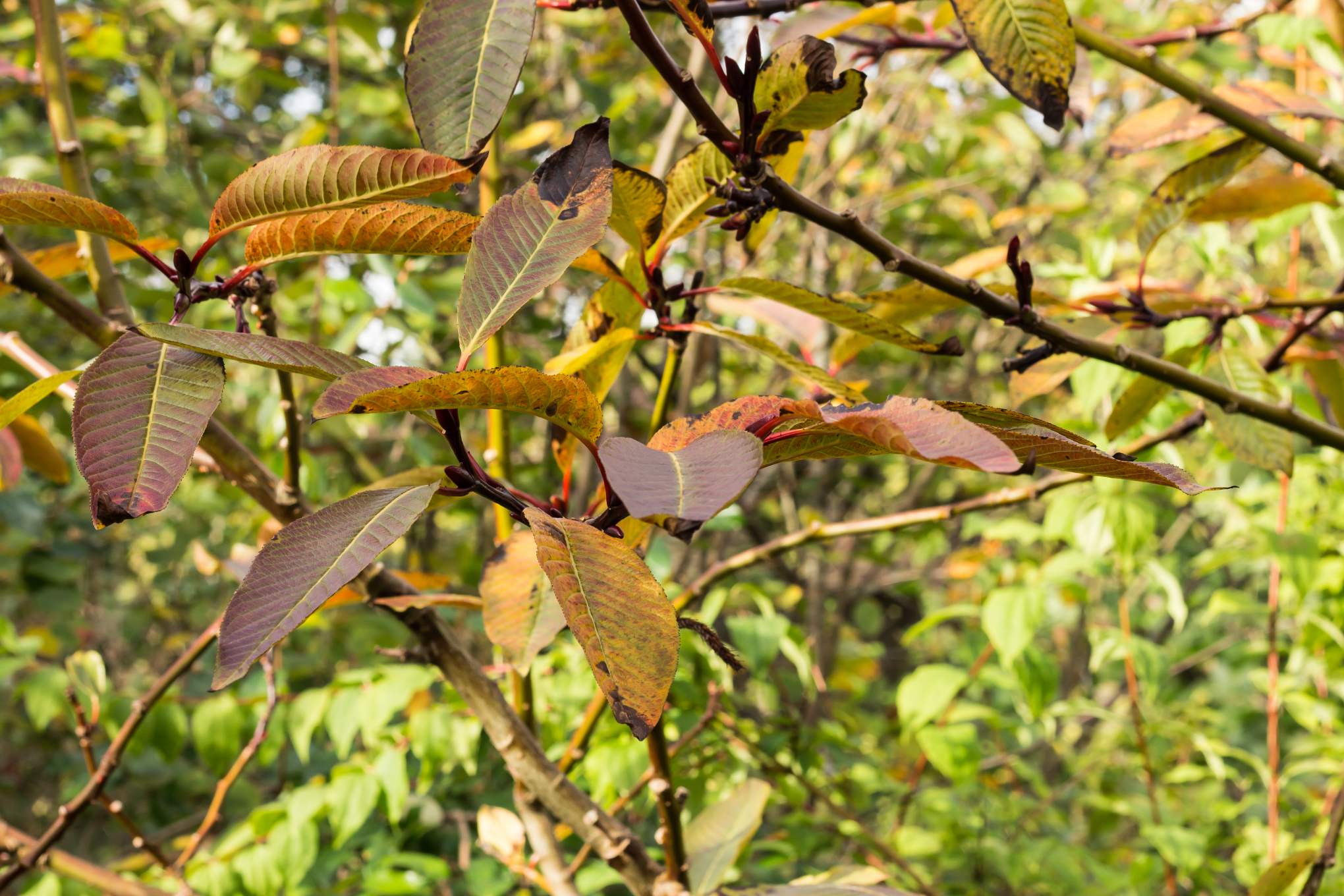
- Autumn foliage

Conservation status
- Least Concern (IUCN 3.1)

Scientific classification
- Kingdom: Plantae
- Clade: Embryophytes
- Clade: Tracheophytes
- Clade: Spermatophytes
- Clade: Angiosperms
- Clade: Eudicots
- Clade: Rosids
- Order: Malpighiales
- Family: Salicaceae
- Genus: Salix
- Species: S. moupinensis

Binomial name
- Salix moupinensis Franch.

= Salix moupinensis =

Species of flowering plant

Salix moupinensis, the Moupin willow, is a species of flowering plant in the family Salicaceae, native to western Sichuan and northern Yunnan, China. It resembles Salix fargesii and is available from commercial suppliers.

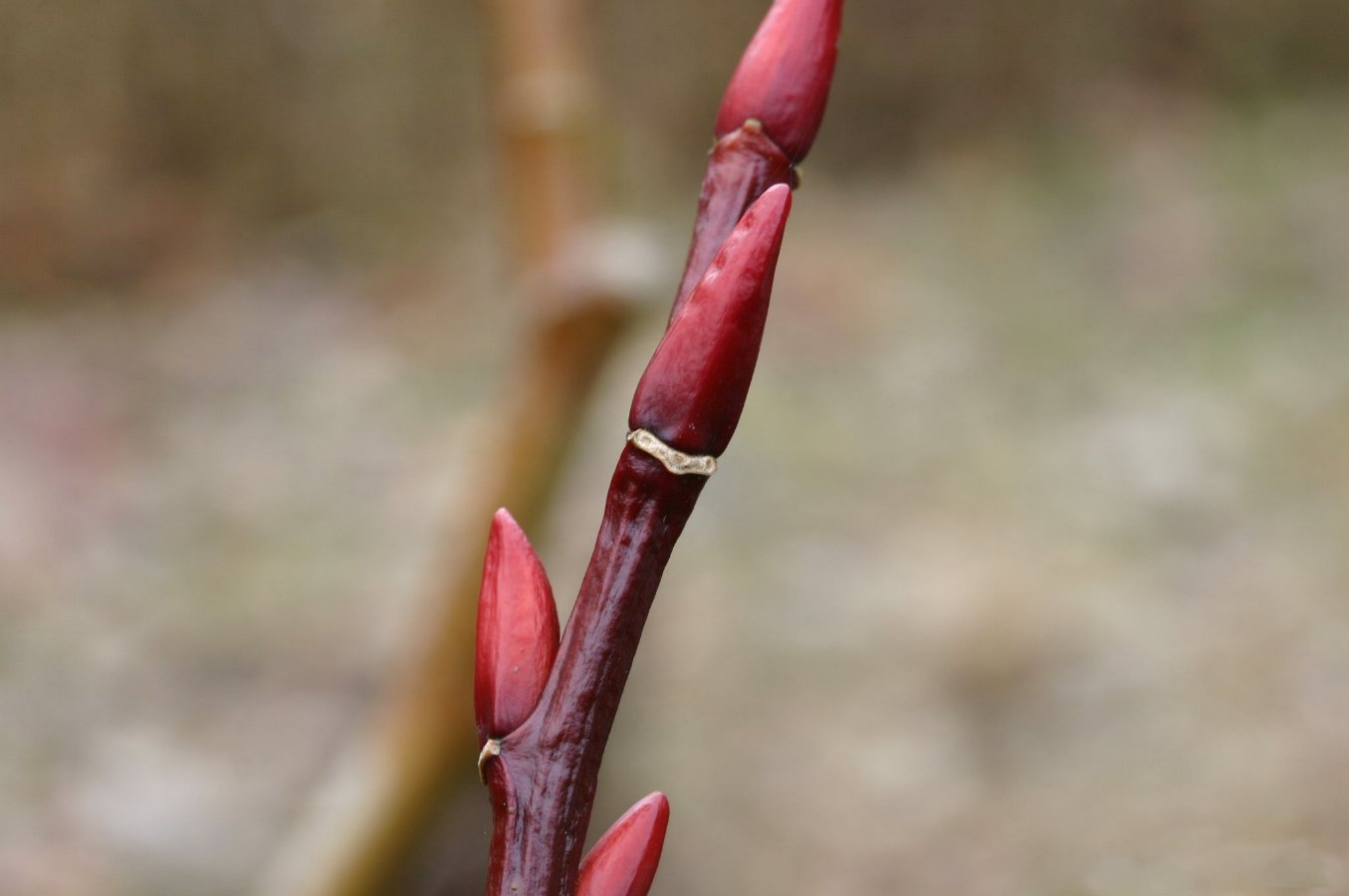
Stem and young buds

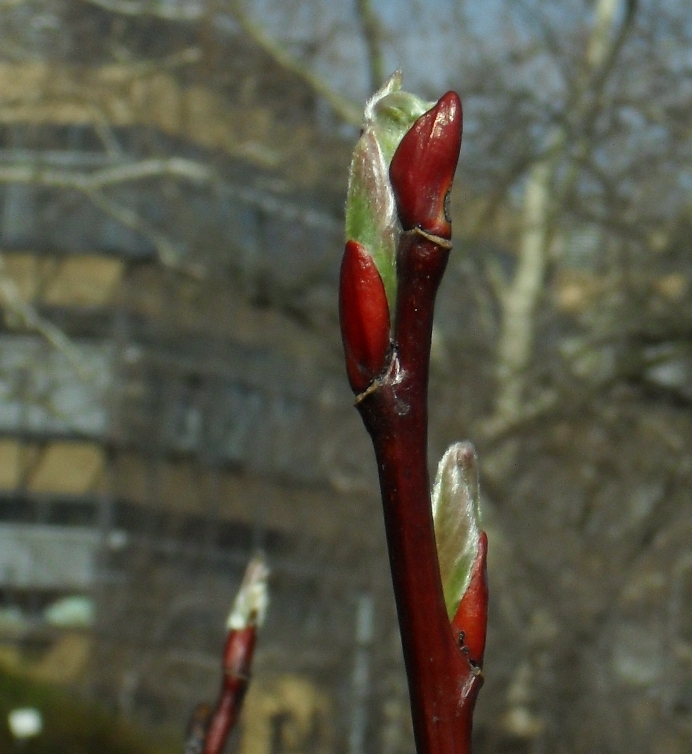
Leaves emerging
