= Theodor Karl Just =

Austrian botanist (1904–1960)

Theodor Karl Just (27 October 1904 – 14 June 1960) was an Austrian botanist and faculty member at the University of Notre Dame. He was born to Alois Just and Anna Traindl in Gross Gerungs, Austria. In 1928 he obtained his Ph.D. at the University of Vienna. He moved to the United States in 1929 and became a naturalized citizen in 1938. In 1947 he left Notre Dame to become the chief curator of the department of botany for the Chicago Natural History Museum, a position he held until the year of his death. He was the editor of American Midland Naturalist for more than 15 years, and founded Lloydia and the American Midland Naturalist Monographs series, the editorial work for which was best known. His primary contributions were in elucidating the current botanical literature and in the field of paleobotany and evolutionary biology.
