= Moupin broad-muzzled bat =

Scientific classification
- Domain: Eukaryota
- Kingdom: Animalia
- Phylum: Chordata
- Class: Mammalia
- Order: Chiroptera
- Family: Vespertilionidae
- Genus: Submyotodon
- Species: S. moupinensis

Binomial name
- Submyotodon moupinensis (Milne-Edwards, 1872)

Synonyms
- Myotis muricola moupinensis (Milne-Edwards, 1872)

Species of bat

The Moupin broad-muzzled bat (Submyotodon moupinensis) is a bat in the family Vespertilionidae endemic to southern China.

== Description ==
It has a head-body length of 40 mm (1.6 in), forearm length of 33 mm (1.3 in), and tail length of 38 mm (1.5 in). The fur is long and silky, a yellowish colour on the back, dark brownish-black on the sides and greyish below. The ears are long, with a hollow at the rear edge just below the pointed end. The wing membranes are attached to the back of the toes which are small and delicate. The tail is long and completely inclosed in the large uropatagium, the calcar has a distinct smooth outline.
