= Thomas's pika =

Conservation status
- Least Concern (IUCN 3.1)

Scientific classification
- Kingdom: Animalia
- Phylum: Chordata
- Class: Mammalia
- Order: Lagomorpha
- Family: Ochotonidae
- Genus: Ochotona
- Species: O. thomasi

Binomial name
- Ochotona thomasi Argyropulo, 1948
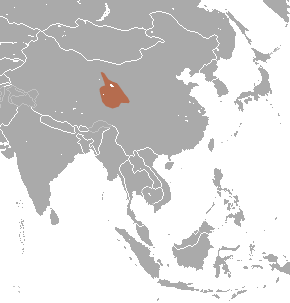
- Thomas's pika range

Synonyms
- O. ciliana Bannikov, 1940

Species of mammal

Thomas's pika (Ochotona thomasi), also known as the Thomas-pika, is a species of small mammal in the pika family, Ochotonidae. The fur on its upper body is reddish brown in summer, and mouse grey in winter. It is a generalist herbivore threatened by habitat loss, being found on isolated peaks of the eastern Qilian Mountains in Qinghai, Gansu, and northwestern Sichuan, in China. The International Union for Conservation of Nature Red List of Endangered Species assessed the animal as insufficiently known in 1994, as near threatened in 1996, and as a species of least concern in 2008.

== Taxonomy ==
Thomas's pika is a monotypic species (having no subspecies), that was first described in 1948 by the Russian zoologist A. I. Argyropulo, in the journal Trudy Zoologicheskogo Instituta. He named it after the British mammalogist Michael Rogers Oldfield Thomas. Thomas's pika is similar to the Gansu pika (Ochotona cansus), with a similar greatest skull length, but can be distinguished by its smaller skull and cheek bone width. In 1974, Feng and Kao synonymised O. t. cilanica Bannikov 1960 with Ochotona thomasi. According to Mammal Species of the World, O. ciliana Bannikov, 1940 is currently its only synonym.

== Description ==
Thomas's pika measures 10.5 to 16.5 cm (4.1 to 6.5 in) in length, and weighs 45 to 110 g (1.6 to 3.9 oz). The fragile skull is broader anteriorly, and smaller, flatter, and narrower than other pika species. The greatest skull length is 3.3 to 3.7 cm (1.3 to 1.5 in). The anterior palatine foramen (funnel-shaped opening in the bony plate of the skull, located in the roof of the mouth, immediately behind the incisor teeth where blood vessels and nerves pass) and the palatal foramen are attached, and there is no oval foramen above the frontal bone. The cheek bones are 3.36 to 3.55 cm (1.32 to 1.40 in) wide, and the ears measure 1.7 to 2.2 cm (0.67 to 0.87 in) in length. It has elongated, convex auditory bullae. The summer dorsal pelage is reddish brown, and the underparts are yellow tinged or light white in colour. The winter dorsal pelage is mouse grey in colour, and the hairs have noticeable black tips. The hindfeet are 2.2 to 2.9 cm (0.87 to 1.14 in) long.

== Distribution and habitat ==
Endemic to China, Thomas's pika is rare, and no intensive population studies have been conducted. It is found on the secluded mountains of the eastern Qilian Mountain range in Qinghai, Gansu, and northwestern Sichuan.

It inhabits meadows and isolated hilly, shrubby forests of Caragana jubata, the shrubby cinquefoil (Dasiphora fruticosa), Rhododendron, and the willow species (Salix), at elevations between 3,400 metres (11,200 ft) and 4,020 metres (13,190 ft) from sea level.

Thomas's pika is sympatric (existing in the same geographic area and thus frequently encountering) with the Gansu pika which also overlaps in part of its range with the Moupin pika (Ochotona thibetana) but there is no overlap in the ranges of Thomas's and Moupin pikas.

== Behavior and ecology ==
Thomas's pika is a diurnal burrowing species. It is a generalist herbivore, and may live in small family groups. Although its ecology is not well known, it is thought to be similar to that of the Gansu pika. Details about its behaviour and reproduction are also unknown.

== Status and conservation ==
In 1994, Thomas's pika was assessed as insufficiently known on the IUCN Red List of Endangered Species. In 1996 it was warranted a near-threatened status, and it nearly even met the vulnerable criteria (A2c + 3c) by both the IUCN and the Red List of China's Vertebrates due to a declining population of over 30% in the last ten years, in the projected ten years, or in three generations, determined based on a decreasing extant of occurrence, area of occupancy, or quality of habitat. It was re-assessed by IUCN in 2008 and rated as a species of least concern. This is because, although very little is known about its status, it is a widespread species. The current state of its population trend is unclear. It may be affected by killing due to pest control measures in its range although its effects to the species is unknown. There are no conservation measures to protect Thomas's pika.
