= Taiwan broad-muzzled bat =

Conservation status
- Least Concern (IUCN 3.1)

Scientific classification
- Kingdom: Animalia
- Phylum: Chordata
- Class: Mammalia
- Order: Chiroptera
- Family: Vespertilionidae
- Genus: Submyotodon
- Species: S. latirostris

Binomial name
- Submyotodon latirostris (Kishida, 1932)

Synonyms
- Myotis latirostris Kishida, 1932; Myotis mystacinus latirostris (Tate, 1941)

Species of bat

The Taiwan broad-muzzled bat or Taiwan broad-muzzled myotis (Submyotodon latirostris) is a species of vesper bat found in Taiwan.

== Taxonomy ==
It was described as a new species in 1932 by Japanese arachnologist Kyukichi Kishida. The holotype had been collected in Taiwan. Kishida placed it in the genus Myotis with a binomial of M. latirostris. In subsequent publications, it was considered by various authors to be a subspecies of the whiskered bat (M. mystacinus) or the wall-roosting mouse-eared bat (M. muricola). However, its lineage is basal to all other Myotis species. It is still within the Myotinae subfamily, though its morphological and genetic differences justified placing it in a separate genus.

== Description ==
It is a small species of bat, with a forearm length of 31–34 mm (1.2–1.3 in). Its skull is overall smooth and lacking crests, and the occipital bone of the braincase is distinctly raised, which is one if its identifying features. The fur of its back is long and shaggy, described as a "dark slaty brown." The tips of individual hairs are lighter brown. The fur of its belly is also dark brown, though the tips of the hairs are a more golden color.

== Range and habitat ==
It is found in Taiwan, where it is considered relatively common. It is generally encountered in mountainous areas with elevations greater than 1,000 m (3,300 ft) above sea level, though it is found in lower elevations in the winter. Its maximum elevation range is at least 2,200 m (7,200 ft) above sea level.
