= Baoxing County =

Baoxing County 宝兴县
- County
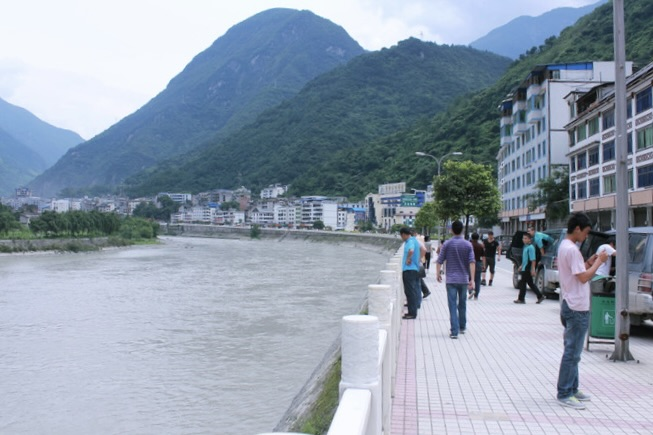

- Location in Sichuan
- Coordinates: 30°35′N 102°41′E
- Country: China
- Province: Sichuan
- Prefecture-level city: Ya'an
- County seat: Muping Town

Area
  - Total: 3,114 km^{2} (1,202 sq mi)
- Elevation: 1,011 m (3,317 ft)

Population (2020 census)
  - Total: 48,040
  - Density: 15.43/km^{2} (39.96/sq mi)
- Time zone: UTC+8 (China Standard)
- Postal code: 625700 to 625705
- Area code: 0835
- Website: yabxzc.cn (archived)

Baoxing County (simplified Chinese: 宝兴县; traditional Chinese: 寶興縣; pinyin: Bǎoxīng Xiàn) is one of the seven counties under the administration of Ya'an City, in west-central Sichuan Province, China, located along the upper reaches of the Qingyi River (Chinese: 青衣江; pinyin: Qīngyī Jiāng). It is a vital geopolitical crossroad, transportation hub, and most importantly, a biodiversity hotspot and type locality for many endangered species, including giant panda, dove tree, Chinese thrush, golden snub-nosed monkey and Oreolalax popei. UNESCO named Baoxing as a part of the World Heritage Site, the "Sichuan Giant Panda Sanctuaries - Wolong, Mt Siguniang and Jiajin Mountain" in 2006.

== History ==
=== General history ===
The history of Baoxing spans over four thousand years, though under several different names. During the Spring and Autumn period of China, it was part of the territories of the Qiang State of Qingyi founded by the Qiang people, who were native of the area. In the Qin and Han dynasties, when Han people started to immigrate to this region, Baoxing was named the "County of Qingyi" (t 青衣縣, s 青衣县, Qīngyī xiàn) and affiliated to the Prefecture of Shu. By the end of the Yuan dynasty, when it was called "Dongbu" (董卜, Dǒngbǔ), Tibetan Buddhist influence emerged in this area; many Qiang people converted to the faith and since then were perceived as a branch of Tibetan Buddhism. The name changed again in the reign of the Qianlong Emperor of the Qing dynasty, then went "Muping" (t 穆坪, Mùpíng) as the name for the same region. The county of Baoxing was not established as a political division until 1930, and because of the rich natural resources it maintains, the name "Baoxing" was officially given. This name, meaning "treasure and prosperity", originates from one of the five Confucius classics Doctrine of the Mean. In 1939, Xikang Province was established, and Baoxing was a county under its administration.

=== Post-1949 ===
Baoxing was in Xikang Province until 1955, when Xikang was merged with and became a part of Sichuan Province. Though Baoxing's significance as the biggest county of the provincial capital of Xikang Province, Ya'an City, was dimmed by this merger, its weight as the type locality and ideal resort for giant pandas has not been devalued. From 1957 to 1982, more than 15 giant pandas were chosen from Baoxing's Fengtongzhai National Natural Protected Area, and sent overseas to various nations such as the United States, Spain, France, Mexico and Japan, as gifts from China.

== Administrative divisions ==
Baoxing County comprises 3 towns, 3 townships and 1 ethnic township:

towns

- Muping Town (穆坪镇)
- Lingguan Town (灵关镇)
- Longdong Town (陇东镇)

townships

- Fengtongzhai Township (蜂桶寨乡)
- Wulong Township (五龙乡)
- Daxi Township (大溪乡)

ethnic township

- Qiaoqi Tibetan Ethnic Township (硗碛藏族乡)

== Geography and climate ==
Baoxing is located in the north of Ya'an City and the west of Sichuan province, and has an area of 3,114 km^{2} (1,202 sq mi). Its area consists of primarily mountainous terrain that is part of the Qionglai Mountains, with many lesser hills, ravines, slopes, valleys and rivers. Elevations rising from southeast to northwest, and the highest point is Mount Shilama (石喇嘛山) at 5,328 m (17,480 ft), while the lowest is Lingguan Gap at 750 m (2,460 ft); the county seat Muping Town lies at 1,011 m (3,317 ft). The varied terrain in Baoxing gives rise to wide variations in climate, though the climate is generally temperate and displays strong monsoonal influences. The annual precipitation is 912.2 mm (35.91 in).

Baoxing River, which springs from the south ridge of the Jiajin Mountains (夹金山), is the major water source of the Qingyi River system. Baoxing River traverses the county, as well as many lesser rivers and streams. It has been estimated that these rivers has an electricity generating capacity of more than 140 million kilowatts.

Climate data for Baoxing, elevation 1,022 m (3,353 ft), (1991–2020 normals, extremes 1981–present)
Month	Jan	Feb	Mar	Apr	May	Jun	Jul	Aug	Sep	Oct	Nov	Dec	Year
Record high °C (°F)	19.5 (67.1)	22.3 (72.1)	30.3 (86.5)	32.0 (89.6)	33.2 (91.8)	34.0 (93.2)	34.8 (94.6)	34.1 (93.4)	33.4 (92.1)	27.0 (80.6)	22.8 (73.0)	19.3 (66.7)	34.8 (94.6)
Mean daily maximum °C (°F)	8.1 (46.6)	10.5 (50.9)	15.2 (59.4)	20.6 (69.1)	23.9 (75.0)	26.1 (79.0)	28.1 (82.6)	27.9 (82.2)	23.7 (74.7)	18.9 (66.0)	14.6 (58.3)	9.7 (49.5)	18.9 (66.1)
Daily mean °C (°F)	4.9 (40.8)	6.9 (44.4)	10.7 (51.3)	15.3 (59.5)	18.5 (65.3)	20.9 (69.6)	22.8 (73.0)	22.6 (72.7)	19.3 (66.7)	15.2 (59.4)	11.2 (52.2)	6.4 (43.5)	14.6 (58.2)
Mean daily minimum °C (°F)	2.5 (36.5)	4.2 (39.6)	7.5 (45.5)	11.6 (52.9)	14.9 (58.8)	17.6 (63.7)	19.4 (66.9)	19.4 (66.9)	16.8 (62.2)	13.0 (55.4)	8.8 (47.8)	4.0 (39.2)	11.6 (53.0)
Record low °C (°F)	−4.2 (24.4)	−4.1 (24.6)	−2.2 (28.0)	2.0 (35.6)	6.8 (44.2)	11.6 (52.9)	14.5 (58.1)	14.4 (57.9)	10.5 (50.9)	4.4 (39.9)	0.3 (32.5)	−4.8 (23.4)	−4.8 (23.4)
Average precipitation mm (inches)	2.5 (0.10)	8.0 (0.31)	29.8 (1.17)	66.7 (2.63)	96.0 (3.78)	141.7 (5.58)	207.3 (8.16)	224.1 (8.82)	118.3 (4.66)	48.7 (1.92)	11.5 (0.45)	2.4 (0.09)	957 (37.67)
Average precipitation days (≥ 0.1 mm)	4.9	7.4	13.0	16.3	19.0	21.9	21.6	20.7	20.3	17.4	7.3	3.3	173.1
Average snowy days	5.4	2.6	0.2	0	0	0	0	0	0	0	0.1	1.4	9.7
Average relative humidity (%)	73	73	74	74	76	80	82	82	84	83	78	74	78
Mean monthly sunshine hours	48.7	44.6	60.3	76.5	83.3	70.5	91.1	92.8	51.0	41.9	48.8	53.1	762.6
Percentage possible sunshine	15	14	16	20	20	17	21	23	14	12	15	17	17
Source: China Meteorological Administration

Climate data for Qiaoqi Township (1991–2018 normals)
Month	Jan	Feb	Mar	Apr	May	Jun	Jul	Aug	Sep	Oct	Nov	Dec	Year
Mean daily maximum °C (°F)	5.7 (42.3)	8.6 (47.5)	12.8 (55.0)	16.9 (62.4)	19.3 (66.7)	20.4 (68.7)	22.8 (73.0)	22.6 (72.7)	19.1 (66.4)	14.6 (58.3)	11.0 (51.8)	6.9 (44.4)	15.1 (59.1)
Daily mean °C (°F)	0.0 (32.0)	2.6 (36.7)	6.5 (43.7)	10.7 (51.3)	13.3 (55.9)	15.4 (59.7)	17.9 (64.2)	17.4 (63.3)	14.3 (57.7)	9.7 (49.5)	5.4 (41.7)	1.3 (34.3)	9.5 (49.2)
Mean daily minimum °C (°F)	−5.8 (21.6)	−3.4 (25.9)	0.2 (32.4)	4.5 (40.1)	7.4 (45.3)	10.5 (50.9)	13.0 (55.4)	12.2 (54.0)	9.6 (49.3)	4.8 (40.6)	−0.1 (31.8)	−3.8 (25.2)	4.1 (39.4)
Average precipitation mm (inches)	5.1 (0.20)	9.1 (0.36)	23.4 (0.92)	53.0 (2.09)	101.9 (4.01)	142.6 (5.61)	119.8 (4.72)	102.0 (4.02)	110.5 (4.35)	60.2 (2.37)	17.1 (0.67)	5.9 (0.23)	750.6 (29.55)
Source: Baidu

== Demography ==
Located at the eastern part of the historical region of Kham (Eastern Tibet), which is often recognized as the Ethic and Religion Corridor of Southwest China, Baoxing merges a number of culturally and linguistically distinct ethnic groups and subgroups. To name a few, Han, Qiang, Tibetan, Nakhi, and Gyalrong Tibetan. This well-mingled hybrid of population was proved to be of considerable influence on Baoxing's geopolitical and transportation significance throughout history.

=== Transport ===
Baoxing's geographical location determines its identity as a transportation hub between Kham and the Sichuan Basin. Bordering two big counties (namely, Dayi and Tianquan) to its east and south, where Han people is the majority ethnicity, Baoxing connects Ngawa Tibetan and Qiang Autonomous Prefecture at Xiaojin County and Danba County, whose populations are largely Tibetan and Qiang people. The active tradings among different ethnicity groups in this region could be traced back to more than 800 years ago, when the first Tea Horse Road started to take shape.

=== Geopolitical crossroad ===
The complexity in Baoxing's demography and importance in its transportation value, plus its critical location, has made Baoxing a vital site for different military, commercial and political powers. The Tea and Horse road between Sichuan and Tibet, since its start in the Tang dynasty, put Baoxing and Kangding as two major stop-over sites and mid-way markets for commuting merchants, salt-carriers, Han tea sellers(most of them from Sichuan), Tibetan horse traders etc.

=== Religion ===
Tibetan Buddhism, Chinese Buddhism, Taoism, Christianity (predominantly Catholic) and indigenous religions including Nature Worship and Urreligion are the most commonly seen religions and practices in ethnic groups of Baoxing. Branches in Tibetan Buddhism are also well represented.

== Biodiversity ==
Baoxing was named by UNESCO as a World Heritage Site in 2006. Jiajin Mountains, which is located in Baoxing County, is the core area of the World Heritage site "Sichuan Giant Panda Sanctuary", along with Wolong and Mount Siguniang. While Baoxing is only one part of the core areas in the World Heritage Site, it distinguishes itself from all other giant panda reserves, as the giant panda was first discovered there and reported, in 1869, by the French missionary Armand David in Dengchigou, Baoxing County in the Jiajin Mountains.

=== Type locality ===
Baoxing is renowned as the type locality to many species, to name a few of the most famous ones, are the giant panda, dove tree, and golden snub-nosed monkey.

=== UNESCO World Heritage Site ===
The UNESCO named the World Heritage Site of Sichuan Giant Panda Sanctuary – Wolong, Mt. Siguniang and Jiajin Mountains in 2006 after it was nominated in 2002. After being officially recognized as an integral part of the World Heritage site, Baoxing needs to conform with the rules and standards set by UNESCO to maintain its status as a World Heritage.

== List of endangered species with Baoxing as the type locality ==
- Giant panda
- Dove tree
- Chinese thrush
- Golden snub-nosed monkey
- Oreolalax popei

== See also ==
- Armand David
- Ya'an
- Sichuan
- Giant panda
- Sichuan Giant Panda Sanctuaries, Fengtongzhai Nature Reserve
