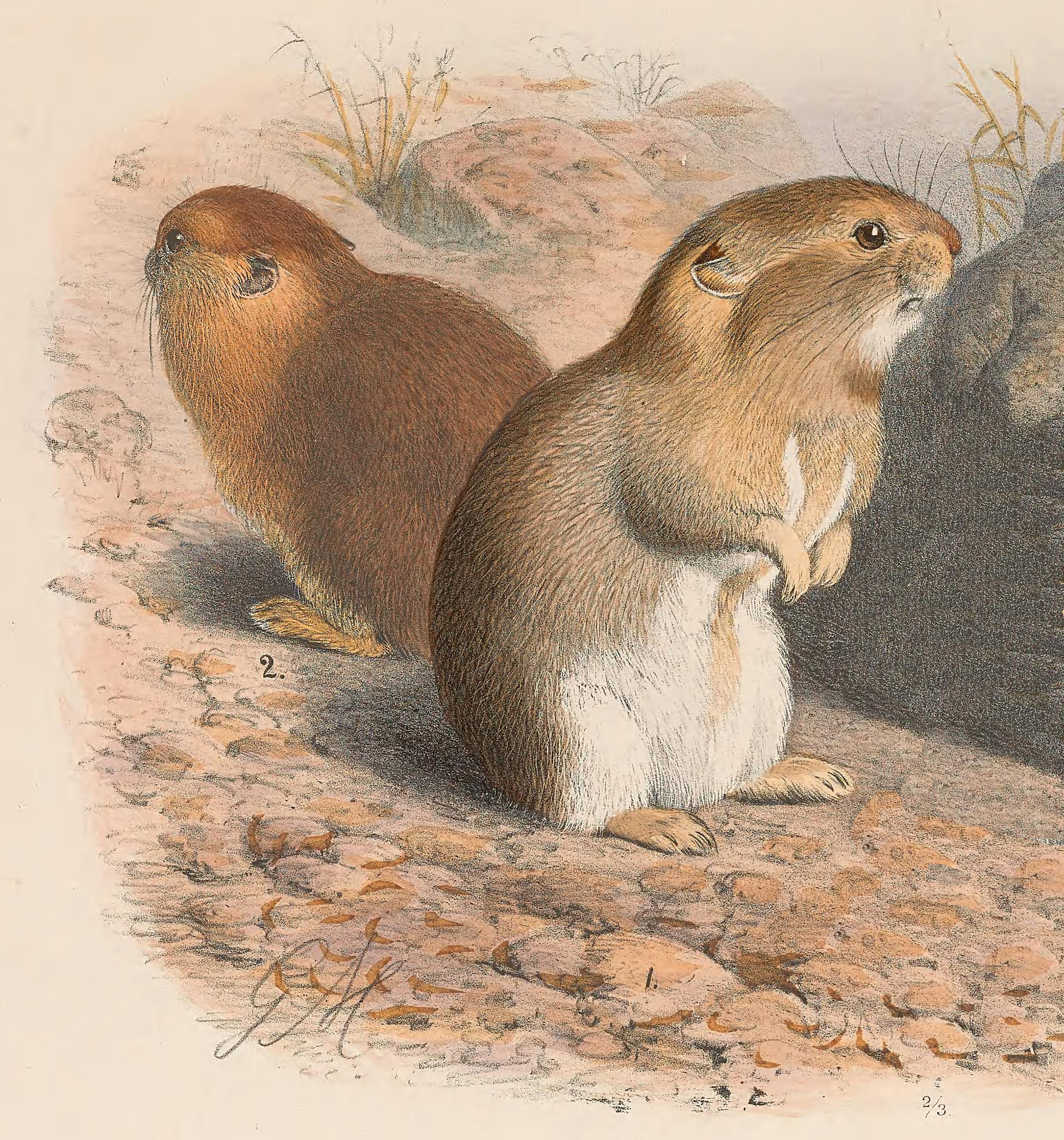

Conservation status
- Least Concern (IUCN 3.1)

Scientific classification
- Kingdom: Animalia
- Phylum: Chordata
- Class: Mammalia
- Infraclass: Placentalia
- Order: Lagomorpha
- Family: Ochotonidae
- Genus: Ochotona
- Species: O. cansus

Binomial name
- Ochotona cansus Lyon, 1907
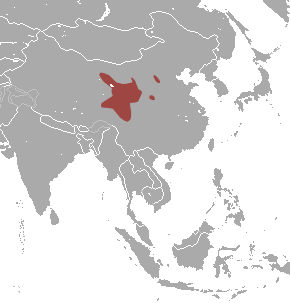
- Gansu pika range

= Gansu pika =

Species of mammal

The Gansu pika (Ochotona cansus) or gray pika is a species of mammal in the pika family, Ochotonidae. They are endemic to the Qinling mountains of China and tend to live in shrubby, high elevation environments. This small creature prefers to live near natural mounds so they can use them to search for predators and escape easily. The International Union for Conservation of Nature considers it a least-concern species, but pesticide application may threaten certain populations.

== Pikas ==
The word "pika" is derived from the genus Ochotona, which classifies them as deviants from rodents because they do not have tails, they have dense, soft fur all over their bodies (including their feet), rounded ears, and they have shorter hind legs. Gansu pikas are pikas that are primarily found in Northern China in regions such as Shanxi, Qinghai, Tibet [or Xizang], Shaanxi, Sichuan, Gansu. Like other pikas, Gansu pikas are herbivores that feed on shrubbery native to their habitat such as shrubby cinquefoil (potentilla fruticosa) and Caragana jubata. They are not endangered, unlike other subspecies of pika.

== Description ==
The gansu pika is similar in appearance to the Moupin pika (O. thibetana), having a drab gray fur coat in winter and a variable dark- to light-brown pelage in summer. It is generally distinguished by its smaller size and overall lighter fur color. The gansu pika's underside is covered in white hairs, with some buff inclusions and a pale stripe that goes from the chest to the abdomen. The small ears are blackish grey, and appear white at the edges. The feet are tan or buff above and dark brown to grey on the soles, which are heavily furred and do not have footpads.

== Ecology ==
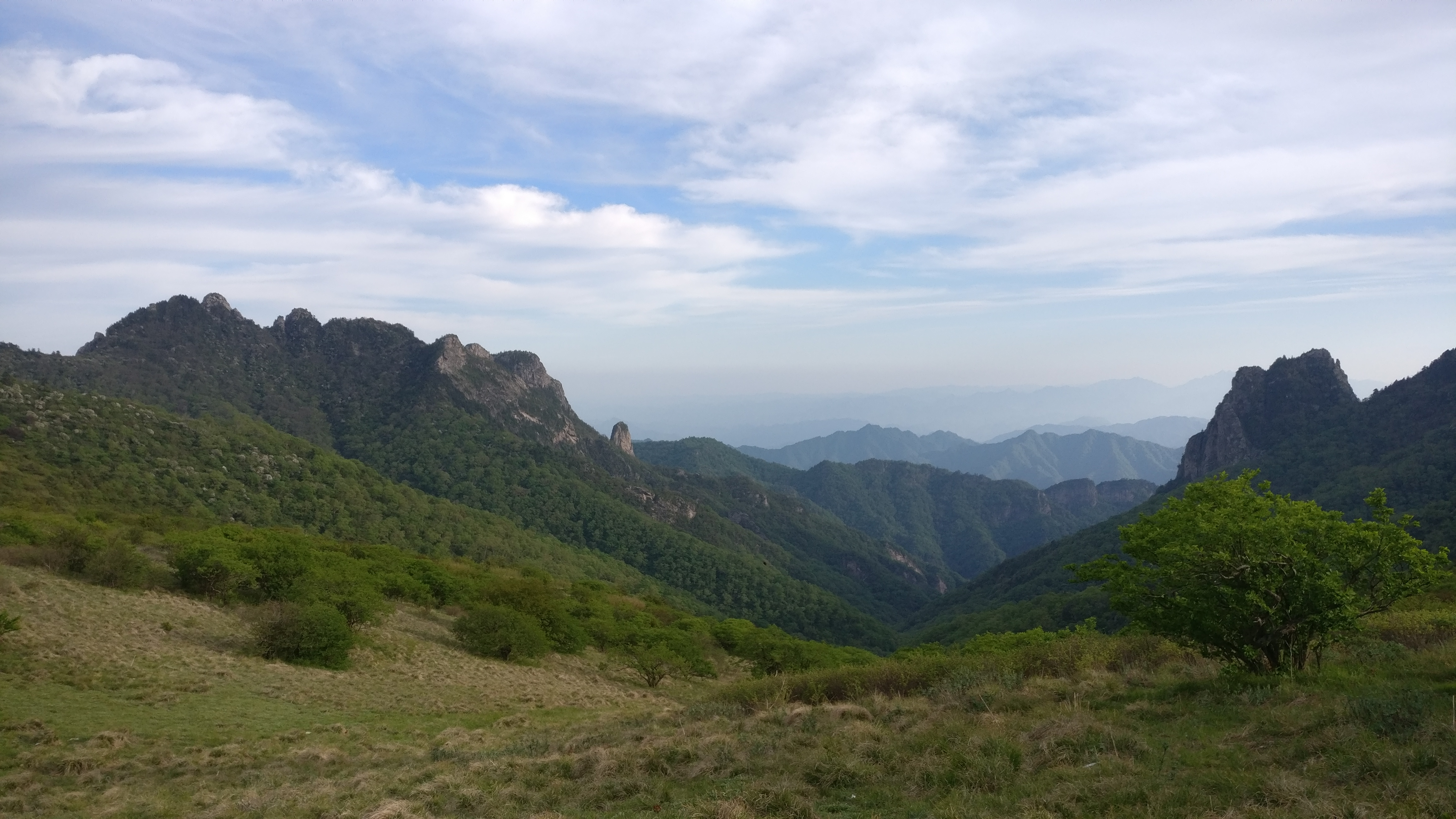
The Qinling mountains, which make up most of the Gansu pika's habitat

Gansu pikas are diurnal herbivores that construct large hay-piles to survive the winter. The hay-piles average at 18.4 kilograms, or 40 pounds, and are composed primarily of dicots but also contain dicotyledonous (broadleaf) and monocotyledonous (grass) plants. The hay-piles are used as a winter food source and adapt to harsh winter environments.

== Evolution ==
Although similar to other pikas in East Asia such as Plateau pika, Yellow River pika, and the Tibetan pika, the Gansu pika is a product of adaptive convergence, meaning that it species that have evolved to have similar traits of features independently; they do not share a common ancestor and are not genetically related. Based on DNA analysis, the Gansu pika shares a maternal lineage with the Daurian pika (Ochotona dauurica), whereas the Plateau, Yellow River, and the Tibetan pikas share a separate maternal ancestor. This divergence is likely due to major changes in terrain and climate during the Late Pliocene and early Pleistocene, when the Qinghai-Tibet Plateau experienced significant uplift and new mountain ranges formed over 6.15 million years ago. These tectonic events, combined with the onset of glacial periods, created isolated habitats and harsher environmental conditions that drove rapid adaptation and speciation.

== Mating ==
Pregnancies for this small, mountain creature last about 20 days and yield litters of about 3 to 6 babies. The breeding period is from early spring to late summer (April to August) and yields up to three litters per year.

== Conservation ==
The IUCN considers the gansu pika to not be subject to any major threats. One subspecies, O. c. sorella, has not been seen in over 70 years, and its disappearance has been tentatively attributed to widespread pesticide use.
