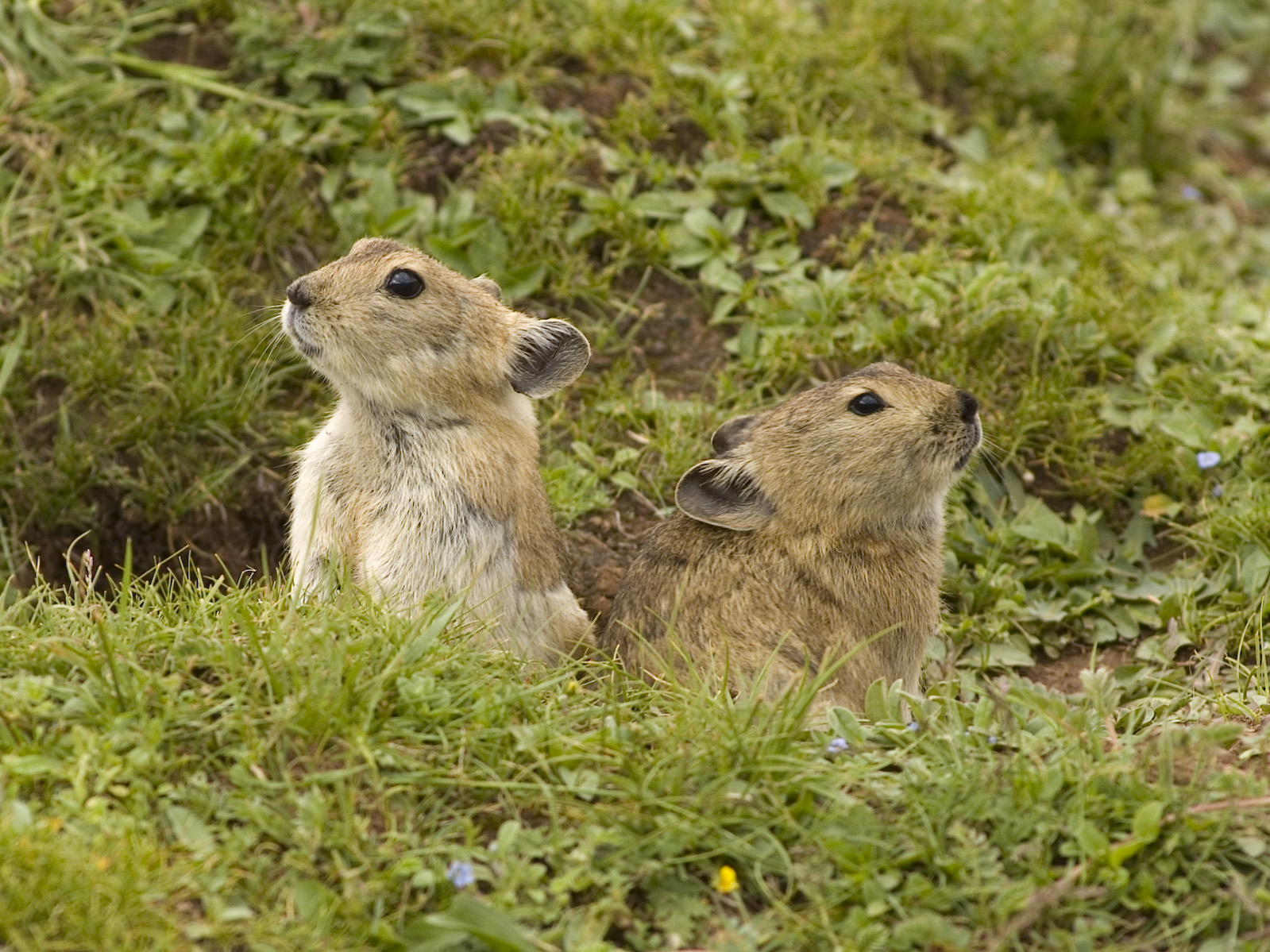

Conservation status
- Least Concern (IUCN 3.1)

Scientific classification
- Kingdom: Animalia
- Phylum: Chordata
- Class: Mammalia
- Order: Lagomorpha
- Family: Ochotonidae
- Genus: Ochotona
- Species: O. curzoniae

Binomial name
- Ochotona curzoniae (Hodgson, 1858)
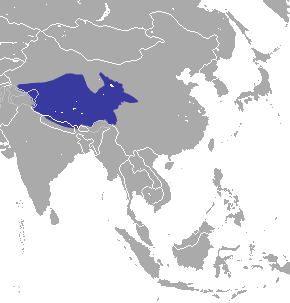
- Plateau pika range

= Plateau pika =

Species of mammal

The plateau pika (Ochotona curzoniae), also known as the black-lipped pika, is a species of mammal in the pika family, Ochotonidae.

It is a small diurnal and non-hibernating mammal weighing about 140 g (4.9 oz) when fully grown. The animals are reddish tan on the top-side with more of a whitish yellow on their under-belly.

It prefers to live in elevations of 3,100 to 5,000 m (10,200 to 16,400 ft), mostly in the Tibetan Plateau, which is where the common name originates from. The species is found in China, India, and Nepal in high alpine deserts, steppe and meadows, as well as tropical and subtropical montane forests.

== Role in the ecosystem ==
The plateau pika is considered to be a keystone species as it plays a role in recycling nutrients in soil, providing food to predators such as foxes, weasels, falcons, Asia pole cats, upland buzzards, and owls. In Hoh Xil (northern part of the Tibetan Plateau), the plateau pika is the favorite food of the area's brown bears.

In addition to its role as a prey base, the plateau pika is important for soil health in meadows; the burrowing of the species helps to aerate the soil. It also provides microhabitats by increasing plant richness and its burrows provide nests for small birds and reptiles.

== Mating ==
The plateau pika forms both monogamous and polygynandrous groups, which contain about three males and 3 to 4 females per family along with their offspring. Females can produce 2 to 5 litters of about 2 to 7 offspring with a three-week interval in between each litter which is why this group of lagomorphs are known to have the fastest growth rates of their order. Their breeding season lasts from April to August and the young do not disperse in the year of birth. Males form hierarchies and females are usually philopatric forming reproductive alliances, helping each other in the care of their offspring, males also contribute in parental care when deterring a predator by emitting an alarm call. Pikas are social animals that live in families of two to five adults and their offspring. Males and females both contribute in protecting their family groups from intruders displaying aggressive behaviors towards others who are not part of their family.

== Adaptations ==
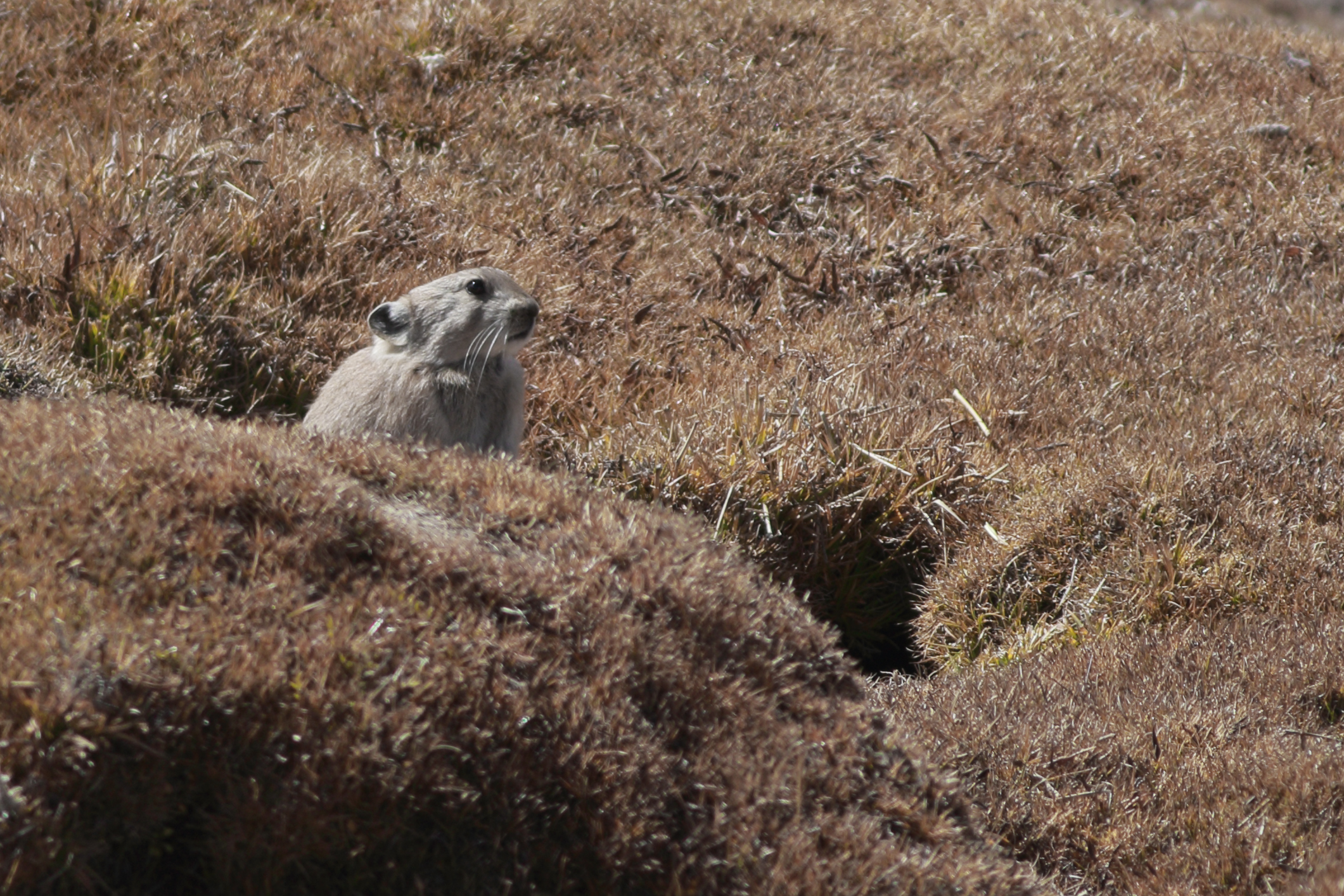
From North Sikkim, India

Since the plateau pika lives in such extremely cold environments and is a non-hibernating species, it has acquired physiological adaptations to better assist with its survival. These adaptations include a high resting metabolic rate and non-shivering thermogenesis along with the production of leptin.

Unlike hibernating mammals, plateau pikas do not merely rely on excess body fat to combat extremely cold climates. One important physiological adaptation is their ability to alter the type of their adipose tissue, from white to brown, which promotes non-shivering thermogenesis.

Due to the extremely high altitudes, the plateau pika faces risks posed by hypoxia. It evolved a lower maximum heart rate. This allows enhanced and more protected cardiac function by minimizing stress on the heart from the altitude. The plateau pika has also evolved an increase in oxygen regulation throughout the bloodstream and tissues to fight off the harmful effects of decreased oxygen. It also adapted an ability to concentrate metabolic function on the heart and lungs through the lessening of oxygen reliance by reduced fatty acid metabolism. The plateau pika has adapted a strengthened myocardial connective tissue band in the heart, an ability to stabilize its bodily environment, and is able to lessen hypoxic damage from immune regulation.

== Conservation and management ==
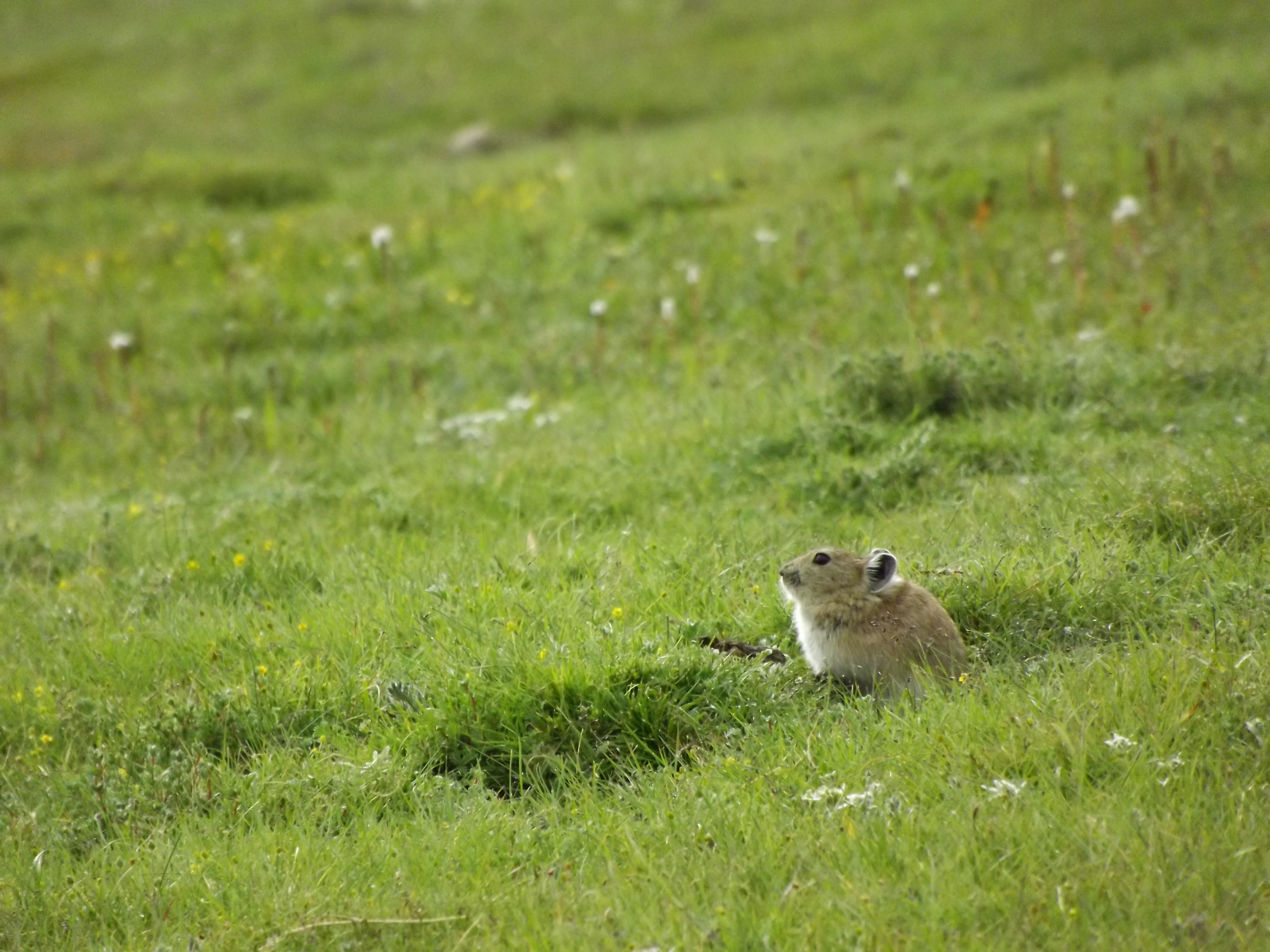
In Amdo of the northern Tibetan Plateau

The species is currently considered threatened, mostly due to aggressive poisoning campaigns by Chinese populations, predominantly to eliminate competition for food with livestock. The plateau pika is considered a keystone species and also considered a pest because of the degradation it causes to crops. This causes a competition in foraging with the livestock of farmers such as yaks, sheep, and horses, which in turn affects their livelihood. Conservation efforts for the Plateau pika have focused on a number of strategies. One approach has been to raise awareness among local communities about the important role that the pika plays in the ecosystem and to promote more sustainable farming practices that do not rely on exterminating the animals. This can involve providing alternative methods for protecting crops, such as using fencing or other physical barriers.

Another strategy has been to establish protected areas where the pika and other wildlife can thrive without interference from human activities. For example, the Sanjiangyuan National Nature Reserve in China, which encompasses much of the Tibetan Plateau, has been designated as a protected area for the pika and other endangered species.

Finally, some researchers have been studying the biology and behavior of the Plateau pika in order to better understand the species and its role in the ecosystem. This information can then be used to inform conservation efforts and management strategies.

Overall, conservation efforts for the plateau pika are aimed at ensuring the long-term survival of the species while also promoting sustainable development in the region. By working to protect this important component of the high-altitude ecosystem, conservationists hope to maintain the ecological integrity and biodiversity of the region for generations to come.
