= Moupin pika =

Conservation status
- Least Concern (IUCN 3.1)

Scientific classification
- Kingdom: Animalia
- Phylum: Chordata
- Class: Mammalia
- Order: Lagomorpha
- Family: Ochotonidae
- Genus: Ochotona
- Species: O. thibetana

Binomial name
- Ochotona thibetana (A. Milne-Edwards, 1871)

Subspecies
- O. t. nangquenica Zheng et al., 1980; O. t. osgoodi Anthony, 1922; O. t. sacraria Thomas, 1923; O. t. sikimaria Thomas, 1922; O. t. thibetana Milne-Edwards, 1871
- Moupin pika range

Synonyms
- O. hodgsoni Bonhote, 1905; O. nangquenica Zheng et al., 1980; O. osgoodi Anthony, 1922; O. sacraria Thomas, 1923; O. sikimaria Thomas, 1922; O. zappeyi Thomas, 1922

Species of mammal

The Moupin pika (Ochotona thibetana), also known as Moupin-pika, and Manipuri pika, is a species of mammal in the pika family, Ochotonidae. It has many subspecies, some of which may be distinct species. Its summer pelage is dark russet-brown with some light spots on the dorsal side, and ochraceous buff tinged on the belly. In winter it is lighter, with buff to dull brown dorsal pelage. A generalist herbivore, it is found in the mountains of the eastern Tibetan Plateau in China (Gansu, southern Qinghai, Yunnan, and Sichuan), Bhutan, India (Sikkim), and northern Myanmar. Both the International Union for Conservation of Nature Red List of Endangered Species and the Red List of China's Vertebrates classify it as a species of least concern; although one subspecies may be endangered.

== Taxonomy ==
The Moupin pika was first described in 1871 by the French mammalogist and ornithologist Alphonse Milne-Edwards. There are five recognized subspecies according to the Mammals Species of the World:

- Ochotona thibetana. nangquenica Zheng et al., 1980
- Ochotona thibetana osgoodi Anthony, 1922
- Ochotona thibetana sacraria Thomas, 1923
- Ochotona thibetana sikimaria Thomas, 1922* Recently declared a separate species
- Ochotona thibetana thibetana Milne-Edwards, 1871

The Gansu pika (Ochotona cansus) was previously treated as a subspecies of the Moupin pika, but is now considered a separate species based on its skull characteristics—shorter skull and a narrower interorbital region and zygomatic arch—and because intermediate forms do not occur in the extensive zones of sympatry. The Forrest's pika (Ochotona forresti) was also a former subspecies, but it was listed as separate species by Feng and Zheng in 1985.

In 1951, Ellerman and Morrison-Scott listed the O. t. osgoodi as a subspecies of the steppe pika (Ochotona pusilla) but in 1978, Corbet, and in 1982, Weston, based on morphometric analysis, included it in the Moupin pika. O. t. sikimaria was assigned to the Gansu pika by Feng and Kao in 1974, and by Feng and Zheng in 1985 because Thomas compared the subspecies to O. c. sorella in his original description. However, based on holotype analysis, O. t. sikimaria was found to have a longer skull and a wider interorbital region and zygomatic arch than the Gansu pika. The subspecies O. n. lama, O. n. aliensis, and O. n. lhasaensis were formerly assigned to the Moupin pika, but they are now considered to belong to the Nubra pika (Ochotona nubrica).

Ochotona thibetana sikimaria may be a treated as a separate species due to its widely separate geography than that of the other Moupin pika. It can be distinguished from other subgroups based on a different protrusion of the skull and variations in its genetic data. O. t. sacraria and O. t. xunhuaensis may also represent separate species, as they appear genetically very distinct from the other Moupin pika.

In 1938, Allen synonymized the Qinling pika (Ochotona syrinx) with O. t. huangensis. This assignment was followed by Ellerman and Morrison-Scott in 1951, by Gureev in 1964, and by Weston in 1982. In 1938 Allen, in 1951 Ellerman and Morrison-Scott, and in 1982 Weston synonymized O. t. sacraria with O. t. thibetana, but in 1974, Feng and Kao, and in 1985, Feng and Zheng listed it as a subspecies of the Moupin pika.

== Description ==
A fairly small pika, the Moupin pika measures 14 to 18 cm (5.5 to 7.1 in) in length, and weighs 71 to 136 g (2.5 to 4.8 oz). The skull is 3.6 to 4.2 cm (1.4 to 1.7 in) in length, and is larger than that of the Gansu pika. The frontal bone is flat and low, and has no alveolus above it. The auditory bullae are small, and the posterior processes of the cheek bone are almost parallel. The anterior palatine foramen (funnel-shaped opening in the bony plate of the skull, located in the roof of the mouth, immediately behind the incisor teeth where blood vessels and nerves pass) and the palatal foramen are combined. In summer, the dorsal pelage is dark russet-brown overall in color with some light spots and the ventral pelage is ochraceous buff-tinged; however, O. t. xunhuaensis has grayish ventral pelage, and a russet throat collar. It has a buff coloured collar along the middle line of the belly. The winter dorsal pelage is buff to dull brown. It has dark brown ears, measuring 1.7 to 2.3 cm (0.67 to 0.91 in) in length, and having white, narrow borders along its edges. The sole of the feet are furred. The hindfeet are 2.4 to 3.2 cm (0.94 to 1.26 in) long.

== Distribution and habitat ==
The species' range includes the mountains of the eastern Tibetan Plateau in Gansu, southern Qinghai, Yunnan, and Sichuan in China; in Bhutan; in Sikkim in India; and in northern Myanmar. The nominate subspecies O. t. thibetana occurs in southern Qinghai, western Sichuan, southeastern Tibet, and northwestern Yunnan; O. t. nangquenica occurs in Tibet; O. t. sacraria occurs in western Sichuan; O. t. osgoodi occurs in northeastern Myanmar; O. t. sikimaria occurs in Sikkim; and O. t. xunhuaensis occurs in eastern Qinghai.

It is found in rocky regions under canopies of Rhododendron and bamboo forests at lower elevations, and in subalpine forests in the higher parts of its distribution. While recorded at altitudes as low as 1,800 meters (5,900 ft) above sea level, it favors elevations of 2,400 to 4,100 m (7,900 to 13,500 ft). It has an area of occupancy of 11 to 500 km^{2} (4.2 to 193.1 sq mi), with an extant of occurrence of 5,001 to 20,000 km^{2} (1,931 to 7,722 sq mi).

== Behavior and ecology ==
The Moupin pika is a diurnal species, but it can be active at night. It is colonial, terrestrial pika that is known to dig burrows. It is a generalist herbivore, and creates haypiles for food storage. The breeding season starts in at least April and continues till July. The female produces litters of one to five young. According to tests, the Moupin pika has been found to contain astroviruses.

== Status and conservation ==
Since 1996, the Moupin pika has been rated as a species of least concern on the IUCN Red List of Endangered Species. This is because it is a widespread species and its population is not known to be suffering a serious decline. Although its current population trend is unclear, it is common throughout its distribution. It experiences a threat from habitat destruction due to small-scale deforestation of bamboo and Rhododendron woodlands, and grazing by livestock. Due to destruction of habitat, the Sikkim pika may be endangered, but the other forms do not appear to be threatened according to IUCN. The Red List of China's Vertebrates also lists the Moupin pika as a species of least concern. It occurs in the protected areas of the Changshanerhai, Jiuzhaigou, Nujiang, Wanglang, Wawushan, Wolong, and Zhumulangmafeng Nature Reserves. However, deforestation may pose a threat throughout its range in southern China. It occurs extremely rarely in northeastern India. It has also been stated that almost all of its habitat in India has been destroyed, locally making it "critically endangered." It is targeted as a pest in southern Gansu.
