= The American Midland Naturalist =

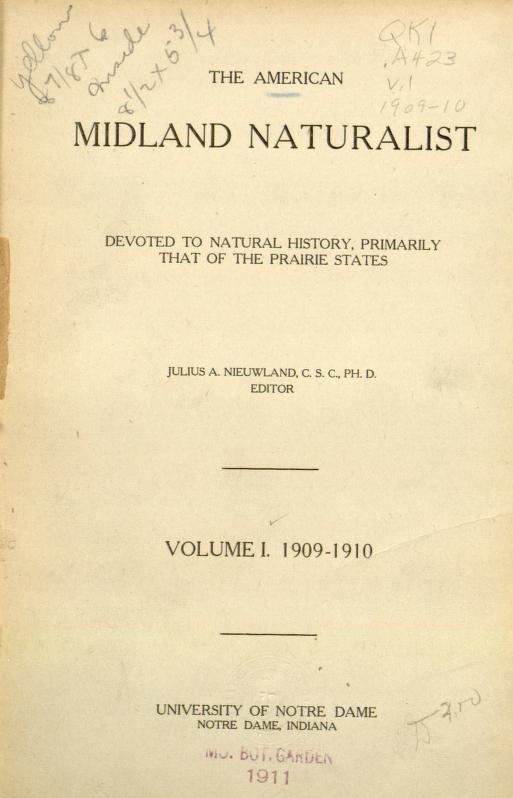
- Cover of 1st edition
- Discipline: Natural history
- Language: English
- Edited by: Hope Hollocher

Publication details
- Former name: Midland Naturalist
- History: 1909-2022
- Publisher: University of Notre Dame (United States)
- Frequency: Quarterly
- Impact factor: 0.621 (2013)

Standard abbreviations
- ISO 4: Am. Midl. Nat.

Indexing
- CODEN: AMNAAF
- ISSN: 0003-0031 (print); 1938-4238 (web)
- LCCN: 13003548
- JSTOR: 00030031
- OCLC no.: 5731039

Links
- Journal homepage; Online access at BioOne

The American Midland Naturalist was a quarterly peer-reviewed scientific journal covering natural history. It was established in 1909 by Julius Nieuwland and was published by the University of Notre Dame. According to the Journal Citation Reports, the journal had a 2013 impact factor of 0.621.
