= Wildlife of Ladakh =

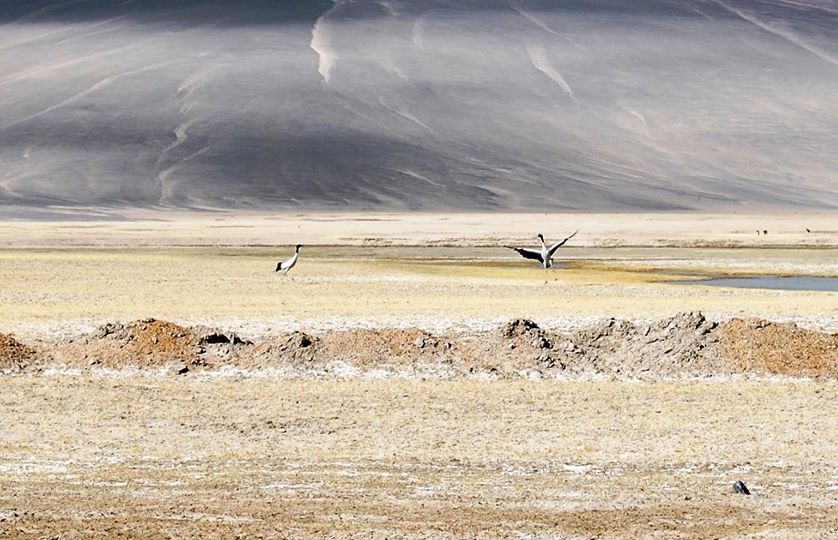
Courtship dance of the male black-necked crane before its female partner

Ladakh is the home to endemic Himalayan wildlife, such as the bharal, yak, Himalayan brown bear, Himalayan wolf and the iconic snow leopard. Hemis National Park, Changthang Cold Desert Wildlife Sanctuary, and Karakorum Wildlife Sanctuary are protected wildlife areas of Ladakh. The Mountain Institute, the Ladakh Ecological Development Group and the Snow Leopard Conservancy work on ecotourism in rural Ladakh. For such an elevated, arid area, Ladakh has great diversity of birds — 318 species have been recorded (including 30 species, in the 21st century, not seen since 1960). Many of these birds reside at or seasonally breed in high-altitude wetlands, such as Tso Moriri, or near rivers and water sources.

Due to its harsh montane environment, the mammals, reptiles and amphibians of Ladakh have much more in-common with the fauna of Central Asia and the Tibetan Plateau than with the species of the greater Indian subcontinent; one exception to this are the birds, many of which migrate seasonally from the warmer southern parts of India (and beyond), in an effort to escape the summer heat. Before winter's frosts first arrive in Ladakh, the birds that are not residents will, once again, embark on their journey south.

== History ==
The flora and fauna of Ladakh was first studied by Ferdinand Stoliczka, an Austrian–Czech palaeontologist, who carried out a massive research expedition in the 1870s.

== Birds ==
The black-necked crane, one of the most charismatic birds of Ladakh

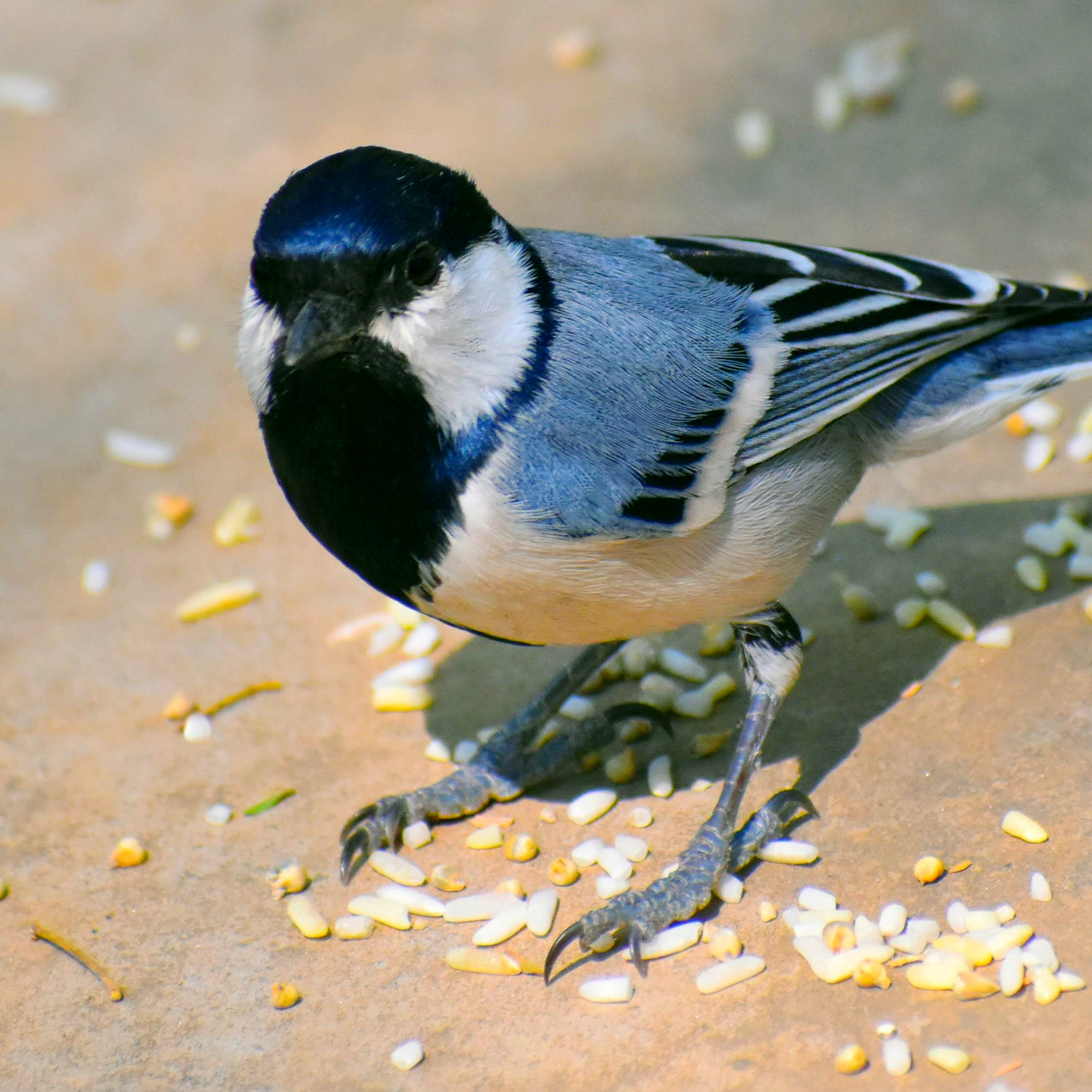
Starga bu (tit), A small tit in the Turtuk valley, often seen among walnut trees and along streamside habitats

Many species of finches, robins, redstarts (like the black redstart) and the hoopoe are common in summer. The brown-headed gull is seen in summer on the river Indus, and on some lakes of the Changthang. Resident water-birds include the brahminy duck also known as the ruddy sheldrake, and the bar-headed goose (Ladakhi: ngangpa). The black-necked crane (trhung-trhung) is a rare species found scattered in the Tibetan Plateau, and is also found nesting in summer in parts of Ladakh. Other birds include the raven, red-billed chough (chungka), Tibetan snowcock and chukar (a partridge, srakpa). The lammergeier and the golden eagle are common raptors here. The marshes of Ladakh are a breeding ground for many migratory birds.

Bird species recorded are:

- Snow partridge (Lerwa lerwa)
- Tibetan snowcock (Tetraogallus tibetanus)
- Himalayan snowcock (Tetraogallus himalayensis)
- Chukar partridge (Alectoris chukar)
- Tibetan partridge (Perdix hodgsoniae)
- Common quail (Coturnix coturnix)
- Rain quail (Coturnix coromandelica)
- Greylag goose (Anser anser)
- Bar-headed goose (Anser indicus)
- Brahminy shelduck (Tadorna ferruginea)
- Gadwall (Anas strepera)
- Eurasian wigeon (Anas penelope)
- Mallard (Anas platyrhynchos)
- Northern shoveller (Anas clypeata)
- Garganey (Anas querquedula)
- Common teal (Anas crecca)
- Red-crested pochard (Rhodonessa rufina)
- Common pochard (Aythya ferina)
- Ferruginous pochard (Aythya nyroca)
- Tufted pochard (Aythya fuligula)
- Common merganser (Mergus merganser)
- Eurasian wryneck (Jynx torquilla)
- Large scaly-bellied green woodpecker (Picus squamatus)
- Common hoopoe (Upupa epops)
- European roller (Coracias garrulus)
- Indian roller (Coracias benghalensis)
- Small blue kingfisher (Alcedo atthis)
- Blue-cheeked bee-eater (Merops persicus)
- European bee-eater (Merops apiaster)
- Pied crested cuckoo (Clamator jacobinus)
- Common cuckoo (Cuculus canorus)
- Asian koel (Eudynamys scolopacea)
- Alpine swift (Tachymarptis melba)
- Common swift (Apus apus)
- Pacific swift (Apus pacificus)
- House swift (Apus affinis)
- Pallid scops owl (Otus brucei)
- Eurasian eagle owl (Bubo bubo)
- Little owl (Athene noctua)
- Long-eared owl (Asio otus)
- Short-eared owl (Asio flammeus)
- European nightjar (Caprimulgus europaeus)
- Blue rock pigeon (Columba livia)
- Hill pigeon (Columba rupestris)
- Snow pigeon (Columba leuconota)
- Eastern stock pigeon (Columba eversmanni)
- European turtle dove (Streptopelia turtur)
- Oriental turtle dove (Streptopelia orientalis)
- Laughing dove (Spilopelia senegalensis)
- Spotted dove (Spilopelia chinensis)
- Red collared dove (Streptopelia tranquebarica)
- Eurasian collared dove (Streptopelia decaocto)
- Siberian crane (Grus leucogeranus)
- Demoiselle crane (Grus virgo)
- Black-necked crane (Grus nigricollis)
- Water rail (Rallus aquaticus)
- Corn crake (Crex crex)
- Baillon's crake (Porzana pusilla)
- Spotted crake (Porzana porzana)
- Common moorhen (Gallinula chloropus)
- Common coot (Fulica atra)
- Tibetan sandgrouse (Syrrhaptes tibetanus)
- Solitary snipe (Gallinago solitaria)
- Pintail snipe (Gallinago stenura)
- Common snipe (Gallinago gallinago)
- Black-tailed godwit (Limosa limosa)
- Whimbrel (Numenius phaeopus)
- Eurasian curlew (Numenius arquata)
- Common redshank (Tringa totanus)
- Marsh sandpiper (Tringa stagnatilis)
- Common greenshank (Tringa nebularia)
- Green sandpiper (Tringa ochropus)
- Wood sandpiper (Tringa glareola)
- Terek sandpiper (Xenus cinereus)
- Common sandpiper (Actitis hypoleucos)
- Little stint (Calidris minuta)
- Temminck's stint (Calidris temminckii)
- Dunlin (Calidris alpina)
- Ruddy turnstone (Arenaria interpres)
- Curlew sandpiper (Calidris ferruginea)
- Ruff (Philomachus pugnax)
- Red-necked phalarope (Phalaropus lobatus)
- Pheasant-tailed jacana (Hydrophasianus chirurgus)
- Ibisbill (Ibidorhyncha struthersii)
- Black-winged stilt (Himantopus himantopus)
- Pied avocet (Recurvirostra avosetta)
- Pacific golden plover (Pluvialis fulva)
- Grey plover (Pluvialis squatarola)
- Common ringed plover (Charadrius hiaticula)
- Little ringed plover (Charadrius dubius)
- Kentish plover (Charadrius alexandrinus)
- Lesser sand plover (Charadrius mongolus)
- Northern lapwing (Vanellus vanellus)
- Collared pratincole (Glareola pratincola)
- Parasitic jaeger (Stercorarius parasiticus)
- Pallas's gull (Larus ichthyaetus)
- Brown-headed gull (Larus brunnicephalus)
- Black-headed gull (Larus ridibundus)
- Little gull (Larus minutus)
- Gull-billed tern (Gelochelidon nilotica)
- Common tern (Sterna hirundo)
- Arctic tern (Sterna paradisaea)
- Little tern (Sterna albifrons)
- Whiskered tern (Chlidonias hybridus)
- White-winged black tern (Chlidonias leucopterus)
- Osprey (Pandion haliaetus)
- Oriental honey-buzzard (Pernis ptilorhynchus)
- Black-shouldered kite (Elanus caeruleus)
- Black kite (Milvus migrans)
- Pallas's fish-eagle (Haliaeetus leucoryphus)
- Bearded vulture (Gypaetus barbatus)
- Egyptian vulture (Neophron percnopterus)
- Himalayan griffon (Gyps himalayensis)
- Cinereous vulture (Aegypius monachus)
- Short-toed snake eagle (Circaetus gallicus)
- Western marsh harrier (Circus aeruginosus)
- Hen harrier (Circus cyaneus)
- Pallid harrier (Circus macrourus)
- Montagu's harrier (Circus pygargus)
- Eurasian sparrowhawk (Accipiter nisus)
- Northern goshawk (Accipiter gentilis)
- Long-legged buzzard (Buteo rufinus)
- Upland buzzard (Buteo hemilasius)
- Lesser spotted eagle (Clanga pomarina)
- Greater spotted eagle (Clanga clanga)
- Steppe eagle (Aquila nipalensis)
- Golden eagle (Aquila chrysaetos)
- Common kestrel (Falco tinnunculus)
- Merlin (Falco columbarius)
- Eurasian hobby (Falco subbuteo)
- Saker falcon (Falco cherrug)
- Peregrine falcon (Falco peregrinus)
- Little grebe (Tachybaptus ruficollis)
- Great crested grebe (Podiceps cristatus)
- Little egret (Egretta garzetta)
- Grey heron (Ardea cinerea)
- Cattle egret (Bubulcus ibis)
- Little bittern (Ixobrychus minutus)
- Great bittern (Botaurus stellaris)
- Rufous-backed shrike (Lanius schach)
- Southern grey shrike (Lanius meridionalis)
- Black-billed magpie (Pica pica)
- Hume's groundpecker (Pseudopodoces humilis)
- Red-billed chough (Pyrrhocorax pyrrhocorax)
- Yellow-billed chough (Pyrrhocorax graculus)
- Eurasian jackdaw (Corvus monedula)
- Carrion crow (Corvus corone)
- Common raven (Corvus corax)
- Black drongo (Dicrurus macrocercus)
- White-throated dipper (Cinclus cinclus)
- Brown dipper (Cinclus pallasii)
- Rufous-tailed rock thrush (Monticola saxatilis)
- Blue whistling thrush (Myiophonus caeruleus)
- Eurasian blackbird (Turdus merula)
- Dark-throated thrush (Turdus ruficollis)
- Dusky thrush (Turdus naumanni)
- Sooty flycatcher (Muscicapa sibirica)
- Asian brown flycatcher (Muscicapa dauurica)
- Rusty-tailed flycatcher (Muscicapa ruficauda)
- Red-throated flycatcher (Ficedula parva)
- Himalayan rubythroat (Luscinia pectoralis)
- Bluethroat (Luscinia svecica)
- Rufous-tailed scrub robin (Cercotrichas galactotes)
- Eversmann's redstart (Phoenicurus erythronotus)
- Blue-capped redstart (Phoenicurus caeruleocephalus)
- Guldenstadt's redstart (Phoenicurus erythrogaster)
- Blue-fronted redstart (Phoenicurus frontalis)
- White-capped redstart (Chaimarrornis leucocephalus)
- Little forktail (Enicurus scouleri)
- Hume's wheatear (Oenanthe alboniger)
- Variable wheatear (Oenanthe picata)
- Pied wheatear (Oenanthe pleschanka)
- Desert wheatear (Oenanthe deserti)
- Isabelline wheatear (Oenanthe isabellina)
- Brahminy starling (Sturnus pagodarum)
- Rosy starling (Sturnus roseus)
- Wallcreeper (Tichodroma muraria)
- Bar-tailed treecreeper (Certhia himalayana)
- Winter wren (Troglodytes troglodytes)
- Eurasian penduline tit (Remiz pendulinus)
- Fire-capped tit (Cephalopyrus flammiceps)
- Simla crested tit (Parus rufonuchalis)
- Cinereous tit (Parus cinereus)
- Green-backed tit (Parus monticolus)
- Yellow-browed tit (Sylviparus modestus)
- Plain martin (Riparia paludicola)
- Eurasian crag martin (Hirundo rupestris)
- Common swallow (Hirundo rustica)
- Red-rumped swallow (Hirundo daurica)
- Northern house martin (Delichon urbica)
- Goldcrest (Regulus regulus)
- Stoliczka's tit-warbler (Leptopoecile sophiae)
- Common chiffchaff (Phylloscopus collybita)
- Mountain chiffchaff (Phylloscopus sindianus)
- Plain leaf-warbler (Phylloscopus neglectus)
- Tickell's leaf warbler (Phylloscopus affinis)
- Greenish leaf warbler (Phylloscopus trochiloides)
- Large-billed leaf-warbler (Phylloscopus magnirostris)
- Tytler's leaf-warbler (Phylloscopus tytleri)
- Streaked laughingthrush (Garrulax lineatus)
- Variegated laughingthrush (Garrulax variegatus)
- Garden warbler (Sylvia borin)
- Greater whitethroat (Sylvia communis)
- Eastern calandra-lark (Melanocorypha bimaculata)
- Long-billed calandra-lark (Melanocorypha maxima)
- Greater short-toed lark (Calandrella brachydactyla)
- Hume's short-toed lark (Calandrella acutirostris)
- Asian short-toed lark (Alaudala cheleensis)
- Horned lark (Eremophila alpestris)
- House sparrow (Passer domesticus)
- Spanish sparrow (Passer hispaniolensis)
- Tibetan snowfinch (Montifringilla adamsi)
- Mandelli's snowfinch (Pyrgilauda taczanowskii)
- Plain-backed snowfinch (Pyrgilauda blanfordi)
- Forest wagtail (Dendronanthus indicus)
- White wagtail (Motacilla alba)
- Large pied wagtail (Motacilla maderaspatensis)
- Yellow wagtail (Motacilla flava)
- Grey wagtail (Motacilla cinerea)
- Red-throated pipit (Anthus cervinus)
- Rosy pipit (Anthus roseatus)
- Alpine accentor (Prunella collaris)
- Altai accentor (Prunella himalayana)
- Robin accentor (Prunella rubeculoides)
- Siberian accentor (Prunella montanella)
- Brown accentor (Prunella fulvescens)
- Black-throated accentor (Prunella atrogularis)
- Brambling (Fringilla montifringilla)
- Fire-fronted serin (Serinus pusillus)
- Twite (Carduelis flavirostris)
- Eurasian linnet (Carduelis cannabina)
- Hodgson's mountain finch (Leucosticte nemoricola)
- Black-headed mountain finch (Leucosticte brandti)
- Black-headed mountain finch (Leucosticte brandti)
- Crimson-winged finch (Rhodopechys sanguinea)
- Mongolian finch (Bucanetes mongolicus)
- Common rosefinch (Carpodacus erythrinus)
- White-browed rosefinch (Carpodacus thura)
- Red-mantled rosefinch (Carpodacus rhodochlamys)
- Streaked great rosefinch (Carpodacus rubicilloides)
- Common great rosefinch (Carpodacus rubicilla)
- Red-fronted rosefinch (Carpodacus puniceus)
- Pine bunting (Emberiza leucocephalus)
- Rock bunting (Emberiza cia)
- Grey-necked bunting (Emberiza buchanani)
- Ortolan bunting (Emberiza hortulana)
- Little bunting (Emberiza pusilla)
- Chestnut bunting (Emberiza rutila)
- Red-headed bunting (Emberiza bruniceps)
- Reed bunting (Emberiza schoeniclus)
- Hoopoe (Upupa epops)

== Mammals ==
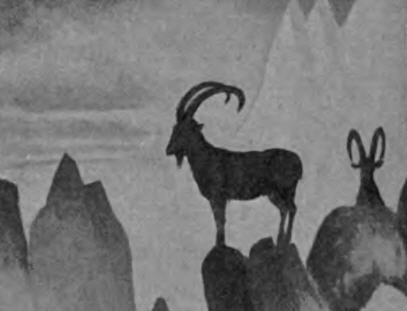
Ibex

The Siberian ibex (skin), also known as the Himalayan ibex, is a species of wild goat found in the high, craggy terrain of Ladakh, one of the snow leopard's top prey choices. Several thousand are believed to inhabit the mountains of Ladakh. The bharal, or "blue sheep" (napo), is even more common than the ibex, ranging across the Himalayas from Pakistan's east as far as Sikkim and Bhutan. The bharal is the basis of the snow leopard's diet. The Ladakhi urial (shapo), another wild sheep, is a rarer subspecies of urial found at lower elevations, mostly in river valleys; thus, it is often directly in-competition with domesticated grazing animals. They are now rare, numbering about a thousand in the region. The Tibetan argali (nyan) is a relative of the Marco Polo sheep of the Pamirs. Impressive animals with huge horizontal curving horns, they are extremely rare in Ladakh, numbering only a few hundred, but they do have a wide range throughout mountainous areas of the Chinese provinces of Xinjiang, Qinghai, and Gansu. The habitat of the extremely rare Tibetan gazelle (gowa) is near the Tibetan border in southeastern Ladakh. The Himalayan musk deer (lhawa) is extremely elusive, and has not been seen in Ladakh for decades, if not generations.

The Tibetan antelope (tsos, Indian English chiru) is also endangered. Early in the 20th century the chiru was seen in herds of thousands, surviving on remarkably sparse vegetation, but they are vanishingly rare now. It has been hunted for its fine under-wool (Urdu: shahtoosh, tsoskul), which must be pulled out by hand, a process done after the animal is killed. This shahtoosh is valued in South Asia for its light weight and warmth, but more than anything else, as a status symbol. Owning or trading in shahtoosh is now illegal in most countries.

The Tibetan wild ass (kiang) is one animal that visitors can expect to see, if they take a wildlife tour on the Changthang. Favouring the rolling grasslands of this area, their natural curiosity makes them fairly easy to spot, despite their relatively low numbers, about 1500 individuals.

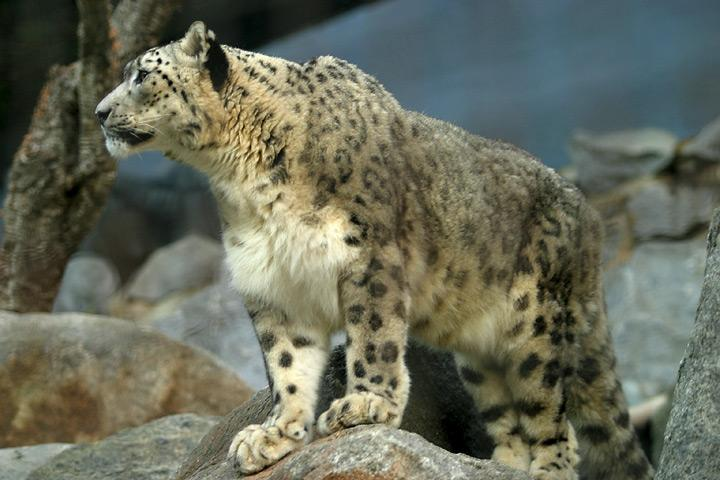
About 200 snow leopards, an endangered species, are believed to live in Ladakh.

The snow leopard (shan) once ranged throughout the Himalayas, Tibet, and as far as the Sayan Mountains on the Mongolian-Russian border, at elevations of 1800 m to 5400 m. They are extremely shy and hard to spot, and as such, not well-studied, though this has changed in the 21st century somewhat. It is believed that there are about 200 in Ladakh. While tourists are unlikely to see leopards themselves, during winter, footprints and other identifiers are not uncommon. Other cats in Ladakh are even rarer than the snow leopard: the Siberian lynx (ee), numbering only a few individuals, and the Pallas's cat, which looks somewhat like a house cat. The Tibetan wolf (shangku) is the greatest threat to the livestock of the Ladakhis and as such is the most persecuted. There are only about 300 wolves left in Ladakh. There are also a very few brown bears (drenmo / tret) in the Suru valley and the area around Dras. The red fox is common, and Tibetan sand fox has recently been discovered in this region (both: watse).

Among smaller animals, marmots (pheya) are common; you can even sometimes see them from the road, although they do not look very different from the marmots common to other mountainous areas of the world. There are also plenty of hares (ribong), and several types of voles and pika (both: rdzabra / zabra).

Mammal species recorded by Otto Pfister are:

- Snow leopard (Uncia uncia)
- Lynx (Lynx lynx)
- Pallas's cat (Otocolobus manul)
- Wolf (Canis lupus)
- Red fox (Vulpes vulpes)
- Tibetan sand fox (Vulpes ferrilata)
- Dhole (Cuon alpinus)
- Brown bear (Ursus arctos)
- Stoat (Mustela erminea)
- Mountain weasel (Mustela altaica)
- Stone marten (Martes foina)
- Eurasian otter (Lutra lutra)
- Kiang (Equus kiang)
- Musk deer (Moschus chrysogaster)
- Yak (Bos grunniens)
- Tibetan gazelle (Procapra picticaudata)
- Tibetan antelope/Chiru (Pantholops hodgsoni)
- Bharal (Pseudois nayaur)
- Ibex (Capra ibex)
- Tibetan argali (Ovis ammon hodgsoni)
- Ladakh urial (Ovis vignei)
- Himalayan marmot (Marmota bobak)
- Long tailed marmot (Marmota caudata)
- Silvery mountain vole (Alticola argentatus)
- Royle's mountain vole (Alticola stoliczkanus)
- Cape hare (Lepus capensis)
- Wooly hare (Lepus oiostolus)
- Plateau pika (Ochotona curzoniae)
- Ladakh pika (Ochotona ladacensis)
- Nubra pika (Ochotona nubrica)
- Large-eared pika (Ochotona macrotis)
- Royle's pika (Ochotona roylei)

== See also ==
- Geography of Ladakh
- Ecotourism in Ladakh
- Tourism in Ladakh
- Transport in Ladakh
