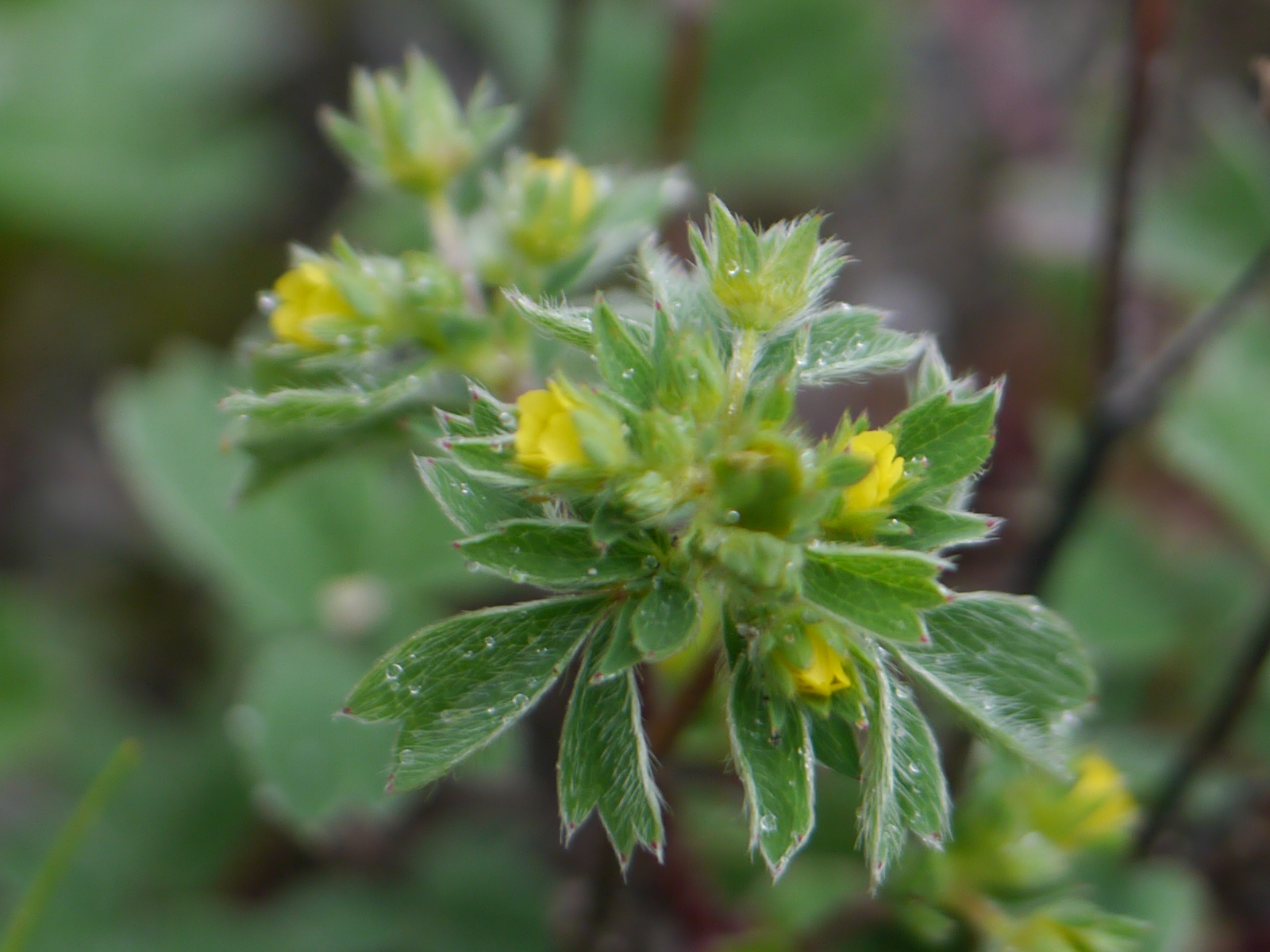

Scientific classification
- Kingdom: Plantae
- Clade: Tracheophytes
- Clade: Angiosperms
- Clade: Eudicots
- Clade: Rosids
- Order: Rosales
- Family: Rosaceae
- Genus: Sibbaldia
- Species: S. parviflora

Binomial name
- Sibbaldia parviflora Willd.

Synonyms
- Potentilla cuneata Wall. ex Lehm.; Potentilla sibbaldii Hook.f.; Sibbaldia parviflora var. minor Boiss.; Sibbaldia parviflora var. semiglabra (Willd.) Trautv.; Sibbaldia parvifolia Willd.; Sibbaldia procumbens M.Bieb. (non L.); Sibbaldia procumbens subsp. parviflora (Willd.) Kamelin; Sibbaldia procumbens var. orientalis Sommier & Levier; Sibbaldia procumbens var. pilosior Trautv.; Sibbaldia semiglabra C.A.Mey.

= Sibbaldia parviflora =

Species of flowering plant

Sibbaldia parviflora is a species of flowering plant in the genus Sibbaldia of the family Rosaceae, native to Southeast Europe and West Asia. It is a herbaceous perennial plant growing in damp rocky places on alpine meadows.

There have been different views on its taxonomic status. Though commonly accepted as a species, it has been placed by some as a subspecies or a variety of Sibbaldia procumbens (a species found in arctic and alpine regions throughout the Northern Hemisphere). The related Sibbaldia cuneata of the Himalayas and China has been variously treated as either a distinct species, or subsumed under Sibbaldia parviflora.

It is distinguished from the similar Sibbaldia procumbens by the veins on the petals, which take on an anastomosing character towards the apex.

The plant is found in scattered areas in the mountains of northern Iran, northern Iraq, Turkey, the Caucasus, and also on the Balkan peninsula: in northern Greece (at elevations of 2300–2400 m at mount Kajmakčalan in Voras/Nidže, and Kiafa in northern Pindus), North Macedonia (the mountain of Galičica), Albania (Gramos and Ostrovicë mountains) and Bulgaria (Osogovo).
