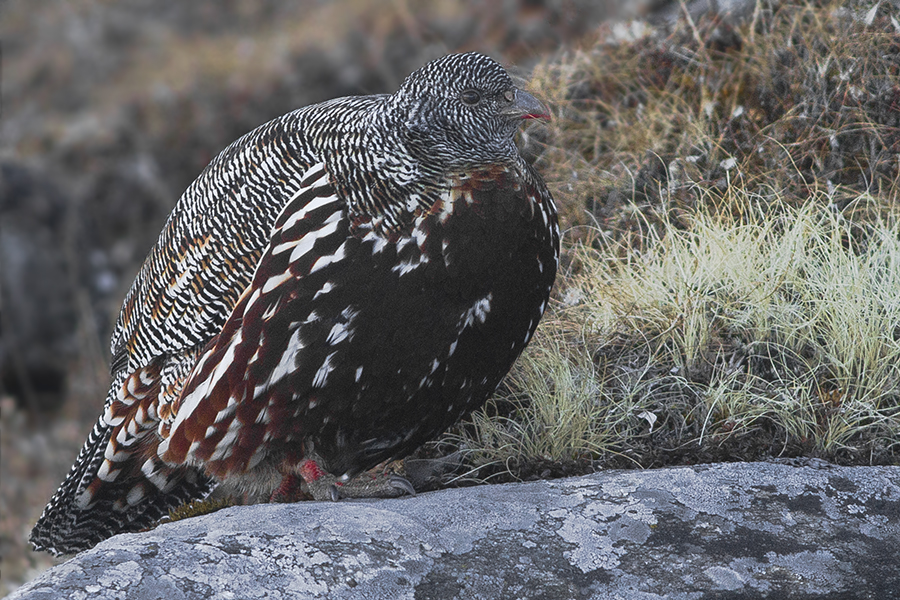
- Snow Partridge from Kedarnath Wildlife Sanctuary

Conservation status
- Least Concern (IUCN 3.1)

Scientific classification
- Kingdom: Animalia
- Phylum: Chordata
- Class: Aves
- Order: Galliformes
- Family: Phasianidae
- Subfamily: Phasianinae
- Genus: Lerwa; Hodgson, 1837
- Species: L. lerwa

Binomial name
- Lerwa lerwa (Hodgson, 1833)

Synonyms
- Lerwa nivicola Perdix lerwa protonym

= Snow partridge =

Species of bird

The snow partridge (Lerwa lerwa) is a gamebird in the pheasant family Phasianidae found widely distributed across the high-altitude Himalayan regions of Pakistan, China, India and Nepal. It is the only species within its genus, and is thought to be the most basal member of the "erectile clade" of the subfamily Phasianinae. The species is found in alpine pastures and open hillside above the treeline but not in as bare rocky terrain as the Himalayan snowcock and is not as wary as that species. Males and females look similar in plumage but males have a spur on their tarsus.

== Description ==
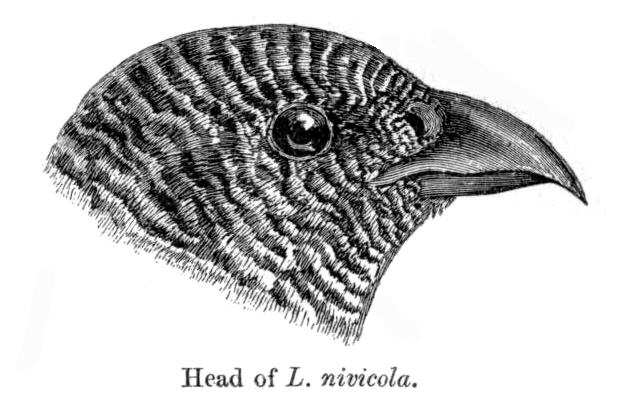
Head showing barring and curved beak

This partridge appears grey above and chestnut below with bright red bill and legs and the upperparts finely barred in black and white. In flight the pattern of dark brown primaries and secondaries with a narrow trailing white margin make them somewhat like the much larger Tibetan snowcock. The 14-feathered tail is dark and barred in white. There is variation in the shade and some birds have a nearly black crown. The primaries and secondaries are brown and the breast is deep chestnut. The abdomen has more white and the lower flanks and feathers around the vent are barred brown and white. The under-tail coverts are chestnut with black shaft streaks and white tips. Young birds have the lower parts mottled and the barring less distinct. The tarsus is feathered on the front of the leg half-way to the toes.

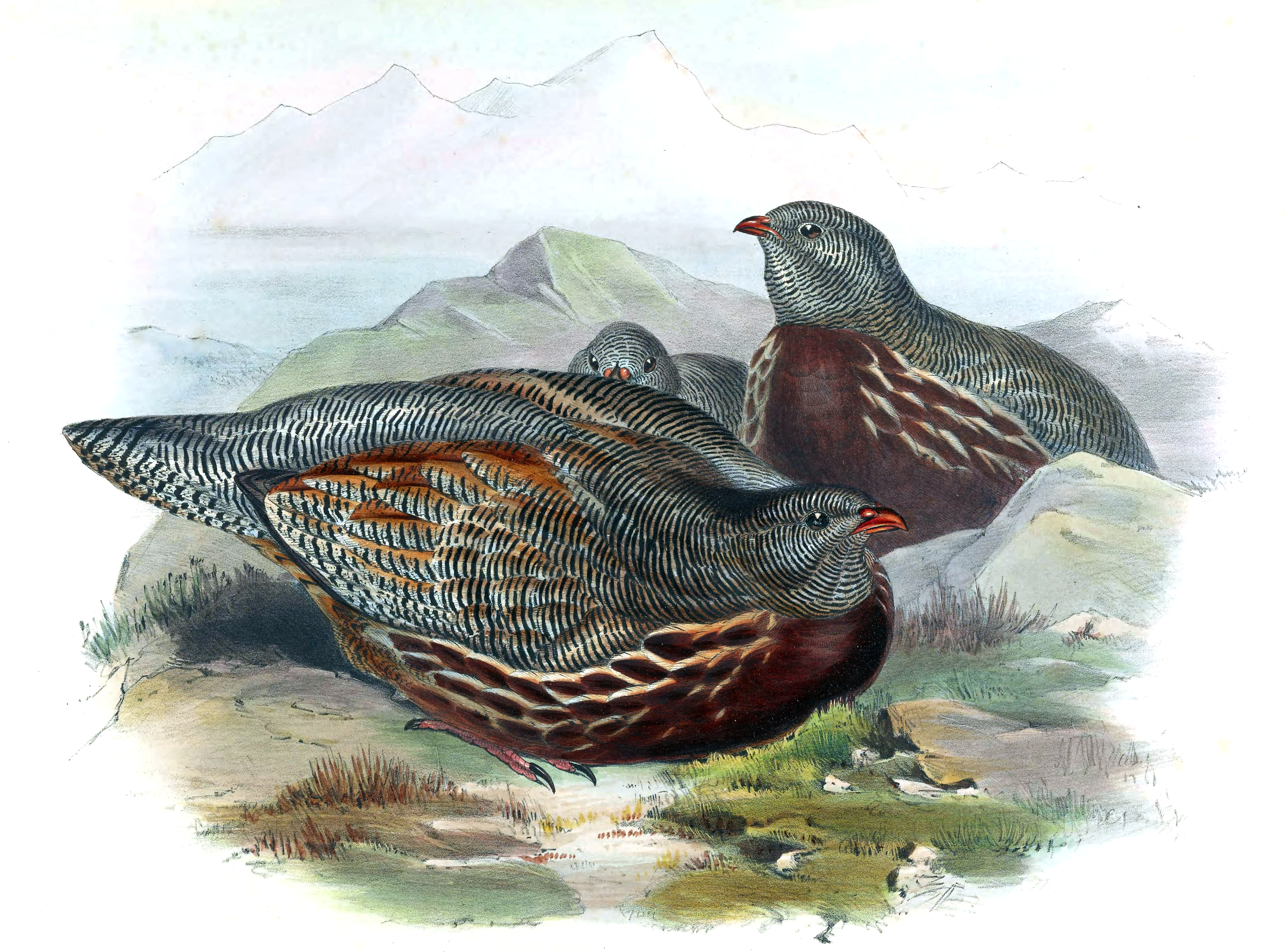
Illustration by John Gould

It measures 38–40 cm in length. Females weigh 450–580 g; males, 550–700 g. Sexes are similar in plumage, female lacks spurs on the tarsus while the male has a blunt spur and sometimes a second incipient spur. Downy chicks have a resemblance to the chicks of the blood pheasant. Chicks are born with the tarsi feathered and the nostril opening is covered by feathers.

== Taxonomy and systematics ==
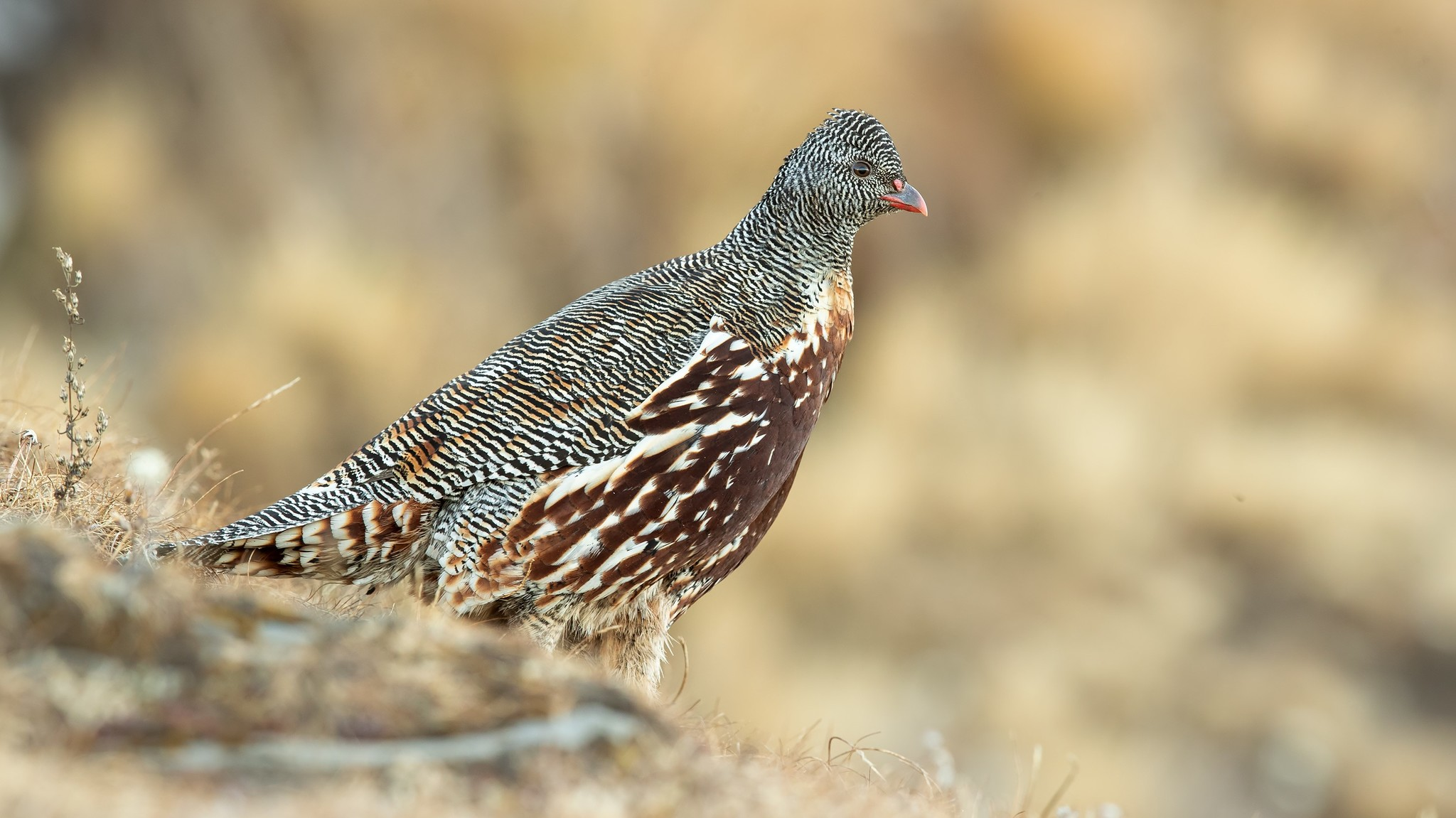

This species was first described by Brian Houghton Hodgson in 1833 and given the genus name Lerwa based on the Bhutia name for it in Nepal. Hodgson initially placed it in the genus Perdix calling it Perdix lerwa. A subspecies, L. l. major was described by Richard Meinertzhagen from Sichuan while L. l. callipygia from south Kansu was noted by Stegmann in 1938, but these are not usually recognized. The species has been retained in this monotypic genus due to various peculiarities including the tarsus feathering and the lack of clear sexual dimorphism in plumage. A species of bird louse, Chelopistes lervicola has been described as an ectoparasite of this species, and other species in this louse genus are known to parasitize the Cracidae, Meleagrididae and Odontophorinae of the New World.

== Distribution and status ==
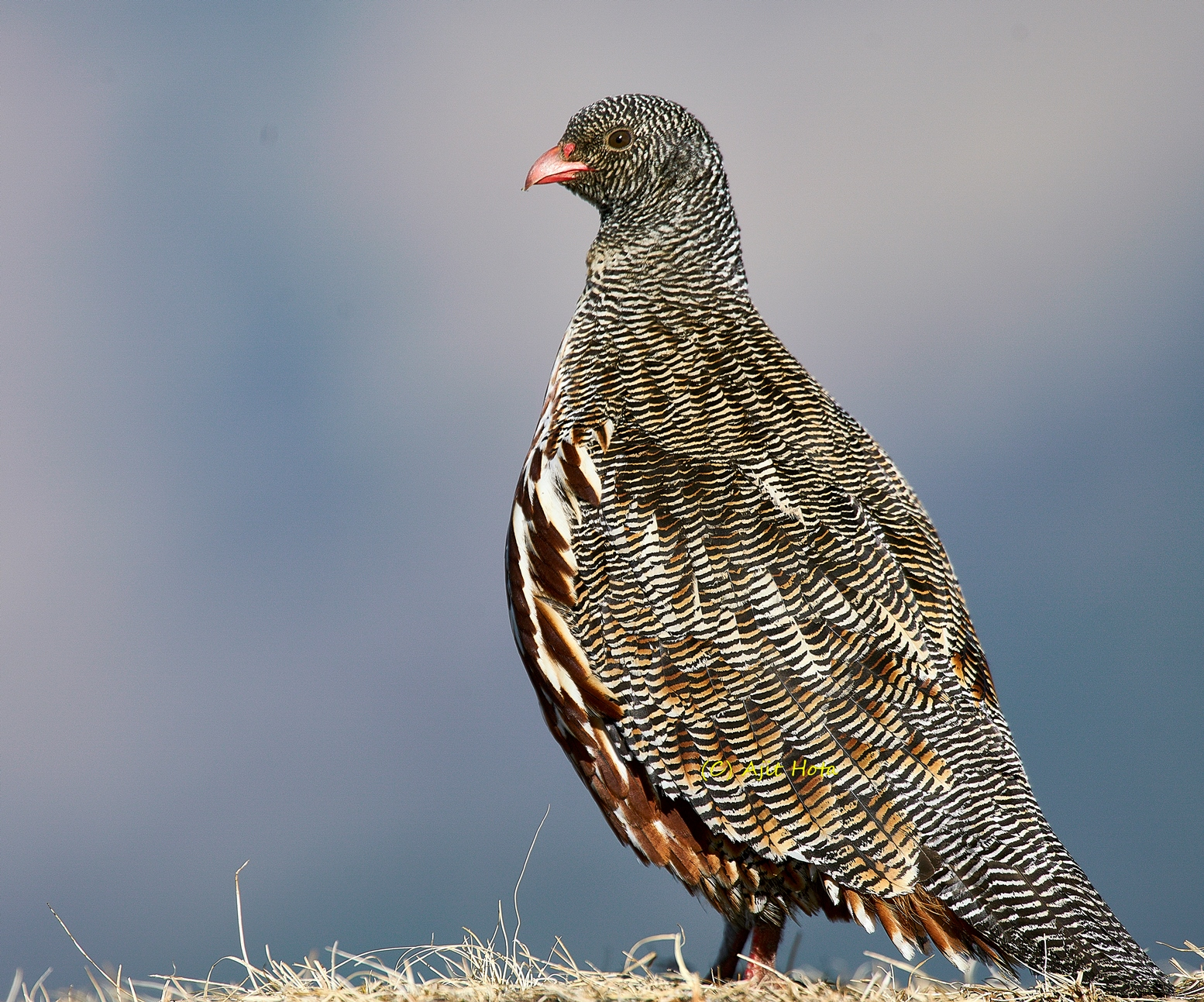

Snow partridge is found in the Himalayas from Pakistan to Arunachal Pradesh along the higher ranges, mainly 3000 to 5000 m (rarely below 2000 m) altitude. It is found above the tree line but not on as bare and stony terrain as the snowcocks. Although said to be found in Afghanistan, there is no evidence. The species is found over a large area is generally considered to be of low conservation concern. It is hunted to some extent, due to its habit of being more approachable than snowcock and has declined in population in some areas.

The usual habitat is alpine pastures, open grassy hillsides with grass, lichens, moss, ferns and rhododendrons. Is found among small snow-patches but not in as stony or bare ground as the snowcock. The birds however are very local in their distribution.

== Behaviour and ecology ==
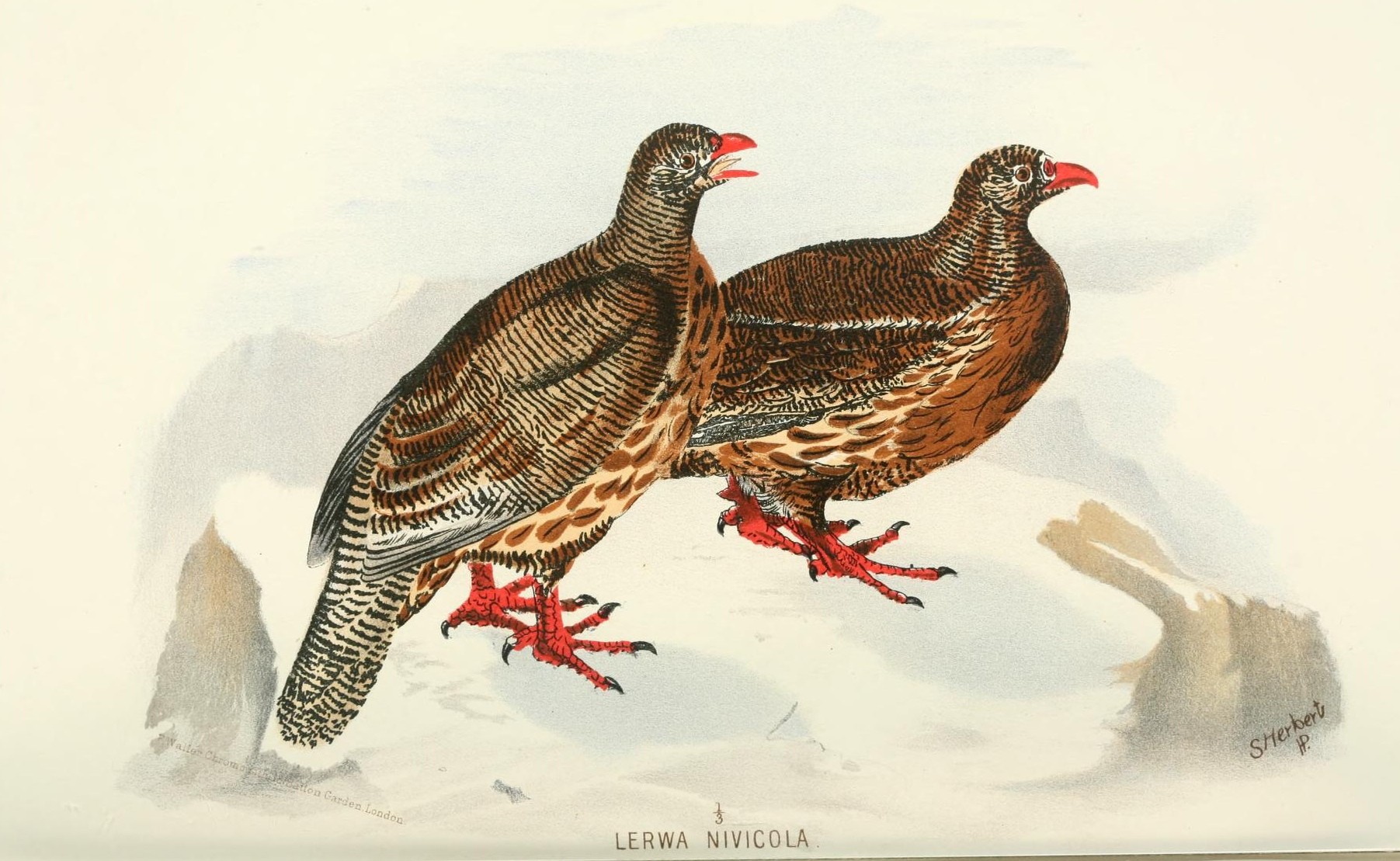
Illustration from Hume and Marshall's Game birds of India (1890)

The snow partridge is found is small groups, usually about 6 to 8 but up to 30 during the non-breeding season. When flushed, they usually fly up before scattering away with noisy wing beats. The flight is rapid and stirring. It has a habit of sunning itself on rocks during the midday. The call in the breeding season is said to resemble that of the grey francolin of the plains. It has been compared in habit to that of the ptarmigan. It is said to feed on mosses, lichens, berries, and the shoots of plants. It also swallows grit to aid digestion.

The breeding season is May to July. The males are believed to be monogynous. The nest is a scrape on a hill-side under some sheltering rock, either scratched out by themselves or already available, and usually hidden with vegetation. The nest is sometimes lined with moss but well concealed although given away by the male. About 3 to 5 eggs, pale yellow in color and slightly glossy with reddish-brown markings on the rounded end, are laid, and the female incubates while the male stands sentinel. Parent birds may use distraction displays to draw the attention of predators. They call in a comparatively softer lower note to the young, which respond with chicken-like cheep calls.

Apart from Chelopistes lervicola described as an ectoparasite of this species, an Argasid tick Argas himalayensis has been noted.
