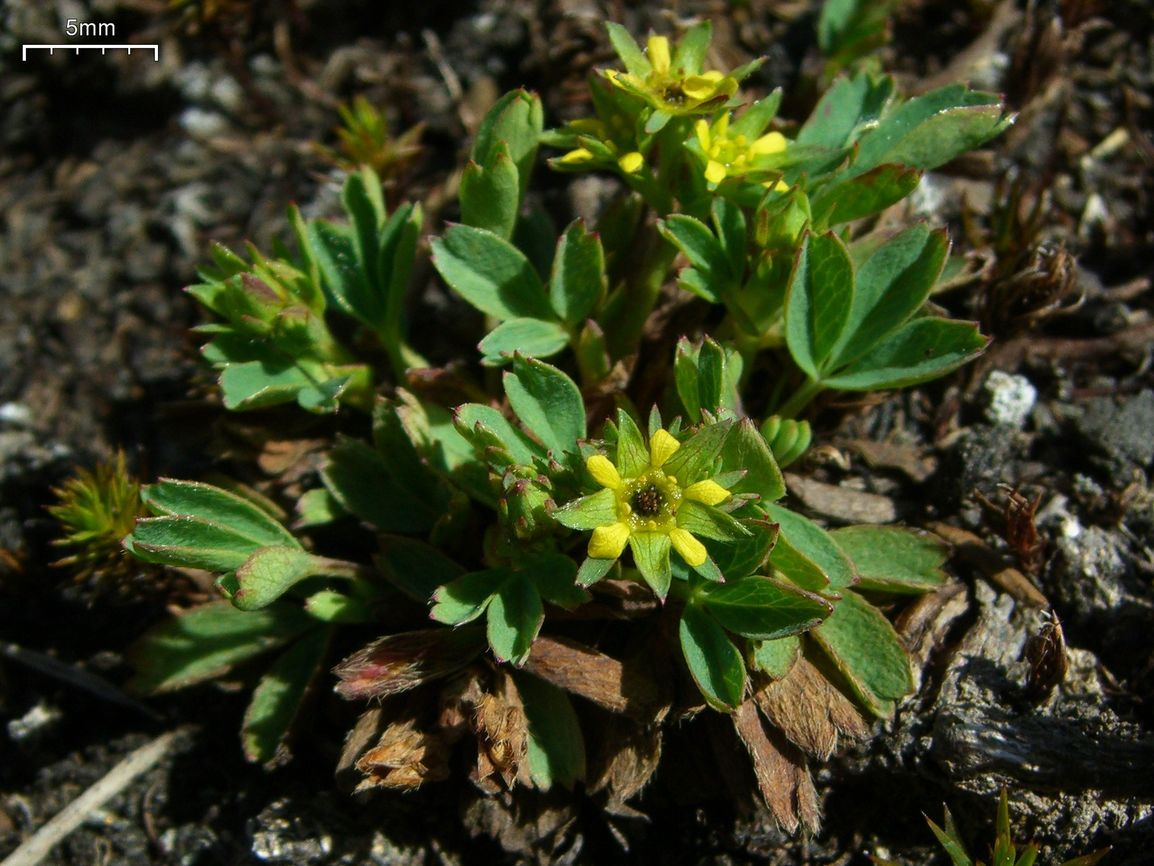
- Sibbaldia procumbens

Scientific classification
- Kingdom: Plantae
- Clade: Tracheophytes
- Clade: Angiosperms
- Clade: Eudicots
- Clade: Rosids
- Order: Rosales
- Family: Rosaceae
- Subtribe: Fragariinae
- Genus: Sibbaldia; L.

Species
- See text

Synonyms
- Dactylophyllum Spenn.; Dryadanthe Endl.; Sibaldia L.; Sibbalda St.-Lag.; Sibbaldiopsis Rydb.

= Sibbaldia =

Genus of Rosaceae plants

Sibbaldia is a genus of flowering plants of the family Rosaceae, with a circumpolar distribution, including the high Arctic. The type species is Sibbaldia procumbens. It is also in the Rosoideae subfamily.

The genus name of Sibbaldia is in honour of Robert Sibbald (1641–1722), a Scottish physician and antiquary. It was first described in 1753.

== Range ==
Its native range is the temperate Northern Hemisphere. It is found in Europe; (within Albania, Austria, Bulgaria, Corsica, East European Russia, Faroe Islands, Finland, France, Germany, Great Britain, Greece, Greenland, Iceland, Italy, North European Russia, Norway, Poland, Spain, Svalbard, Sweden, Switzerland and Yugoslavia). In Asia; within Siberia (in Altai), the Russian Far East (within Amur, Kamchatka, Khabarovsk, Magadan, Primorye and Sakhalin), central Asia (within Kazakhstan, Kyrgyzstan and Tajikistan,) the Caucasus (North Caucasus and Transcaucasus), western Asia (Afghanistan, Iran and Iraq and Turkey), China (within Manchuria, north-central, Qinghai, south-central, Tibet and Xinjiang), Mongolia, eastern Asia (Japan, Korea and Taiwan), tropical Asia (the East Himalaya, Nepal, Pakistan and the West Himalaya). In America; Canada; (within the provinces of Alberta, Labrador, Newfoundland, Northwest Territorie, Nunavut, Nova Scotia, Prince Edward Island, Québec, Saskatchewan, and Yukon) and America; (within the states of Alaska, Arizona, British Columbia, California, Colorado, Connecticut, Georgia, Idaho, Illinois, Iowa, Maine, Maryland, Massachusetts, Michigan, Minnesota, Montana, Nevada, New Hampshire, New Jersey, New Mexico, New York, North Carolina, North Dakota, Ontario, Oregon, Pennsylvania, Rhode Island, Tennessee, Utah, Vermont, Virginia, Washington, West Virginia, Wisconsin and Wyoming) and also in Mexico.

== Species ==
Morphological and genetic studies showed that Sibbaldia as then circumscribed was polyphyletic, with some species needing synonymizing or reassignment to (or from) other genera, including Sibbaldianthe, Chamaecallis, and Potentilla. As of January 2024, Plants of the World Online accepted the following species:

- Sibbaldia aphanopetala Hand.-Mazz.
- Sibbaldia compacta (W.W.Sm. & Cave) Dikshit & Panigrahi
- Sibbaldia cuneata Edgew.
- Sibbaldia cuneifolia (Bertol.) Paule & Soják
- Sibbaldia macrophylla Turcz. ex Murav.
- Sibbaldia miyabei (Makino) Paule & Soják
- Sibbaldia olgae Juz. & Ovcz.
- Sibbaldia parviflora Willd.
- Sibbaldia perpusilla (Hook.f.) Chatterjee
- Sibbaldia procumbens L.
- Sibbaldia semiglabra C.A.Mey.
- Sibbaldia tridentata (Aiton) Paule & Soják
- Sibbaldia trullifolia (Hook.f.) Chatterjee

=== Former species ===
Formerly accepted species include:

- Sibbaldia adpressa Bunge → Sibbaldianthe adpressa (Bunge) Juz.
- Sibbaldia micropetala (D.Don) Hand.-Mazz. → Potentilla micropetala D.Don
- Sibbaldia omeiensis T.T.Yu & C.L.Li → Potentilla omeiensis (T.T.Yü and C.L.Li) Soják
- Sibbaldia pentaphylla J.Krause → Potentilla clandestina Soják
- Sibbaldia perpusilloides (W.W.Sm.) Hand.-Mazz. → Chamaecallis perpusillodes (W.W.Sm.) Smedmark
- Sibbaldia phanerophlebia T.T.Yu & C.L.Li → probably P. micropetala
- Sibbaldia purpurea Royle → Potentilla purpurea (Royle) Hook. f.
- Sibbaldia sericea (Grubov) Soják → Sibbaldianthe sericea Grubov
- Sibbaldia sikkimensis (Prain) Chatterjee → Potentilla sikkimensis Prain
- Sibbaldia tenuis Hand.-Mazz. → Potentilla tenuis (Hand.-Mazz.) Soják
- Sibbaldia tetrandra Bunge → Potentilla tetrandra (Hook.f.) Bunge
