= Robert Sibbald =

Scottish physician and antiquary (1641–1722)

Sir Robert Sibbald
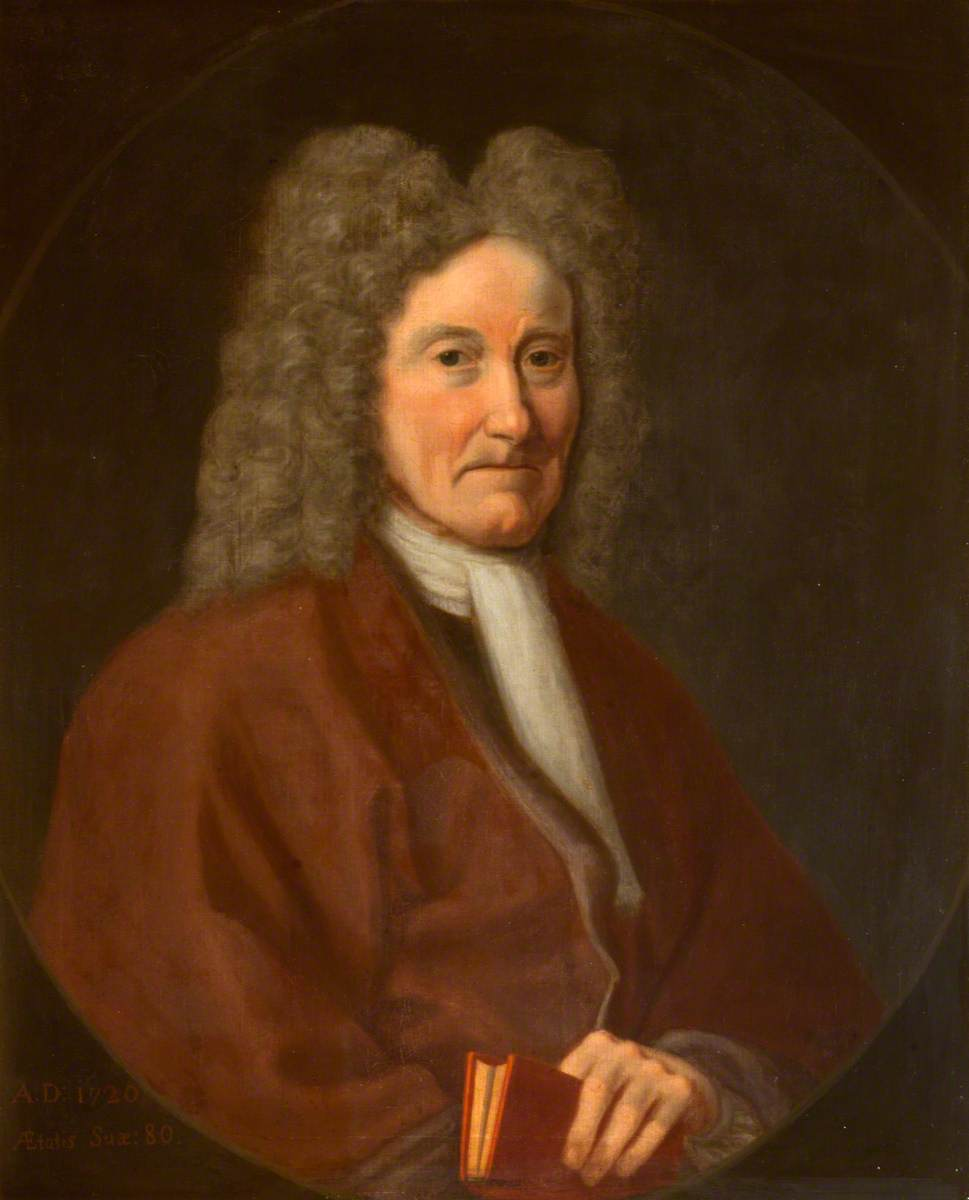
- Portrait by John Alexander, 1700
- Born: 15 April 1641; Edinburgh, Scotland
- Died: August 1722 (aged 81)
- Education: Royal High School, Edinburgh; University of Angers
- Known for: President and founder of Royal College of Physicians of Edinburgh, Founder of Royal Botanic Garden Edinburgh; First Professor of Medicine at Edinburgh University
- Medical career
- Profession: physician, antiquary, geographer
- Institutions: President, Royal College of Physicians of Edinburgh (1684), Edinburgh; Professor of Medicine, Edinburgh University (1685)
- Sub-specialties: botanic medicine
- Research: botany, medicine

Sir Robert Sibbald (15 April 1641 – August 1722) was a Scottish physician and antiquary.

== Life ==
He was born in Edinburgh, the son of David Sibbald (brother of Sir James Sibbald) and Margaret Boyd (January 1606 – 10 July 1672). Educated at the Royal High School and the Universities of Edinburgh, Leiden, and Paris, he took his doctor's degree at the University of Angers in 1662, and soon afterwards settled as a physician working in Edinburgh. He resided at "Kipps Castle" near Linlithgow. In 1667 with Sir Andrew Balfour he started the botanical garden in Edinburgh, and he took a leading part in establishing the Royal College of Physicians of Edinburgh, of which he was elected president in 1684. Both Sibbald and Balfour were proponents of the Edinburgh Pharmacopoeia.

In 1682, Sibbald began assembling material for a projected two volume geographical description or atlas of Scotland, recruiting parish ministers and members of the nobility and gentry to assist him in the task. While the work was never published, many of the manuscripts describing aspects of the geography, natural history and antiquities of parts of Scotland have survived.

In 1685 he was appointed the first professor of medicine at the University of Edinburgh. He was knighted, named Physician to the King, and appointed Geographer Royal in 1682.

His numerous and miscellaneous writings deal with historical and antiquarian as well as with botanical and medical subjects. He based many of his cartographical studies on the work of Timothy Pont.

He is buried in Greyfriars Kirkyard in Edinburgh in a vault against the southern wall.

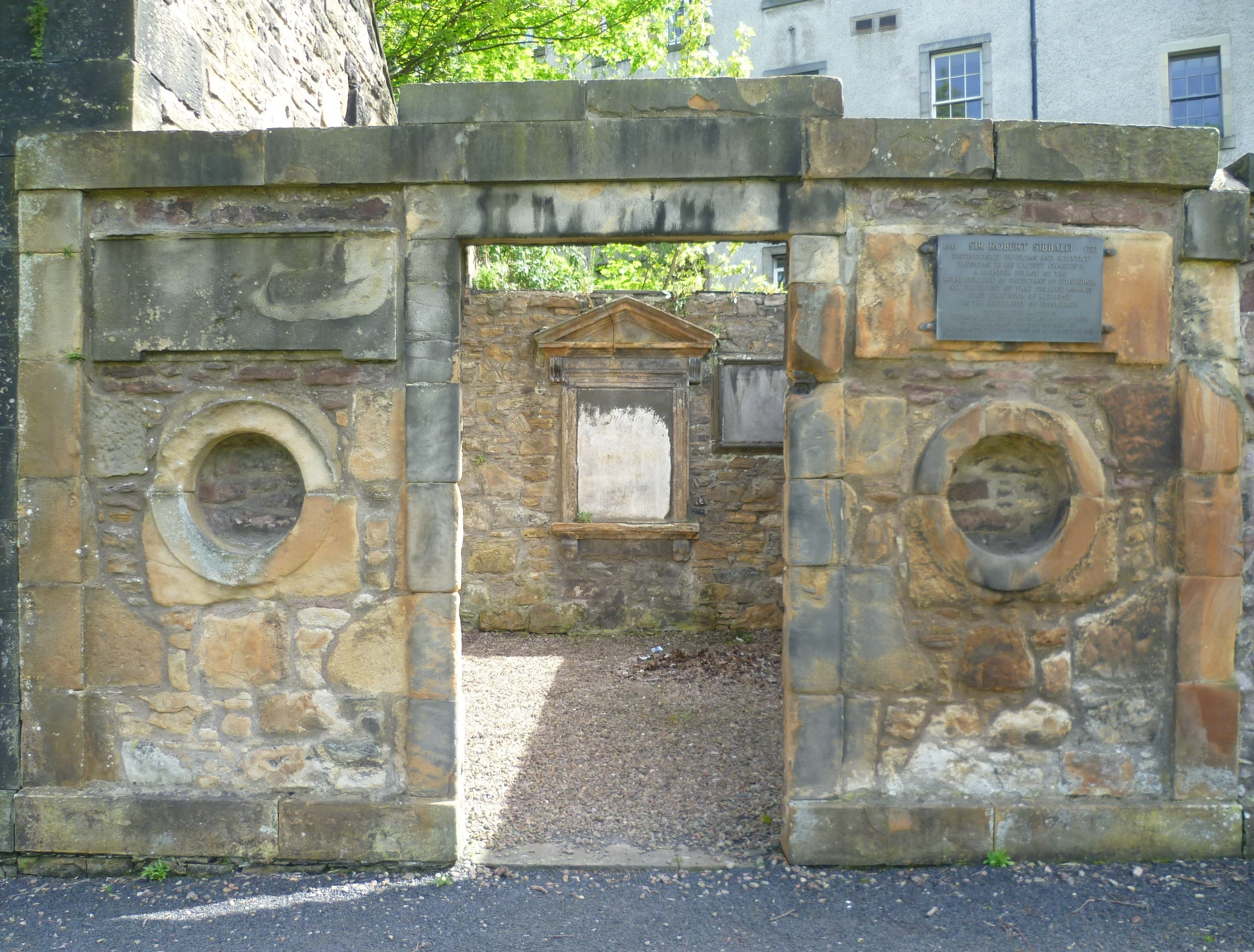
Sibbald mausoleum in Greyfriars, Edinburgh

Sibbaldia procumbens (Rosaceae), that Sibbald described and illustrated in his book Scotia illustrata in 1684 (volume 2, tab. 6(1)), was named after him in 1753 by Carl Linnaeus. Sibbaldia is a genus of about 13 species of flowering plants. In 1941, the Russian botanist Sergei Vasilievich Juzepczuk (1893–1959) published Sibbaldianthe, also in the family Rosaceae, which has about 7 species.

== Taxonomy of the blue whale—Sibbaldus ==
Sibbald is also remembered for his study of whales. Originally the blue whale was named after Sibbald, who first described it scientifically.

Although the blue whale is today usually classified as one of eight species in the genus Balaenoptera, one authority still places it in a separate monotypic genus, Sibbaldus, but this is not widely accepted.

The blue whale was once commonly referred to as Sibbald's rorqual.

== Works ==
Sibbald's historical and antiquarian works include:

- 1683: An Account of the Scottish Atlas. Folio, Edinburgh
- 1684: Scotia illustrata. Edinburgh
- 1699: Memoria Balfouriana; sive, Historia rerum, pro literis promovendis, gestarum a ... fratribus Balfouriis ... Jacobo ... et ... Andrea. Authore R.S.. Edinburgi: Typis Hæredum Andreæ Anderson
- 1699: Provision for the poor in time of dearth and scarcity
- 1710: A History Ancient and Modern of the Sheriffdoms of Fife and Kinross. Edinburgh
- 1711: Description of the Isles of Orkney and Shetland. Folio, Edinburgh
- 1803: A History Ancient and Modern of the Sheriffdoms of Fife and Kinross. Cupar
- 1837: The Remains of Sir Robert Sibbald, containing his autobiography, memoirs of the Royal College of Physicians, a portion of his literary correspondence, and an account of his MSS.; [edited by James Maidment], 2 pt. in 1 vol. Edinburgh: [printed for the editor]; edition of thirty-five copies; the titlepage of the Autobiography bears the date 1833
- 1845: Description of the Isles of Orkney and Shetland (folio, Edinburgh)
