= Otto Pfister (disambiguation) =

Otto Pfister is a German football manager.

Otto Pfister may also refer to:

- Otto Pfister (naturalist), Swiss nature photographer
- Otto Pfister (gymnast), Swiss gymnast
- Otto Pfister (architect), Swiss architect
