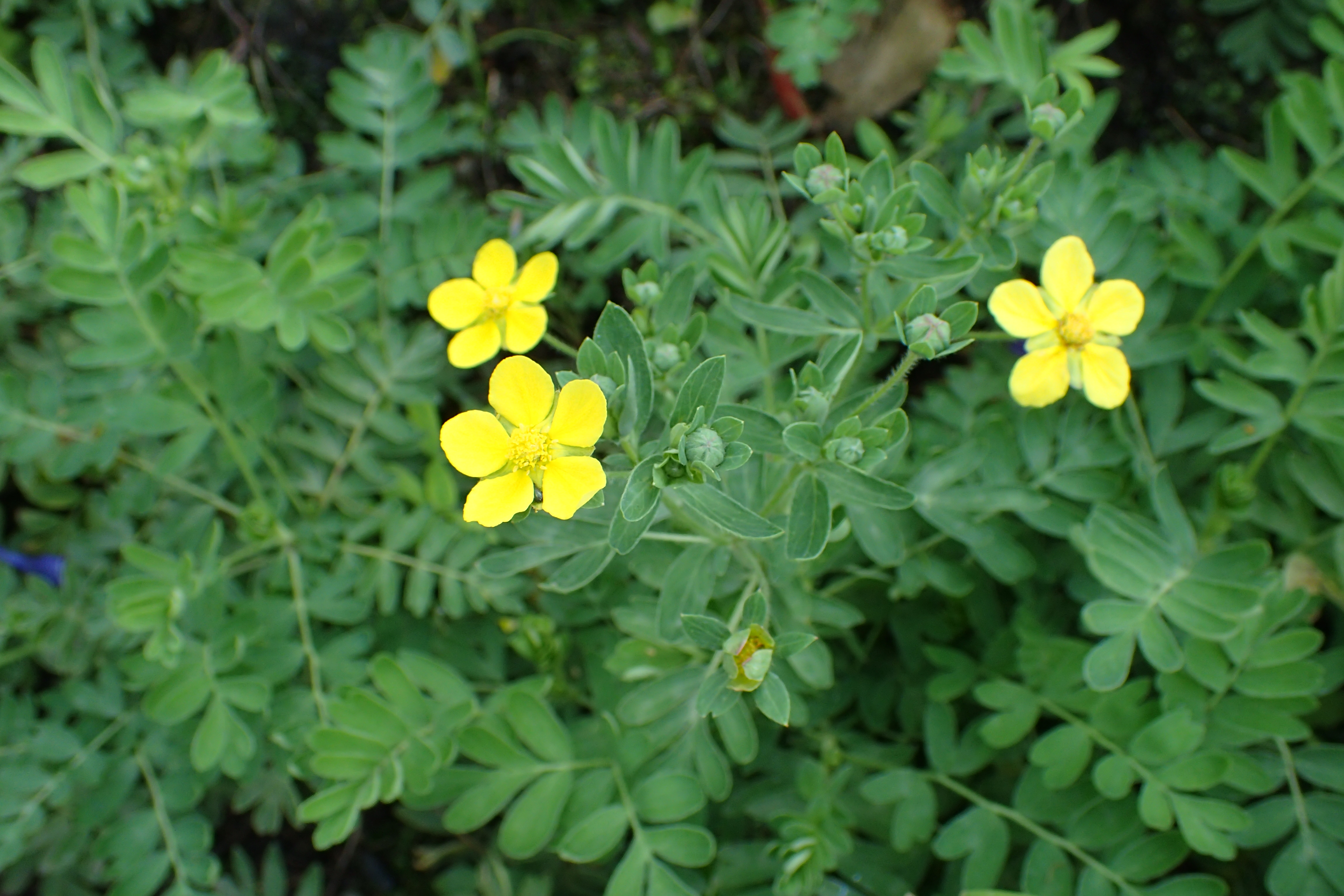

Scientific classification
- Kingdom: Plantae
- Clade: Tracheophytes
- Clade: Angiosperms
- Clade: Eudicots
- Clade: Rosids
- Order: Rosales
- Family: Rosaceae
- Genus: Sibbaldianthe
- Species: S. bifurca

Binomial name
- Sibbaldianthe bifurca (L.) Kurtto & T.Erikss.

Synonyms
- Potentilla bifurca L.

= Sibbaldianthe bifurca =

Species of plant

Sibbaldianthe bifurca is a species of flowering plant in the family Rosaceae which can be found in the steppes, grasslands and various slopes of Russia, Korea, and Mongolia at an elevation of 400–4,000 metres (1,300–13,100 ft). It is also found on sandy coasts of North and Northeast China. It was described by Carl Linnaeus in 1753 in his book Species Plantarum as Potentilla bifurca.

== Description ==
Plants are 5–20 centimetres (2–8 in) tall. Each leaf has 3–8 pairs of leaflets, which are elliptic to ovate or obovate, sessile, and 5–15 × 4–8 mm (0.2–0.6 × 0.2–0.3 in). The leaves are 3–8 cm (1.2–3.1 in) long with membranous brown stipules. Flowers up to 0.7–1.5 cm (0.3–0.6 in) across. The sepals are ovate, with acute apexes; the petals are yellow and obovate with rounded apexes. The ovary is pilose but the achenes are smooth. Both flowers and fruits appear from May to October.
