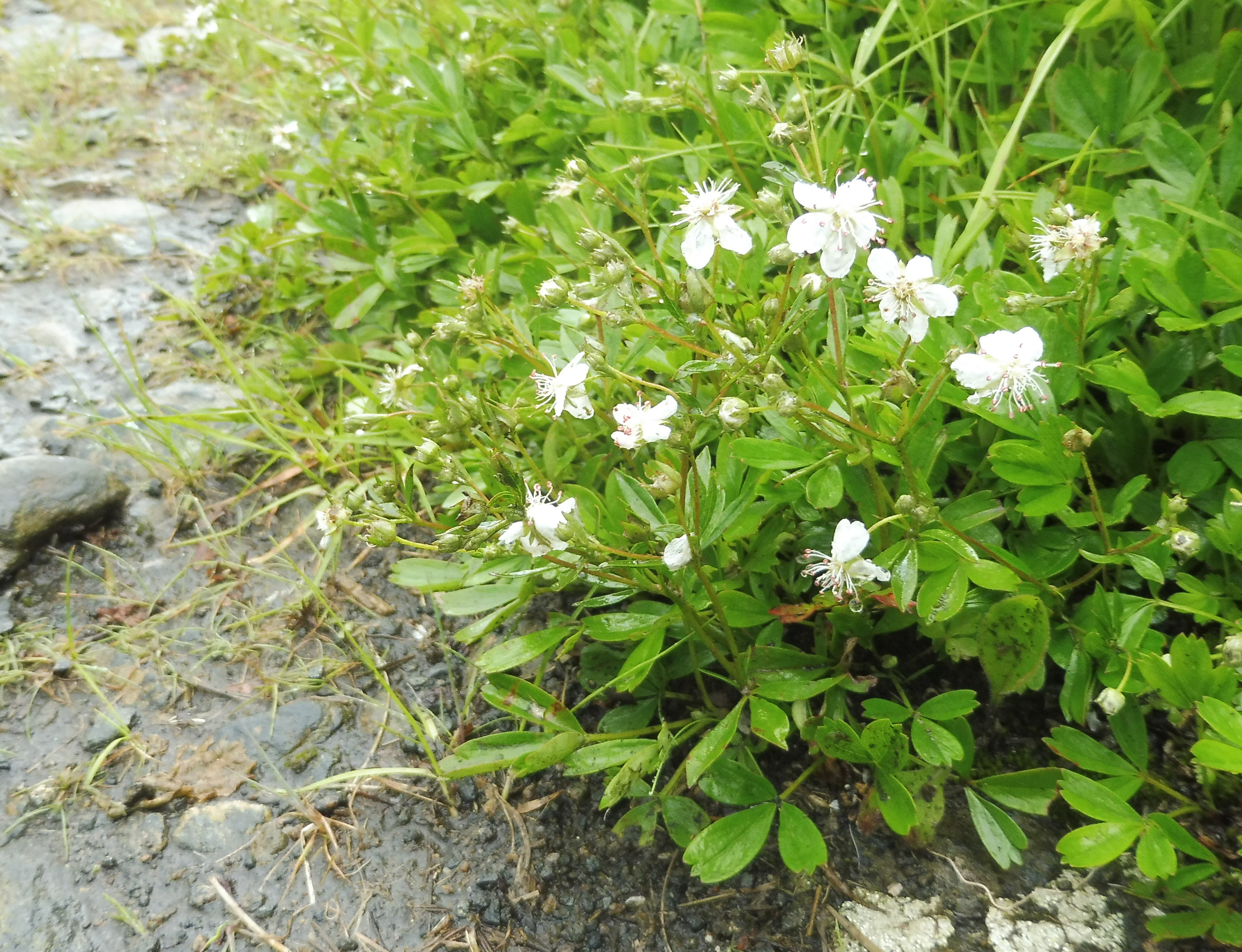

Conservation status
- Secure (NatureServe)

Scientific classification
- Kingdom: Plantae
- Clade: Tracheophytes
- Clade: Angiosperms
- Clade: Eudicots
- Clade: Rosids
- Order: Rosales
- Family: Rosaceae
- Genus: Sibbaldia
- Species: S. tridentata

Binomial name
- Sibbaldia tridentata (Aiton) Paule & Soják

Synonyms
- Potentilla retusa O.F.Müll., nom. utique rej.; Potentilla tridentata Aiton; Potentilla tridentata f. aurora Graustein; Potentilla tridentata f. hirsutifolia Pease; Sibbaldia retusa (O.F.Müll.) T.Erikss., nom. rej.; Sibbaldiopsis tridentata (Aiton) Rydb.; Sibbaldiopsis tridentata f. hirsutifolia (Pease) D.Löve & J.-P.Bernard; Trichothalamus tridentatus (Aiton) Spreng.

= Sibbaldia tridentata =

Species of plant

Sibbaldia tridentata is a species in the plant family Rosaceae. Its synonyms include the illegitimate name Sibbaldia retusa and Sibbaldiopsis tridentata. Under the latter name, it has been treated as the only species in the genus Sibbaldiopsis. Its English names include three-toothed cinquefoil, shrubby fivefingers, and wineleaf.

== Description ==
Sibbaldia tridentata is a short evergreen perennial plant, growing up to 10 in (25 cm). Its leaves are compound and trifoliate, usually growing at the base in an alternating pattern, each leaflet growing up to 1.5 in (3.8 cm) long and 0.5 in (1.3 cm) across. The leaflets are oblanceolate with a truncated tip having three teeth. The leaves are glossy and evergreen. They turn deep red in fall if the plants are grown in sun.

Its branches are herbaceous and pubescent, but its roots are woody.

Its flowers are small and white, radial, and arranged in a compound bracteate cyme, having five sepals and five petals with several stamens and a few pistils. The individual flowers resemble flowers from the genus Potentilla.

Its blooming period lasts two to three months, between June and August. Eventually, the triangular sepals fold up and tiny, hairy brown seeds develop inside them.

== Taxonomy ==
Sibbaldia tridentata was first described by William Aiton in 1789 as Potentilla tridentata. The name Potentilla retusa was published earlier, in 1780, but is a rejected name (nom. rej.), so names based on it, such as Sibbaldia retusa, are also rejected.

In 1898, the species was placed in its own genus Sibbaldiopsis. The genus name Sibbaldiopsis comes from Sibbaldia and the suffix -opsis, meaning "resembling". In 2009, it was transferred to Sibbaldia. The transfer was supported in 2014, based on molecular phylogenetic evidence, although the authors of the study noted distinct morphological differences from other members of the genus.

== Distribution and habitat ==
Sibbaldia tridentata prefers dry and acidic soil, usually on rocky or gravelly shores that have access to a lot of sun. It is often found on shale outcrops. The species is located all over the central to eastern American states, with disjunct populations extending down the Appalachian Mountains. The species also lives in the Canadian provinces east of and including Alberta, as well as Greenland. In Nova Scotia, the species is very common in the center of the Annapolis Valley and around cliffs or rocky outcrops. The southernmost known populations are located in Georgia and North Carolina, and occupy high-elevation rock outcrops and grassy balds.

Sibbaldia tridentata is listed as endangered in 5 US states.

== Sources ==
- Eriksson, Torsten; Hibbs, Malin S.; Yoder, Anne D.; Delwiche, Charles F.; Donoghue, Michael J. (2003). "The Phylogeny of Rosoideae (Rosaceae) Based on Sequences of the Internal Transcribed Spacers (ITS) of Nuclear Ribosomal DNA and the trnL/F Region of Chloroplast DNA". International Journal of Plant Sciences. 164 (2): 197–211. doi:10.1086/346163. S2CID 22378156.
- Radford, AE; Ahles, HE; Bell, CR (1964). Manual of the vascular flora of the Carolinas. Chapel Hill Press.
- NRCS (2007). "Sibbaldiopsis tridentata". PLANTS Database. United States Department of Agriculture (USDA).
