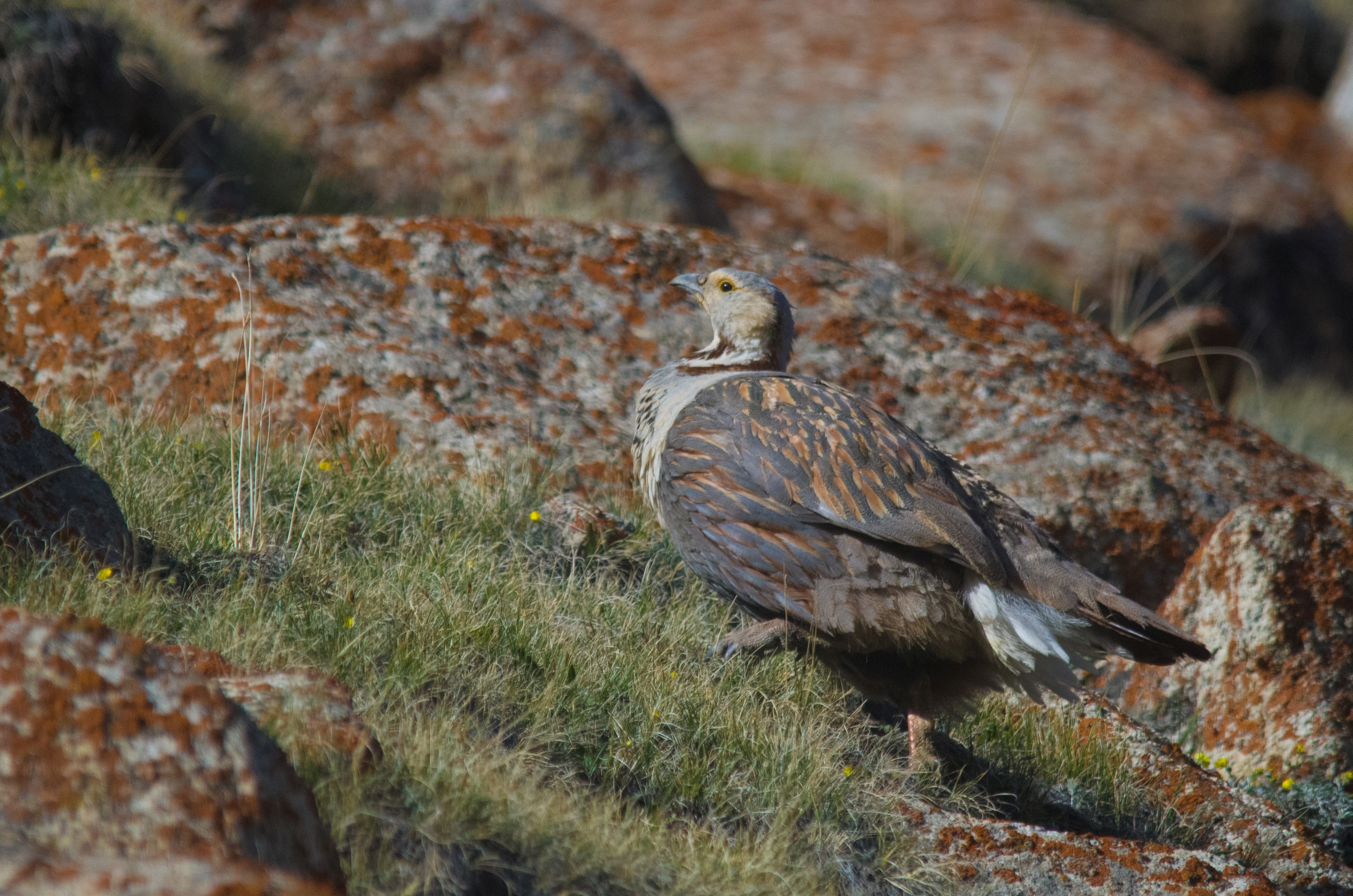

Conservation status
- Least Concern (IUCN 3.1)

Scientific classification
- Kingdom: Animalia
- Phylum: Chordata
- Class: Aves
- Order: Galliformes
- Family: Phasianidae
- Genus: Tetraogallus
- Species: T. himalayensis

Binomial name
- Tetraogallus himalayensis G.R. Gray, 1843

= Himalayan snowcock =

Species of bird

The Himalayan snowcock (Tetraogallus himalayensis) is a snowcock in the pheasant family Phasianidae found across the Himalayan ranges and parts of the adjoining Pamir range of Asia. It is found on alpine pastures and on steep rocky cliffs where they will dive down the hill slopes to escape. It overlaps with the slightly smaller Tibetan snowcock in parts of its wide range. The populations from different areas show variations in the colouration and about five subspecies have been designated. They were introduced in the mountains of Nevada in the United States in the 1960s and a wild population has established in the Ruby Mountains.

== Description ==
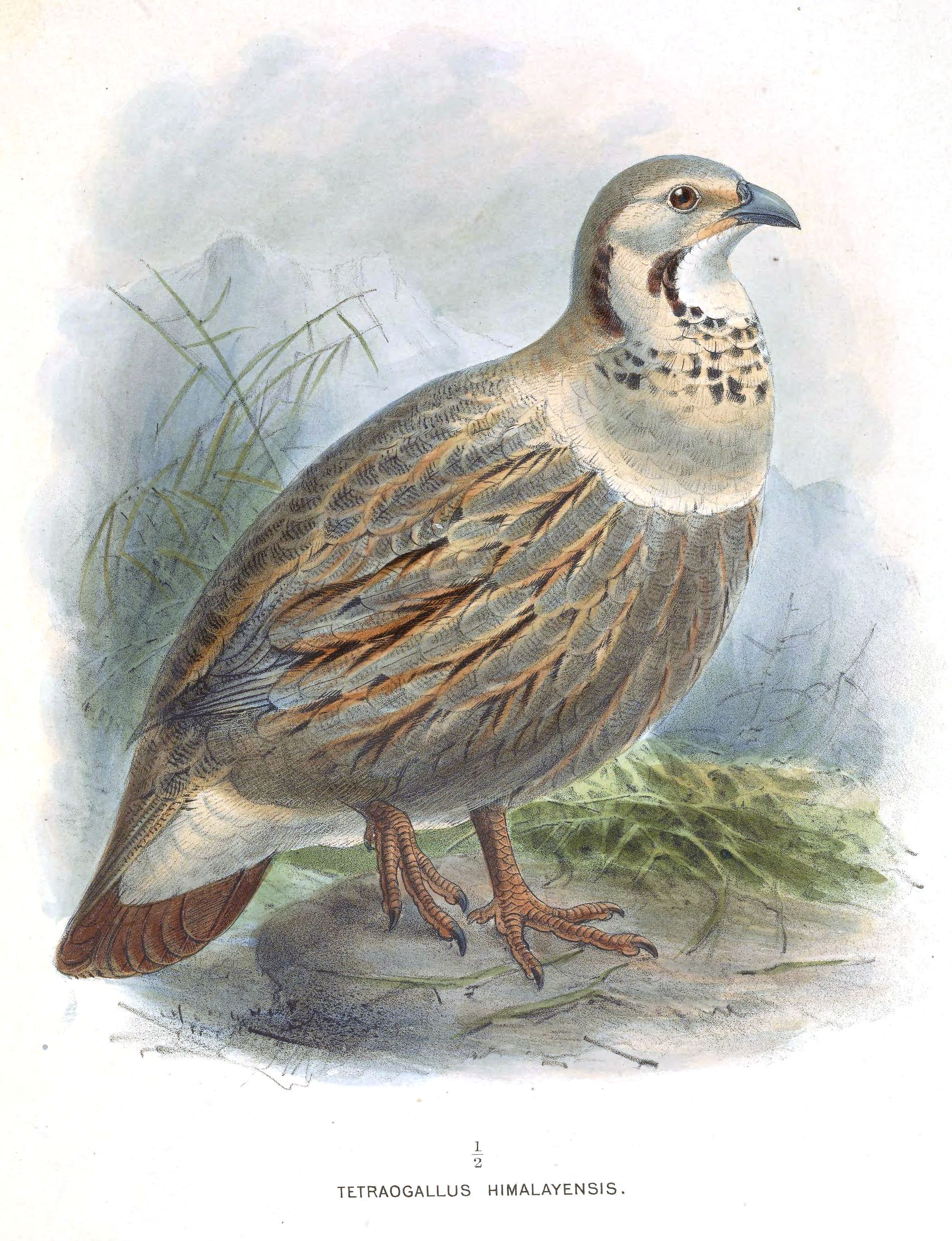
Illustration by J. G. Keulemans (1891)

The Himalayan snowcock is a large grey partridge-like bird, 55–74 cm (22–29 in) in length and weighing 2–3.1 kg (4.4–6.8 lb). The head pattern has a resemblance to that of the smaller and well marked chukar partridge. The white throat and sides of the head are bordered by chestnut moustachial stripe and a dark broad chestnut band stretching from the eye over the ear, expanding into the collar. The upper parts are grey, with feathers of the rump and the wings are bordered with rufous. The upper breast is grey with dark crescent bars. The lower breast plumage is dark grey, and the sides of the body are streaked with black, chestnut and white. The undertail coverts are white. The legs and orbital skin are yellow. Sexes are alike in plumage, but the female is smaller and lacks the large tarsal spur of the male. In flight, from above, the white primaries tipped in black and the rufous outer tail feathers make it distinctive. The Tibetan snowcock has a wing pattern with white trailing edge to the secondaries that contrasts with the grey wings.

== Taxonomy and systematics ==
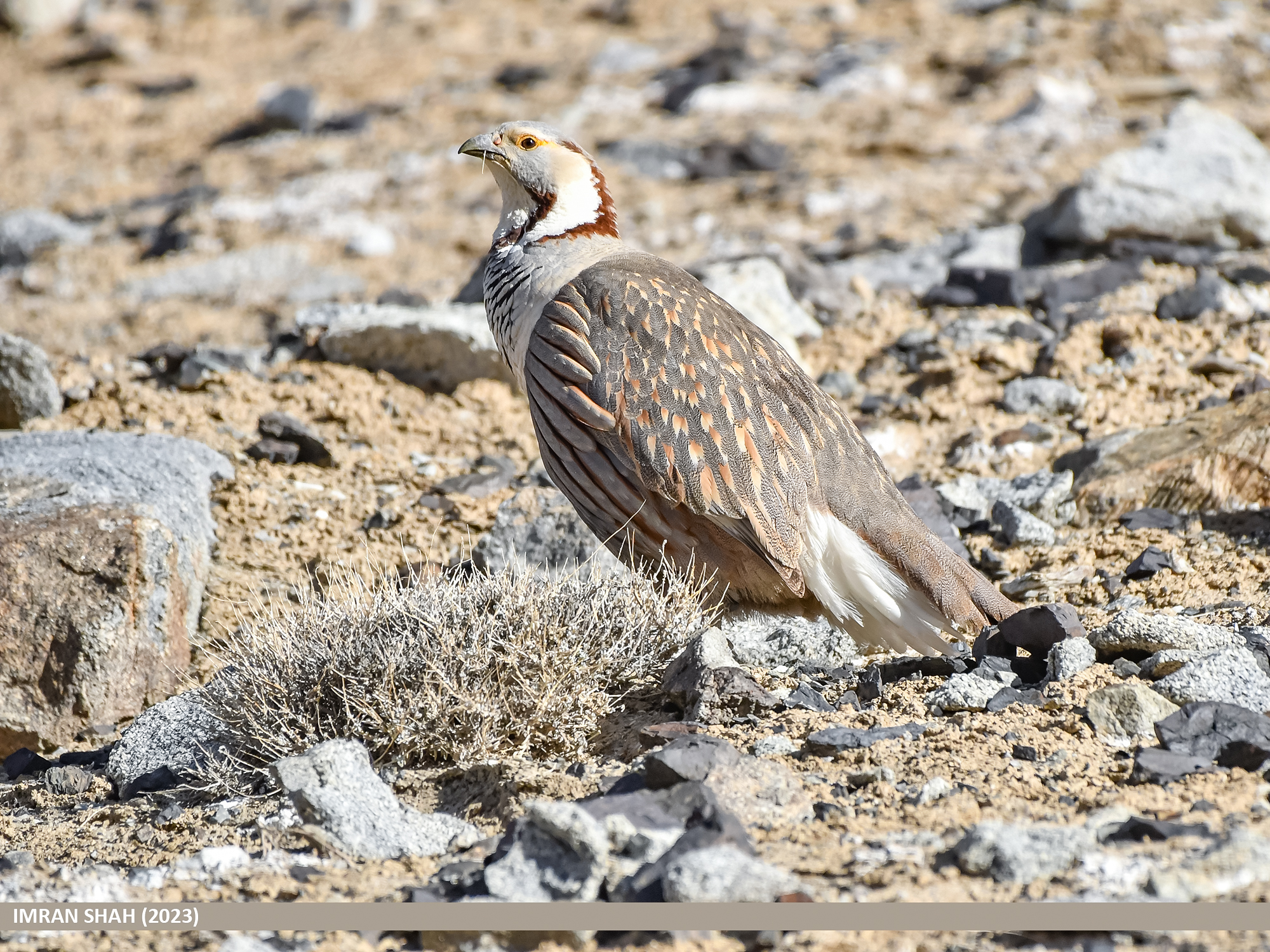

Around 1841, a specimen of a bird was brought to the menagerie of the Zoological Society of London, presented by E. W. Bonham, consul at Tabrez. George Robert Gray noted that it matched a bird illustrated (plate 76) in Jardine and Selby's "Illustrations of Ornithology" which he noted should be called as Tetraogallus caucasicus and another illustration plate 141 which was said to be the male of the one in plate 76 was separated based on the geography and given the name of Tetraogallus himalayensis. The main populations are separated by the Taklamakan desert and the separation has been estimated to have happened after the Pleistocene glaciations (1 mya). The large distribution range is fragmented and these disjunct populations show variations in plumage that have been named as subspecies. Although several subspecies have been described, not all are recognized. A subspecies described as sauricus was the subject of considerable nomenclatural debate.

- The nominate subspecies was described by G. R. Gray in 1843 and refers to the populations from eastern Afghanistan extending to Ladakh and the central Himalayas of Nepal.
- incognitus described by Zarudny in 1911 from the mountains of southern Tajikistan and northern Afghanistan, is overall much paler with very light chestnut and black markings on underside and buffier.(bendi described by Walter Norman Koelz is usually included in this)
- sewerzowi Zarudny, 1910 – Tien Shan to Zaysan (Kazakhstan) east to Xinjiang (not recognized by Ernst Hartert)
- grombczewskii Bianchi, 1898 – Kunlun Mountains
- koslowi Bianchi, 1898 – Nan Shan and Ching Hai Ku Mountains of Qinghai and S Gansu

== Distribution and status ==
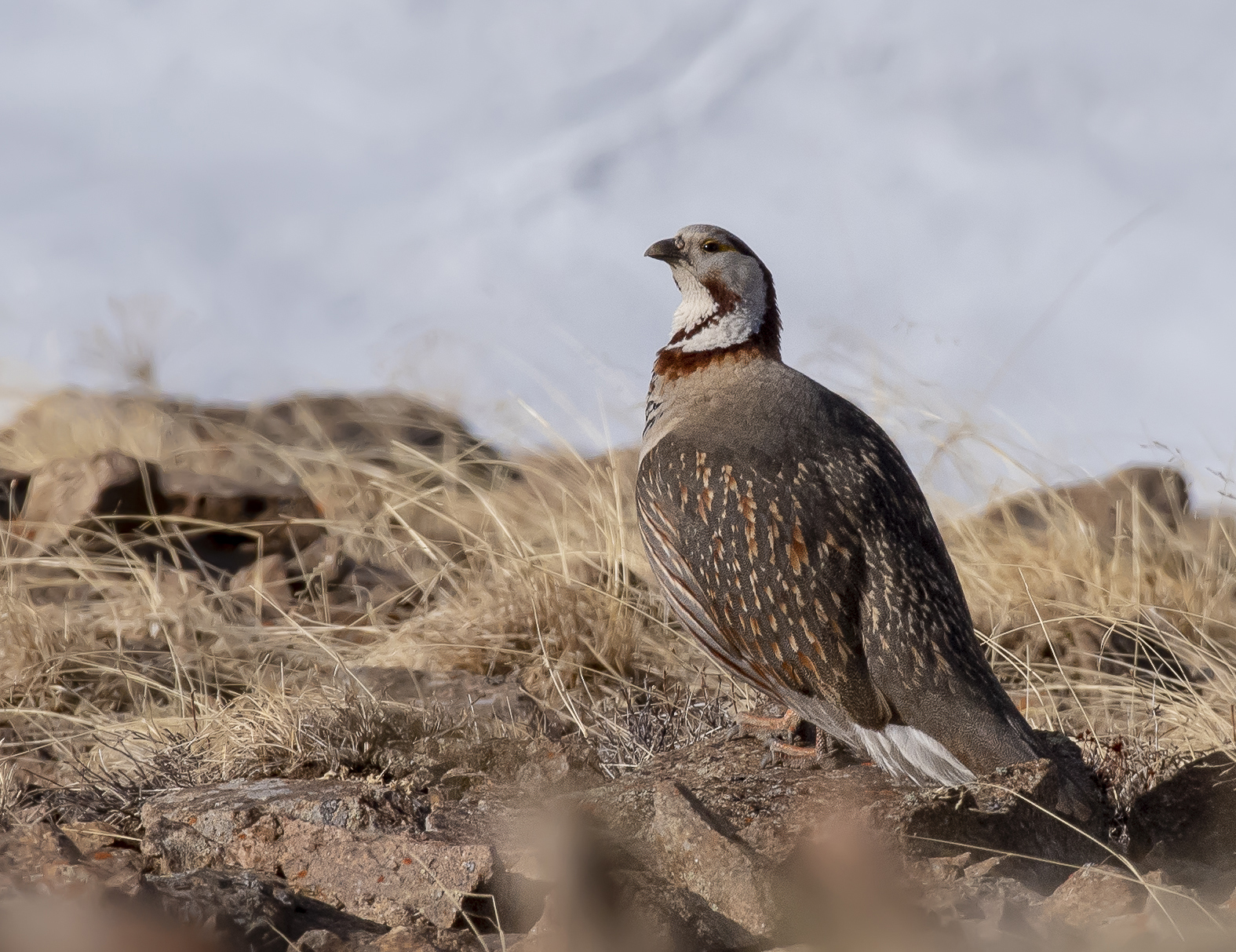

Himalayan snowcock frequents alpine pastures and steep ridges of mountains of Central and South Asia above the treeline and near the snowline. In the Himalayas, it is found between 4000 and 5000 m elevation in summer, descending to 2400 m during severe winters. Since the Himalayan snowcock has a large distribution range and no visible declines in population, it has been considered a species of "least concern" by the IUCN.

In 1961 the similarity of the Himalayan landscape to the Nevada region was noted and the Himalayan snowcock was considered as a good game bird for introduction by the Nevada Fish and Game Commission. The Commission then approached the President of Pakistan for some birds. These were wild trapped in Hunza and early shipments faced heavy losses after which birds were locally reared at Mason Valley game farm and over a 15-year period (1965–1979) more than 2000 birds were released into the wild. A wild population more than 200 to 500 birds has established itself in the Ruby Mountains, where they forage above the treeline.

== Behaviour and ecology ==
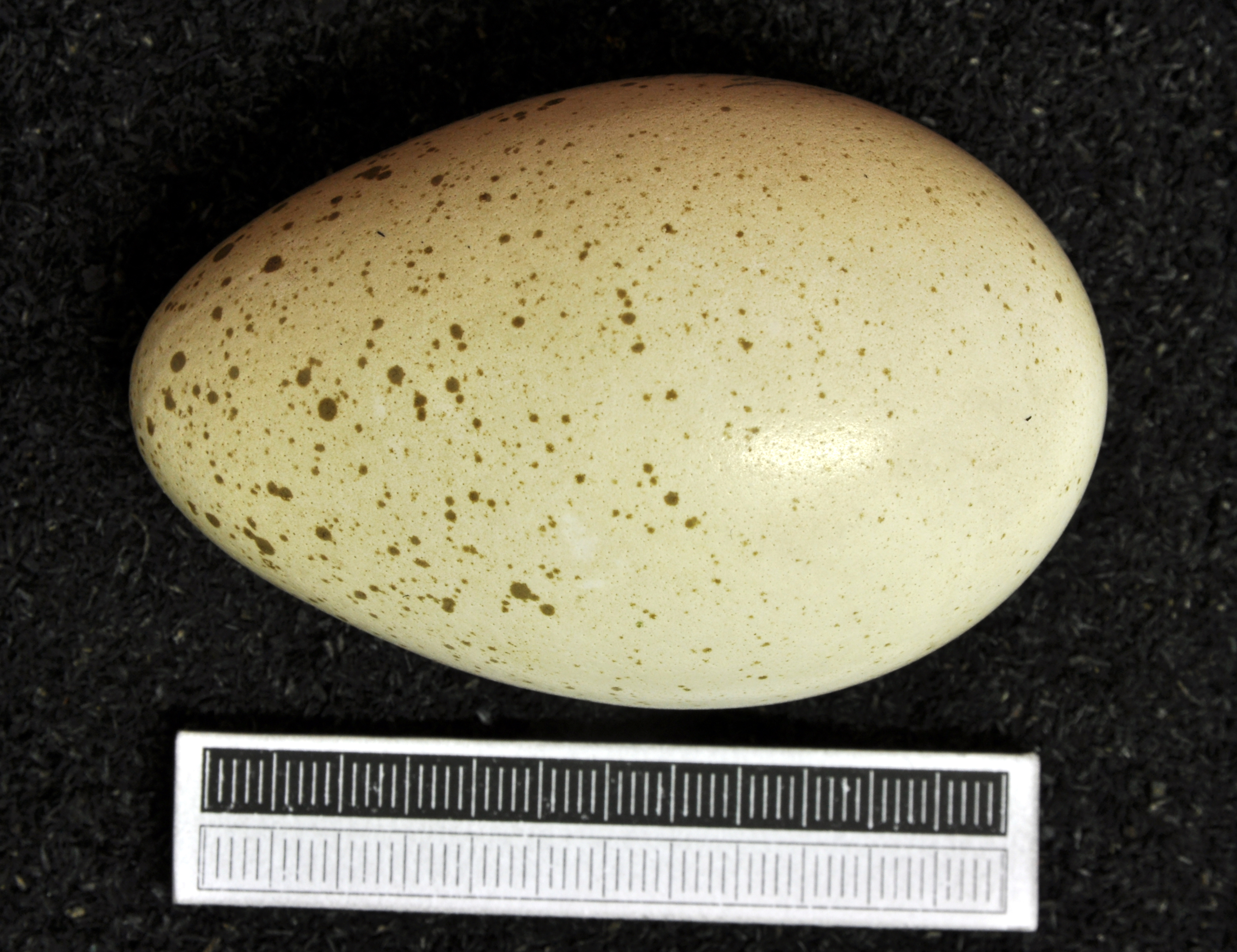
Egg, Collection Museum Wiesbaden

Himalayan snowcocks are gregarious when not breeding, moving around in small groups. Several groups may inhabit the same hill. They keep entirely to open country and seem to prefer rocky hill-sides. They feed on grass, shoots, berries, seeds. In the mornings the birds fly downhill to drink water. When approached from below their level, they attempt to climb up the slopes on foot and when approached from above they dive down the valleys on open wings. In India, the breeding season is in summer, April to June. It is silent in winter but in spring, its call is a familiar part of the landscape. The song is a loud whistle with three parts with the tone ascending. They also make a rising, shrill piping call.

When feeding they walk slowly up hill, picking up the tender blades of grass and young shoots of plants on the way. They have been noted feeding on the berries of Ephedra, leaves of Artemisia, grass shoots, bulbs and the heads of a rye-like grass. In the Hunza range, they have been observed to prefer Sibbaldia cuneata. Once they reach the top of a ridge of the hill, they fly off to adjacent hill, alighting some distance down, and again picking their way upwards. When walking, they cock their tails showing the white under tail coverts. They are generally wary and when disturbed run uphill and then launch themselves from the crests in flight, getting up considerable speed. They are more prone to predation on the alpine pastures than on steep slopes and flocking helps them to keep more eyes out for predators allowing them to forage more efficiently. In the Hunza range, flock sizes tended to be larger in rocky habitats, where they risked being attacked by Golden Eagles, than on grassy meadows.

The breeding season is summer, April to June. During courtship, the male crouches low down to the ground with wings slightly spread, tail depressed and feathers slightly ruffled. Then, he runs backwards and forwards in front of the hen or in circles. The nest is a bare ground scrape sheltered under a stone or bush, preferably close to the crest of a ridge on the leeward side. About 5 to 12 long oval eggs are laid which are a stony olive or brown colour and spotted throughout with red or brown. The eggs are incubated only by the female. The male is monogamous, staying in the vicinity of the nest often seen perched on some elevated rock and keeping a watch against intruders. When disturbed, the cock warns the female with a loud whistle. If caught unaware in the nest, the hen bird will not leave the nest until approached very close. The eggs hatched in an incubator after about 27–28 days.

Adults are sometimes preyed on by golden eagles. Several species of endoparasitic Acanthocephala and Nematoda such as Hispaniolepis fedtschenkoi, have been described from the species.

== Other sources ==
- Pheasants, Partridges and Grouse by Madge and McGowan, ISBN 0-7136-3966-0
- National Geographic Field Guide to the Birds of North America ISBN 0-7922-6877-6
- Handbook of the Birds of the World Vol 2, Josep del Hoyo editor, ISBN 84-87334-10-5
- "National Audubon Society" The Sibley Guide to Birds, by David Allen Sibley, ISBN 0-679-45122-6
