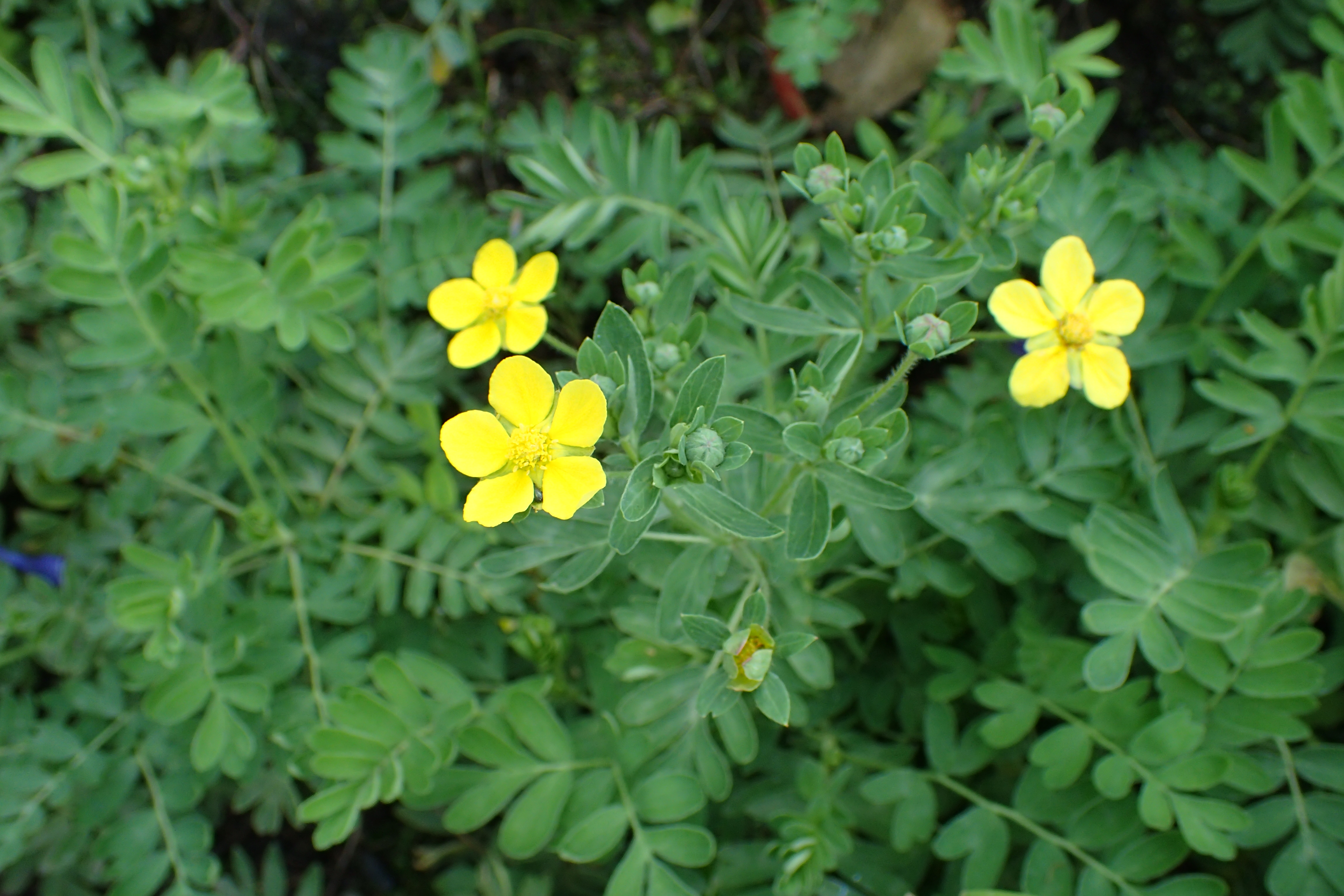
- Sibbaldianthe bifurca in the Berlin Botanical Garden and Botanical Museum

Scientific classification
- Kingdom: Plantae
- Clade: Tracheophytes
- Clade: Angiosperms
- Clade: Eudicots
- Clade: Rosids
- Order: Rosales
- Family: Rosaceae
- Subfamily: Rosoideae
- Tribe: Potentilleae
- Subtribe: Fragariinae
- Genus: Sibbaldianthe; Juz.

Synonyms
- Schistophyllidium (Juz. ex Fed.) Ikonn.

= Sibbaldianthe =

Species of flowering plant

Sibbaldianthe is a genus of flowering plants belonging to the family Rosaceae. It is also in the Rosoideae subfamily.

Its native range is from south eastern and eastern Europe (within East European Russia, Central European Russia, Crimea, Romania, South European Russia and Ukraine), to temperate Asia including Siberia (Altay, Buryatiya, Chita, Irkutsk, Krasnoyarsk, Tuva and West Siberia,), Russian Far East (Amur, Kamchatka, Khabarovsk, Magadan, Primorye and Sakhalin), central Asia (within Kazakhstan, Kyrgyzstan, Tajikistan, Turkmenistan and Uzbekistan), the Caucasus (North Caucasus and Transcaucasus,) Western Asia (Afghanistan, Iran and Turkey), China (within Inner Mongolia, Manchuria, Qinghai, Tibet and Xinjiang,) Mongolia, Korea, tropical Asia (within East Himalaya, Nepal, Pakistan and West Himalaya).

The genus name of Sibbaldianthe is in honour of Robert Sibbald (1641–1722), a Scottish physician and antiquary. It was first described and published in V.L.Komarov (ed.), Fl. URSS Vol.10 on page 615 in 1941.

== known species ==
According to Kew:

- Sibbaldianthe adpressa (Bunge) Juz.
- Sibbaldianthe bifurca (L.) Kurtto & T.Erikss.
- Sibbaldianthe imbricata (Kar. & Kir.) Mosyakin & Shiyan
- Sibbaldianthe moorcroftii (Wall. ex Lehm.) Mosyakin & Shiyan
- Sibbaldianthe orientalis (Juz. ex Soják) Mosyakin & Shiyan
- Sibbaldianthe semiglabra (Juz. ex Soják) Mosyakin & Shiyan
- Sibbaldianthe sericea Grubov
