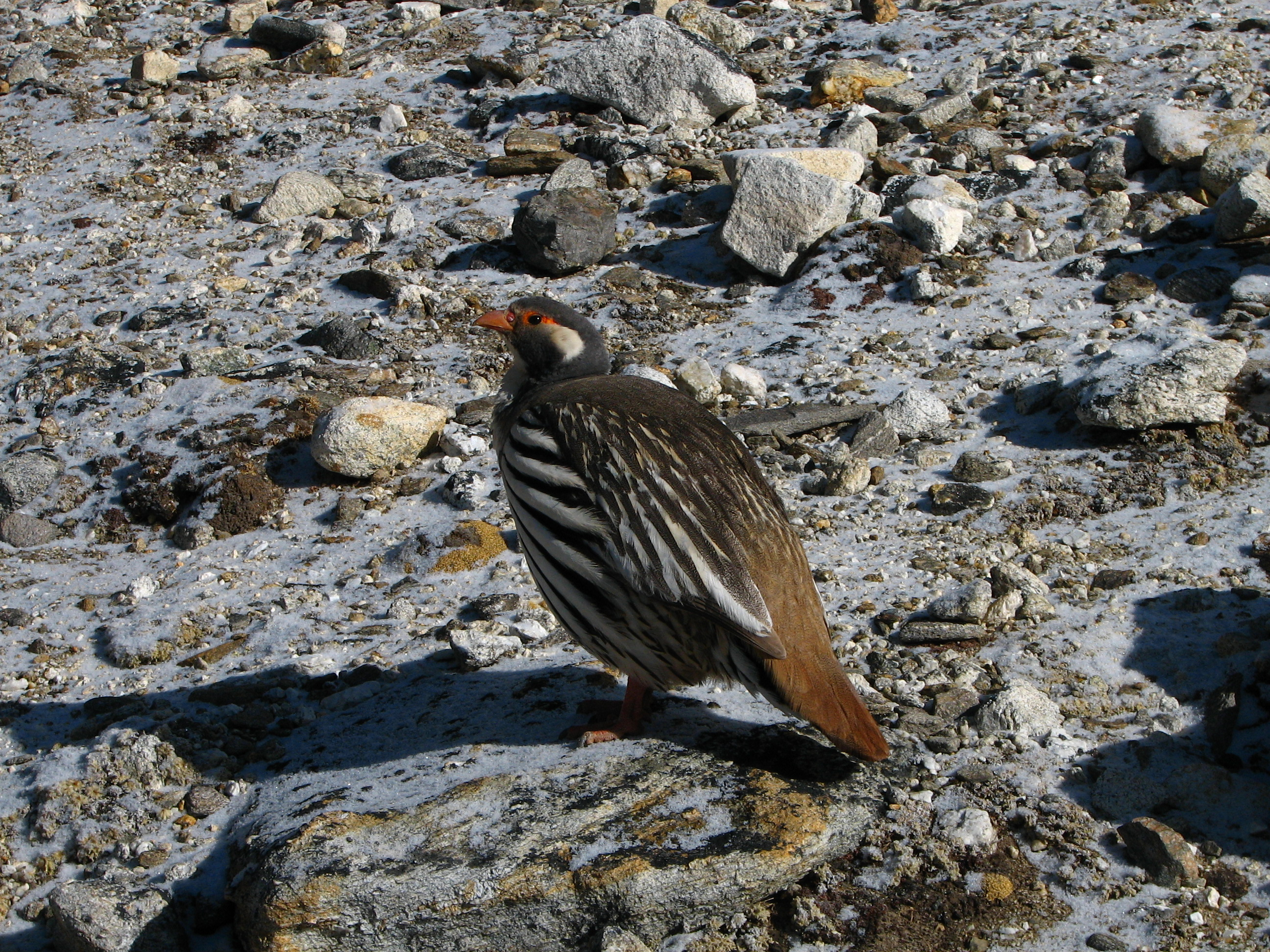

Conservation status
- Least Concern (IUCN 3.1)
- CITES Appendix I

Scientific classification
- Kingdom: Animalia
- Phylum: Chordata
- Class: Aves
- Order: Galliformes
- Family: Phasianidae
- Genus: Tetraogallus
- Species: T. tibetanus

Binomial name
- Tetraogallus tibetanus Gould, 1854

= Tibetan snowcock =

Species of bird

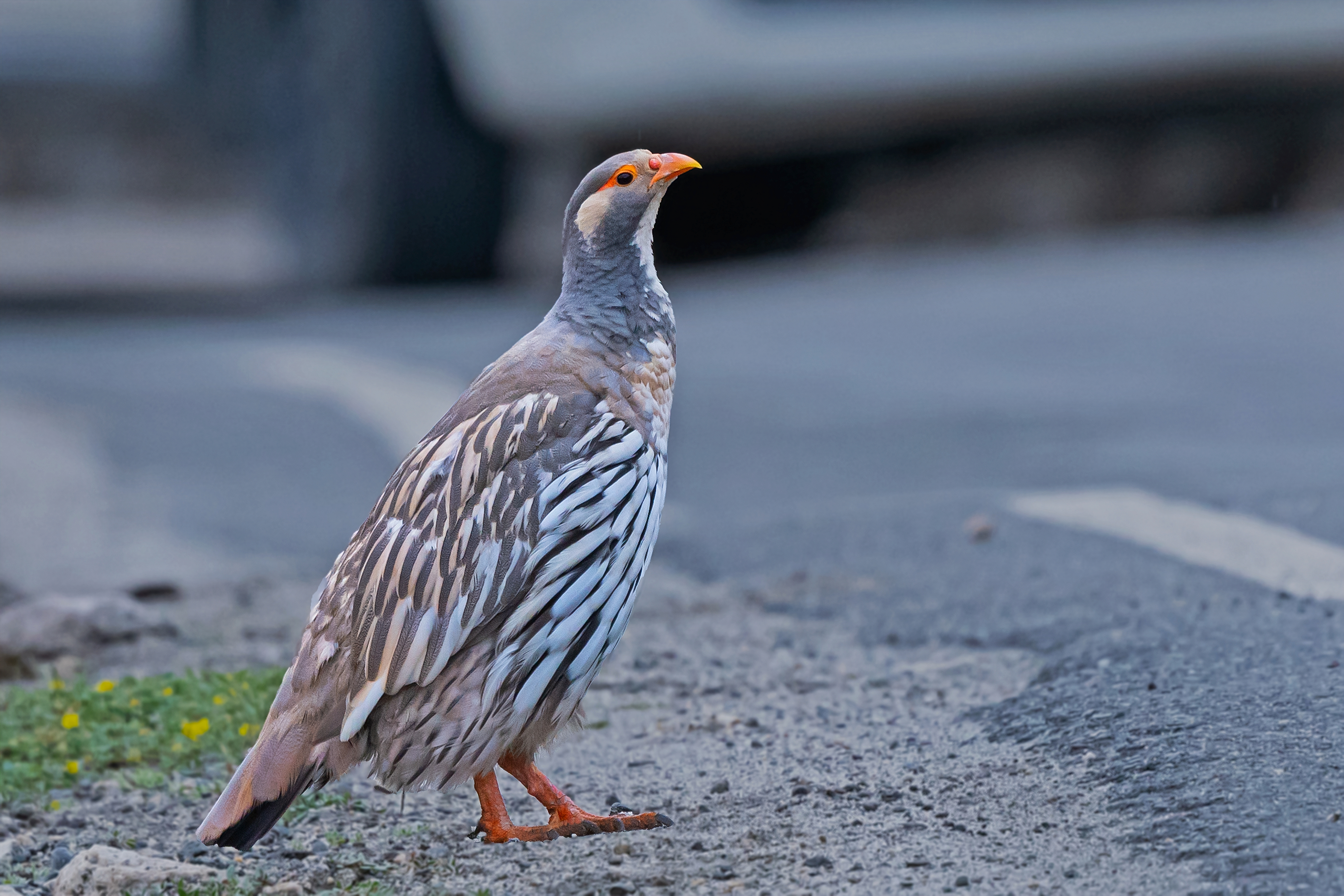
Tibetan Snowcock in Zingral Transit Check Post, Leh, Ladakh

The Tibetan snowcock (Tetraogallus tibetanus) is a bird in the pheasant family Phasianidae of the order Galliformes, gallinaceous birds. This species is found in high-altitude regions of the Western Himalayas and the Tibetan Plateau, where it overlaps in part with the larger Himalayan snowcock. The head is greyish and there is a white crescent patch behind the eye and underside is white with black stripes. In flight the secondaries show a broad white trailing edge.

== Description ==
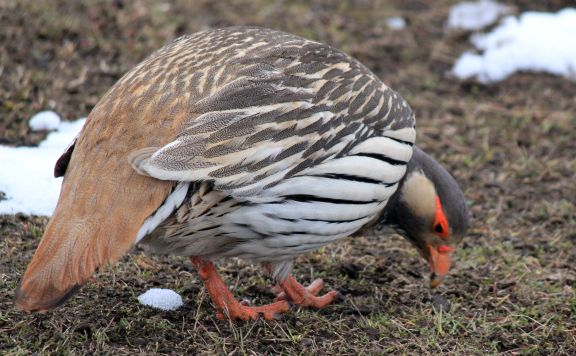
Tibetan Snowcock at Luza, Sagarmatha National Park, Nepal

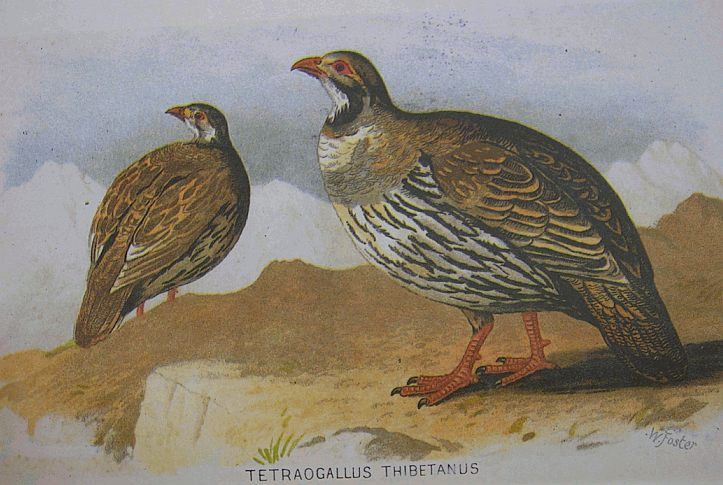
Illustration from Hume and Marshall, Gamebirds of India, Burma and Ceylon

Smaller than Himalayan snowcock, this species has a grey head and neck with a white patch behind the eye and above the dark cheek. Chin, throat and breast are white, with two grey bands on the breast. Grey wing coverts and tertials have a white trim. The secondaries have a broad white trailing edge that forms a wing band. Underparts are white with black streaks on flanks and belly. The tail is rufous brown and the undertail coverts are black. Legs and beaks are reddish. Sexes are similar, but female has buff in postocular patch, blackish and buff marks on sides of head, neck and breast-band, and lacks the tarsal spurs of the male.

== Taxonomy and systematics ==
The widely distributed populations show variations in plumage and about five subspecies have been designated:

- The nominate race, described by John Gould in 1853, is distributed across the Pamirs in Tajikistan, southeast to Western Tibet and Ladakh. It is paler than the other races
- aquilonifer, described by Sushkin in 1926, is found in Central and East Himalayas (Nepal, Sikkim, western Bhutan), is darker and has darker brown tail
- centralis, described by Meinertzhagen in 1926, is sometimes lumped with przewalskii. This race is dark, and less fulvous than aquilonifer. This is found in central Tibet and extends to the Abor and the Mishmi Hills of India.
- przewalskii was described by Bianchi in 1907, is found from North East India to West Central China
- henrici, described by Oustalet in 1891, is found from Eastern Tibet to North West Sichuan.

Some races such as tschimenensis and yunnanensis are not widely recognized, the former included in the nominate form. The genetic divergence of these populations has been attributed to glacial cycles associated with the uplift of the Tibetan plateau.

== Distribution and status ==
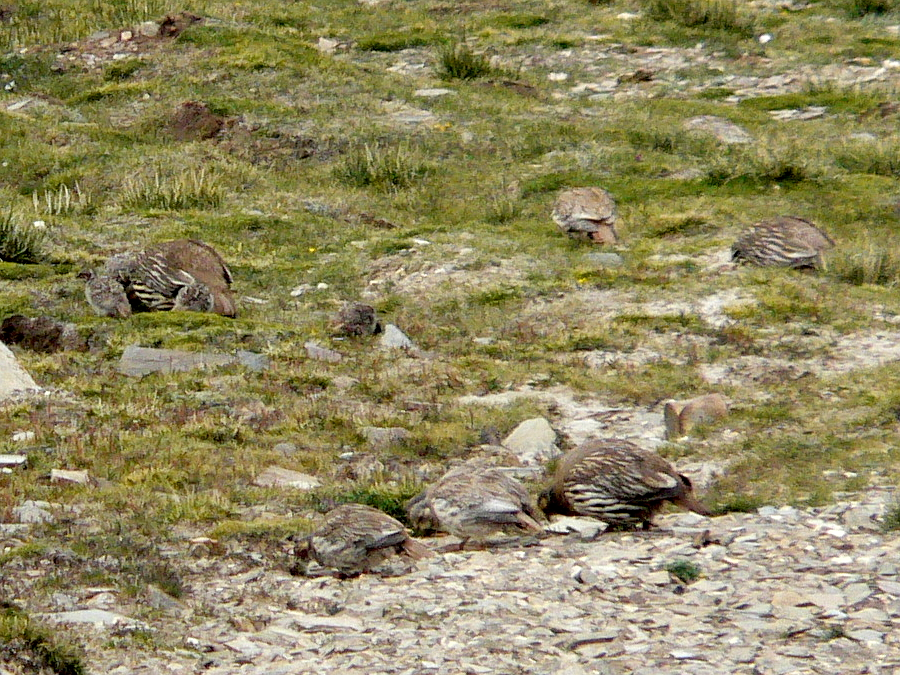
A foraging group in Ladakh

Tibetan snowcock are found on alpine pastures stony ridges above the tree line in the Pamirs of Tajikistan, Himalayas (from Ladakh to Arunachal Pradesh), Tibet, Pakistan and China. They are found in lower altitudes during winter or when there is heavy snowfall. In parts of its range there appears to be a clear separation of the distribution of this and the Himalayan snowcock while in others they appear to overlap.

Since the Tibetan snowcock has a large distribution range and no visible declines in population, it has been considered a species of "least concern" by the IUCN.

== Behaviour and ecology ==
This species is similar to the Himalayan snowcock, but prefers higher altitudes. During winter, they descend to lower altitudes and move around in coveys. When approached from below on a hill slope, they move up, stopping every now and then to look at the intruder, but when alarmed they fly away downwards crossing the valley/ravine. The flight is swift and will often make a whistling call in flight. They call several times while alighting and on settling from flight they shake their tails several times in the manner of willow ptarmigan. They call in the morning and evening, becoming quiet in the middle of the day. They keep to grass-covered plateaus and ridges or to the more barren and stony plains with very little vegetation. Though they do not keep sentries during feeding, while resting in the middle of the day, one or more of adult birds mount high boulders and keep a watch, warning the flocks on the approach of danger with loud prolonged whistles. Several calls have been described that include a chuckling that gradually becomes louder, a whistle and a curlew-like call.

During summer, they form pairs and males are believed to be monogynous. The nest is a scrape, sparsely lined and sheltered under a stone or bush usually on the leeward side of a bare hill, and avoiding ground with vegetation. About 4 to 6 eggs are laid. The male stands sentinel while the females incubate. Both parent birds accompany the brood and adults perform distraction displays when the young are threatened, while the chicks crouch or hide between stones. Broods of more than one female have been found to form a single foraging group.
