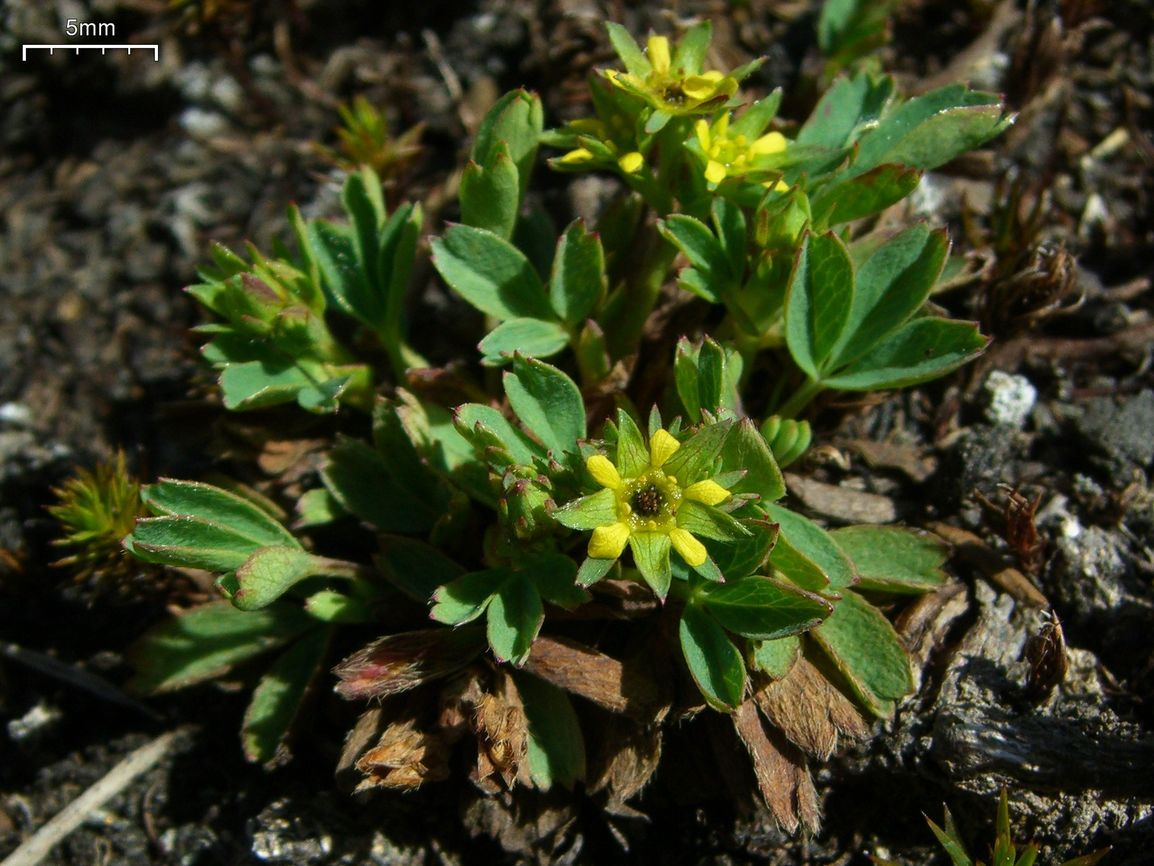

Scientific classification
- Kingdom: Plantae
- Clade: Tracheophytes
- Clade: Angiosperms
- Clade: Eudicots
- Clade: Rosids
- Order: Rosales
- Family: Rosaceae
- Genus: Sibbaldia
- Species: S. procumbens

Binomial name
- Sibbaldia procumbens L.

Synonyms
- Potentilla sibbaldii

= Sibbaldia procumbens =

Species of flowering plant

Sibbaldia procumbens (or creeping sibbaldia) is a species of flowering plant of the genus Sibbaldia in the rose family. It has an Arctic–alpine distribution; it can be found throughout the Arctic, as well as at higher elevations in the mountains of Eurasia and North America. It grows on tundra and in alpine climates where snow remains year-round, and on subalpine mountain slopes. This is a low, mat-forming perennial herb producing clumps of herbage in rocky, gravelly substrate. A spreading stem up to 15 centimeters long grows from a caudex. Each leaf is divided into usually three leaflets borne at the end of a petiole up to 7 centimeters long. Each wedge-shaped leaflet has three teeth at the tip. The flower has usually five pointed green bractlets, five wider pointed green sepals, and five tiny yellowish petals each about a millimeter long. The fruits develop in the remnants of the sepals on erect stalks.

== Distribution ==
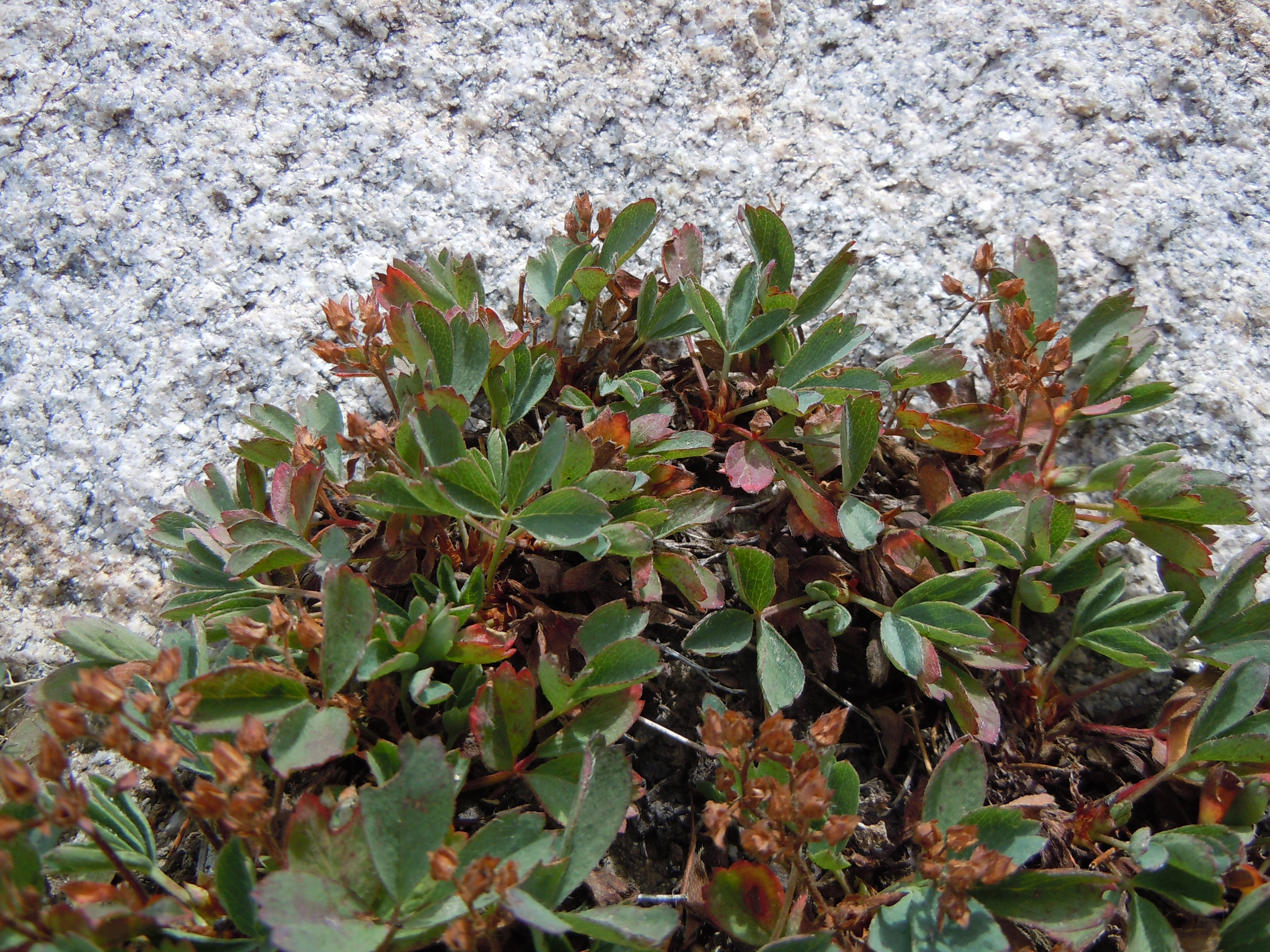

The plant has an Arctic–alpine distribution. It is found in the Pyrenees, in places in the Cantabrians and Sierra Nevada of Spain, in the Alps, the Vosges in France, on Corsica, in a few locations in the central Apennines, in the Tatras on the border of Slovakia and Poland, in Bulgaria's Rila and Pirin. In northern Europe, it grows in Scotland, on the Faroe Islands, Iceland, Jan Mayen and Svaalbard, throughout the Scandinavian Mountains, in northern Finland, in the northern Urals, and along the Arctic coastline of European Russia from the Kola Peninsula in the west to the Gulf of Ob in the east.

The plant is also found in extensive areas in some of the Central Asian and South Siberian mountains, including Tian Shan, the Tarbagatay, Altai and Sayan ranges, and the Transbaikal highlands. There are occurrences in the mountains of western China (including in the provinces of Shaanxi, Sichuan and Yunnan), in the Changbai Mountains on the boundary with Korea, in the Japanese Alps, on the island of Sakhalin and in isolated areas on the nearby Russian mainland. It is widely distributed in eastern Kamchatka, in Chukotka, on the Aleut Islands, in parts of Alaska, and then across the constituent ranges of the North American Cordillera in western Canada and the United States, its continuous area reaching its southern limits in the San Bernardino Mountains in California, the San Francisco Peaks in Arizona and the Sangre de Cristo Mountains of New Mexico, with the species reappearing further south at high altitudes in the Transvolcanic Belt of central Mexico.

It is also found in the northeast of the continent: in the White Mountains of New Hampshire, in the Chic-Choc Mountains of the Gaspé region of Quebec, in the Long Range Mountains on Newfoundland, and then more sporadically further north in Canada: along the coasts of northern Quebec and Labrador, in some areas around Hudson Bay and in the south of Baffin Island. Finally, the plant is also known from both the western and the eastern coastal areas of Greenland.
