= Otto Pfister (naturalist) =

Nature photographer and author

Otto Pfister is a nature photographer with particular expertise on the wildlife of Ladakh, India. While working in India for over 12 years with the Swiss Agency for Development and Cooperation, he was an avid bird photographer in his free time, eventually transitioning to a naturalist with strong interests in biodiversity monitoring and conservation.

Pfister is the author of Birds and Mammals of Ladakh (2004) and co-author of A Photographic Guide to the Birds of the Himalayas (1998). He has also authored, with Bikram Grewal and Bill Harvey, A Photographic Guide to the Birds of India (2002).

His favourite lens is the Nikkor 500 mm/f4.

Born in Switzerland, Pfister has lived in different parts of the world, currently making his home in Colombia.
