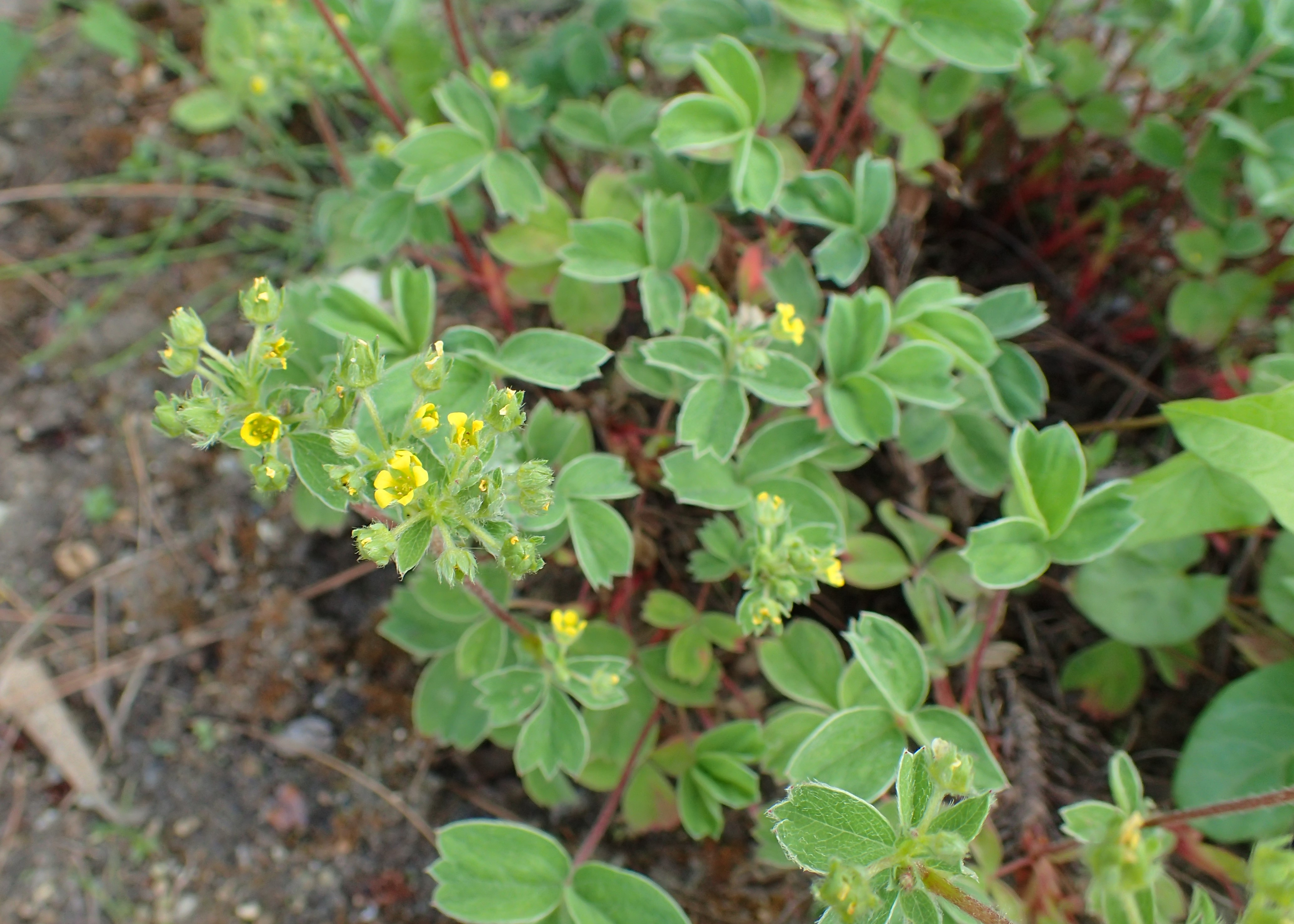
- At the Berlin Botanical Garden and Botanical Museum
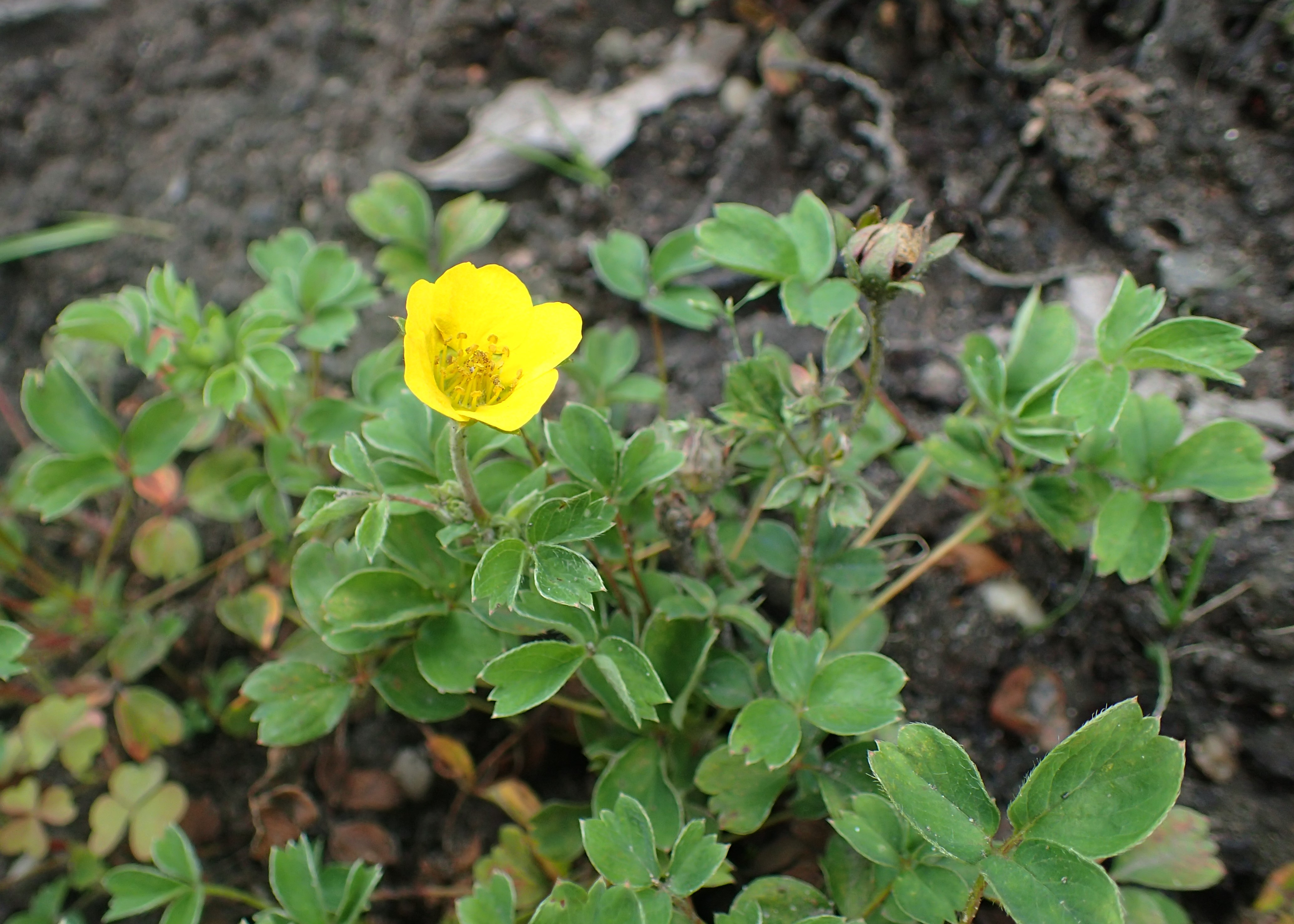
- Specimens called Potentilla cuneata have larger flowers.

Scientific classification
- Kingdom: Plantae
- Clade: Tracheophytes
- Clade: Angiosperms
- Clade: Eudicots
- Clade: Rosids
- Order: Rosales
- Family: Rosaceae
- Genus: Sibbaldia
- Species: S. cuneata

Binomial name
- Sibbaldia cuneata Edgew.

Synonyms
- List: Potentilla cuneata Wall. ex Lehm.; Sibbaldia cuneata var. micrantha (Hook.f.) R.R.Stewart; Sibbaldia maxima Kesselr. ex Murav.; Sibbaldia parviflora var. micrantha (Hook.f.) Dikshit & Panigrahi; Sibbaldia taiwanensis C.L.Li

= Sibbaldia cuneata =

Species of flowering plant

Sibbaldia cuneata, the cuneate cinquefoil or five finger cinquefoil, is a species of flowering plant in the family Rosaceae, native to Afghanistan, Pakistan, the Himalaya, China, and Taiwan. As its synonym Potentilla cuneata it has gained the Royal Horticultural Society's Award of Garden Merit.
