= List of ochotonids =

Species in mammal family Ochotonidae

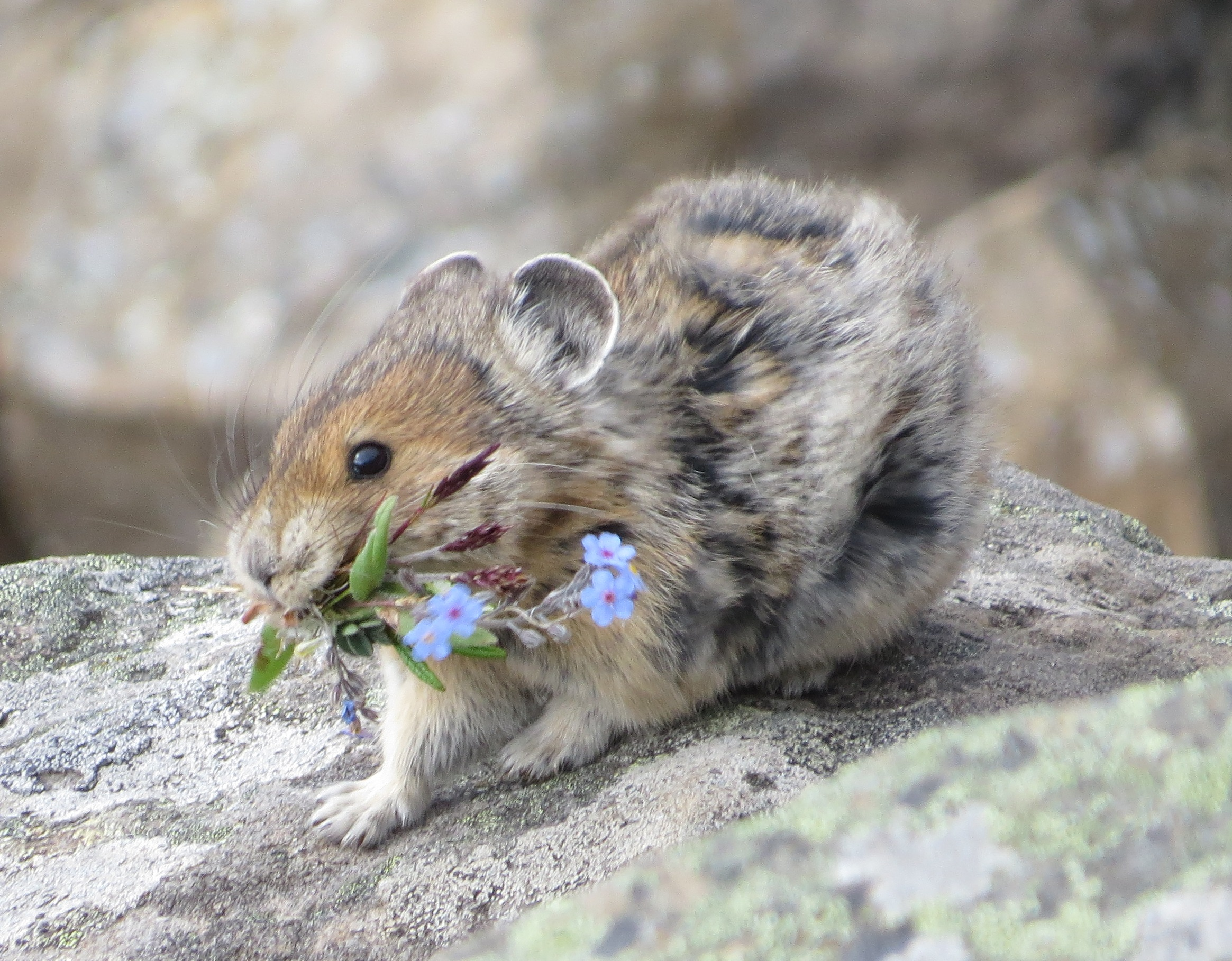
American pika (Ochotona princeps)

Ochotonidae is a family of small mammals in the order Lagomorpha. A member of this family is called an ochotonid or, colloquially, a pika. They are widespread throughout Asia and western North America, and are generally found in grassland, shrubland, and rocky biomes. Pikas are all roughly the same shape and size, with no tails, ranging from the 11 cm (4 in) long Gansu pika to the 29 cm (11 in) long northern pika. No species have population estimates and many have not yet had their conservation status evaluated, though the Helan Shan pika, Hoffmann's pika, Ili pika, and Koslov's pika are considered endangered.

The 29 extant species of Ochotonidae are contained within a single genus, Ochotona, though that genus is sometimes split into four subgenera: Alienauroa, Conothoa (mountain pikas), Ochotona (shrub-steppe pikas), and Pika (northern pikas). Many extinct Ochotonidae species have been discovered, though due to ongoing research and discoveries the exact number and categorization is not fixed.

== Conventions ==
IUCN Red List categories
Conservation status
- EX: Extinct (0 species)
- EW: Extinct in the wild (0 species)
- CR: Critically endangered (0 species)
- EN: Endangered (4 species)
- VU: Vulnerable (0 species)
- NT: Near threatened (0 species)
- LC: Least concern (24 species)

Other categories
- DD: Data deficient (1 species)
- NE: Not evaluated (0 species)

The author citation for the species or genus is given after the scientific name; parentheses around the author citation indicate that this was not the original taxonomic placement. Conservation status codes listed follow the International Union for Conservation of Nature (IUCN) Red List of Threatened Species. Range maps are provided wherever possible; if a range map is not available, a description of the ochotonid's range is provided. Ranges are based on the IUCN Red List for that species unless otherwise noted. All extinct species or subspecies listed alongside extant species went extinct after 1500 CE, and are indicated by a dagger symbol "†".

== Classification ==
The family Ochotonidae consists of twenty-nine extant species in one genus which are divided into dozens of extant subspecies. This does not include hybrid species or extinct prehistoric species.

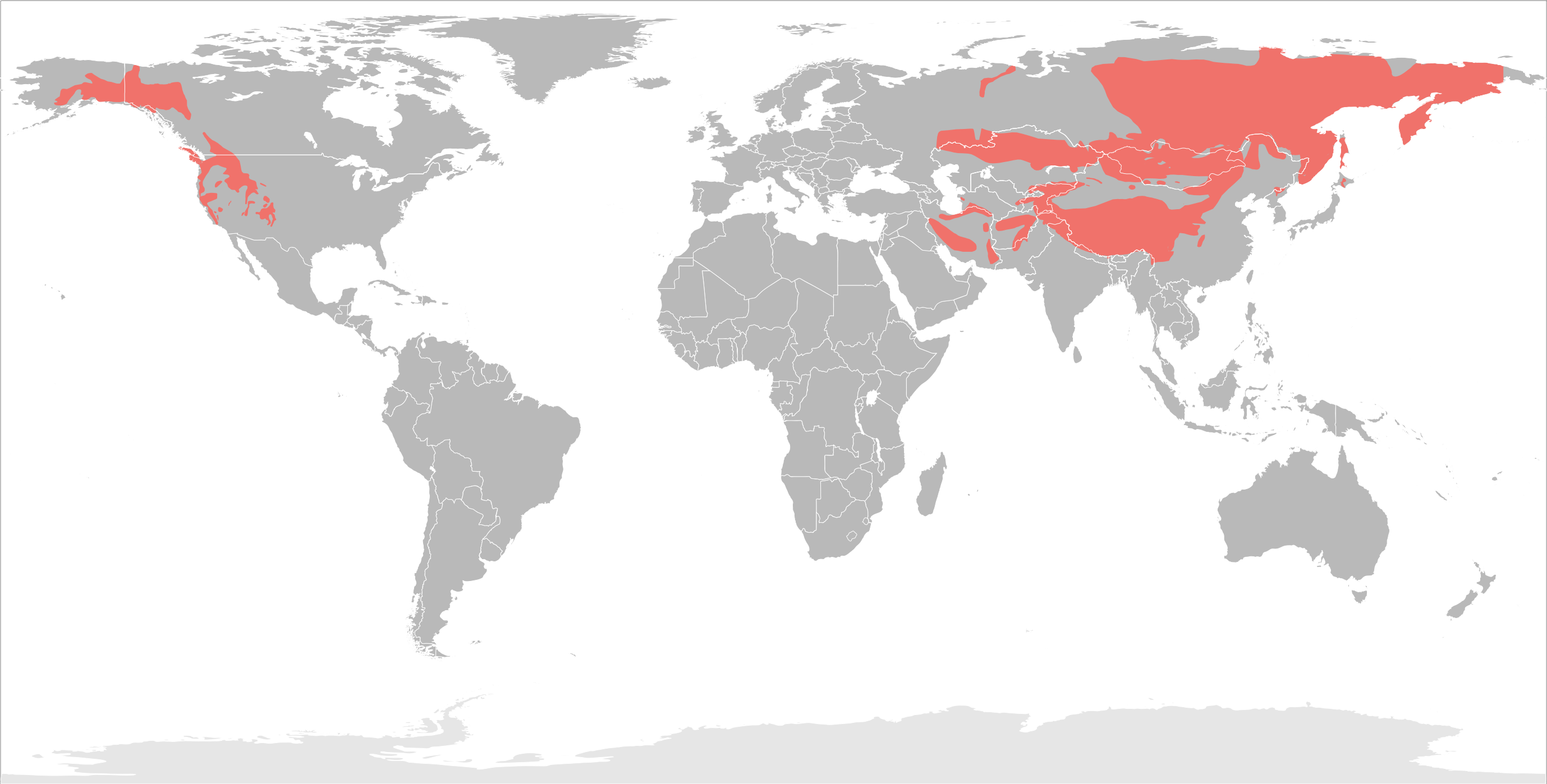
Ochotonidae distribution

== Ochotonids ==
The following classification is based on the taxonomy described by Mammal Species of the World (2005), with augmentation by generally accepted proposals made since using molecular phylogenetic analysis, as supported by both the IUCN and the American Society of Mammalogists.

Genus Ochotona – Link, 1795 – 29 species
Common name	Scientific name and subspecies	Range	Size and ecology	IUCN status and estimated population
Afghan pika	O. rufescens (Gray, 1842) Three subspecies: O. r. regina; O. r. rufescens; O. r. shukurovoi	Central Asia	Size: 15–24 cm (6–9 in) long Habitat: Forest, shrubland, and desert Diet: Herbs and shrubs	LC Unknown
Alpine pika	O. alpina (Pallas, 1773) Four subspecies: O. a. alpina; O. a. changaica; O. a. cinereofusca; O. a. sushkini	Northeastern Asia	Size: 15–26 cm (6–10 in) long Habitat: Rocky areas Diet: Variety of plants	LC Unknown
American pika	O. princeps (Richardson, 1828) Five subspecies: O. p. figginsi; O. p. princeps; O. p. saxatilis; O. p. schisticeps; O. p. taylori	Western North America	Size: 15–22 cm (6–9 in) long Habitat: Rocky areas Diet: Sedges, grass, forbs, and shrubs	LC Unknown
Chinese red pika	O. erythrotis (Büchner, 1890)	Central China	Size: 18–19 cm (7–7 in) long Habitat: Rocky areas Diet: Variety of plants	LC Unknown
Collared pika	O. collaris (Nelson, 1893)	Northwestern North America	Size: 14–21 cm (6–8 in) long Habitat: Rocky areas Diet: Variety of plants, as well as bird brains	LC Unknown
Daurian pika	O. dauurica (Pallas, 1776) Four subspecies: O. d. annectens; O. d. bedfordi; O. d. dauurica; O. d. mursavi	Northeastern Asia	Size: 17–22 cm (7–9 in) long Habitat: Grassland Diet: Shrubs, grass, legumes, and flowers	LC Unknown
Forrest's pika	O. forresti Thomas, 1923	Southeastern Asia	Size: 15–19 cm (6–7 in) long Habitat: Forest and shrubland Diet: Variety of plants	LC Unknown
Gansu pika	O. cansus Lyon, 1907 Four subspecies: O. c. cansus; O. c. morosa; O. c. sorella; O. c. stevensi	Central China	Size: 11–17 cm (4–7 in) long Habitat: Shrubland and grassland Diet: Shrubs and other plants	LC Unknown
Glover's pika	O. gloveri Thomas, 1922 Three subspecies: O. g. brookei; O. g. calloceps; O. g. gloveri	Central China	Size: 16–25 cm (6–10 in) long Habitat: Rocky areas Diet: Forbs, sedge, and grass	LC Unknown
Helan Shan pika	O. argentata Howell, 1928	Central China	Size: 20–24 cm (8–9 in) long Habitat: Rocky areas Diet: Variety of plants	EN Unknown
Hoffmann's pika	O. hoffmanni Formozov, Yakhontov, Dmitriev, 1996	Northern Mongolia	Size: 19–21 cm (7–8 in) long Habitat: Rocky areas Diet: Variety of plants	EN Unknown
Ili pika	O. iliensis Li, Ma, 1986	Western China	Size: 20–21 cm (8–8 in) long Habitat: Rocky areas Diet: Herbs and shrubs	EN Unknown
Kazakh pika	O. opaca Argiropulo, 1930	Central Asia	Size: 17–22 cm (7–9 in) long Habitat: Grassland and rocky areas Diet: Shrubs, herbs, and grass	LC Unknown
Korean pika	O. coreana Allen, Andrews, 1913	North Korea and southeastern China	Size: 16–21 cm (6–8 in) long Habitat: Rocky areas Diet: Herbs, shrubs, forbs, fungi, berries, seeds, and lichen	DD Unknown
Koslov's pika	O. koslowi (Büchner, 1894)	Western China	Size: 22–24 cm (9–9 in) long Habitat: Grassland Diet: Sedges and other plants	EN Unknown
Ladak pika	O. ladacensis (Günther, 1875)	Western China and northern India and Pakistan	Size: 18–25 cm (7–10 in) long Habitat: Grassland Diet: Shrubs, flowers, and roots	LC Unknown
Large-eared pika	O. macrotis (Günther, 1875) Five subspecies: O. m. auritus; O. m. chinensis; O. m. macrotis; O. m. sacana; O. m. wollastoni	Central Asia and central China	Size: 15–20 cm (6–8 in) long Habitat: Rocky areas Diet: Grass, legumes, sedges, herbs, berries, twigs, moss, and lichen	LC Unknown
Manchurian pika	O. mantchurica Thomas, 1909	Northeastern China	Size: 13–22 cm (5–9 in) long Habitat: Forest, shrubland, and rocky areas Diet: Variety of plants	LC Unknown
Moupin pika	O. thibetana (Milne-Edwards, 1871) Five subspecies: O. t. nangqenica; O. t. osgoodi; O. t. sacraria (Sacred pika); O. t. sikimaria (Sikkim pika); O. t. thibetana	Central China	Size: 14–18 cm (6–7 in) long Habitat: Forest and shrubland Diet: Variety of plants	LC Unknown
Northern pika	O. hyperborea (Pallas, 1811) Seven subspecies: O. h. cinereoflava; O. h. ferruginea; O. h. hyperborea; O. h. normalis; O. h. uralensis; O. h. yesoensis; O. h. yoshikurai	Northeastern Asia	Size: 13–29 cm (5–11 in) long Habitat: Forest, shrubland, and rocky areas Diet: Herbs, shrubs, forbs, fungi, berries, seeds, and lichen	LC Unknown
Nubra pika	O. nubrica Thomas, 1922 Two subspecies: O. n. lhasaensis; O. n. nubrica	South Asia	Size: 14–19 cm (6–7 in) long Habitat: Shrubland and grassland Diet: Variety of plants	LC Unknown
Pallas's pika	O. pallasi (Gray, 1867) Four subspecies: O. p. hamica; O. p. pallasi; O. p. pricei; O. p. sunidica	Central and Eastern Asia	Size: 19–23 cm (7–9 in) long Habitat: Grassland and rocky areas Diet: Grass and herbs	LC Unknown
Plateau pika	O. curzoniae (Hodgson, 1858)	Western China and Northern India	Size: 16–21 cm (6–8 in) long Habitat: Grassland and desert Diet: Variety of plants	LC Unknown
Royle's pika	O. roylei (Ogilby, 1839) Two subspecies: O. r. himalayana (Himalayan pika); O. r. nepalensis; O. r. roylei; O. r. wardi	Western China and Northern India	Size: 13–21 cm (5–8 in) long Habitat: Rocky areas Diet: Forbs, as well as other plants	LC Unknown
Steppe pika	O. pusilla (Pallas, 1769) Two subspecies: O. p. angustifrons; O. p. pusilla	Central Asia	Size: 15–21 cm (6–8 in) long Habitat: Shrubland and grassland Diet: Grass and above-ground vegetation	LC Unknown
Thomas's pika	O. thomasi Argiropulo, 1948	Central China	Size: 13–16 cm (5–6 in) long Habitat: Shrubland and grassland Diet: Variety of plants	LC Unknown
Tsing-ling pika	O. syrinx Matschie, 1908	Central China	Size: 13–18 cm (5–7 in) long Habitat: Forest and shrubland Diet: Variety of plants	LC Unknown
Turkestan red pika	O. rutila (Sévertsov, 1873)	Central Asia	Size: 18–26 cm (7–10 in) long Habitat: Rocky areas Diet: Grass and other plants	LC Unknown
Turuchan pika	O. turuchanensis Naumov, 1934	Central Russia	Size: 15–22 cm (6–9 in) long Habitat: Rocky areas Diet: Variety of plants	LC Unknown

== Sources ==
- Smith, Andrew T.; Johnston, Charlotte H.; Alves, Paolo C.; Hackländer, Klaus, eds. (2018). Lagomorphs: Pikas, Rabbits, and Hares of the World. Johns Hopkins University Press. ISBN 978-1-4214-2340-1.
- Hoffmann, Robert S.; Smith, Andrew T. (2005). Wilson, Don E.; Reeder, DeeAnn M. (eds.). Mammal Species of the World. Vol. 1 (3rd ed.). Johns Hopkins University Press. ISBN 978-0-8018-8221-0.
