= List of lagomorphs =

Animals in mammal order Lagomorpha

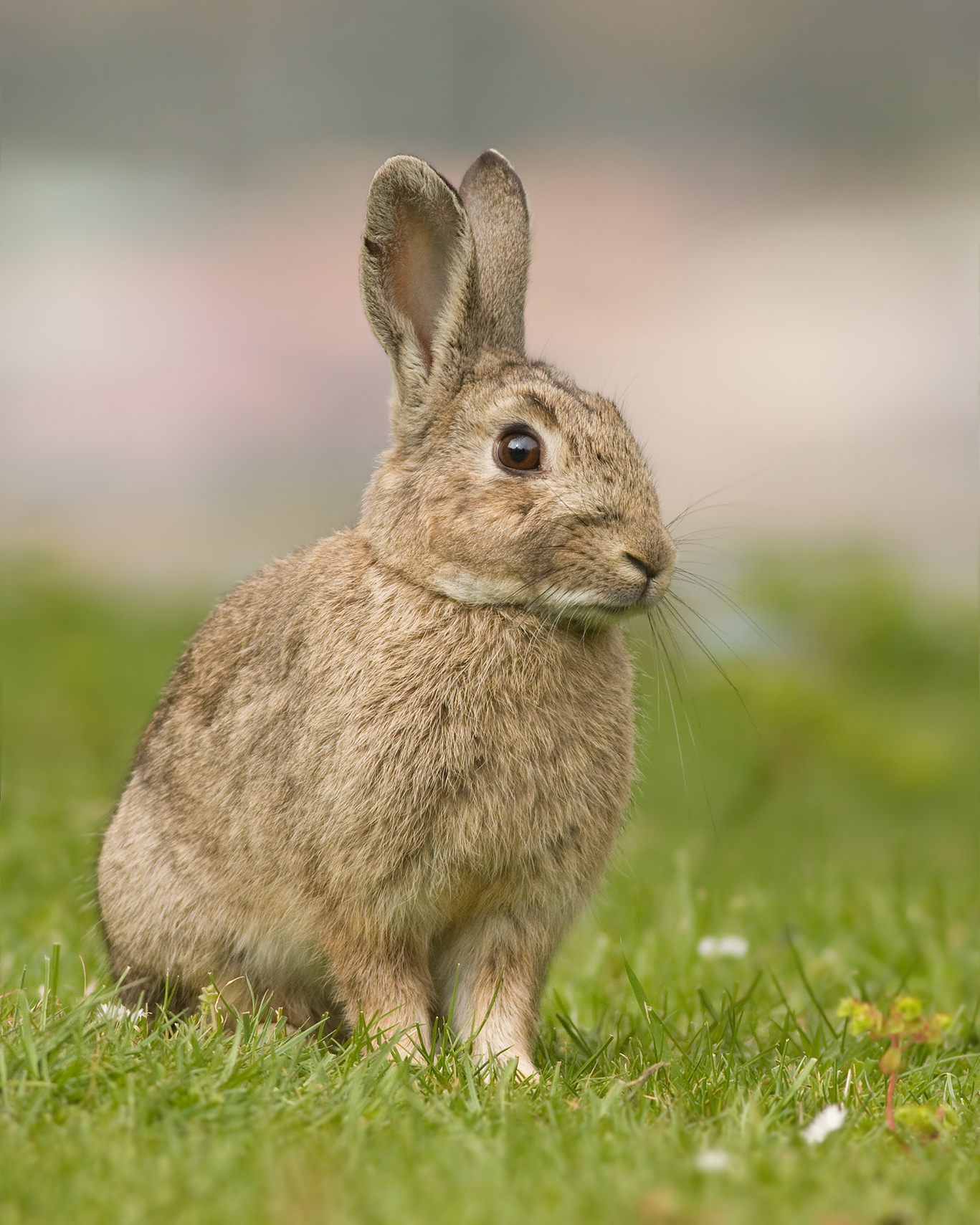
European rabbit (Oryctolagus cuniculus)

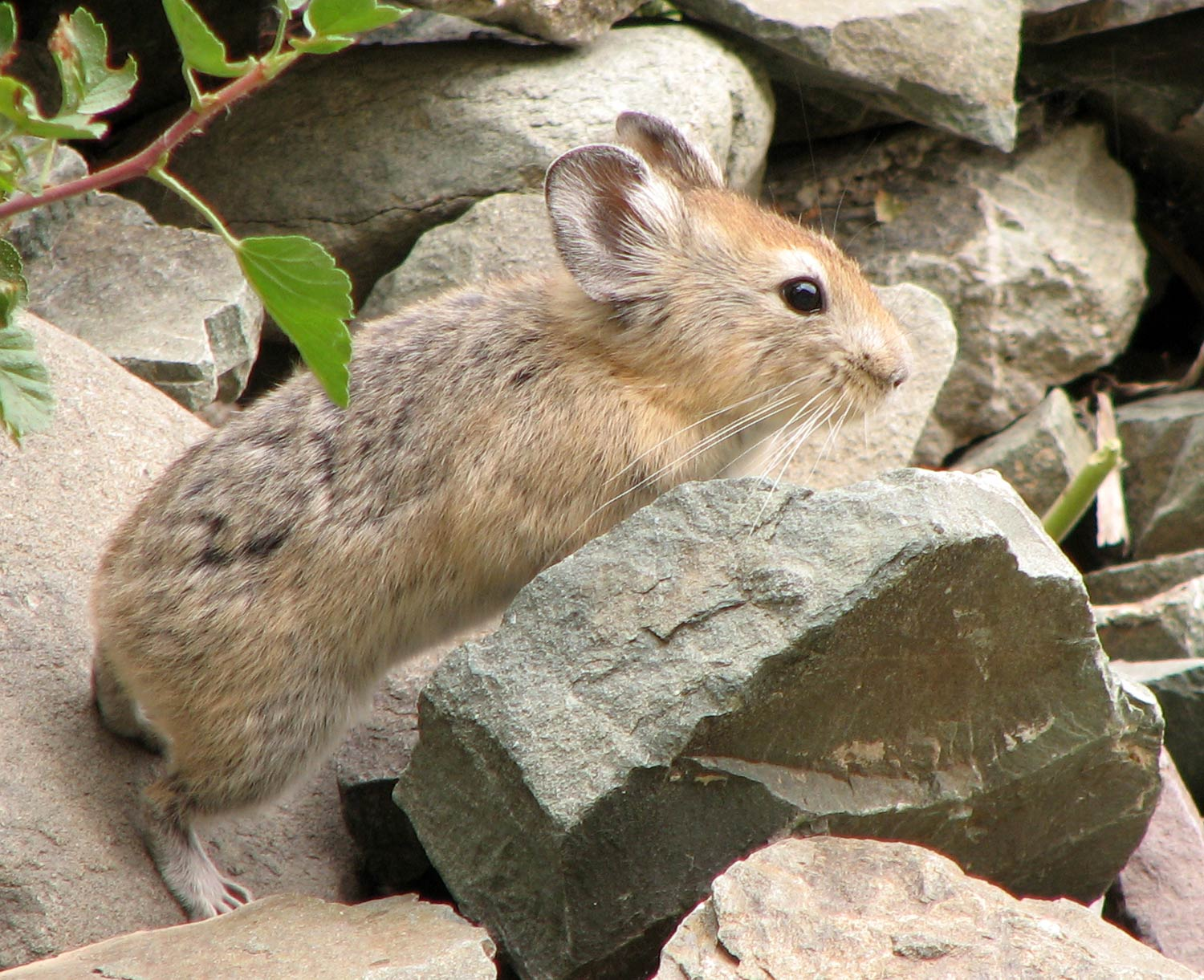
Large-eared pika (Ochotona macrotis)

Lagomorpha is an order of placental mammals, comprising the rabbits, hares, and pikas. Members of this order are called lagomorphs. It currently comprises 93 extant species, which are grouped into 12 genera. Lagomorphs live on every major landmass except Antarctica, and in a variety of habitats, especially forests, grasslands, shrublands, and rocky areas. They are generally small in size and come in two main groupings of body plans, the larger rabbit group and smaller pika group, ranging overall from the 11 cm (4 in) long Gansu pika to the 76 cm (30 in) long desert hare. The domestic rabbit subspecies of the European rabbit has been domesticated, resulting in a worldwide distribution.

Lagomorpha is divided into two families: Leporidae, comprising the rabbits and hares; and Ochotonidae, or the pikas. The 64 extant species of Leporidae are divided into 11 genera, though the majority of the species are placed into Sylvilagus (cottontail rabbits) and Lepus (hares); the 29 extant species of Ochotonidae are grouped into a single genus, Ochotona. The exact organization of the species is not fixed, with many recent proposals made based on molecular phylogenetic analysis. No lagomorph species have recently gone extinct, though some species are endangered and the riverine rabbit is critically endangered.

== Conventions ==
The author citation for the species or genus is given after the scientific name; parentheses around the author citation indicate that this was not the original taxonomic placement. Range maps are provided wherever possible; if a range map is not available, a description of the collective range of species in that genera is provided. Ranges are based on the International Union for Conservation of Nature (IUCN) Red List of Threatened Species unless otherwise noted. All extinct genera or species listed alongside extant species went extinct after 1500 CE, and are indicated by a dagger symbol "†".

== Classification ==
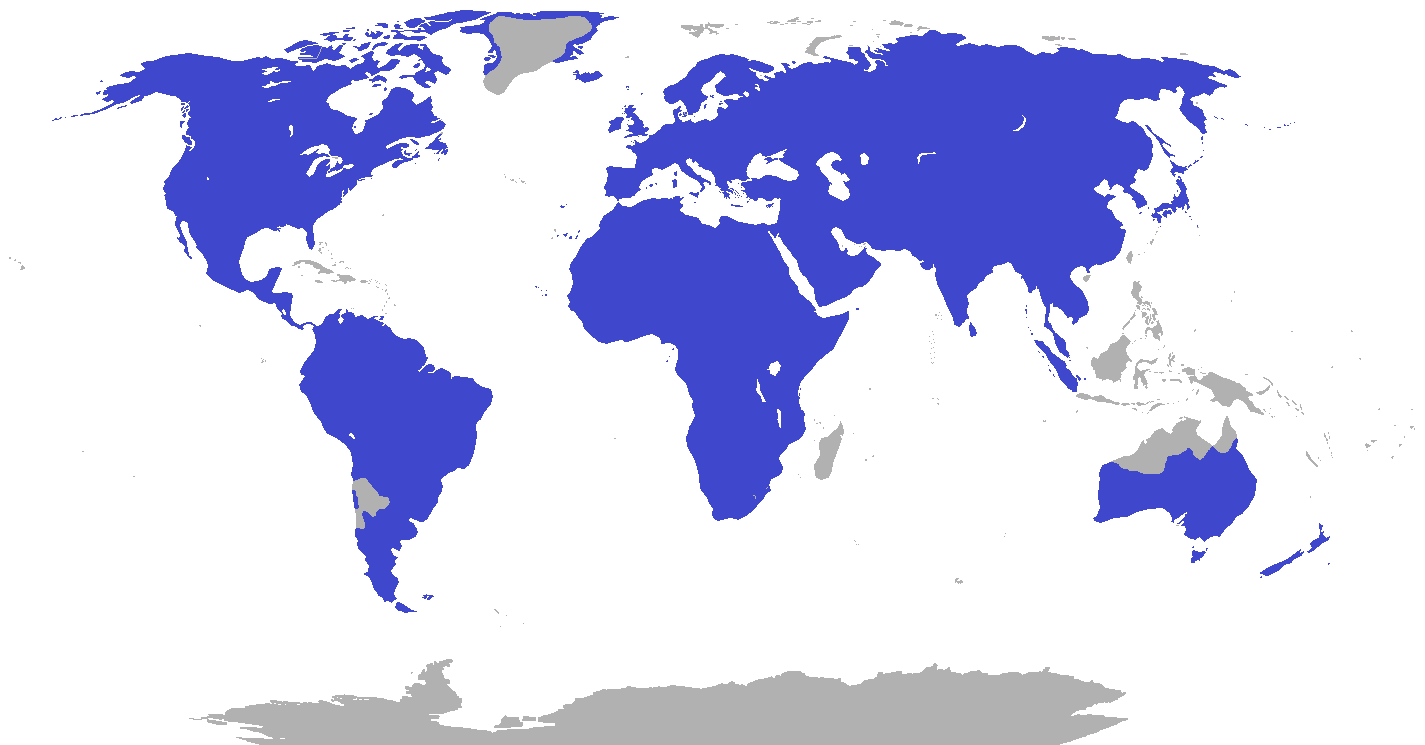
Lagomorpha/Leporidae range

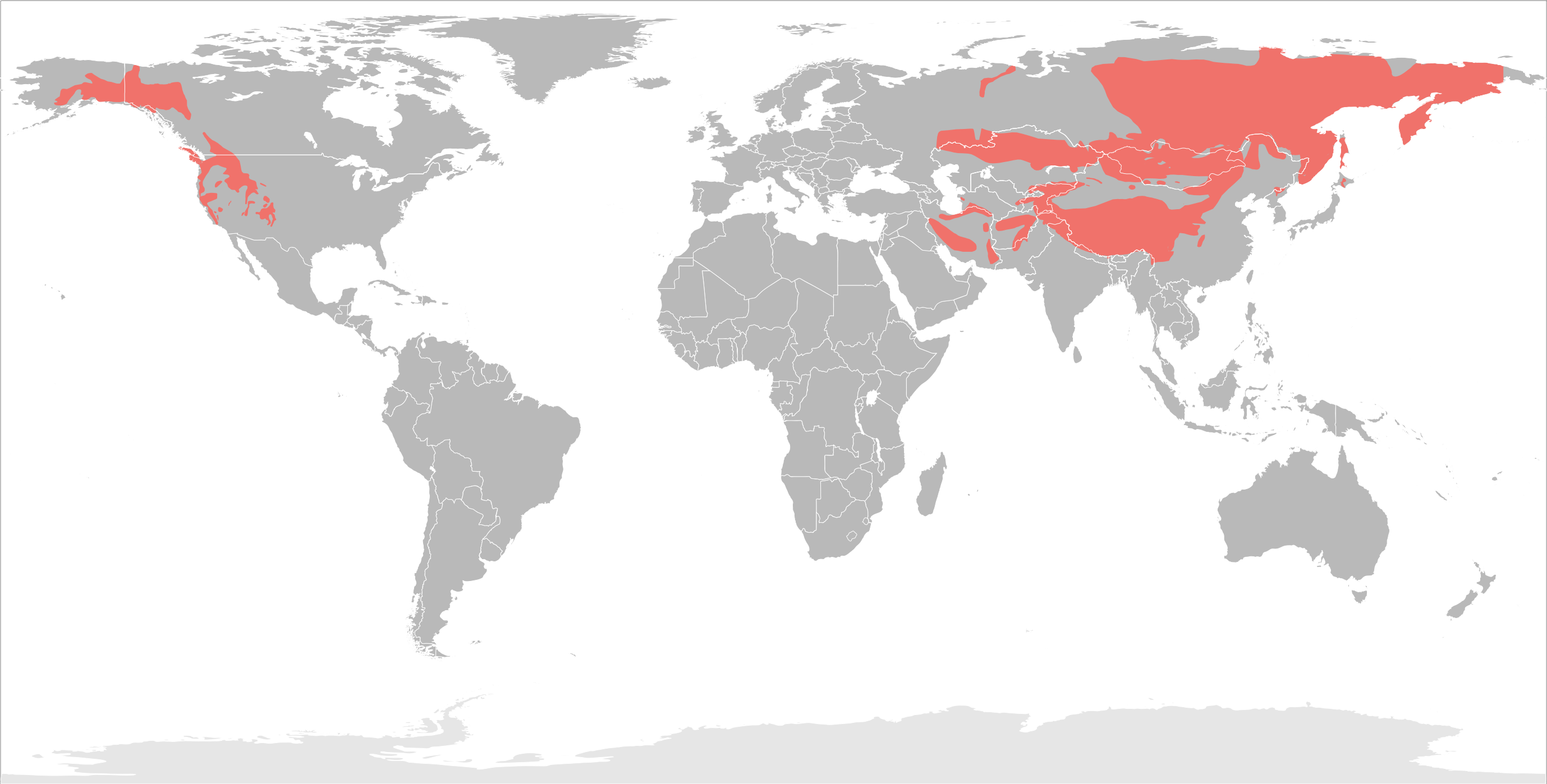
Ochotonidae range

The order Lagomorpha consists of 93 extant species belonging to 12 genera. This does not include hybrid species or extinct prehistoric species. Modern molecular studies indicate that the 12 genera can be grouped into 2 families.

Family Leporidae

- Genus Brachylagus (pygmy rabbit): one species
- Genus Bunolagus (riverine rabbit): one species
- Genus Caprolagus (hispid hare): one species
- Genus Lepus (hares): 32 species
- Genus Nesolagus (striped rabbits): two species
- Genus Oryctolagus (European rabbit): one species
- Genus Pentalagus (Amami rabbit): one species
- Genus Poelagus (Bunyoro rabbit): one species
- Genus Pronolagus (red rock hares): four species
- Genus Romerolagus (volcano rabbit): one species
- Genus Sylvilagus (cottontail rabbits): 19 species

Family Ochotonidae

- Genus Ochotona (pikas): 29 species

- Lagomorpha
  - - Leporidae
      - - Nesolagus
        - - Poelagus
          - Pronolagus
      - - Romerolagus
        - - - - - Sylvilagus
                - Brachylagus
              - - - Caprolagus
                  - Oryctolagus
                - - Bunolagus
                  - Pentalagus
          - Lepus
  - - Ochotonidae
      - Ochotona

== Lagomorphs ==
The following classification is based on the taxonomy described by the reference work Mammal Species of the World (2005), with augmentation by generally accepted proposals made since using molecular phylogenetic analysis, as supported by both the IUCN and the American Society of Mammalogists.

=== Family Leporidae ===
Members of the Leporidae family are called leporids, or colloquially rabbits and hares. Leporidae comprises 73 extant species, divided into 11 genera.

Not assigned to a named subfamily – eleven genera
Name	Authority and species	Range	Size and ecology
Brachylagus	Miller, 1900 One species: B. idahoensis (Pygmy rabbit)	Western America (introduced in red)	Size: 23–30 cm (9–12 in) long, plus 1–3 cm (0.4–1.2 in) tail Habitats: Shrubland and desert Diet: Sagebrush, as well as grass and other plants
Bunolagus	Thomas, 1929 One species: B. monticularis (Riverine rabbit)	Southern South Africa	Size: 33–47 cm (13–19 in) long, plus 7–11 cm (3–4 in) tail Habitat: Shrubland Diet: Shrubs as well as grass
Caprolagus	Blyth, 1845 One species: C. hispidus (Hispid hare)	Himalayas	Size: 38–50 cm (15–20 in) long, plus 2–4 cm (1–2 in) tail Habitats: Grassland and inland wetlands Diet: Grass as well as other plants
Lepus (hare)	Linnaeus, 1758 32 species: L. alleni (Antelope jackrabbit); L. americanus (Snowshoe hare); L. arcticus (Arctic hare); L. brachyurus (Japanese hare); L. californicus (Black-tailed jackrabbit); L. callotis (White-sided jackrabbit); L. capensis (Cape hare); L. castroviejoi (Broom hare); L. comus (Yunnan hare); L. coreanus (Korean hare); L. corsicanus (Corsican hare); L. europaeus (European hare, pictured); L. fagani (Ethiopian hare); L. flavigularis (Tehuantepec jackrabbit); L. granatensis (Granada hare); L. habessinicus (Abyssinian hare); L. hainanus (Hainan hare); L. insularis (Black jackrabbit); L. mandshuricus (Manchurian hare); L. nigricollis (Indian hare); L. oiostolus (Woolly hare); L. othus (Alaskan hare); L. peguensis (Burmese hare); L. saxatilis (Scrub hare); L. sinensis (Chinese hare); L. starcki (Ethiopian highland hare); L. tibetanus (Desert hare); L. timidus (Mountain hare); L. tolai (Tolai hare); L. townsendii (White-tailed jackrabbit); L. victoriae (African savanna hare); L. yarkandensis (Yarkand hare)	Worldwide	Size range: 28 cm (11 in) long, plus 5 cm (2 in) tail (Yarkand hare) to 76 cm (30 in) long (Desert hare) Habitats: Desert, coastal marine, inland wetlands, forest, shrubland, rocky areas, savanna, caves, and grassland Diets: Wide variety of plants
Nesolagus (striped rabbit)	Major, 1899 Two species: N. netscheri (Sumatran striped rabbit, pictured); N. timminsi (Annamite striped rabbit)	Sumatra and the Annamite Range in Laos and Vietnam	Size range: 35 cm (14 in) long (Annamite striped rabbit) to 42 cm (17 in) long plus 17 cm (7 in) tail (Sumatran striped rabbit) Habitat: Forest Diets: Various plants
Oryctolagus	Lilljeborg, 1762 One species: O. cuniculus (European rabbit)	Europe, southern South America, and Oceana (native in red, introduced in blue)	Size: 38–50 cm (15–20 in) long Habitats: Forest, savanna, shrubland, and grassland Diet: Grass, leaves, buds, bark, and roots
Pentalagus	Lyon, 1904 One species: P. furnessi (Amami rabbit)	Southern tip of Japan	Size: 39–53 cm (15–21 in) long, plus 2–4 cm (1–2 in) tail Habitats: Forest, shrubland, and intertidal marine Diet: Herbs, shrubs, and acorns
Poelagus	St. Leger, 1932 One species: P. marjorita (Bunyoro rabbit)	Central Africa (native range in green, uncertain presence in orange)	Size: 45–50 cm (18–20 in) long, plus 4–5 cm (1.6–2.0 in) tail Habitats: Forest, savanna, and rocky areas Diet: Grass, shrubs, forbs, and tubers
Pronolagus (red rock hare)	Lyon, 1904 Four species: P. crassicaudatus (Natal red rock hare); P. randensis (Jameson's red rock hare, pictured); P. rupestris (Smith's red rock hare); P. saundersiae (Hewitt's red rock hare)	Southern Africa (P. crassicaudatus in purple, P. randensis in green, P. rupestris in orange, and P. saundersiae in blue)	Size range: 38 cm (15 in) long, plus 5 cm (2 in) tail (Hewitt's red rock hare) to 56 cm (22 in) long plus 11 cm (4 in) tail (Natal red rock hare) Habitats: Desert, grassland, shrubland, and rocky areas Diets: Grass, herbs, and shrubs
Romerolagus	Merriam, 1896 One species: R. diazi (Volcano rabbit)	Southern Mexico	Size: 27–32 cm (11–13 in) long, plus 1–4 cm (0.4–1.6 in) tail Habitats: Forest and grassland Diet: Grass
Sylvilagus (cottontail rabbit)	Gray, 1867 19 species: S. andinus (Andean tapeti); S. aquaticus (Swamp rabbit); S. audubonii (Desert cottontail, pictured); S. bachmani (Brush rabbit); S. brasiliensis (Common tapeti); S. cunicularius (Mexican cottontail); S. dicei (Dice's cottontail); S. floridanus (Eastern cottontail); S. gabbi (Central American tapeti); S. graysoni (Tres Marias cottontail); S. insonus (Omilteme cottontail); S. nuttallii (Mountain cottontail); S. obscurus (Appalachian cottontail); S. palustris (Marsh rabbit); S. robustus (Davis Mountains cottontail); S. sanctaemartae (Santa Marta tapeti); S. tapetillus (Coastal tapeti); S. transitionalis (New England cottontail); S. varynaensis (Venezuelan lowland rabbit)	North America and South America	Size range: 21 cm (8 in) long, plus 1 cm (0.4 in) tail (Tres Marias cottontail) to 55 cm (22 in) long plus 8 cm (3 in) tail (Swamp rabbit) Habitats: Desert, inland wetlands, intertidal marine, forest, shrubland, rocky areas, savanna, and grassland Diets: Wide variety of plants

=== Family Ochotonidae ===
Members of the Ochotonidae family are called ochotonids, or colloquially pikas. Ochotonidae comprises 34 extant species, which are all contained within a single genus.

Not assigned to a named subfamily – one genus
Name	Authority and species	Range	Size and ecology
Ochotona (pika)	Link, 1795 29 species: O. alpina (Alpine pika); O. argentata (Helan Shan pika); O. cansus (Gansu pika); O. collaris (Collared pika); O. coreana (Korean pika); O. curzoniae (Plateau pika); O. dauurica (Daurian pika); O. erythrotis (Chinese red pika); O. forresti (Forrest's pika); O. gloveri (Glover's pika); O. hoffmanni (Hoffmann's pika); O. hyperborea (Northern pika); O. iliensis (Ili pika); O. koslowi (Koslov's pika); O. ladacensis (Ladak pika); O. macrotis (Large-eared pika); O. mantchurica (Manchurian pika); O. nubrica (Nubra pika); O. opaca (Kazakh pika); O. pallasi (Pallas's pika); O. princeps (American pika, pictured); O. pusilla (Steppe pika); O. roylei (Royle's pika); O. rufescens (Afghan pika); O. rutila (Turkestan red pika); O. syrinx (Tsing-ling pika); O. thibetana (Moupin pika); O. thomasi (Thomas's pika); O. turuchanensis (Turuchan pika)	Asia and western North America	Size range: 11 cm (4 in) long (Gansu pika) to 29 cm (11 in) long (Northern pika) Habitats: Desert, forest, shrubland, rocky areas, and grassland Diets: Wide variety of plants

== Sources ==
- Feldhamer, George A.; Thompson, Bruce Carlyle; Chapman, Joseph A. (2003). Wild Mammals of North America. Johns Hopkins University Press. ISBN 978-0-8018-7416-1.
- Kingdon, Jonathan (2015). The Kingdon Field Guide to African Mammals (Second ed.). Bloomsbury Publishing. ISBN 978-1-4729-2531-2.
- Kurta, Allen (1995). Mammals of the Great Lakes Region. University of Michigan Press. ISBN 978-0-472-06497-7.
- Smith, Andrew T.; Johnston, Charlotte H.; Alves, Paolo C.; Hackländer, Klaus, eds. (2018). Lagomorphs: Pikas, Rabbits, and Hares of the World. Johns Hopkins University Press. ISBN 978-1-4214-2340-1.
- Smith, Andrew T.; Xie, Yan; Hoffmann, Robert S.; Lunde, Darrin; MacKinnon, John; Wilson, Don E.; Wozencraft, W. Chris, eds. (2010). A Guide to the Mammals of China. Princeton University Press. ISBN 978-1-4008-3411-2.
- Verts, B. J.; Carraway, Leslie N. (1998). Land Mammals of Oregon. University of California Press. ISBN 978-0-520-21199-5.
- Hoffmann, Robert S.; Smith, Andrew T. (2005). Wilson, Don E.; Reeder, DeeAnn M. (eds.). Mammal Species of the World. Vol. 1 (3rd ed.). Johns Hopkins University Press. ISBN 978-0-8018-8221-0.
