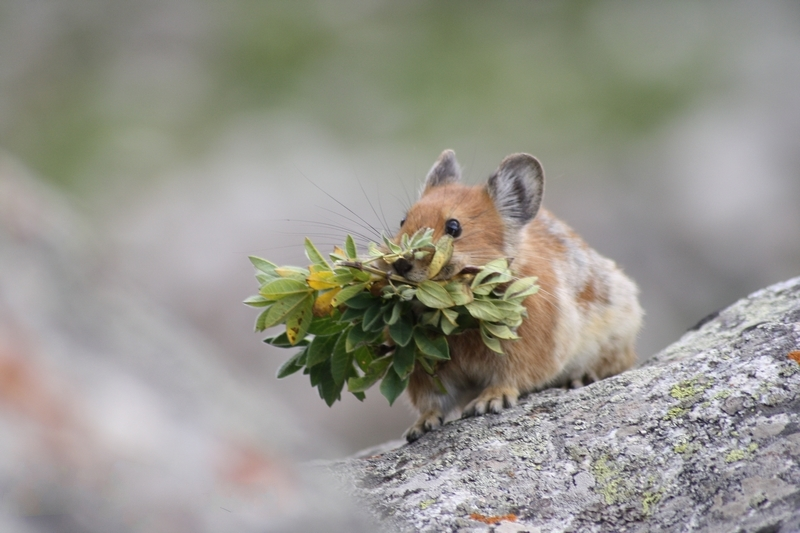

Conservation status
- Least Concern (IUCN 3.1)

Scientific classification
- Kingdom: Animalia
- Phylum: Chordata
- Class: Mammalia
- Order: Lagomorpha
- Family: Ochotonidae
- Genus: Ochotona
- Species: O. rutila

Binomial name
- Ochotona rutila (Severtzov, 1873)
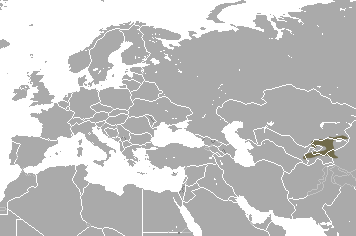
- Turkestan red pika range

= Turkestan red pika =

Species of mammal

The Turkestani red pika (Ochotona rutila) is a species of mammal in the family Ochotonidae. The summer fur at its back is bright rufous and the ventral fur is white or ochraceous. The winter dorsal fur is pale brown and the ventral fur is white or light ochraceous in colour. It is found in the mountains of western Xinjiang in China, and sporadically also in the central Asian mountains in Kazakhstan, Kyrgyzstan, Tajikistan, and Uzbekistan. The female has a low fertility rate, and gives birth to offspring during the breeding season from spring to summer. She generally produces two litters each year, with two to six young. It is rated as a species of least concern on the International Union for Conservation of Nature Red List of Endangered Species, but it is considered to be near-threatened within the China part of its range.

== Taxonomy ==
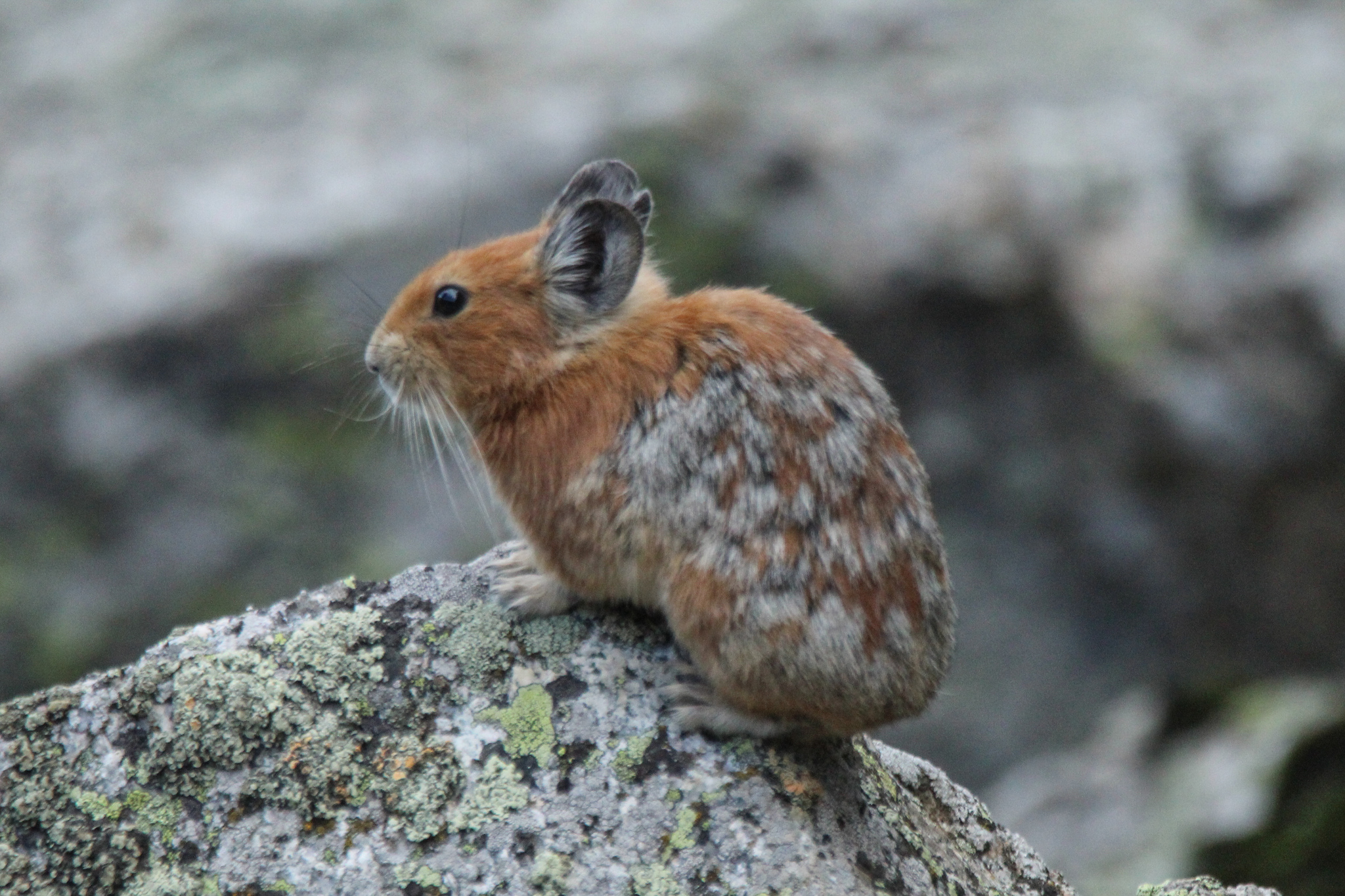
In Kazakhstan

The Turkestan red pika is one of the 29 recognized species of mammal in the family Ochotonidae. (Note: The other 29 species of pika are alpine pika (Ochotona alpina), silver pika (Ochotona argentata), collared pika (Ochotona collaris), Hoffmann's pika (Ochotona hoffmanni), northern pika (Ochotona hyperborea), Pallas's pika (Ochotona pallasi), American pika (Ochotona princeps), Turuchan pika (Ochotona turuchanensis), Gansu pika (Ochotona cansus), plateau pika (Ochotona curzoniae), Daurian pika (Ochotona dauurica), Tsing-ling pika (Ochotona huangensis), Nubra pika (Ochotona nubrica), steppe pika (Ochotona pusilla), Afghan pika (Ochotona rufescens), Moupin pika (Ochotona thibetana), Thomas's pika (Ochotona thomasi), Chinese red pika (Ochotona erythrotis), Forrest's pika (Ochotona forresti), Gaoligong pika (Ochotona gaoligongensis), Glover's pika (Ochotona gloveri), Himalayan pika (Ochotona himalayana), Ili pika (Ochotona iliensis), Koslov's pika (Ochotona koslowi), Ladak pika (Ochotona ladacensis), large-eared pika (Ochotona macrotis), Muli pika (Ochotona muliensis), and Royle's pika (Ochotona roylei).) It was first described by the Russian naturalist Nikolai Alekseevich Severtzov in 1873. In 1951, Ellerman and Morrison-Scott included the Chinese red pika (Ochotona erythrotis) and the Glover's pika (Ochotona gloveri) as subspecies of the Turkestan red pika. Multiple authors (Gureev in 1964; Weston in 1982; Feng and Zheng in 1985; and Feng, Cai, and Zheng in 1988) have since separated them as independent species, based on their colouration, zoogeography (branch of the science of biogeography that is concerned with the present and past geographic distribution of animal species), and skull morphology. The mammalogists Robert S. Hoffmann and Andrew T. Smith listed the Turkestan red pika as a species in the third edition of Mammal Species of the World that was published in 2005. Currently, it has no recognized subspecies.

== Description ==
The Turkestan red pika measures 19.6 to 23 cm (7.7 to 9.1 in) in length, of which 9.5 to 11 cm (3.7 to 4.3 in) is the tail. It weighs 220 to 320 g (7.8 to 11.3 oz). The skull is large, measuring 4.6 to 5.3 cm (1.8 to 2.1 in) in length, and is moderately arched, and has broad and flat interorbital region (region of the skull is located between the eyes, anterior to the upper and back part of the skull). The frontal bone has no alveolus (hollow cavity in bone. Not the same structure as a pulmonary alveolus) above it. The front portion of the nasal cavities are noticeably inflated, and are usually longer than the middle part of the frontal bone. It has 2.7 to 2.9 cm (1.1 to 1.1 in) long ears which have grayish black dorsal sides. The summer dorsal fur is bright rufous, and it is white-spotted at the neck behind the ears, and the spots sometimes form a broad, yellowish white collar. The flanks (sides of the body between the rib cage and the uppermost and largest part of the hip bone) have yellowish cinnamon-buff tinge. The ventral fur is white or ochraceous in colour, but the chest has a rust-red transverse stripe. The winter dorsal fur is pale brown and the ventral fur is white or light ochraceous in colour. The hindfeet are 3.6 to 3.9 cm (1.4 to 1.5 in) long. The anterior palatine foramen (funnel-shaped opening in the bony plate of the skull, located in the roof of the mouth, immediately behind the incisor teeth where blood vessels and nerves pass) and the palatal foramen are combined.

In contrast with most other pikas, the Turkestan red pika is a quiet species, and is also commonly known as the "silent" pika. It has no alarm calls and no song vocalizations. In alarm conditions, it takes cover under rocks and emits a chattering call which is similar to that of the northern pika (Ochotona hyperborea) and two subspecies of the alpine pika, O. a. cinereofusca, and O. a. scorodumovi. Individuals belonging to the same species are alerted by this signal.

== Distribution and habitat ==
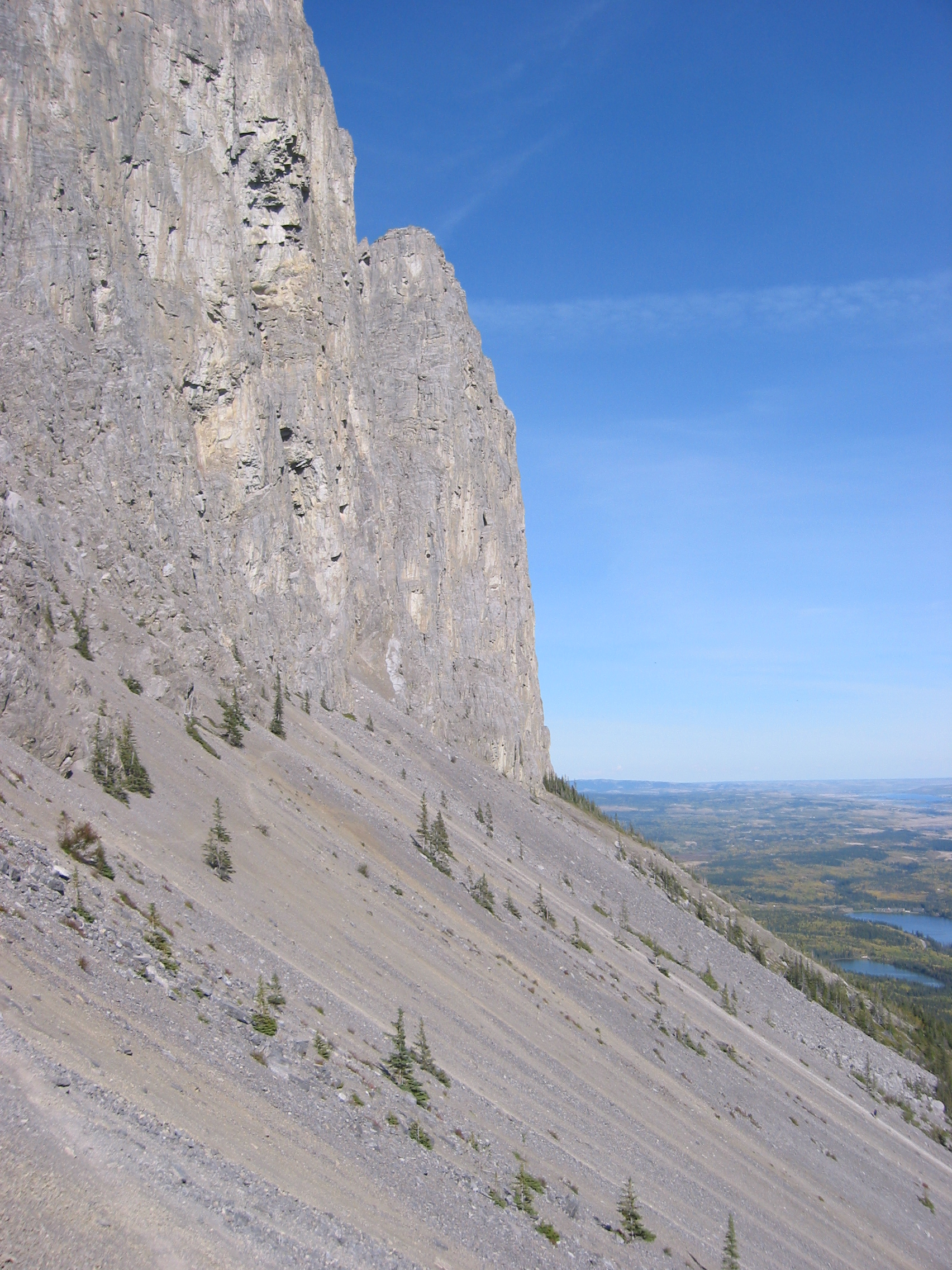
Talus at the bottom of Mount Yamnuska, Alberta, Canada

The region of Turkestan is present in central Asia between the Gobi Desert and the Caspian Sea, and comprises Xinjiang, Kazakhstan, Kyrgyzstan, Tajikistan, Turkmenistan, and Uzbekistan. The Turkestan red pika is found in the mountains in western Xinjiang in China, and sporadically in the central Asian mountains such as the Pamir Mountains in Tajikistan, and the Tien Shan Mountains in southeastern Uzbekistan, Kyrgyzstan, and southeastern Kazakhstan. It is also probably found in northern Afghanistan. It is considered to be commonly found in the Iskanderkul Lake area of Tajikistan, and the Great Alma-Ata Lake area in Kazakhstan. Its range is allopatric with that of the Chinese red pika.

It is a rock-dwelling pika which usually inhabits talus deposits (collection of broken rock pieces at the base of cliffs, volcanoes, or valley shoulders, accumulated due to periodic rockfall from adjacent cliff faces) and takes shelter in large boulders. It is typically found at moderate elevations of less than 3,000 metres (9,800 ft) from sea level, despite the availability of the talus environment.

== Behavior and ecology ==
The Turkestan red pika is a diurnal species, and is more active at dusk than at dawn. It lives in families consisting of the adult male, adult female and, during the reproductive season, their young. The population levels tend to remain constant each year. It has a low population density of 12 to 20 individuals, or 3 to 3.5 families, per hectare. Adjacent family territory centres are generally separated by 50 to 100 m (160 to 330 ft), but can be as close as 20 to 30 m (66 to 98 ft). Like other pika species, it is a generalist herbivore, and stores vegetation in the form of hayplies (piles of grass, legumes, or other herbaceous plants that serve as animal fodder). However, unlike most other pikas, it does not feed in open meadows, but in an area of within 2 metres (6 ft 7 in) from the talus-vegetation edge. They have wide home ranges and can find sufficient food, as the vegetation on the talus is widely dispersed.

The female has a low fertility rate, and generally produces two litters each year, with two to six (averaging 4.2) young, during the breeding season from spring to summer. The offspring are not reproductively active in their birth summer. Throughout much of the summer after their birth, the young live with their parents and forage on vegetation stored by them. During the following winter most juveniles live with their parents. The adult male and the female are rarely seen together during autumn, even though they have a mutual home range.

The stoat (Mustela erminea) is a major predator, and 19% of its feces were found to contain furs of the Turkestan red pika.

== Status and conservation ==
Since 1996, the Turkestan red pika is rated as a species of least concern on the IUCN Red List of Endangered Species. This is because although it has a patchy distribution, it is a widespread species in suitable habitat. It also has a stable population trend. There are no known major threats to the species, although low population density and low fertility rates are possible reasons for concern. At one time it used to be trapped for its fur, but that practice has now stopped. It is considered a near threatened species by the Chinese authorities in its distribution in that country.
