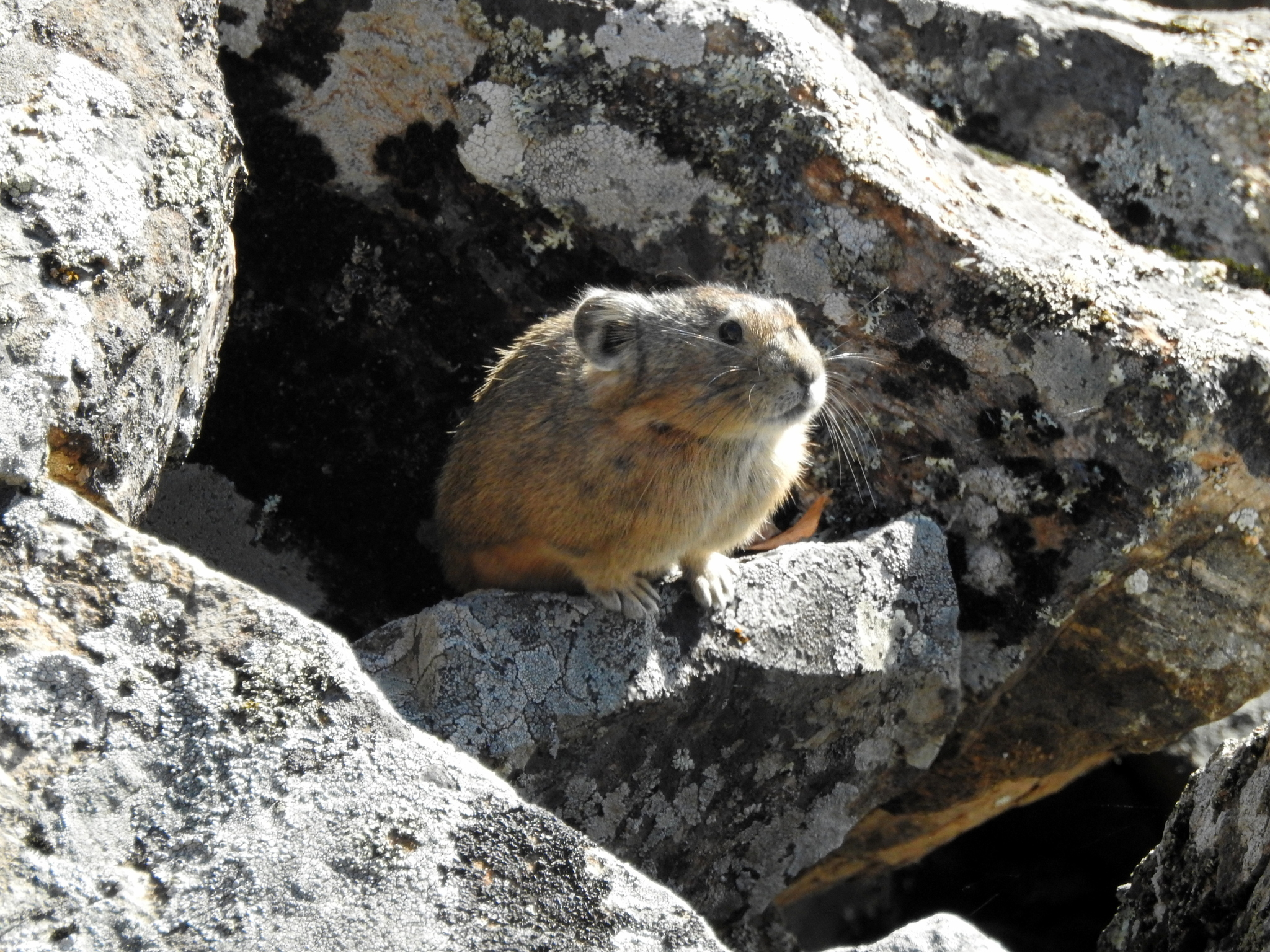

Conservation status
- Least Concern (IUCN 3.1)

Scientific classification
- Kingdom: Animalia
- Phylum: Chordata
- Class: Mammalia
- Order: Lagomorpha
- Family: Ochotonidae
- Genus: Ochotona
- Species: O. mantchurica

Binomial name
- Ochotona mantchurica (Thomas, 1909)
- Manchurian pika distribution

= Manchurian pika =

Species of mammal

The Manchurian pika (Ochotona mantchurica) is a species of mammal in the family Ochotonidae. It is found in the mountains of northeastern China in Inner Mongolia, specifically the Lesser and Greater Khingan ranges, as well as parts of Zabaykalsky Krai. It is rated as a species of least concern on the International Union for Conservation of Nature Red List of Endangered Species.

== Taxonomy ==
The Manchurian pika was originally divided into different classifications based on its populations' distribution, with those in Russia described as alpine pikas (O. alpina) and those elsewhere (which make up most of the nominative form) described as northern pikas (O. hyperborea). The species is on a whole closely related to both the northern pika and Hoffmann's pika (O. hoffmanni). It is separated from the former despite their nearly-overlapping distributions by its large skull, relative to other pikas.

=== Subspecies ===
Three subspecies have been identified:

- Ochotona mantchurica mantchurica (Thomas, 1909)

This subspecies is restricted to the Greater Khingan Range and the northern part of the Lesser Khingan Range.

- Ochotona mantchurica scorodumovi (Skalon, 1935)

Also known as Skorodumov's pika, this subspecies is found in southeast Transbaikal.

- Ochotona mantchurica loukashkini (Lissovsky, 2015)

This subspecies is found in the southern part of the Lesser Khingan Range.

== Description ==
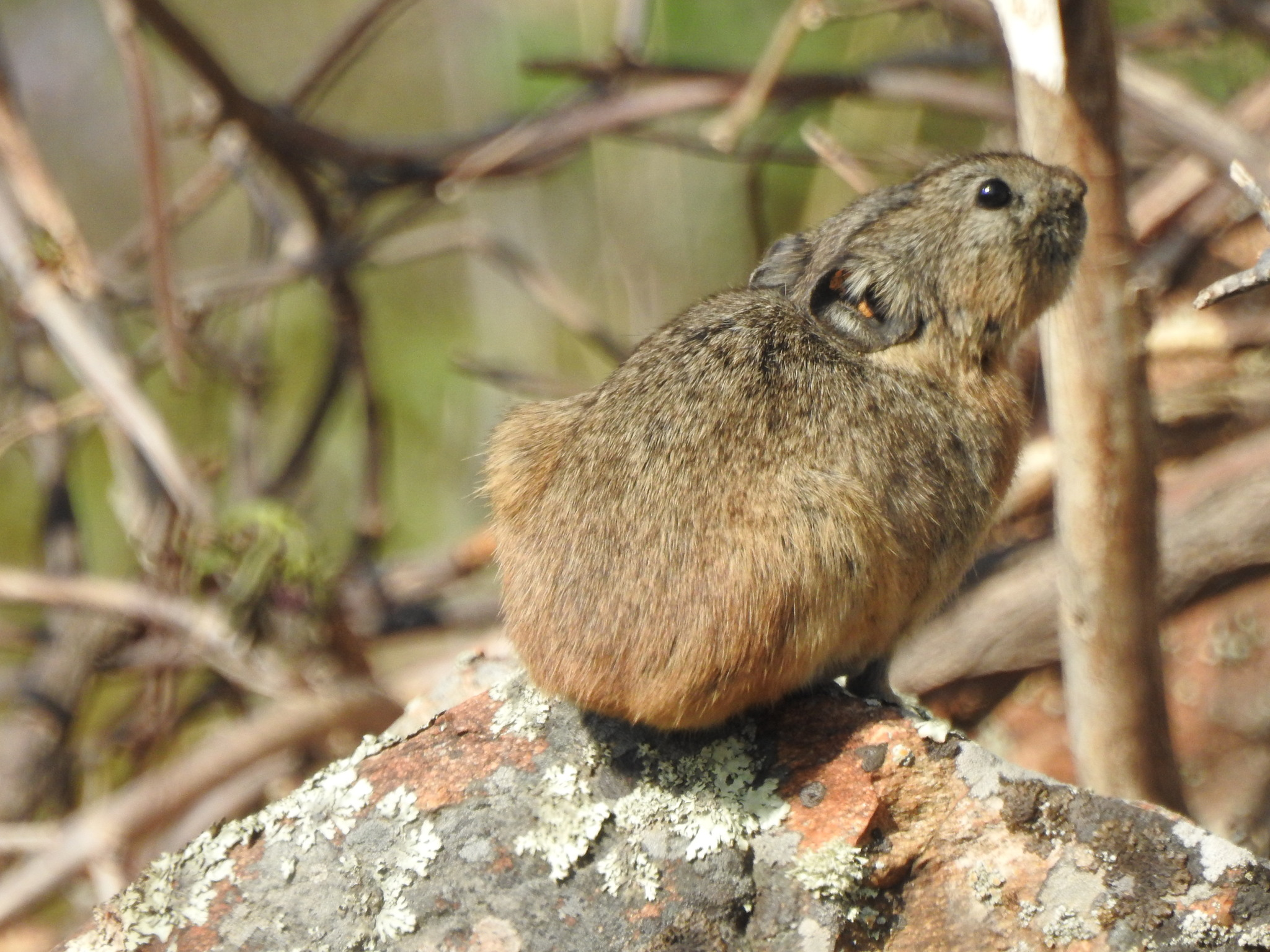
A Manchurian pika in Zabaykalsky Krai

The Manchurian pika is a pika of medium size. As an adult, its weight ranges from 110 to 260 grams (0.24 to 0.57 lb) and its combined head and body length averages from 140 to 220 millimetres (5.5 to 8.7 in). Typically, its fur is a reddish or ocherous brown, having a dark stripe along its upper back. Its winter coat is a greyish brown. It has rounded ears, which have a white margin around the edges. The Manchurian pika is distinguishable from the northern pika (O. hyperborea) by its elevated mandibles.
