= Korean pika =

Conservation status
- Data Deficient (IUCN 3.1)

Scientific classification
- Kingdom: Animalia
- Phylum: Chordata
- Class: Mammalia
- Order: Lagomorpha
- Family: Ochotonidae
- Genus: Ochotona
- Species: O. coreana

Binomial name
- Ochotona coreana (Allen & Andrews, 1913)
- Korean pika range

Species of mammal

The Korean pika (Ochotona coreana) (Korean: 우는토끼 or "Crying rabbit"), also known as the Korean piping hare, is a species of mammal in the family Ochotonidae. It is found in the mountainous northern regions of North Korea and parts of the Changbai Mountains in Jilin. It is rated as a data deficient species on the International Union for Conservation of Nature Red List of Endangered Species, and very little is known about it; much of its behavior and ecology is assumed to be similar to the closely related northern pika.

== Taxonomy ==
The Korean pika as it was first identified by Joel Asaph Allen and Roy Chapman Andrews was independent of any other species, but later treatments referred to it as O. hyperborea coreana, a subspecies of the northern pika. A 2014 review of the molecular biology of Ochotona led to it being considered an independent species once again.

The Korean pika has no subspecies.
