= Russellagus =

Russellagus Temporal range: Miocene

Scientific classification
- Kingdom: Animalia
- Phylum: Chordata
- Class: Mammalia
- Infraclass: Placentalia
- Order: Lagomorpha
- Family: Ochotonidae
- Genus: †Russellagus
- Species: †R. vonhofi

Binomial name
- †Russellagus vonhofi Storer, 1970

Extinct genus of lagomorph

Russellagus is an extinct genus of lagomorph that lived in North America during the Miocene epoch.

== Description ==
Russellagus vonhofi had rooted, hypsodont postcanine teeth. Its mandible contained mental foramina beneath the trigonids of the first molar and the fourth premolar, with the latter mental foramen being smaller than the former. The ventral border of horizontal ramus was straight below the postcanine teeth, and it curved sharply ventrally to the angle. The lower molariform teeth had narrower and mesiodistally lengthened talonids than trigonids. The upper cheek teeth were unilaterally hypsodont.

== Palaeobiology ==
In contrast to the mandibular incisors of Ondatra, the maxillary fourth premolars of Russellagus exhibited significant change with wear.
