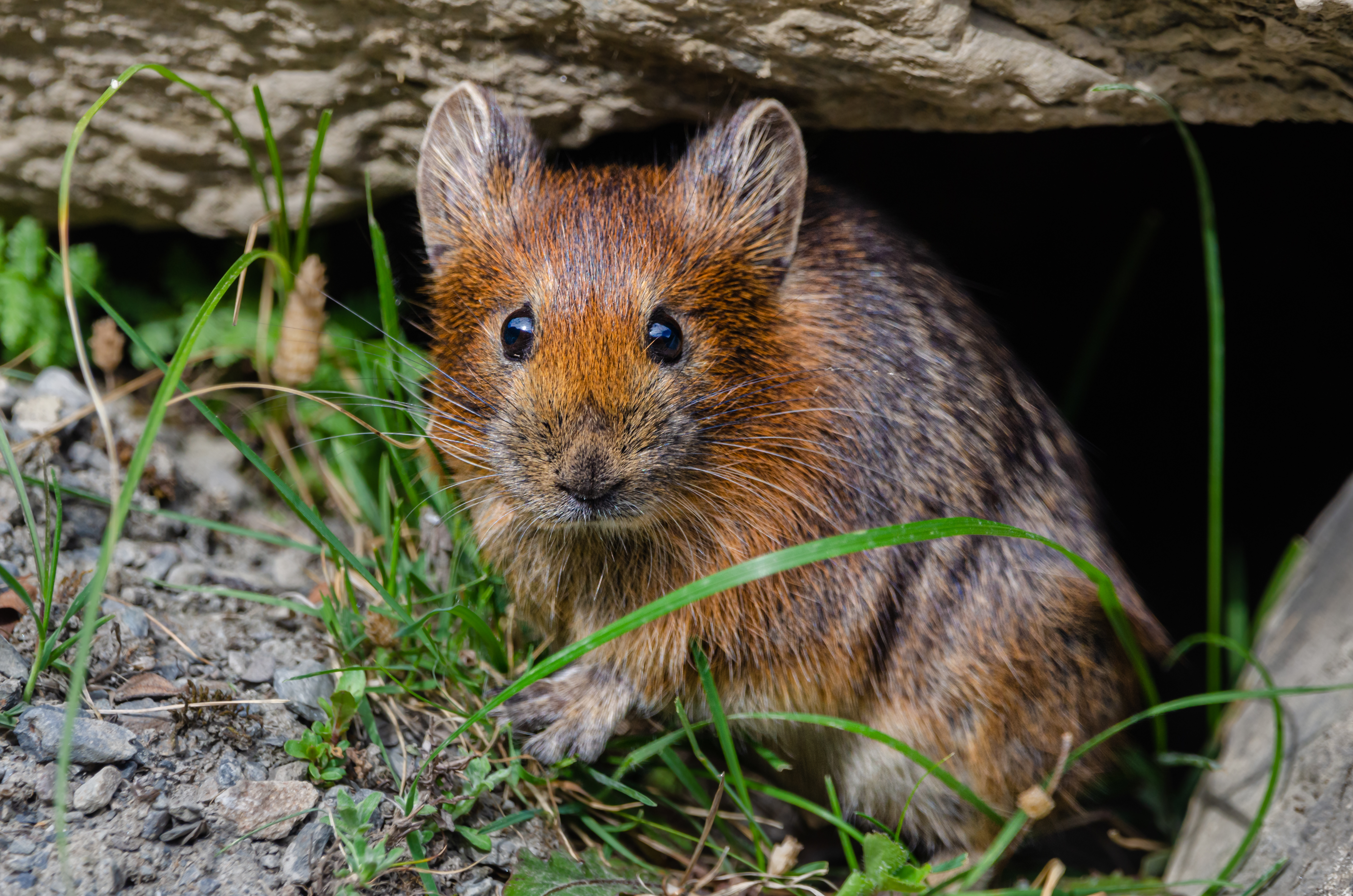

Conservation status
- Least Concern (IUCN 3.1)

Scientific classification
- Kingdom: Animalia
- Phylum: Chordata
- Class: Mammalia
- Infraclass: Placentalia
- Order: Lagomorpha
- Family: Ochotonidae
- Genus: Ochotona
- Species: O. roylii

Binomial name
- Ochotona roylii Ogilby, 1839

Subspecies
- O. r. nepalensis; O. r. himalayana; O. r. wardi; O. r. roylei
- Royle's pika range

Synonyms
- Ochotona himalayana Feng, 1973

= Royle's pika =

Species of mammal

Royle's pika (Ochotona roylii), also called the Himalayan hare or hui shutu, is a species of pika. It is found in Bhutan, China, India, Nepal, and Pakistan.

== Taxonomy ==
Royle's pika was first described in 1839 as Lagomys roylii by William Ogilby, with the type locality being Choor Mountain in Himachal Pradesh.

The subspecies O. r. himalayana, the Himalayan pika, was considered a distinct species for a brief period, but was reclassified as a subtaxon of O. roylii in 2014.

== Description ==
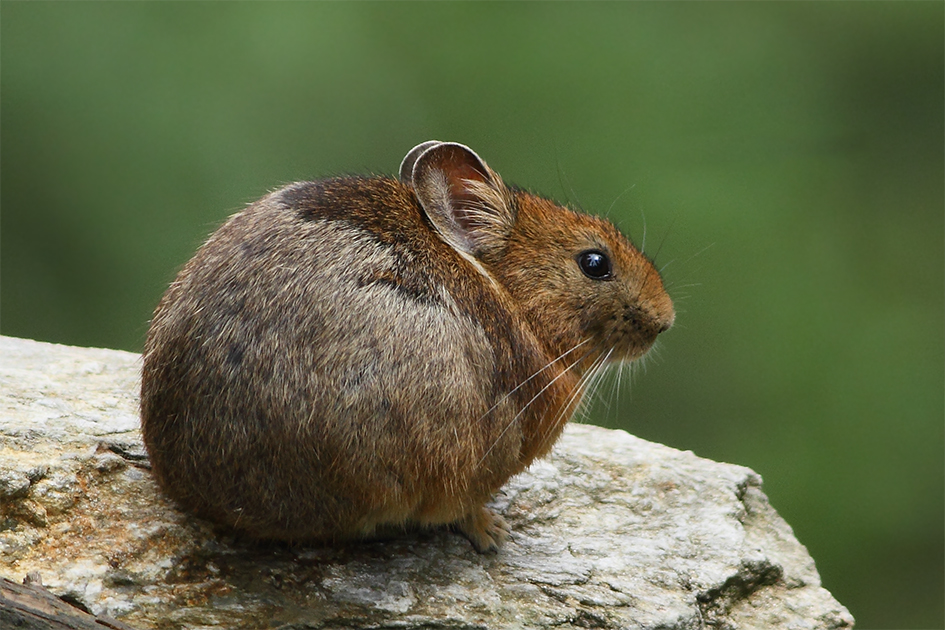
An individual near Tungnath in Uttarakhand, India

The most common pika species in the Himalayas, it has a length of 17-22 centimeters. Royle's pika has a slightly arched head, with a rufous-grey body and chestnut-colored head, as well as sparse hair in front of its ears.

== Distribution and habitat ==
Royle's pika is the most common pika species in the Himalayas, and can be confused with the sympatric large-eared pika. These species are mostly seen in the open rocky mountain edges or slopes, or on ground covered with conifer trees, such as pine, deodar and rhododendron forests. Royle's pika are a crepuscular foraging species, as they tend to be inactive during midday hours. Reduction of activity during the midday is also contributed to increasing temperatures, which causes heat stress on the species. During monsoon season, foraging is encouraged due to greater food availability. The species has also been found near human habitation. It does not make its own nest; rather, it takes narrow creeks and existing burrow systems as its nest, filling it with hay piles and pine leaves. It also uses the rocky areas on the mountains to take refuge and escape from predators.

== Behavior and ecology ==
Royle's pika typically lives a solitary life, and across its range has a low population density. In the Nepal Himalayas, it occurs with a density of 12.5 individuals per hectare, and 16.2 per hectare in the Garhwal Himalayas. It is a synanthrope. Unlike other pika species, it does not frequently store food by constructing haypiles.

=== Reproduction ===
Royle's pika produces 2 to 3 offspring per year.

== Threats and conservation ==
=== Threats ===
Pikas in general have been faced with habitat loss in lower elevations due to climate-influenced changes, such as heat, cold, or lower nutritional availability, leading populations to retreat to habitats at higher elevations. Increased restriction in habitat has led the solitary Royle's pika to have reduced genetic diversity in regions where populations are spaced more than 1 kilometre (0.62 mi) apart.

=== Conservation status ===
The International Union for Conservation of Nature (IUCN) considers Ochotona roylii to be a least-concern species. The size of its population is unknown, but it is considered to be stable and widespread throughout its range. Human logging and agricultural development contribute to habitat loss, but these are not considered major threats to the species and its recovery from climate-related population declines. As there are currently no conservation actions being implemented, the species has an IUCN Green Status listing of "slightly depleted".
