= Kazakh pika =

Conservation status
- Least Concern (IUCN 3.1)

Scientific classification
- Kingdom: Animalia
- Phylum: Chordata
- Class: Mammalia
- Infraclass: Placentalia
- Order: Lagomorpha
- Family: Ochotonidae
- Genus: Ochotona
- Species: O. opaca

Binomial name
- Ochotona opaca Argyropulo, 1930
- Kazakh pika range

Species of pika

The Kazakh pika (Ochotona opaca) is a species of pika endemic to Kazakhstan. It is found at the elevation of 400–1,000 m (1,300–3,300 ft) in semi-desert areas with rocks and shrubs. It was previously a population of Pallas's pika before being split into its own species.The Kazach pika was also thought to be the Helan Shan pika, but was determined genetically distinct enough to be its own species.

== Description ==
The Kazakh pika is medium-sized. Its dorsal fur is ocherous gray. Its ventral fur is sandy or whitish. During the winter, its dorsal fur is long, soft, and yellowish gray, and its belly is whitish. Hairs above its neck gland form a small brown patch. Its ears are rounded, with light margins.
