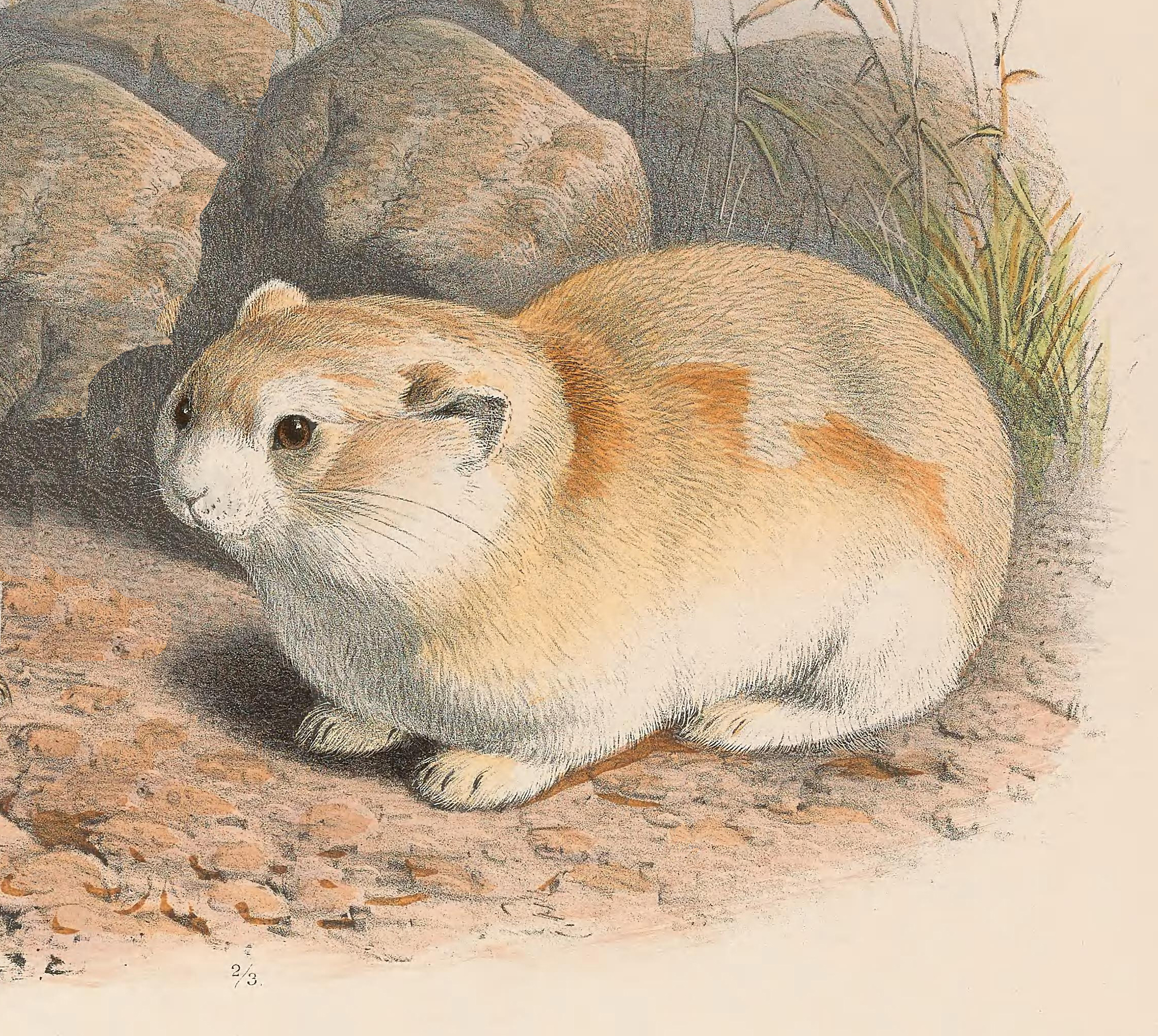

Conservation status
- Endangered (IUCN 3.1)

Scientific classification
- Kingdom: Animalia
- Phylum: Chordata
- Class: Mammalia
- Order: Lagomorpha
- Family: Ochotonidae
- Genus: Ochotona
- Species: O. koslowi

Binomial name
- Ochotona koslowi (Buchner, 1894)
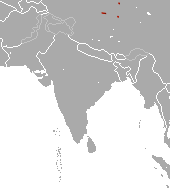
- Koslov's pika range

= Koslov's pika =

Species of mammal

Koslov's pika or Kozlov's pika (Ochotona koslowi) is a species of mammal in the family Ochotonidae. It is endemic to China. Its natural habitat is tundra. It is threatened by habitat loss. Kozlov's pika are herbivores, they are known as "ecosystem engineers" as they're known to promote diversity of different plants species. Specifically, this species of Pikas has been enlisted as "endangered" in China. Kozlov Pikas are estimated to be within the Northern edge of the Arkatag Range in China.

== See also ==
- List of endangered and protected species of China

== Sources ==
Chapman, Joseph A, and John E.C. Flux. "Rabbits, Hares and Pikas: Status Survey and Conservation Action Plan." International Union for Conservation of Nature, IUCN/SSC Lagomorph Specialist Group, 1990, https://portals.iucn.org/library/sites/library/files/documents/1990-010.pdf.
