= Ili pika =

Conservation status
- Endangered (IUCN 3.1)

Scientific classification
- Kingdom: Animalia
- Phylum: Chordata
- Class: Mammalia
- Infraclass: Placentalia
- Order: Lagomorpha
- Family: Ochotonidae
- Genus: Ochotona
- Species: O. iliensis

Binomial name
- Ochotona iliensis Li & Ma, 1986
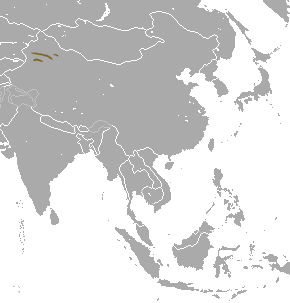
- Ili pika range

Species of mammal

The Ili pika or magic rabbit (Ochotona iliensis) is a species of mammal in the family Ochotonidae, endemic to northwest China. After its discovery in 1983, it was studied for a decade.

Increased temperatures and increased grazing pressure may have caused the rapid decline in population, along with air pollution.

According to IUCN last assessed in 2018, the Ili pika is now considered an endangered species, with approximately fewer than 1,000 left.

== Description ==
The Ili pika somewhat resembles a short-eared rabbit. It is large for a pika, with a length of 20.3–20.4 centimetres (8.0–8.0 in) and a weight of up to 250 grams (0.55 lb). It has brightly colored hair and displays large rusty-red spots on forehead, crown, and the sides of the neck. The Ili Pika resides in mountains high up, where oxygen levels are low, this helps them avoid predators.

== Range ==
It is endemic to the Tian Shan mountains of northwest Chinese province Xinjiang. A recent census indicated that the Ili pika may have been extirpated from the Jilimalale and Hutubi South Mountains.

== Ecology ==
The Ili pika inhabits talus slopes at high elevations, usually from about 2,800 to 4,100 meters. This species constructs haypiles and is a generalized herbivore. It primarily feeds on grasses and herbs. It occupies slightly sloping high rock walls or cliff faces interlaced with gaps or holes that serve as dens. In the decade following its discovery, the Ili Pika was found at 11 localities in the northern spur of the Tian Shan, extending roughly from 82°21′ – 87°25′ E longitude. An additional two populations were discovered in the center of a smaller southern spur of the Tian Shan, a range which extends from 82°20′ – 84°13′ E. The Ili Pika is found only on these two ridges, and these coordinates define the maximum possible distribution of the species.

Almost nothing is known about the ecology or behavior of the species. The Ili pika has low population densities. It is mostly a diurnal species, but may exhibit nocturnal activity. Two litters are initiated each breeding season, in which two young are found in a nest, but only one is successful. The second litter is conceived following a post-partum estrus- when their mother's fat reserves have been already used up. Therefore, the second litter is abandoned due to the limitation of resources needed to nurture them.

The Ili pika is similar to other rock-dwelling pikas in that they are asocial creatures, however, they are less likely to utter vocalizations. Also, the Ili pika varies the percent of time it is active during the day or night based on seasons. During the winter season, they are more active during the day while during the spring and fall, they are more active at night.

== Conservation ==
The species was first observed by conservationist Li Weidong in 1983. After three years of research, Li and his team named it the Ili pika, after the area where it is found, the Ili Prefecture on the far west side of China's Xinjiang province. The animal was not observed again until May 2014 (again by Li). Up to 2015, a total of 29 live sightings were reported.

There were three specimens captured that were observed and used to describe the species in 1986. Additionally, there were studies conducted in the same decade to learn more about the species. These studies involved physical presence in the sites where Ili pikas had been thought to be present. These studies were not successful since there were few to no pikas available at various sites. There are total six known regions where the ili pikas reside, of which there were two regions where they were already extinct when they were first discovered. Now they are extinct in three out of the six.

Its population has been reduced by 70% within 15 years. Population declines have been observed for several locations inhabited by this species. A recent census indicated that the Ili pika may have been extirpated from the Jilimalale and Hutubi South Mountains. Populations have declined in the regions of Jipuk, Tianger Apex, and Telimani Daban. Only one examined site, the Bayingou region of Xinjiang Uygur, showed signs of previously observed abundance. An estimated 2,000 mature individuals existed in the early 1990s. The exact causes for recently observed population declines are not known with certainty, but it is speculated that an increase in grazing pressure and global atmospheric pollution resulting in climate change are negatively affecting populations. It has been suggested that a warming climate has increased the presence of vegetation and animal species from lower elevations in the pika's habitat, leading to a larger number of attendant predators (e.g., foxes) to which pika populations had not so far been exposed. Researchers also believe that some other reasons for the decline in the Ila pika population may be disease throughout the species or increased human activity in the area. Low population densities and reproductive rates coupled with the relatively limited ability to disperse impede the ability of the species to recover from declines. One study of captive animals suggests that the species has some capacity to adapt its feeding habits to lower elevations. The high temperatures in the mountains due to climate change are causing the Ili pika to migrate up and will eventually be forced to reach the peak, where it is occupied, and sooner the Ili pika will no longer have anywhere to go. There are no known conservation measures in place for the Ili pika.

== See also ==
- List of endangered and protected species of China
