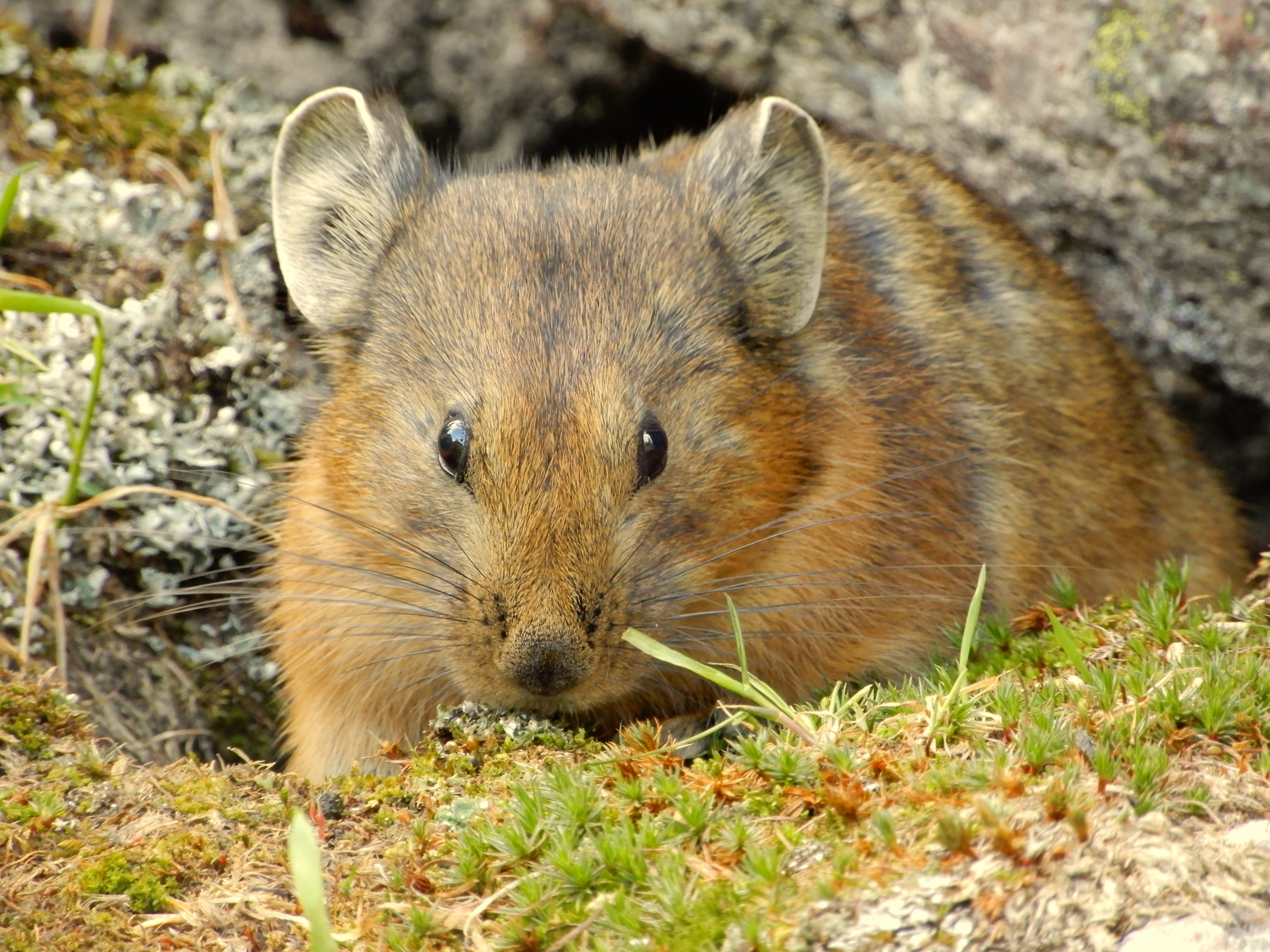
- East Kazakhstan Region, Kazakhstan

Conservation status
- Least Concern (IUCN 3.1)

Scientific classification
- Kingdom: Animalia
- Phylum: Chordata
- Class: Mammalia
- Order: Lagomorpha
- Family: Ochotonidae
- Genus: Ochotona
- Species: O. alpina

Binomial name
- Ochotona alpina (Pallas, 1773)

Subspecies
- O. a. alpina Pallas, 1773; O. a. changaica Ognev, 1940; O. a. cinereofusca Schrenk, 1858; O. a. sushkini Thomas, 1924
- Alpine pika range

Synonyms
- Ochotona ater Eversmann, 1842; Ochotona nitida Hollister, 1912; Ochotona scorodumovi Skalon, 1935

= Alpine pika =

Species of mammal

The alpine pika (Ochotona alpina) is a species of small mammal in the pika family, Ochotonidae. The summer pelage of different subspecies varies drastically but, in general, it is dark or cinnamon brown, turning to grey with a yellowish tinge during the winter. The alpine pika is found in western Mongolia, eastern Kazakhstan, and Russia (Tuva, Irkutsk, Altai, and Krasnoyarsk), as well as in China (northern Xinjiang and Heilongjiang), in very cold, mountainous regions. It is a generalist herbivore, and mainly forages on mosses, tree branches, pine nuts, and plant stems. It can emit three series of different vocalizations: a long call, a short call, and an alarm call. It is rated as a species of least concern on the IUCN Red List of Endangered Species.

== Taxonomy ==
German zoologist and botanist Peter Simon Pallas originally described the alpine pika in 1773, in his work Reise durch verschiedene Provinzen des Russischen Reichs. It is a large species in the pika family, Ochotonidae, which consists of small mammals that have short ears, forelimbs very slightly longer than hindlimbs, and no external tail. There are four recognised subspecies: O. a. alpina (Pallas, 1773), O. a. cinereofusca (Schrenk, 1858), O. a. sushkini (Thomas, 1924), and O. a. changaica (Ognev, 1940).

The northern pika was included as a subspecies of the alpine pika by several authorities such as Vinogradov and Argyropulo in 1941; Argyropulo in 1948; Gureev in 1964; Corbet in 1978; Honacki, Kinman, and Koeppl in 1982; Weston in 1982; and Feng and Zheng in 1985. However, in 1973, Nikolai Vorontsov and Elena Ivanitskaya, pointed out the difference between their chromosome numbers. In 1980, Vladimir Sokolov and V. N. Orlov treated them as separate species, with their ranges overlapping in the Khenteii and Khangai Mountains in Mongolia. It is believed that after glaciation, the ancestors of the alpine pika were restricted to the borders of the Sayan and Altai glaciers, as well as the periglacial region of the major North Asiatic glaciation. The American pika and the collared pika were also included as subspecies of the alpine pika, by A.I. Argyropulo in 1948, A.A. Gureev in 1964, and G.B. Corbet in 1968. However, in 1981, M.L. Weston found out that they were morphologically different from the alpine pika. In 1986, Corbet and J.E. Hill treated them as separate species. O. a. sushkini was formerly considered a subspecies of the Pallas's pika, but is now a subspecies of the alpine pika. The Helan Shan pika and the Hoffmann's pika were formerly included as a subspecies of the alpine pika, but are now considered an independent species based on their chromosome number, morphology, and bioacoustic behaviour.

== Description ==
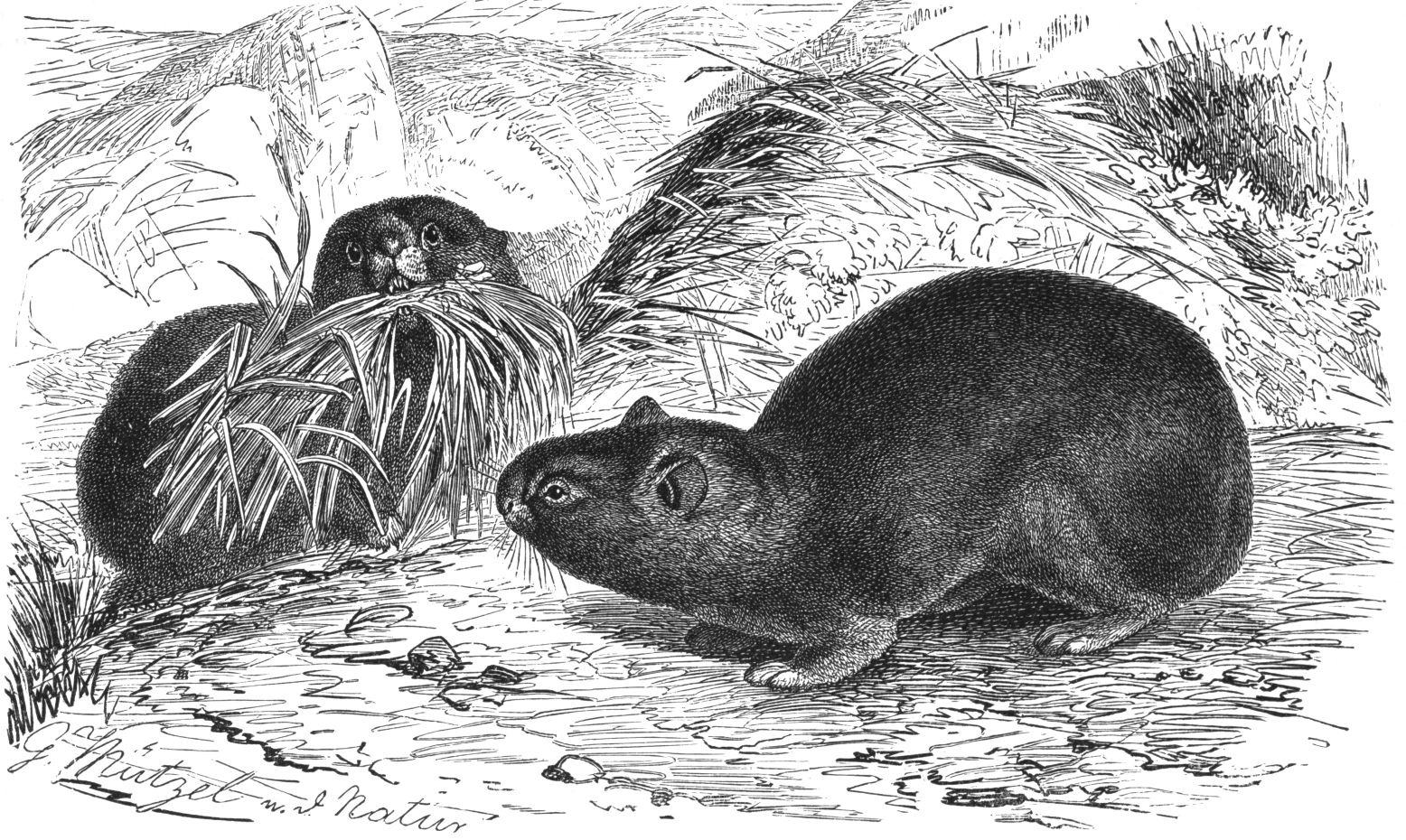
Illustration by Gustav Mützel

The alpine pika measures 152 to 235 mm (6.0 to 9.3 in) in length, has long rounded ears ranging from 17 to 26 mm (0.67 to 1.02 in) in length, and weighs 226 to 360 g (8.0 to 12.7 oz). The skull is narrow, measuring 41 to 54 mm (1.6 to 2.1 in) in length, and is less rounded and longer than the skull of the northern pika. In addition, the alpine pika has a longer snout, the back of the skull is bent more downward, and the bullae are deeper and much narrower, compared to those of the northern pika. The parietal bones (the two bones in the skull, which, when joined together at a fibrous joint, form the sides and roof of the skull) protrude at the front, forming a sloping angle with the interparietal bone (bone situated between the parietal bone and the supraoccipital bone located at the back and lower part of the skull), at the back. It has a large, thick cheek bone.

The summer pelage of different subspecies varies drastically but is generally dark or cinnamon brown. The back is dull, yellowish, ochre-grey in colour, with dark brown to black tips of the hairs. The latus (side of the body between the rib cage and the uppermost and largest part of the hip bone) is tinged with rust-red, and the underside is pale yellowish ochre. In winter, its pelage turns grey, with a yellowish tinge; the underside becomes greyish brown, and the anterior dorsum and head are tinged with yellow. The incisive foramen (funnel-shaped opening in the bony plate of the skull, located in the roof of the mouth, immediately behind the incisor teeth where blood vessels and nerves pass) are round, small, and are detached from the palatine foramen.

Despite geographic and seasonal variation, in sympatric zones, the adult alpine pika is larger than the adult northern pika by body measurements, and is usually more dull coloured.

== Distribution and habitat ==
The alpine pika inhabits mountainous areas in western Mongolia bordering the Gobi Desert, eastern Kazakhstan, southern Russia (Tuva, Irkutsk, Altai, and Krasnoyarsk) and China (northern Xinjiang and Heilongjiang). It is found on mountain ranges such as the Altai, Khangai, and Sayan, and is also distributed from the east and south of Lake Baikal eastward to the Amur River drainage. An isolated alpine pika population occurs at the northwest Ningxia-Hexi Zoulang-Gansu border, on the Helan Mountains. O. a. cinereofusca is found in Heilongjiang and Russia, while O. a. nitida is found in northern Xinjiang, Russia, Mongolia, and Kazakhstan.

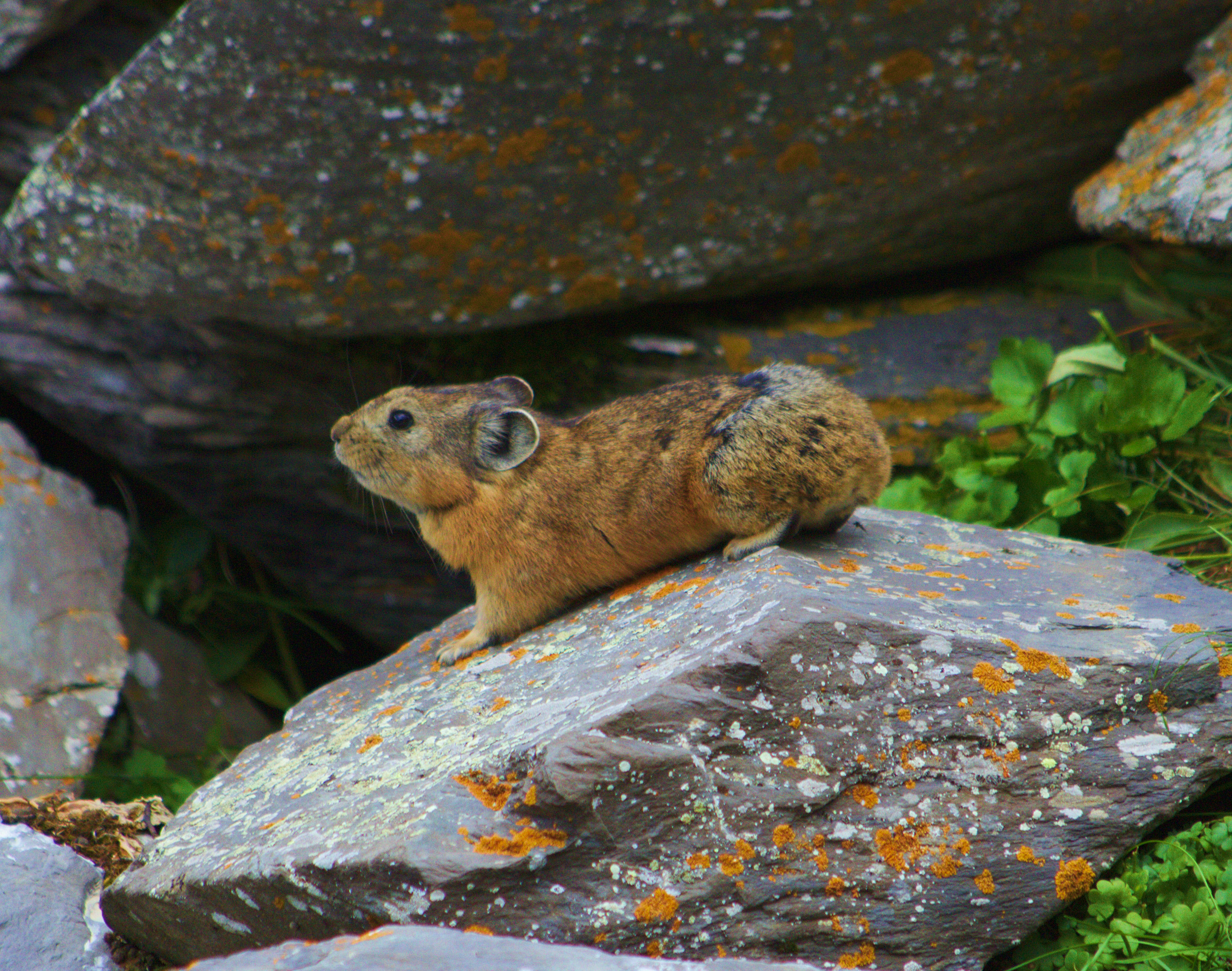
In the Saylyugem Mountains in Mongolia

The animal tends to be found in rocky habitats. It occupies talus piles (collection of broken rock pieces at the base of cliffs, volcanoes, or valley shoulders, accumulated due to periodic rockfall from adjacent cliff faces) with larger stones and rocky areas although it does not inhabit swampy montane tundra or talus lacking vegetation. It may also live in burrows under tree roots or in old moss-scree.

The alpine pika's habitat is separated from that of the northern pika by altitude or by microhabitat in their zone of sympatry, and it lives at both higher and lower altitudes than the northern pika. It is found at heights of 400 to 2,500 m (1,300 to 8,200 ft) above sea level in the Altai Mountains, and above 2,000 metres (6,600 ft) in China.

In the early 1970s, an unexplained decline in the alpine pika population occurred throughout the western Sayan Mountains. Although in 1977 Khlebnikov suggested it was due to an epidemic, it was difficult to ascertain if such a large territory had been affected all at once. By 1986 or 1987, a few localities that had high alpine pika population densities 16 to 17 years earlier became devoid of the species, due to its low reproductive rate and the insular nature of its habitat.

== Behaviour and ecology ==
The alpine pika is a generalist herbivore, mainly foraging for mosses, trees branches, pine nuts, and plant stems, which it gathers during the summer to create haypiles for use in winter. These haypiles were estimated by I.V. Travina in 1984 to be as much as 30 kg per hectare (12 kg per acre) when the population density is around 10 to 12 individuals per hectare. This store would sometimes be shared with other species such as reindeer. In 1978, Khlebnikova documented the influence exerted by the alpine pika on plant diversity and composition in the regions they inhabit. These include reduced seed content of the soil, decreased ratio of flowering plants, and slow succession of plants such as the Siberian pine due to the pika's foraging on young trees. The remnants of the haypiles, however, might facilitate plant growth and the accumulation of pellets that create spots of nitrophilic vegetation (vegetation rich in nitrogen).

The species lives in families, with population densities of 10 to 12 individuals per hectare. Family feeding territories do not overlap with each other, and mostly remain the same each year; however, the home territories of different family groups are larger and do overlap with each other. Both males and females have been observed to mark corners of stones mostly located near the center of their home territory, from April to December, by rubbing their neck glands against them.

The female's fecundity is low, as with other pikas inhabiting talus piles, and the size of litters decreases as the elevation increases. A.F. Potapkina observed a seasonal increase in the number of offspring per litter. On average, the female of the western Altai Mountains produces two litters, while in the northwestern Altai and the western Sayan Mountains she produces 2.7 litters—with 10% producing up to three litters in the latter case. In 1984, G.I. Makushin and G.I. Orlov determined the average annual mortality rate of the alpine pika to be 53% for populations living in forests and 41% for those living in the alpine zones—most of them aged between one and three years. The annual population density fluctuations of most populations were insignificant.

=== Vocalizations ===
The alpine pika can emit three different vocalizations. The long call is heard during the mating season from only the subspecies O. a. alpina, O. a. changaica, and O. a. nitida. The short call is a harsh, sharp whistle that is easily distinguishable from the short high-pitched whistle of the northern pika. The alarm call is given out immediately any danger from predators or humans is perceived, and can travel greater distances than the calls of most other pika species.

=== Parasites ===
Internal parasites of the alpine pika include many worm species, such as Schizorchis altaica, Cephaluris andrejevi, Heligmosomum dubinini, and Eugenuris schumakovitschi. Schizorchis altaica was found in individuals inhabiting the southern Altai mountains, and Heligmosomum dubinini in those inhabiting the Sayan and Altai mountains.

== Status and conservation ==
Since 1996, the alpine pika has been rated a species of least concern on the IUCN Red List of Endangered Species. This is because it is widespread, with no known population decline. Despite the lack of data relating to its current population state, it is thought to have a stable trend, with some isolated populations exhibiting some variation. It has been regionally red-listed in China and Mongolia as a species of least concern, and about 12% of its population in Mongolia is found in protected areas.
