= Flank (anatomy) =

Side of the body between the rib cage and the hip

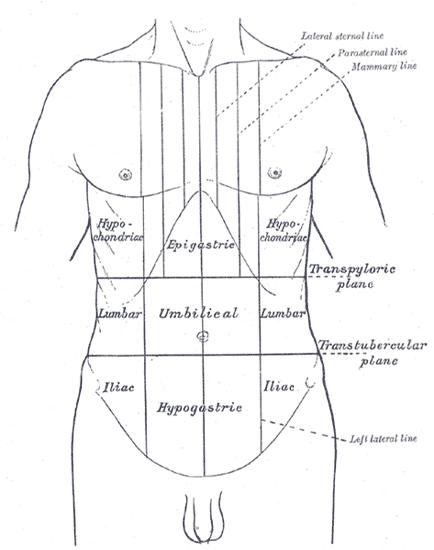
- Surface lines of the front of the thorax and abdomen. (Latus labeled as "lumbar".)

Details

Identifiers
- Latin: regio lateralis
- TA98: A01.2.04.004
- TA2: 259
- FMA: 14603

The flank or latus is the side of the body between the rib cage and the iliac bone of the hip (below the rib cage and above the ilium).

It is sometimes called the lumbar region.
