= Tsing-ling pika =

Conservation status
- Least Concern (IUCN 3.1)

Scientific classification
- Kingdom: Animalia
- Phylum: Chordata
- Class: Mammalia
- Order: Lagomorpha
- Family: Ochotonidae
- Genus: Ochotona
- Species: O. syrinx

Binomial name
- Ochotona syrinx Thomas, 1911
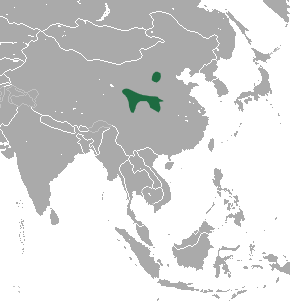
- Tsing-ling pika range

Synonyms
- Ochotona dauurica huangensis (Matschie, 1908)

Species of mammal

The Tsing-ling pika (Ochotona syrinx) is a species of pika endemic to the mountains in Central China. It inhabits mountainous forests and shrublands. It is a poorly known species.

It is a rarely found, one of the six pika species endemic to central China, although the taxonomy of these is in flux, with no true population studies. (Note: The other five species are Thomas's pika (Ochotona thomasi), Forrest's pika (Ochotona forresti), Gaoligong pika (Ochotona gaoligongensis), Muli pika (Ochotona muliensis), and Black pika (Ochotona nigritia).) The name "Tsing-ling" derives from an old transliteration of "Qinling", the name of the mountains that it inhabits.
