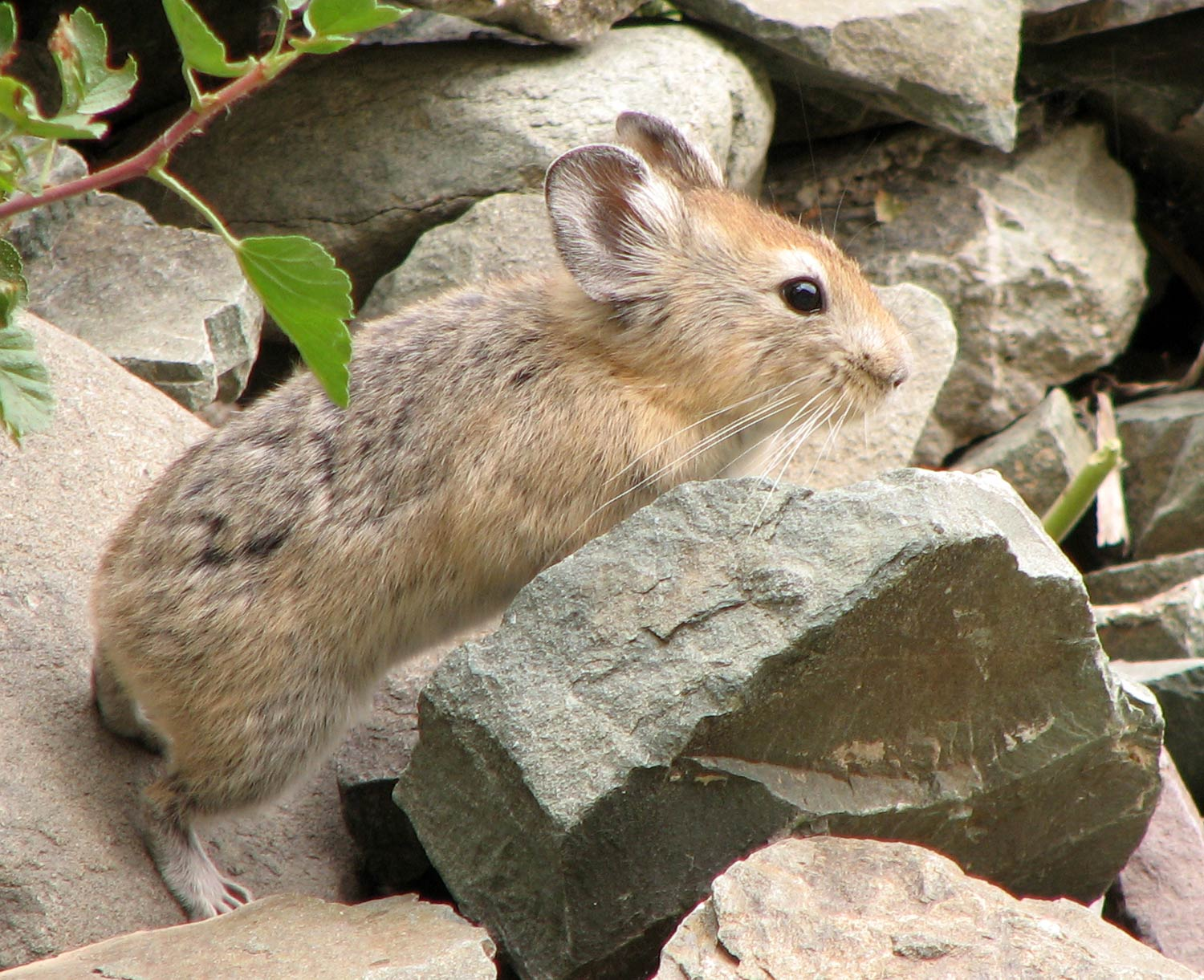
- at Ladakh, India

Conservation status
- Least Concern (IUCN 3.1)

Scientific classification
- Kingdom: Animalia
- Phylum: Chordata
- Class: Mammalia
- Order: Lagomorpha
- Family: Ochotonidae
- Genus: Ochotona
- Species: O. macrotis

Binomial name
- Ochotona macrotis (Günther, 1875)
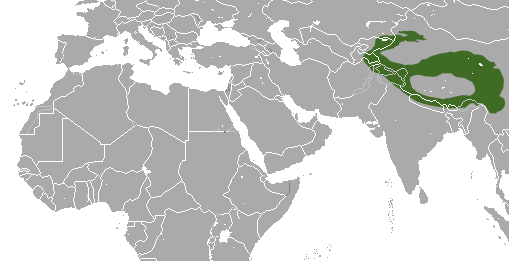
- Large-eared pika range

= Large-eared pika =

Species of mammal

The large-eared pika (Ochotona macrotis) is a species of small mammal in the family Ochotonidae. It is found in mountainous regions of Afghanistan, Tibet, Bhutan, India, Kazakhstan, Kyrgyzstan, Nepal, Pakistan and Tajikistan where it nests among boulders and scree.

== Description ==
The large-eared pika has brownish-grey fur tinged with ochre. The forehead, cheeks and shoulder region have a reddish tinge which is more obvious in summer. The underparts are greyish-white. The four legs are all about the same length and the feet, including the soles, are covered with fur. An adult large-eared pika is 15 to 20.4 cm (6 to 8 in) long.

== Distribution and habitat ==
The large-eared pika is native to mountainous regions of Central Asia. Its range includes Afghanistan, Bhutan, India, Pakistan, Nepal, Kazakhstan, Kyrgyzstan and Tajikistan and the provinces of Gansu, Qinghai, Sichuan, Tibet, Xinjiang and Yunnan in China. Its minimum altitude is about 2,300 metres (7,500 ft) and it has been recorded at altitudes of 6,130 metres (20,113 feet) in the Himalayas. The large-eared pika does not make a burrow but lives in crevices among the shattered rock and scree found in mountainous regions.

== Biology ==
The large-eared pika is territorial, an adult pair occupying an exclusive area. In different parts of their range they are found at densities varying between 6 and 18 individuals per hectare. They are prey species for various carnivorous mammals and birds of prey.

The large-eared pika is an herbivore and is diurnal. It feeds on grasses and other vegetation, twigs, lichens and mosses. Some populations make "haypiles" of dried grasses in their burrows to help see them through the winter when fresh greenery is scarce. There are usually two litters a year, each with two to three young. The gestation period is approximately 30 days. The juveniles are mature by the next breeding season and the life expectancy of this species is about three years.

== Status ==
Although the population size of the large-eared pika is unknown, it has an extensive range and seems to be common within its upland habitat. No particular threats have been identified so the IUCN, in its Red List of Threatened Species, lists it as being of "Least Concern".
