= Hoffmann's pika =

Conservation status
- Endangered (IUCN 3.1)

Scientific classification
- Kingdom: Animalia
- Phylum: Chordata
- Class: Mammalia
- Order: Lagomorpha
- Family: Ochotonidae
- Genus: Ochotona
- Species: O. hoffmanni

Binomial name
- Ochotona hoffmanni Formozov, Yakhontov & Dmitriev, 1996
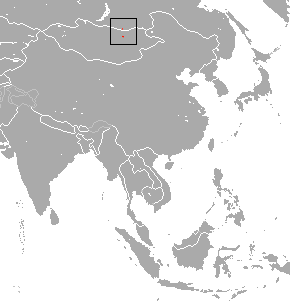
- Hoffmann's pika range

Synonyms
- Ochotona alpina ssp. hoffmanni Formozov, Yakhontov & Dmitriev, 1996; Ochotona alpina ssp. nova

Species of mammal

Hoffmann's pika (Ochotona hoffmanni) is a species of pika that is endemic to Mongolia. It is currently listed as an endangered species by the International Union for Conservation of Nature.

== Etymology ==
The word "pika" was first coined by the Evenks of Siberia to describe the calls pikas use to communicate with each other. The genus name of Hoffmann's pika, Ochotona, was inspired by "ogdai," the term Mongolians use to refer to pikas.

== Taxonomy ==
Hoffmann's pika is a member of the kingdom Animalia, the phylum Chordata, the class Mammalia, the order Lagomorpha, and the family Ochotonidae. It shares its family (Ochotonidae) with all other pikas, and the family Ochotonidae represents about a third of the diversity of the order Lagomorpha (which also includes hares and rabbits). The genus Ochotona is the sole extant genus of the family Ochotonidae, with the other extinct genera in Ochotonidae dating as far back as the Eocene.

== Description ==
Hoffmann's pika, like other pika species, is a small furry animal (between 125 and 130 mm (4.9 and 5.1 in) in length, and 70 to 300 g (2.5 to 10.6 oz) in weight) with short round ears, which do not move readily, and short limbs, which give it an egg-like appearance. Newborn Hoffmann's pikas are helpless and naked or slightly furred. Its nostrils can be completely closed, and it has an extremely short tail, which is hardly visible. The two front paws have five digits and the back paws have four, which all have curved claws and are covered by long hair, leaving only the digit pads exposed. When completing quick movements (such as running) they are considered digitigrade, and are considered plantigrade during slow movements. They have a high metabolic rate and are considered endothermic. Males and females are about the same size and are difficult to tell apart.

== Behavior ==
=== Social behavior ===
Unlike Alpine pikas, which live in a family group, Hoffmann's pikas are typically asocial. They rarely interact, unless they are in pairs. These pairs will claim territory together and share a hay-storage, which they store together. They are very territorial of their claimed talus, or sloping rock formation, especially against those of the same sex. Both of the sexes claim their talus using scent-markings and vocalizations. While they can defend territories in pairs, males are more known to defend their territory from intruders than females.

=== Feeding behavior ===
Hoffmann's pikas are similar in feeding behavior to other Asian pikas, especially the Alpine pikas. Hoffmann's pikas collect vegetation by ripping plants out of the ground with their mouths and bringing it back to their claimed territory. This behavior is known as haying. This practice allows them to save food during periods of sparse vegetation. However, Hoffmann's pikas can over-harvest, which can cause them to run out of food.

== Diet ==
Hoffmann's pikas, like other pikas, are herbivores that consume a wide variety of vegetation, such as leaves, seeds and leaves of grasses, and stems of forbs and shrubs. They may even eat small quantities of animal matter. They choose plants for consumption based on availability, nutritional content, and preference. Hoffmann's pikas do not continuously forage for a single source of vegetation; they alternate among available sources of foliage, resulting in a stabilized plant community composition and an overall deceleration of the process of succession. Similar to other pikas, Hoffmann's pikas store vegetation in haypiles for consumption during the winter months.

== Reproduction ==
In general, pikas breed twice a year, in the spring and in the summer, and many species will have two or more litters per year. Rock dwelling pikas, such as Hoffmann's pika, have a gestation period of 30 days. Embryo resorption may occur if the pika encounters adverse conditions. Young rock dwelling pikas, such as Hoffmann's pika, will first breed as yearlings. In general, it appears that Hoffmann's pikas are monogamous Pikas have scent glands, as do all lagomorphs.

=== Female reproductive tract ===
The uterus is duplex. The placenta is discoid, deciduate, and hemochorial, with a mesometrial, superficial implantation.

=== Male reproductive tract ===
The testes are intra-abdominal outside the breeding season. During the breeding season they are found in folds of skin at the base of the penis (for all lagomorphs species, the testes are in front of the penis). Similar to other Lagomorphs, Hoffmann's pika does not have a baculum.

== Distribution and habitat ==
=== Distribution ===
Hoffmann's pikas are found in Mongolia. Some reports state that they have also been found in the southeast area of Russia.

=== Habitat ===
The preferred habitat of Hoffmann's pika is rocky areas (e.g. inland cliffs, mountain peaks). Hoffmann's pika is one kind of rock-dwelling pika, which nest among rocks or fallen logs. For other rock-dwelling pikas, the preferred habitat is rock and talus. Hoffmann's pika may be found in old moss-covered scree or in burrows under tree roots.

== Conservation and Decline ==
The primary threat to this species is climate change, as pikas are very sensitive to temperature changes. Pikas can die within six hours after exposure to temperatures above 25.5 °C (77.9 °F). The limited geographic range of Hoffmann's pika, only 600 km^{2} (230 sq mi), puts the species at a greater risk of extinction. While the IUCN lists Hoffmann's pika as an endangered species, there are currently no known conservation efforts underway, perhaps because the ecological consequences that would occur if Hoffmann's pika were to go extinct are not yet determined. The IUCN recommends more research to determine population size and other basic data about the species, which is unavailable at present.
