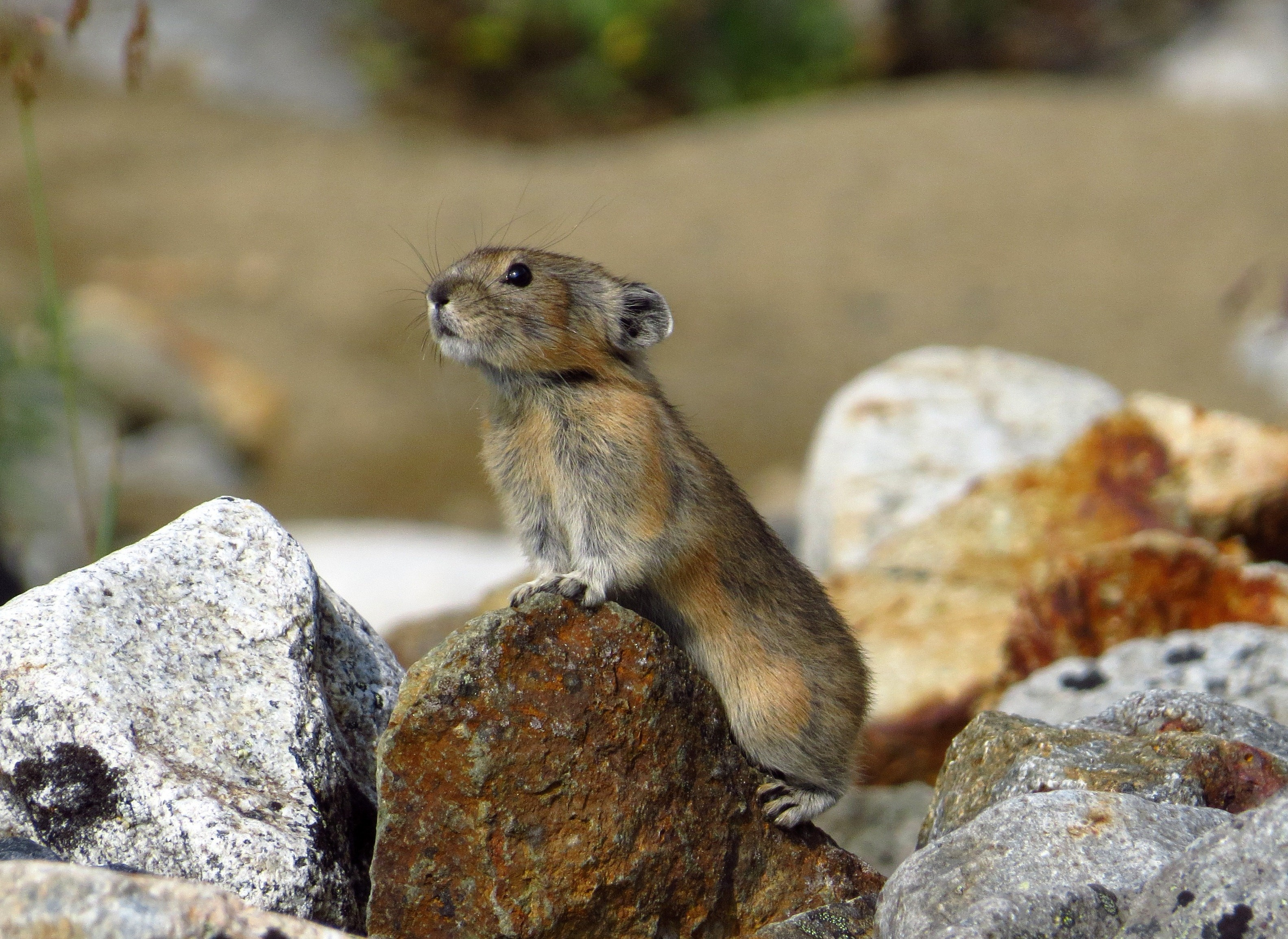

Conservation status
- Least Concern (IUCN 3.1)

Scientific classification
- Kingdom: Animalia
- Phylum: Chordata
- Class: Mammalia
- Order: Lagomorpha
- Family: Ochotonidae
- Genus: Ochotona
- Species: O. hyperborea

Binomial name
- Ochotona hyperborea (Pallas, 1811)
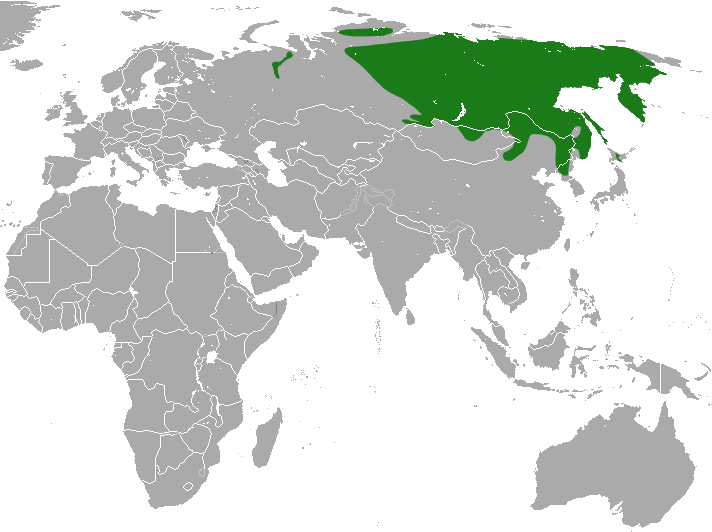
- Northern pika range

= Northern pika =

Species of mammal

The northern pika (Ochotona hyperborea) is a species of pika found across mountainous regions of northern Asia, from the Ural Mountains to northern Japan and south through Mongolia, Manchuria and northern Korea. An adult northern pika has a body length of 12.5–18.5 centimeters (4.9–7.3 in), and a tail of 0.5–1.2 centimeters (0.20–0.47 in). The pika sheds its fur twice annually, bearing a reddish-brown coat in the summer and grayish-brown coat in winter. It feeds on various plant material and makes "hay piles" for winter use.

== Taxonomy ==
There are several subspecies of this pika:

- Ochotona hyperborea cinereoflava
- Ochotona hyperborea coreana
- Ochotona hyperborea ferruginea
- Ochotona hyperborea mantchurica
- Ochotona hyperborea normalis
- Ochotona hyperborea uralesis
- Ochotona hyperborea yesoensis
- Ochotona hyperborea yoshikurai

== Description ==
The northern pika is a small species and grows to a length of between 12.5 and 18.5 centimeters (4.9 and 7.3 in) with a tail of 0.5 to 1.2 centimeters (0.20 to 0.47 in). It has small rounded ears and short legs with five toes on each foot and furry soles. The fine long hair is reddish-brown in summer but much greyer in winter. The underparts are white tinged with reddish-brown and the sexes look alike. It is variable in size and colouring across its extensive range.

== Distribution and habitat ==
The northern pika lives in mountainous regions of eastern Asia. Its range extends from the Urals and the Putorana Plateau, through eastern and southern Siberia, including Sakhalin Island, to northern Mongolia, Manchuria, North Korea and Hokkaido. It is found on scree and on rocky slopes in mountainous areas, in boulder fields, in damp areas among coniferous trees and in dry Alpine meadows. In large areas of rock it is mostly found near the edge and makes shallow burrows in the turf nearby. It occurs at altitudes between 400 and 2,000 metres (1,300 and 6,600 ft). In general it is restricted to higher altitudes than the Alpine pika.

== Behaviour ==
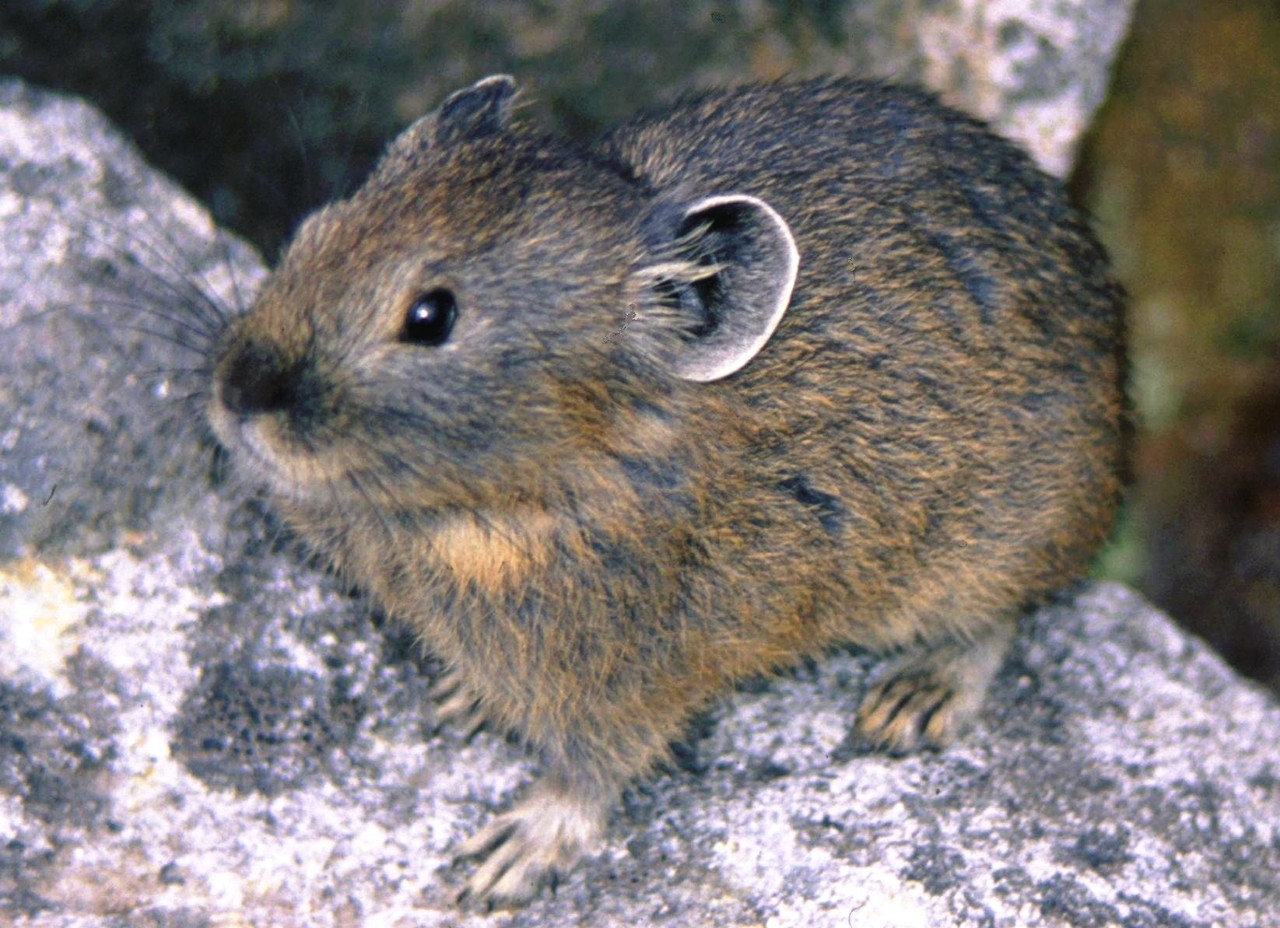
A northern pika (Ochotona hyperborea yesoensis) in Mount Nipesotsu, Japan

Northern pikas are most active and mostly feed soon after dawn and as dusk approaches. They have a network of burrows and also use crevices in the rocks and subterranean runways. Each underground network of passages has numerous entrances and pathways join these with feeding areas on the surface. During their time above ground, their time is spent moving about, feeding, grooming or sitting in a stationary position, usually on some eminence. They mostly move around using short jumps but can also walk and run, and can combine these means of locomotion while agilely climbing over rocks or scaling cliffs. They can stand briefly on their hind legs while sparring or gathering food and can climb in an ungainly fashion in seedling conifers such as the Scots pine (Pinus sylvestris).

The northern pika is herbivorous and eats a variety of plant material such as grasses, twigs, needles, stems and leaves. The food is gathered and then mostly carried back, using the mouth alone, to one of a number of eating points near an entrance to the burrow. When feeding on stems and twigs, a sitting posture is adopted and gnawing starts low down and works upwards. If alarmed while feeding, the pika may dash to its hole, sometimes carrying the food item in its mouth, or remain stationary and alert till the danger passes. It also collects green parts of plants, allows them to dry, and stores them in caches. It has been found that the plants chosen are not those that are the most abundant but are selected species with high nutritive value. Evergreen tuft-forming plants are avoided. These "hay piles" are located in dry locations for consumption during the winter. Northern pikas do not hibernate and can tunnel under the snow to reach their caches and visit areas where there are twigs and other plant material still available.

Some time is spent grooming the fur of the head and face with the forepaws and scratching the head and front part of the body with the hind feet. Apart from settling the fur and removing external parasites, these activities may serve to spread the secretions of the apocrine glands onto the paws for territory marking. Much time is spent loitering in specially selected spots, usually on a prominent rock or tree stump within a few metres (yards) of a hole, for up to ten minutes at a time. On some of these occasions, the pika seems to be sunbathing in a relaxed stance, the animal often turning its head towards the sun, but at other times the animal seems alert and on the look out. The approach of a predator or an observer too closely for comfort causes the animal to scurry away into its hole with a sharp warning cry "Kitz". At certain times, an animal may call from an eminence to other pikas in the area and other individuals may respond. Other shrill calls may be made when sitting or moving around but their significance is unclear.

== Breeding ==
Both male and female northern pikas defend territories. They mark the boundaries by either rubbing a gland on their cheek on a projecting rock or by scent marking with urine. A territory is usually occupied by a pair of pikas but males sometimes stray into other territories. The population is usually stable with one litter of up to nine (usually three or four) offspring being produced each year, though two smaller litters may be produced in the more southerly part of the range. The gestation period is about 28 days and juveniles share their parents' territory for a while before dispersing. It is unclear when they become sexually mature but the life expectancy is about three years.

== Status ==
The northern pika has a very large range and is common within suitable habitat in that range. The population size is relatively stable and no significant threats have been identified so the IUCN lists the species as being of "Least Concern" in its Red List of Threatened Species.
