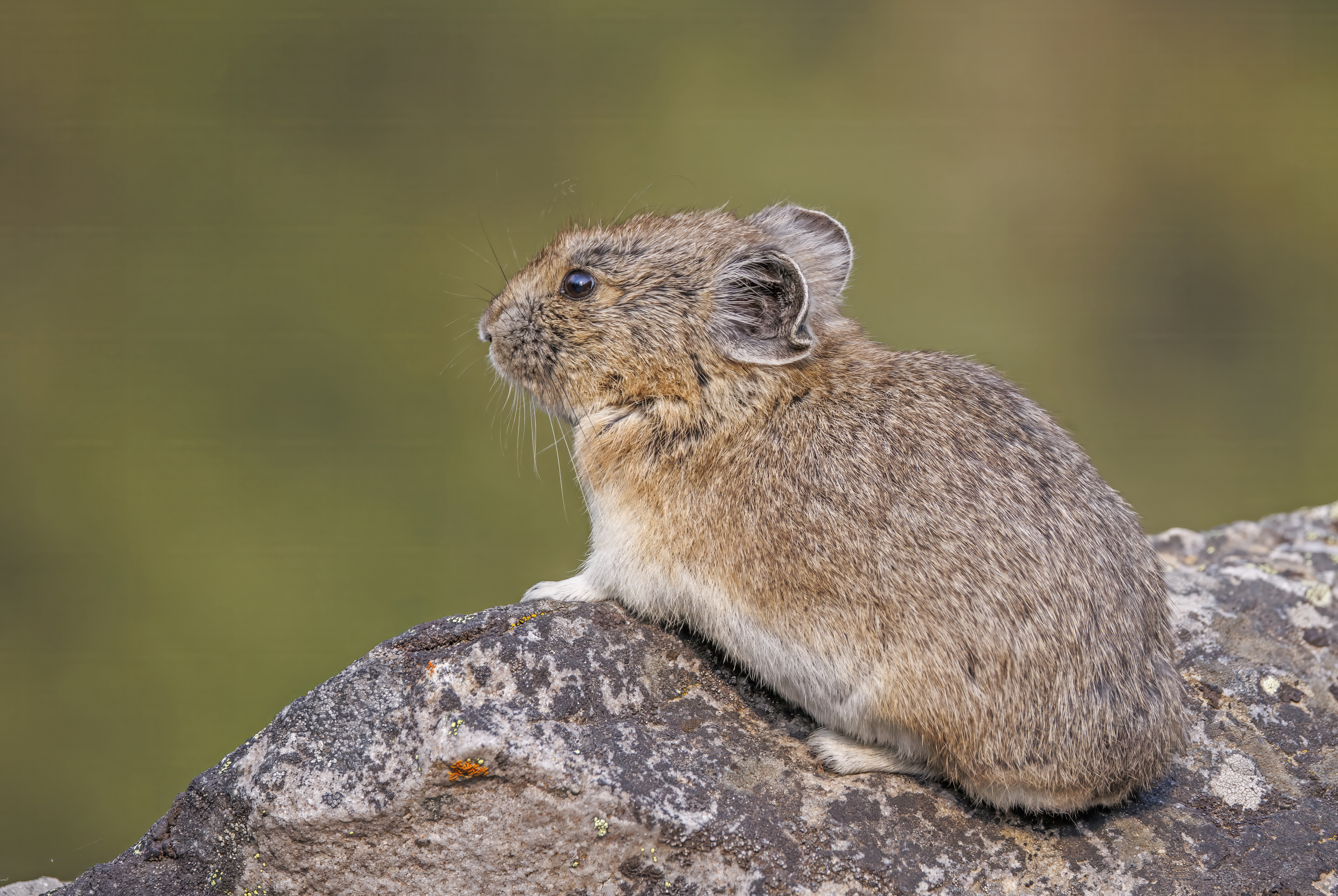
- American pika in Banff National Park, Canada

Scientific classification
- Kingdom: Animalia
- Phylum: Chordata
- Class: Mammalia
- Infraclass: Placentalia
- Order: Lagomorpha
- Family: Ochotonidae; Thomas, 1897

Genera
- See text
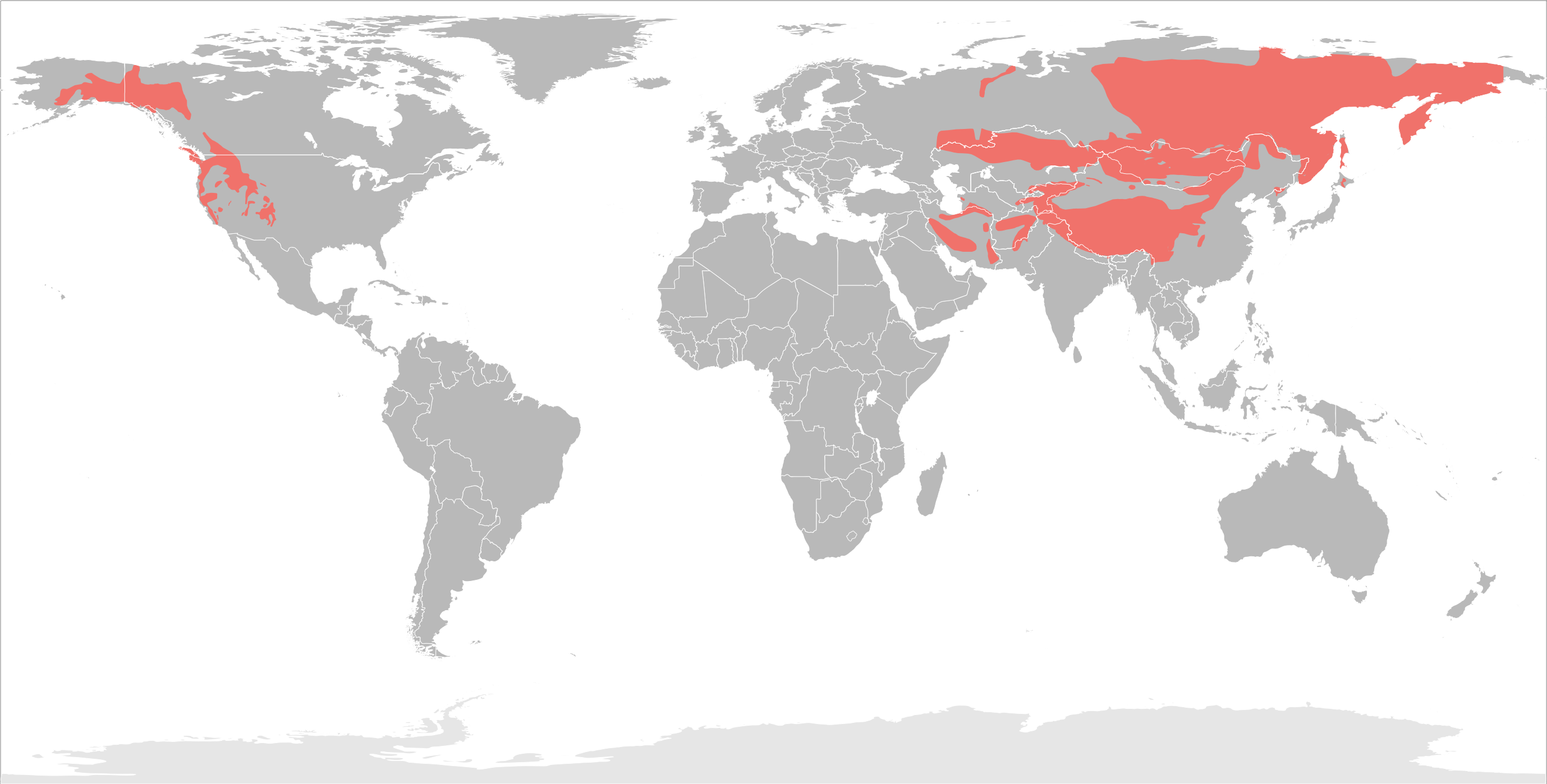
- Ochotonidae distribution

= Ochotonidae =

Ochotonidae Temporal range: Miocene–Holocene, 16.4–0 Ma

Family of lagomorphs

Ochotonidae is a family of small mammals belonging to the order Lagomorpha, which also contains the rabbits and hares. Members of the family are known as ochotonids, or more colloquially as pikas. While the only extant members of the family are those in the genus Ochotona, many extinct species and genera have been assigned to the family. One such genus, Prolagus, may belong to its own family, Prolagidae.

== Taxonomy ==
The following taxa belong to the family Ochotonidae:

- †Amphilagus
- †Bellatona
- †Bohlinotona
- †Cuyamalagus
- †Gripholagomys
- †Hesperolagomys
- Ochotona
- Subfamily †Ochotoninae
  - †Albertona
  - †Alloptox
  - †Lagopsis
  - †Marcuinomys
  - †Ochotonoides
  - †Ochotonoma
  - †Pliolagomys
  - †Proochotona
- †Oklahomalagus
- †Paludotona
- †Piezodus
- †Praotherium palatinum
- †Prolagus
- †Russellagus
- Subfamily †Sinolagomyinae
  - †Austrolagomys
  - †Bellatonoides
  - †Heterolagus
  - †Kenyalagomys
  - †Oreolagus
- †Titanomys
