= Good Hope =

Good Hope or Goodhope can refer to:

== Locations ==
=== United States ===
- Good Hope, Alabama
- Goodhope Bay, a bay in Alaska
- Goodhope River, a river in Alaska
- Good Hope, California
- Good Hope, Georgia
- Good Hope, Illinois
- Good Hope, Louisiana
- Good Hope, Mississippi (disambiguation)
- Good Hope, Ohio
- Good Hope, Washington, D.C., a neighborhood
- Goodhope, West Virginia
- Good Hope, Wisconsin
- Good Hope, U.S. Virgin Islands

=== Elsewhere ===
- Cape of Good Hope, South Africa
- Good Hope, Botswana
- Good Hope, Dominica
- Goodhope, Buffalo City, a village in Buffalo City Metropolitan Municipality, Eastern Cape, South Africa
- Good Hope, Guyana, a village in Guyana
- Good Hope locality, New South Wales, Australia
- Good Hope School, Hong Kong
- Mount Good Hope, officially "Good Hope Mountain", in BC, Canada

== Vessels ==
- HMS Good Hope, several ships of the British Royal Navy, including:
  - HMS Good Hope (1901)

== See also ==
- Cape of Good Hope (disambiguation)
- Order of Good Hope, a knighthood order
- The Good Hope (disambiguation)
