= Giant pika =

Giant pika Temporal range: Lower/Middle Pleistocene to Early Holocene, 1.8–0.01 Ma

Scientific classification
- Kingdom: Animalia
- Phylum: Chordata
- Class: Mammalia
- Order: Lagomorpha
- Family: Ochotonidae
- Genus: Ochotona
- Species: †O. whartoni

Binomial name
- †Ochotona whartoni Guthrie and Matthews, Jr. 1971
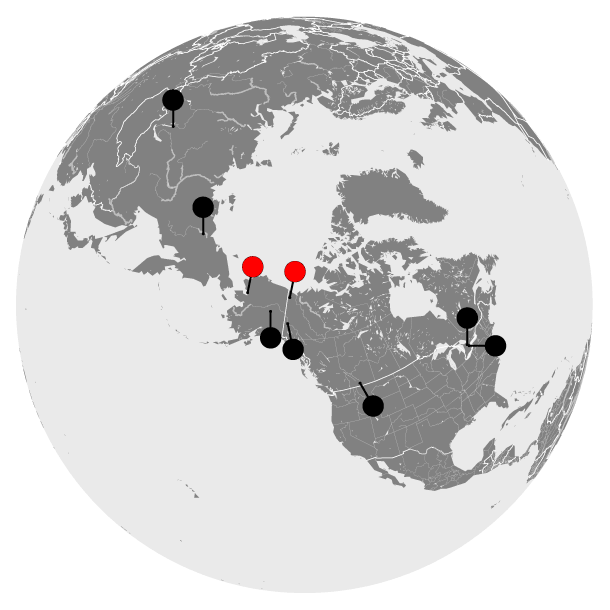
- Fossil distribution of Ochotona whartoni and Ochotona cf. whartoni. Cape Deceit and Old Crow River are red, other sites black.

Extinct species of mammal

The giant pika (Note: Common name: giant pika - i.e. Harington 1978, Harington 2003, Mead 1987, according to Harington 2003 also Mead 1996.) or Wharton's pika (Note: Common name: Wharton's pika - Kurten 1980.) (Ochotona whartoni) is an extinct mammal species in the family Ochotonidae. It lived during the Pleistocene and early Holocene in northern parts of North America (Alaska, US and Canada). (Note: Ochotona whartoni in the Paleobiology Database. (Note: Additional contributors to utilized records of Paleobiology Database (authorizers supplying these records) include John Alroy, Jonathan Marcot.)) Very similar forms have also been found also in Siberia.

== Distribution ==
The giant pika has been found in Alaska (United States), Yukon (O. whartoni and O cf. whartoni, large number of locations), Alberta and Ontario (Canada). A close relative O. whartoni (O. cf. whartoni) is also known from Eastern Siberia and Kolyma.

The ancestors of these pikas migrated from Eurasia to North America during the Early Pleistocene via the Bering Land Bridge, along with another group of small pikas close to the "O. pusilla group". This migration was separate from that of O. spanglei, which entered North America approximately three million years earlier at the Miocene-Pliocene boundary.

=== Detailed fossil distribution ===
- Canada
  - Old Crow River, Yukon, Irvingtonian (1.8 - 0.3 Ma) (Note: The Paleobiology Database collections: Old Crow River Lower OCR 11 (Pleistocene of Canada) and Lower OCR 12 (Pleistocene of Canada).) and Middle Pleistocene (0.8 - 0.1 Ma), (Note: The Paleobiology Database collection: Old Crow River site 14N (Pleistocene of Canada).) O cf. whartoni and O. whartoni.
  - Old Crow River, Yukon, Late/Upper Pleistocene (Late Illinoian-Sangamonian stages)
    (0.1 - 0.0 Ma (Note: The Paleobiology Database collection: Old Crow River Locality 44 (Pleistocene of Canada).) / ~125,000-80,000 BP), at least 10 locations, O. cf. whartoni
  - Thistle Creek, Yukon, Middle Pleistocene (0.8 - 0.1 Ma), O. whartoni (Note: The Paleobiology Database collection: Thistle Creek (Pleistocene of Canada).)
  - Eagle Cave, Alberta, >33,000 BP
  - Elba Cave at Elba, Ontario, 8670±220 BP (the last known occurrence of this species)
  - Kelso Cave, Ontario, Late Wisconsian (>32,000 BP)

The large form of Ochotona was found in 2 of 5 localities in eastern North America.

- United States
  - Cape Deceit, Alaska, Cape Deceit Formation, Irvingtonian (1.8 - 0.3 Ma), O. whartoni, (Note: The Paleobiology Database collection: Cape Deceit (Pleistocene of the United States).")
    (the species was discovered here)
  - Gold Hill Cut at Fairbanks, Alaska
- Russia - only O cf. whartoni
  - From eastern Siberia - Zayarsk site to the Kolyma Range area (Krestovka Sections, Yakutia), in Kolyma from Late Cenozoic
  - Western Siberia, but mentions only Ochotona as occurring there.

== Biology ==
The giant pika is much larger than other North American pikas, but is of a similar size to the extinct early and middle Pleistocene O. complicidens and extant O. koslowi (Koslov's pika), both from China, and may belong to the same species as one of them. Unlike the American pika (O. princeps), which inhabits scree slopes, the giant pika's habitat was largely tundra and steppe, similar to Eurasian pikas.

== Occurrence and extinction ==
The giant pika has been found in North America from the Irvingtonian (1.8–0.3 Ma, Lower–Middle Pleistocene) throughout Middle Pleistocene to Late Pleistocene (0.1–0.0Ma) locations.

The last occurrence of the giant pika is known from early the Holocene of eastern North America (a cave at Elba in the Niagara Escarpment, Ontario) and its radiometric date is 8670±220 years BP (^{14}C age) or 10251-9140 BP (calibrated date). It is possible that it survived in the rocky areas along the Niagara Escarpment as a relict population.
