= Goodhope River =

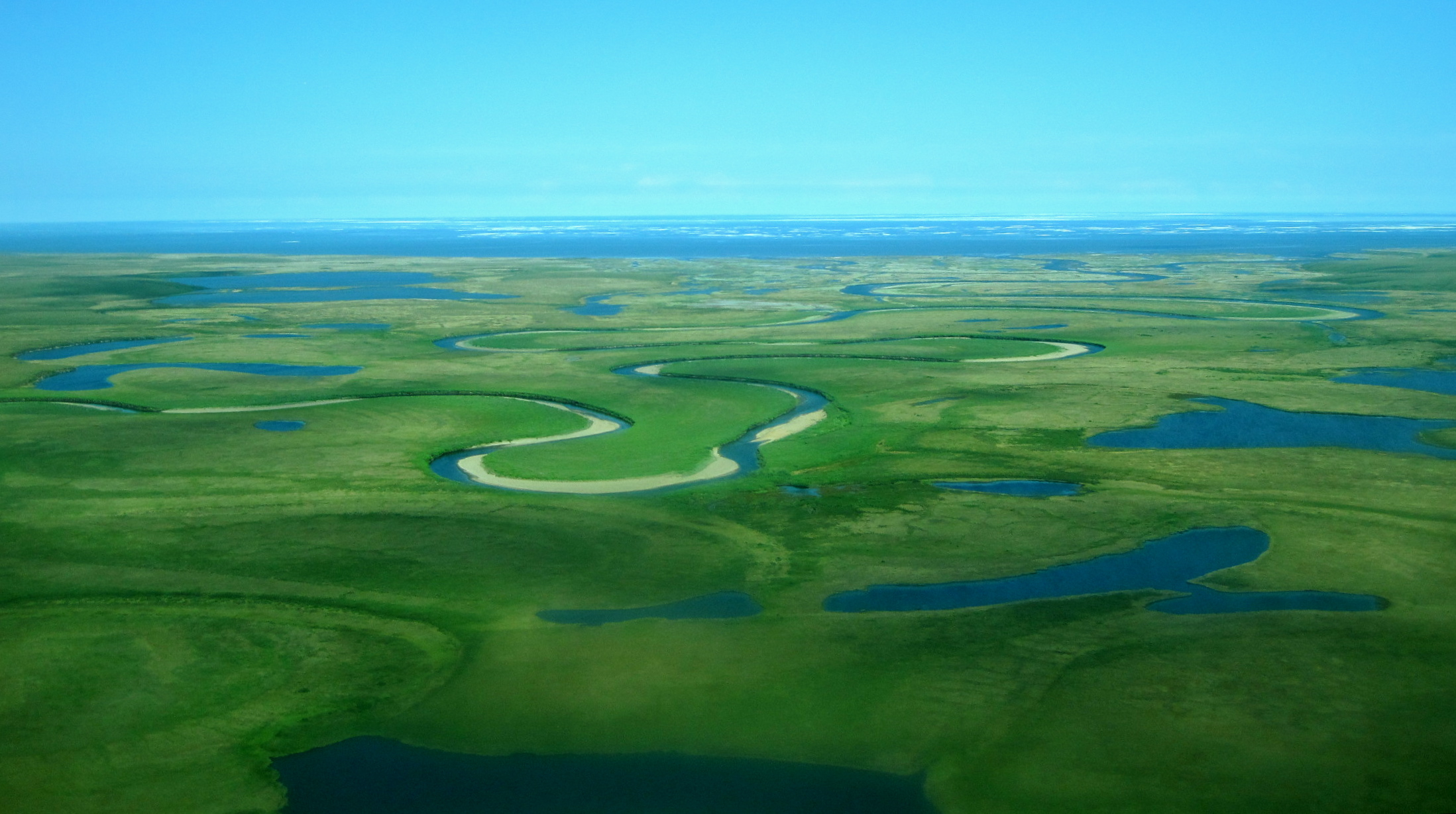

- Location of the mouth of the Goodhope River in Alaska

Location
- Country: United States
- State: Alaska
- Borough: Northwest Arctic

Physical characteristics
- Source: About 5.3 miles (8.5 km) west-southwest of Cloud Lake
  - location: Seward Peninsula
  - coordinates: 65°42′49″N 163°23′18″W
  - elevation: 1,258 ft (383 m)
- Mouth: Goodhope Bay on Kotzebue Sound of the Chukchi Sea
  - location: About 27 miles (43 km) west of Cape Deceit and Deering
  - coordinates: 66°04′29″N 163°44′17″W
  - elevation: 0 ft (0 m)
- Length: 46 mi (74 km)

The Goodhope River is a stream, 46 miles (74 km) long, on the Seward Peninsula in the U.S. state of Alaska. It heads about 5.3 miles (8.5 km) west-southwest of Cloud Lake and flows generally northeast to Goodhope Bay on Kotzebue Sound of the Chukchi Sea. The river mouth is about 27 miles (43 km) west of Cape Deceit and Deering in the Northwest Arctic Borough. The entire course of the river lies within the Bering Land Bridge National Preserve.

The river name derives from "Goodhope Bay". Explorer Otto von Kotzebue assigned the name to the bay, which he visited in 1816, because he had good hope of making important geographic discoveries in the region. The river's Inupiat name was reported in 1998 as Pittam Kuurua.

== See also ==
- List of rivers of Alaska
