= Cape of Good Hope (disambiguation) =

The Cape of Good Hope is a rocky headland on the Atlantic coast of South Africa.

Cape of Good Hope may also refer to:

- Dutch Cape Colony, a colony of the Dutch East India Company in present-day South Africa
- Colony of the Cape of Good Hope, more commonly called the Cape Colony, a former British colony in present-day South Africa and Namibia, that succeeded the Dutch Cape Colony
- Province of the Cape of Good Hope, more commonly Cape Province, a province in the Union of South Africa, and subsequently the Republic of South Africa, that replaced the Cape Colony
- University of the Cape of Good Hope, now the University of South Africa (Unisa)
- Cape of Good Hope (film), a 2004 South African comedy drama film
- Cape of Good Hope (horse), a British Thoroughbred racehorse
- MV Cape of Good Hope, a British cargo ship

== See also ==
- Good Hope (disambiguation)
- Cape of Good Hope race, obsolete system of human racial classification proposed by Louis Agassiz
- Cape of Good Hope Station, a former British Royal Navy Station
- Order of Good Hope, officially Order of the Cape of Good Hope, a knighthood order
- Cape Of Good Films, Indian film production company owned by Akshay Kumar
- Cape (disambiguation)
