= The Good Hope =

The Good Hope may refer to:

- The Good Hope (play), a 1900/1901 Dutch play by Herman Heijermans
- The Good Hope (novel), a 1964 novel by William Heinesen

== See also ==
- Good Hope (disambiguation)
- Op Hoop van Zegen (disambiguation)
