= Collared pika =

- In Alaska

Conservation status
- Least Concern (IUCN 3.1)

- Secure (NatureServe)

Scientific classification
- Kingdom: Animalia
- Phylum: Chordata
- Class: Mammalia
- Order: Lagomorpha
- Family: Ochotonidae
- Genus: Ochotona
- Species: O. collaris

Binomial name
- Ochotona collaris (E. W. Nelson, 1893)
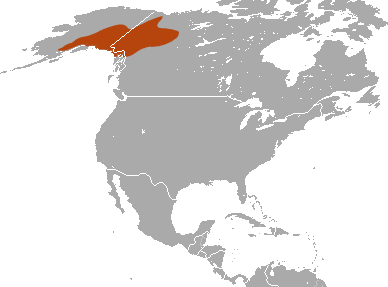
- Collared pika range

Species of mammal

The collared pika (Ochotona collaris) is a species of mammal in the pika family, Ochotonidae, and part of the order Lagomorpha, which comprises rabbits, hares, and pikas. It is a small (about 160 g (5.6 oz)) alpine lagomorph that lives in boulder fields of central and southern Alaska (U.S.), and in parts of Canada, including northern British Columbia, Yukon, and western parts of the Northwest Territories. It is closely related to the American pika (O. princeps), but it is a monotypic form containing no recognized subspecies. The name comes from distinctive patches of grayish fur on its nape and shoulders that form a "collar." It is asocial, does not hibernate, and spends a large part of its time in the summer collecting vegetation that is stored under rocks ("haypiles") as a supply of food for the winter. Some individuals have been observed collecting and consuming dead birds as sources of fat and protein. Thousands of trips are made during July and August to collect vegetation for winter.

== Fossil record ==
In 1973, within the Pleistocene deposits in central Alaska, preserved specimens of collared pika were found along with some dung pellets; the Yukon territory also contained some early fossilized specimens. The studies of the size variation of the fossils showed that the morphology of Pleistocene pikas was flexible with the alteration of environments from early to middle Pleistocene in both Alaska and Yukon. During the isolation of the Wisconsin glaciation, O. collaris may have become its own species separate from O. princeps.

== Distribution and habitat ==
O. collaris is distributed over a wide range of terrain that encompasses the west side of the Northwest Territories, almost all of the Yukon Territory, northern British Columbia, and the central and southern parts of Alaska. Around 60% of collared pikas are found in regions of Canada, with most of them being in Yukon. More specifically, in Alaska, they occur most frequently in ranges around the Yukon-Tanana uplands and Chigmit Mountains, to the head of Lynn Canal near Skagway. In Canada, they occur from Richardson Mountains, south into northwestern British Columbia and west close to the Mackenzie River of the Northwest Territories. Of the 30 existing species of pika, only two inhabit North America, O. collaris and O. princeps. In relation to the location of distribution of O. princeps, O. collaris is located farther north of those regions and is separated by 800 km (500 mi). This gap occurs in both British Columbia and Alberta, Canada.

Collared pika colonies are mainly found in the mountain regions and they typically inhabit rock slides near areas of vegetation and fields of meadows. Some collared pikas have been found living in rock piles on the isolated nunataks of Denali National Park. Due to these talus sites, the species' range distribution is broken into several condensed areas.

== Description ==
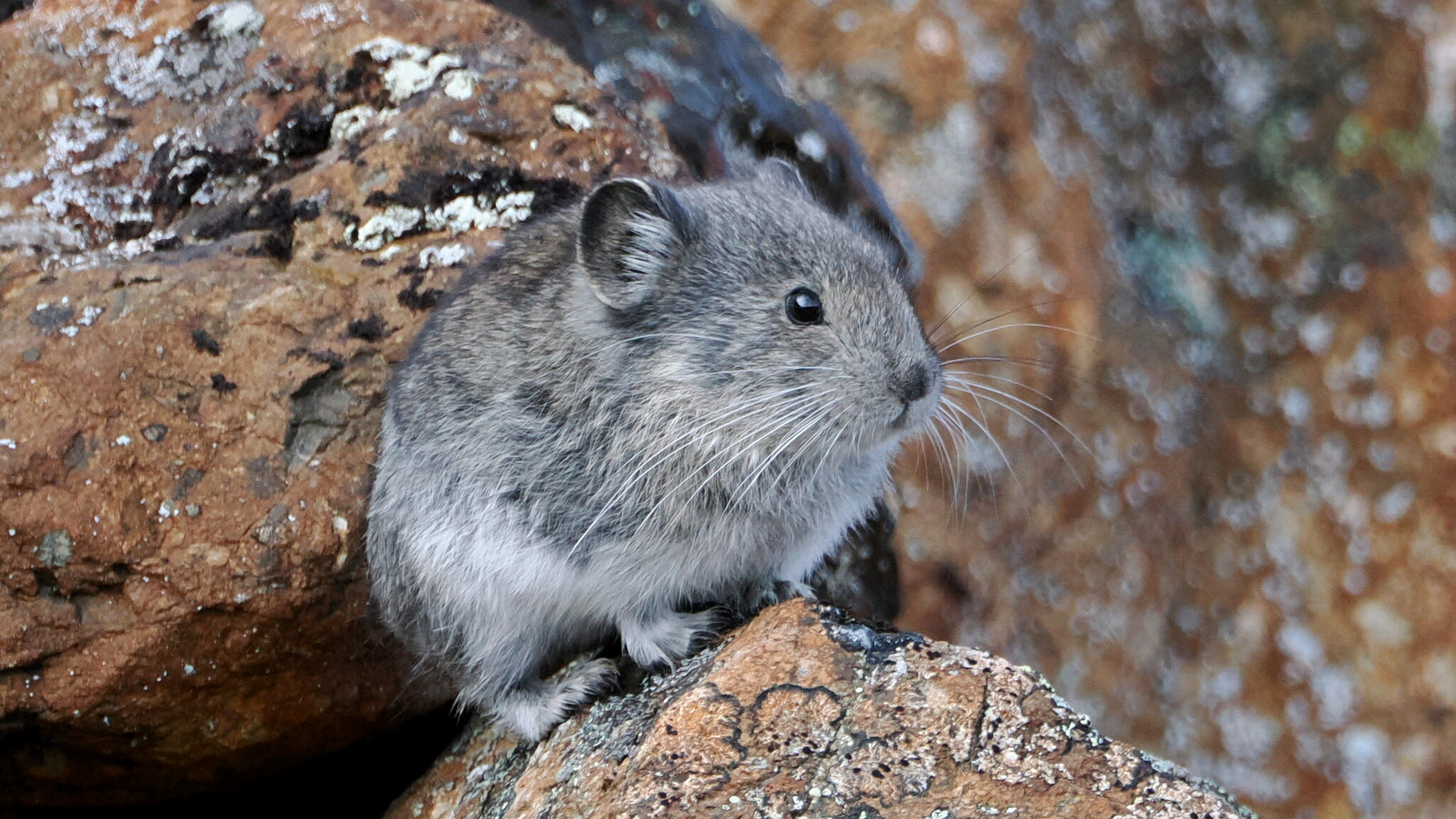
Near O'Malley Peak, in Alaska

The appearance of collared pikas is similar to other members of the genus Ochotona. On the dorsal side of their bodies, they have dull grayish fur with gray patches on their shoulders and nape creating an indistinct collar, while on the ventral side they have opaque, white-colored fur. Their winter pelts are similar to O. princeps, but during the other seasons, O. collaris' fur is a darker gray and is less thick than in the winter; They only have one annual molt. During the summer, young that resemble the size of an adult are fully gray, while actual adults are tinged brown around their heads and necks. Some features that are helpful in identifying O. collaris from O. princeps are the creamy-colored fur over the facial gland, which is brown in O. princeps. Also, the skull size of O. collaris is broader, with a shorter nasal area, a greater tympanic bullae, and different teeth morphology than those of O. princeps.

In the Yukon

They are petite in size with longer hind limbs than their fore limbs, with their hind limbs being about 2.9 to 3.1 cm (1.1 to 1.2 in). They have five digits on each front foot and only four on each hind foot. The soles of their feet are covered with long fur, while still exposing their digital pads on the soles of their feet. They have curved claws. They range between 130 and 200 g (4.6 and 7.1 oz) in body mass and 17.8 to 19.8 cm (7.0 to 7.8 in) in length. For both male and females, the average weight is around 157 g (5.5 oz), with maximum growth rates increasing moving toward the northern parts of collared pika territories. They have constricted, flat skulls with no supraorbital processes, slender zygomatic arches, and 26 teeth. While some mammals have reduced clavicles for more range of motion, the collared pika has a well-developed clavicle supporting the scapula. They do not have a pubic symphysis, therefore it does not have a pubic arch within its pelvic girdle. In addition, an interesting characteristic about the male collared pika is that it has no scrotum and the location of its testes is not visibly apparent. This indicates no sexual dimorphism; consequently, one must examine the pseudocloaca for evidence of specific genitalia to distinguish the sex of the collared pika.

== Behavior and ecology ==
Collecting food, in Alaska

Collared pikas are diurnal herbivores and spend time foraging through vegetation during the summer. The process of gathering and foraging for vegetation to add to their caches is referred to as "haying", which is what they spend most of the day doing. They spend no time burrowing because they use their talus sites for protection and habitation. They are most active during the morning and late afternoon. Each individual within this species preserves its own territory and its own vegetation cache or haypile, and defends it with full force. Therefore, the collared pika is seen as an asocial species and prefers solitude. During the cold winters, the collared pika does not hibernate, but instead stays active, counting on its food sources for energy and survival, and uses the snowpack as a means of insulation.

Collared pika home ranges are about 30 m (98 ft) in diameter. Caches and dens are about 30 to 70 m (98 to 230 ft) apart. The way organisms respond to climate change can be a distinct and peculiar characteristic, so patterns between closely related species, such as the collared pika and the American pika, are important. Collared pikas, like most other pikas, choose to live around rock slides to use the rocks as protection against the high temperatures they must endure throughout the day; they are referred to as cold-adapted lagomorphs. The distance in which the collared pika ventures out to forage is highly dependent on level of predation risk. When gathering food, pika rarely travels more than 10 m (33 ft) away from its talus site. Gathering begins to take place around the end of June or beginning of July and increases at a constant rate as time progresses. Collared pikas tend to have multiple haystacks of vegetation throughout their home range and often put the haystacks in the same location each year. However, although it has multiple haystacks, it mainly focuses on one while the others are much smaller and localized caches. As observed, collared pikas are likely to use whatever is near the rockslides, such as leaves, flowering plants, berries, or anything else they can find to add to their food caches; even feces of other animals have been found within the haystacks of collared pikas. The size of the food cache depends on the size of the shelter. This species is often kleptoparasitic and takes food from others. During their rest periods, collared pikas have been found to sit on rocks and expose themselves to the sunlight.

=== Predation ===
Collared pikas are defenseless against predators and can only hide within cracks or crevices in the mountainous areas where they live; the rocks of the terrain are their only shelter. One of the main predators of the collared pika found in south-central Alaska is the stoat, but martens, weasels, foxes, eagles, coyotes, and various birds also contribute to predation. Collared pikas have also been found to be the victims of parasitism by fleas and parasitic helminthes, including some species of Sarcocystis, which have been found in their striated muscles.

=== Reproduction ===
Collared pikas generally mate with their nearest neighbors and are believed to be facultatively monogamous, but they have also been predicted to participate in polygynandry and reproduce with multiple partners, because males often travel to territories of several females during the spring before mating season begins. The males receive the females around the end of spring. However, the pinnacle of the mating season arises in May and early June. Collared pikas, both male and female, are reproductively developed at one year of age. The female gives birth to two or three young each year in her nest within the talus. She typically produces one litter per year, but may produce two litters without successful weaning. Although both can reproduce at one year of age, the male's reproductive success is reliant on acquiring habitat and drawing females. The female is the one that yields the most parental investment and is burdened by energetic constraints during gestation and lactation. Lack of sexual dimorphism makes perceiving how much the male invests in nurturing the young difficult.

The female's gestation period lasts about 30 days and produces a litter of blind and almost hairless offspring. The young remain in the nest around 30 days before they are weaned and emerge to the surface. Juveniles remain on the natal territory for only a short time (a few days) before they become independent and disperse to find their own territories. Juvenile pikas can achieve the size of an adult around 40 to 50 days. Parturition timing for northern alpine herbivores is vital due to the brief snow-free timeframe and lack of food sources. The parturition time of most collared pikas is often synchronous in terms of breeding; however, there has been a study that has identified some correlation between variation in initiating the first litter and the variation of timing of the snowmelt. Upon finding some asynchronous breeding among pikas, due to not being able to predict snowmelt, this type of breeding could ensure some success in breeding.

=== Longevity ===
The lifespan of O. collaris can be up to 7 years in the wild. The mortality rate is high during winter and they have suffered from a continuous reduction of population over time. The struggle to survive the winters and the fast-rate climate variations have affected their growing season and availability of resources, especially from the negative impact of not having snowpacks to keep them insulated or to keep their food and shelters hidden from predators.

=== Communication ===
Collared pikas are a fairly vocal species. Not much is known about the vocalization of collared pikas, but many studies on the American pika indicate a function of both a defensive mechanism and a warning signal against predators. As a collared pika prepares to call, it sits with a hunched back and points its nose upward. Collared pika calls sound like a recurring single sharp note with each series varying in loudness and is similar to the American pika's short call. When interacting on a territory, collared pikas use a softer call than their normal vocalizations. Both males and females can emit vocalizations from some sort of fixed position within their home ranges, especially during the period of gathering. This territorial call informs neighboring collared pikas of haypile possession. Adult males specifically have their own call that sounds like a strong series of "kie" calls and clicking during mating season.

== Conservation status ==
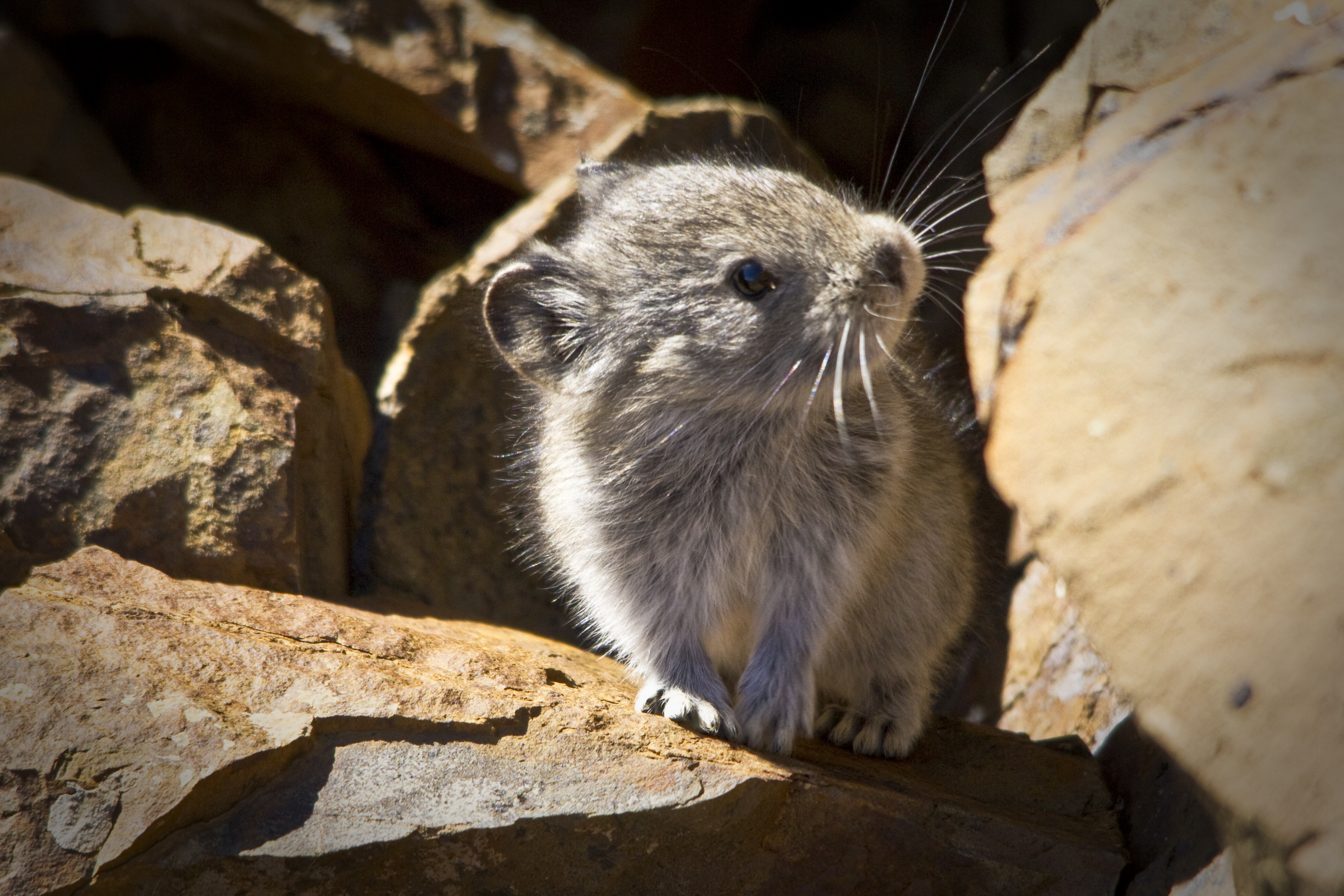
A collared pika in Denali State Park

The estimated population density is roughly around 6.4 to 7.2 individuals per hectare (2.6 to 2.9/acre). In various regions of the Yukon, the range is around 1 to 4 individuals per hectare (0.40 to 1.62/acre). Both collared pikas and American pikas are commonly believed to be philopatric species. In addition, research data have shown that young collared pikas rarely disperse over 300 m (980 ft) away from their original den, and adults hardly ever leave an established territory. No population trend is known, but the population of collared pikas has experienced a decline since 1995 in the Yukon area, and is proposed to have a higher probability of extinction within that specific area in 10 to 15 years. Due to collared pikas being a cold-adapted species, their resilience to climate change is limited, so they have a high risk of extirpation of any populations found at lower altitudes and lower in latitude. Consequently, collared pikas have been recognized as an indicator species for the effect of climate change on alpine ecosystems.

O. collaris has been classified as a least-concern species by the IUCN Red List of Threatened Species, yet as said by the Committee on the Status of Endangered Wildlife in Canada, as a result of collared pikas inhabiting areas with fast climate changes and their sensitivity to climatic variation, they are considered of special concern. Currently, no actions are being taken to preserve this species, and no threats have been acknowledged against it. The collared pika may be susceptible to the negative effects of climate change, and investigations have been recommended to monitor the negative effects of the unlimited, year-round hunting rules in Alaska that allow for the hunting of collared pikas.
