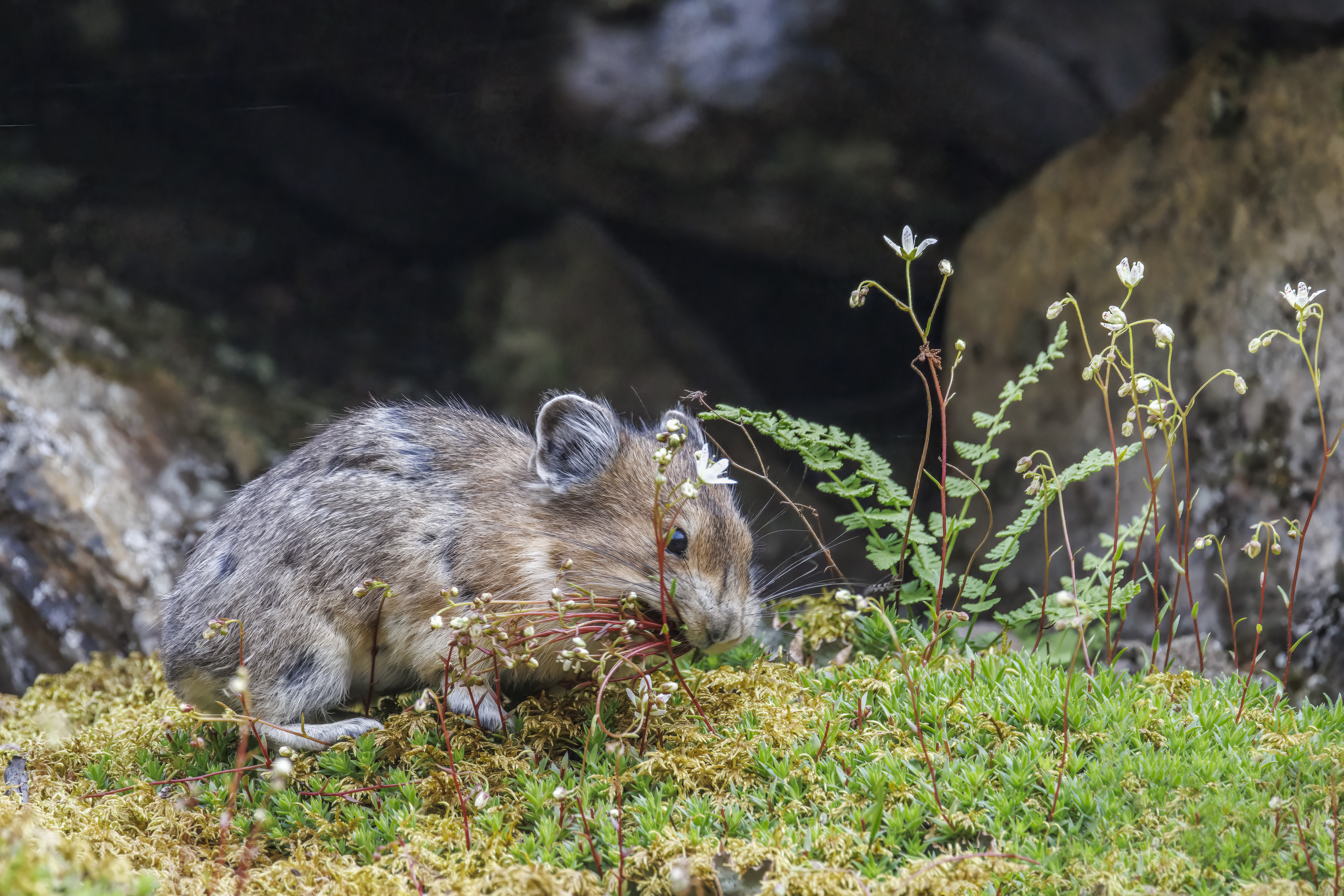
- American pika (Ochotona princeps)

Scientific classification
- Kingdom: Animalia
- Phylum: Chordata
- Class: Mammalia
- Order: Lagomorpha
- Family: Ochotonidae
- Genus: Ochotona; Link, 1795

Type species
- Ochotona daurica Link, 1795 (Lepus dauuricus Pallas, 1776)

Species
- See text
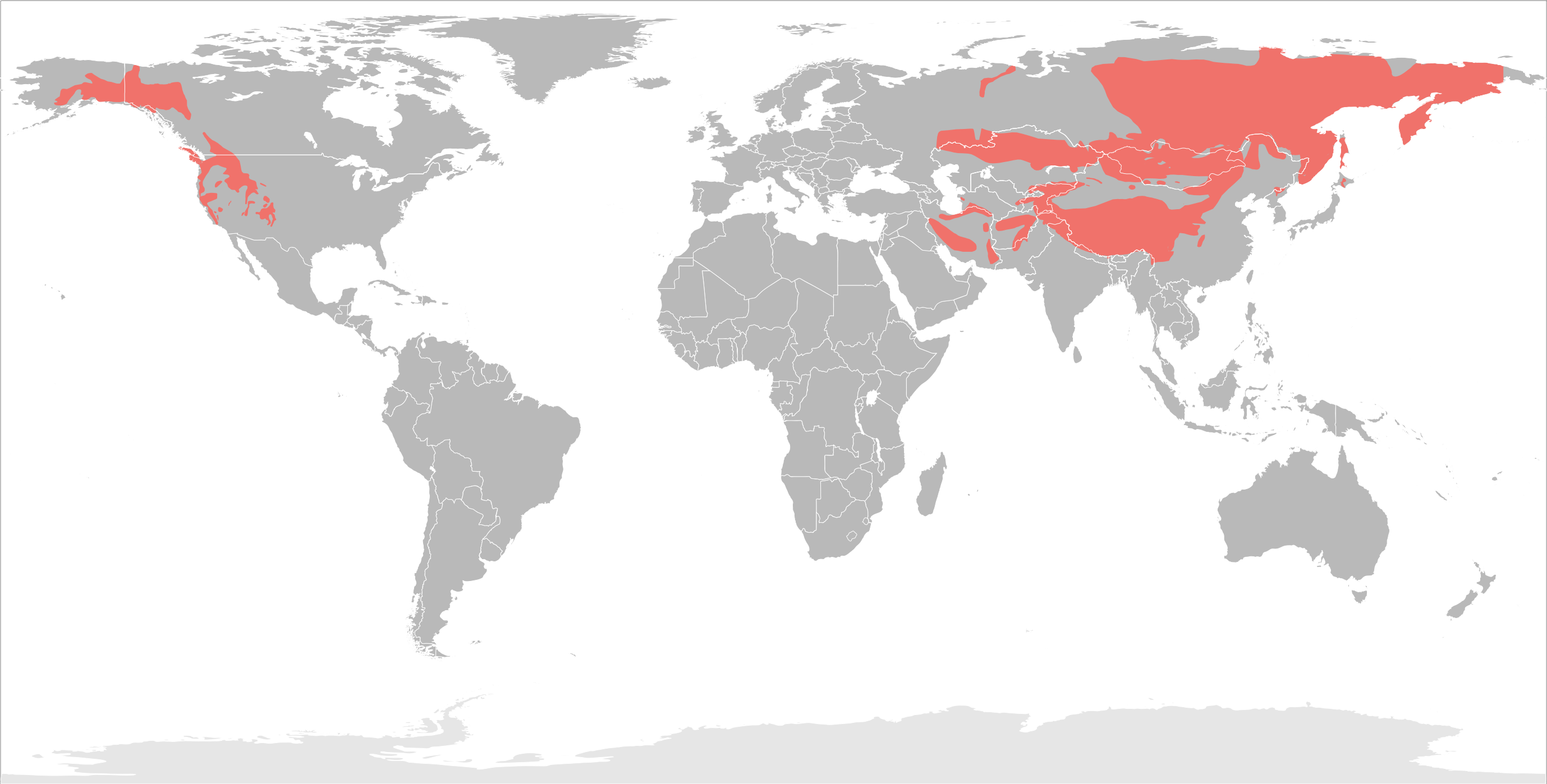
- Global distribution of pikas

= Pika =

Pika Temporal range: Miocene–Holocene, 16.4–0 Ma

Genus of mountain-dwelling mammal

A pika (/ˈpaɪkə/ PY-kə, /ˈpiːkə/ PEE-kə) is a small, mountain-dwelling mammal native to Asia and North America. With short limbs, a very round body, an even coat of fur, and no external tail, they resemble their close relative the rabbit, but with short, rounded ears. The large-eared pika of the Himalayas and nearby mountains lives at elevations of more than 6,000 m (20,000 ft).

The name pika appears to be derived from the Tungusic piika, and the scientific name Ochotona is derived from the Mongolian word ogotno (оготно), which means 'pika'. It is used for any member of the Ochotonidae, a family within the order of lagomorphs, the order which also includes the Leporidae (rabbits and hares). They are the smallest animal in the lagomorph group. Only one genus, Ochotona (/ˌɒkəˈtoʊnə/ OK-ə-TOHN-ə), is extant within the family, covering 37 species, though many fossil genera are known. Another species, the Sardinian pika, belonging to the separate genus Prolagus, has become extinct within the last 2,000 years owing to human activity.

Pikas prefer rocky slopes and graze on a range of plants, primarily grasses, flowers, and young stems. In the autumn, they pull hay, soft twigs, and other stores of food under rocks to eat during the long, cold winter. The pika is also known as the whistling hare because of its high-pitched alarm call it gives when alarmed. The two species found in North America are the American pika, found primarily in the mountains of the western United States and far southwestern Canada, and the collared pika of northern British Columbia, the Yukon, western Northwest Territories and Alaska.

== Habitat ==
Pikas are native to cold climates in Asia and North America. Most species live on rocky mountain sides, where numerous crevices are available for their shelter, although some pikas also construct crude burrows. A few burrowing species are native to open steppe land. In the mountains of Eurasia, pikas often share their burrows with snowfinches, which build their nests there. Changing temperatures have forced some pika populations to restrict their ranges to even higher elevations.

== Characteristics ==
Pikas are small mammals, with short limbs and rounded ears. They are about 15 to 23 cm (5.9 to 9.1 in) in body length and weigh between 120 and 350 g (4.2 and 12.3 oz), depending on species.

Collared pika collecting food, in Alaska

These animals are herbivores and feed on a wide variety of plant matter, including forbs, grasses, sedges, shrub twigs, moss and lichens. Easily digestible food is processed in the gastrointestinal tract and expelled as regular feces. But in order to get nutrients out of hard to digest fiber, pika ferment fiber in the cecum (in the GI tract) and then expel the contents as soft pellets, or cecotropes, which are reingested. This process is known as cecotrophy, and is a common behavior among all lagomorphs. Nutrients from the cecotropes are absorbed in the small intestine after consumption.

Collared pikas have been known to store dead birds in their burrows for food during winter and eat the feces of other animals.

As with other lagomorphs, pikas have gnawing incisors and no canines, although they have fewer molars than rabbits. They have a dental formula of 2.0.3.21.0.2.3 = 26. Another similarity that pikas share with other lagomorphs is that the bottom of their paws are covered with fur and lack paw pads.

Rock-dwelling pikas have small litters of fewer than five young, whilst the burrowing species tend to give birth to more young and to breed more frequently, possibly owing to a greater availability of resources in their native habitats. The young are born altricial (eyes and ears closed, no fur) after a gestation period of between 25 and 30 days.

== Activity ==
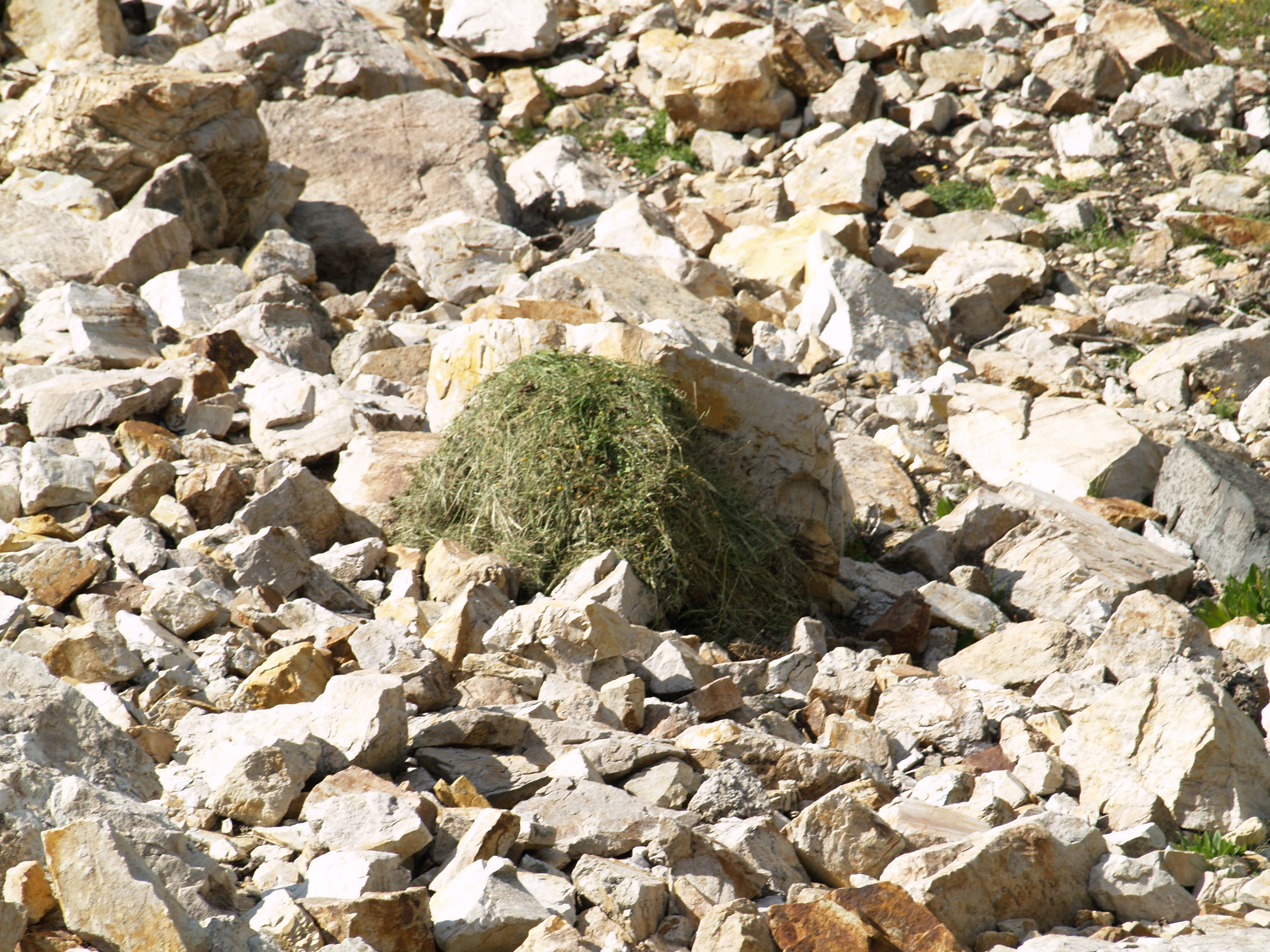
Vegetation pile drying on rocks for subsequent storage, Little Cottonwood Canyon, Utah

Pikas are active during daylight (diurnal) or twilight hours (crepuscular), with higher-elevation species generally being more active during the daytime. They show their peak activity just before the winter season. Pikas do not hibernate and remain active throughout the winter by traveling in tunnels under rocks and snow and eating dried plants that they have stored. Rock-dwelling pikas exhibit two methods of foraging: the first involves direct consumption of food, and the second is characterized by the gathering of plants to store in a "haypile" of cached plants.

The impact of human activity on the tundra ecosystems where pikas live has been recorded dating back to the 1970s. Rather than hibernate during winter, pikas forage for grasses and other forms of plant matter and stash these findings in protected dens in a process called "haying". They eat the dried plants during the winter. When pikas mistake humans as predators, they may respond to humans as they do to other species that do prey on pikas. Such interactions with humans have been linked to pikas having reduced amounts of foraging time, consequentially limiting the amount of food they can stockpile for winter months. Pikas prefer foraging in temperatures below 25 °C (77 °F), so they generally spend their time in shaded regions and out of direct sunlight when temperatures are high. A link has also been found between temperature increases and lost foraging time, where for every increase of 1 °C (1.8 °F) to the ambient temperature in alpine landscapes home to pikas, those pikas lose 3% of their foraging time.

Eurasian pikas commonly live in family groups and share duties of gathering food and keeping watch. Some species are territorial. North American pikas (O. princeps and O. collaris) are asocial, leading solitary lives outside the breeding season.

== Vocalization ==
Pikas have distinct calls, which vary in duration. The call can be short and quick, a little longer and more drawn out or long songs. The short calls are an example of geographic variation. The pikas determine the appropriate time to make short calls by listening for cues for sound localization. The calls are used for individual recognition, predator warning signals, territory defense, or as a way to attract potential mates. There are also different calls depending on the season. In the spring the songs become more frequent during the breeding season. In late summer the vocalizations become short calls. Through various studies, the acoustic characteristics of the vocalizations can be a useful taxonomic tool.

== Lifespan ==
The average lifespan of pikas in the wild is roughly seven years. A pika's age may be determined by the number of adhesion lines on the periosteal bone on the lower jaw. The lifespan does not differ between the sexes.

== Taxonomy ==
The 29 extant species of pika currently recognized are:

- Order Lagomorpha
  - Family Ochotonidae: pikas
    - Genus Ochotona
      - Subgenus Conothoa: mountain pikas
        - Chinese red pika, O. erythrotis
        - Forrest's pika, O. forresti
        - Glover's pika, O. gloveri
        - Ili pika, O. iliensis
        - Koslov's pika, O. koslowi
        - Ladak pika, O. ladacensis
        - Large-eared pika, O. macrotis
        - Royle's pika, O. roylei
        - Turkestan red pika, O. rutila
      - Subgenus Ochotona: shrub-steppe pikas
        - Gansu pika or gray pika, O. cansus
        - Plateau pika or black-lipped pika, O. curzoniae
        - Daurian pika, O. dauurica
        - Nubra pika, O. nubrica
        - Steppe pika, O. pusilla
        - Afghan pika, O. rufescens
        - Tsing-ling pika, O. syrinx
        - Moupin pika, O. thibetana
        - Thomas's pika, O. thomasi
      - Subgenus Pika: northern pikas
        - Alpine pika or Altai pika, O. alpina
        - Helan Shan pika or silver pika, O. argentata
        - Collared pika, O. collaris
        - Korean pika, O. coreana
        - Hoffmann's pika, O. hoffmanni
        - Northern pika or Siberian pika, O. hyperborea
        - Manchurian pika, O. mantchurica
        - Kazakh pika, O. opaca
        - Pallas's pika, O. pallasii
        - American pika, O. princeps
        - Turuchan pika, O. turuchanensis

=== Extinct species ===
Many fossil forms of Ochotona are described in the literature, from the Miocene epoch to the early Holocene (extinct species) and present (16.4-0 Ma). They lived in Europe, Asia, and North America.Some species listed below are common for Eurasia and North America (O. gromovi, O. tologoica, O. zazhigini, and probably O. whartoni).

- Eurasia
  - large forms
    - †Ochotona chowmincheni (China: Baode area, late Miocene)
    - †Ochotona gromovi (Asia, Pliocene, see also North America)
    - †Ochotona gudrunae (China: Shanxi, early Pleistocene)
    - †Ochotona guizhongensis (Tibet, late Miocene)
    - †Ochotona lagreli (China: Inner Mongolia, late Miocene to late Pliocene)
    - †Ochotona magna (China, early Pleistocene)
    - †Ochotona tologoica (Transbaikalia, Pliocene, see also North America)
    - †Ochotona transcaucasica (Transcaucasia: eastern Georgia and Azerbaijan, Transbaikal and probably southern Europe, early to late Pleistocene)
    - †Ochotona ursui (Romania, Pliocene)
    - †Ochotona zasuchini (Transbaikalia, Pleistocene)
    - †Ochotona zazhigini (Asia, Pliocene, see also North America)
    - †Ochotona zhangi (China, Pleistocene)
  - medium-sized forms
    - †Ochotona agadjianiani (Asia, Pliocene)
    - †Ochotona antiqua (Moldavia, Ukraine, and the Russian Plain, Caucasus, and probably Rhodes, late Miocene to Pliocene)
    - †Ochotona azerica (Transcaucasia: Azerbaijan, middle Pliocene)
    - †Ochotona lingtaica (Asia, Pliocene)
    - †Ochotona dodogolica (Asia: western Transbaikalia, Pleistocene)
    - †Ochotona nihewanica (China: Hebei, early Pleistocene)
    - †Ochotona plicodenta (Asia, Pliocene)
    - †Ochotona polonica (Europe: Poland, Germany, France, Pliocene)
  - small-sized forms
    - †Ochotona bazarovi (Asia, upper Pliocene)
    - †Ochotona dehmi (Germany: Schernfeld, Pleistocene)
    - †Ochotona filippovi (Siberia, Pleistocene)
    - †Ochotona gracilis (Asia, Pliocene)
    - †Ochotona horaceki (Slovakia: Honce, Pleistocene)
    - †Ochotona minor (China, late Miocene)
    - †Ochotona sibirica (Asia, Pliocene)
    - †Ochotona valerotae (France: Valerots site, Pleistocene)
    - †Ochotona youngi (Asia, Pliocene)
      and others.
  - other examples
    - †Ochotona agadzhaniani (Transcaucasia: Armenia, Pliocene)
    - †Ochotona alaica (Asia: Kyrgyzstan, Pleistocene)
    - †Ochotona (Proochotona) eximia (Moldova, Ukraine, Russia, Kazakhstan, Miocene to Pliocene)
    - †Ochotona (Proochotona) gigas (Ukraine, Pliocene)
    - †Ochotona gureevi (Transbaikalia, middle Pliocene)
    - †Ochotona hengduanshanensis (China, Pleistocene)
    - †Ochotona intermedia (Asia, Pliocene)
    - †Ochotona (Proochotona) kalfaense (Europe: Moldova, Miocene)
    - †Ochotona (Proochotona) kirgisica (Asia: Kyrgyzstan, Pliocene)
    - †Ochotona kormosi (Hungary, Pleistocene)
    - †Ochotona (Proochotona) kurdjukovi (Asia: Kyrgyzstan, Pliocene)
    - †Ochotona largerli (Georgia, Pleistocene)
    - †Ochotona lazari (Ukraine, Pleistocene)
    - †Ochotona mediterranensis (Turkey, Pliocene)
    - †Ochotona ozansoyi (Turkey, Miocene)
    - †Ochotona pseudopusilla (Ukraine and Russian Plain, Pleistocene)
    - †Ochotona spelaeus (Ukraine, late Pleistocene)
    - †Ochotona tedfordi (China: Yushe Basin, late Miocene)
    - †Ochotona cf. whartoni (Irkutsk Oblast and Yakutia, Pleistocene, see also North America)
    - †Ochotona zabiensis (southern Poland, early Pleistocene)
    - †Ochotona sp. (Greece: Maritsa, Pliocene)
    - †Ochotona sp. (Hungary: Ostramos, Pleistocene)
    - †Ochotona sp. (Siberia, Pleistocene)
    - †Ochotona sp. (Yakutia, Pleistocene)
- North America
  - †Ochotona gromovi (US: Colorado, Pliocene, see also Eurasia)
  - †Ochotona spanglei (US, late Miocene or early Pliocene) (Note: Ochotona spanglei in the Paleobiology Database. (Note: Additional contributors to utilized records of Paleobiology Database (authorizers supplying these records) include John Alroy.))
  - †Ochotona tologoica (US: Colorado, Pliocene, see also Eurasia)
  - †Ochotona whartoni (giant pika, US, Canada, Pleistocene to early Holocene, see also Eurasia) (Note: Ochotona whartoni in the Paleobiology Database. (Note: Additional contributors to utilized records of Paleobiology Database (authorizers supplying these records) include John Alroy, Jonathan Marcot.))
  - †Ochotona wheatleyi (US: Alaska, Pliocene, late Pleistocene)
  - †Ochotona zazhigini (US: Colorado, Pleistocene, see also Eurasia)
  - extinct small pikas similar to the O. pusilla group (Pleistocene)

Paleontologists have also described multiple forms of pika not referred to specific species (Ochotona indet.) or not certainly identified (O. cf. antiqua, O. cf. cansus, O. cf. daurica, O. cf. eximia, O. cf. gromovi, O. cf. intermedia, O. cf. koslowi, O. cf. lagrelii, O. cf. nihewanica). The statuses of Ochotona (Proochotona) kirgisica and O. spelaeus are uncertain. The "pusilla" group of pikas is characterized by archaic (plesiomorphic) cheek teeth and small size. Pikas on the whole have been described as "one of the most complex and problematic groups in mammalian systematics".

The North American species migrated from Eurasia. They invaded the New World twice:

- O. spanglei during the latest Miocene or early Pliocene, followed by a roughly three-million-year-long gap in the known North American pika record
- O. whartoni (giant pika) and small pikas via the Bering Land Bridge during the earliest Pleistocene

Ochotona cf. whartoni and small pikas of the O. pusilla group are also known from Siberia. The extant, endemic North American species appeared in the Pleistocene. The North American collared pika (O. collaris) and American pika (O. princeps) have been suggested to have descended from the same ancestor as the steppe pika (O. pusilla).

The range of Ochotona was larger in the past, with both extinct and extant species inhabiting Western Europe and Eastern North America, areas that are currently free of pikas. Pleistocene fossils of the extant steppe pika O. pusilla currently native to Asia have been found also in many countries of Europe from the United Kingdom to Russia and from Italy to Poland, and the Asiatic extant northern pika O. hyperborea in one location in the middle Pleistocene United States.

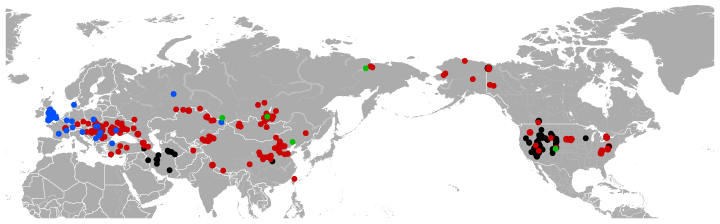
Pika Ochotona sp. fossil distribution. Extinct pikas and Ochotona indet. are red, steppe pika O. pusilla blue, northern pika O. hyperborea green, other extant pikas black. (Note: The coordinates of additional fossils not listed in the xls file attached to Ge and all paper were taken from the Paleobiology Database. (Note: Janossy, D. (1986). Pleistocene vertebrate faunas of Hungary. Vol. 8. Amsterdam: Elsevier. ISBN 978-0-444-99526-1.) (Note: Additional contributors to utilized records of Paleobiology Database (authorizers supplying these records) include John Alroy, Anna Behrensmeyer, Will Clyde, Alan Turner, Mark Uhen.))

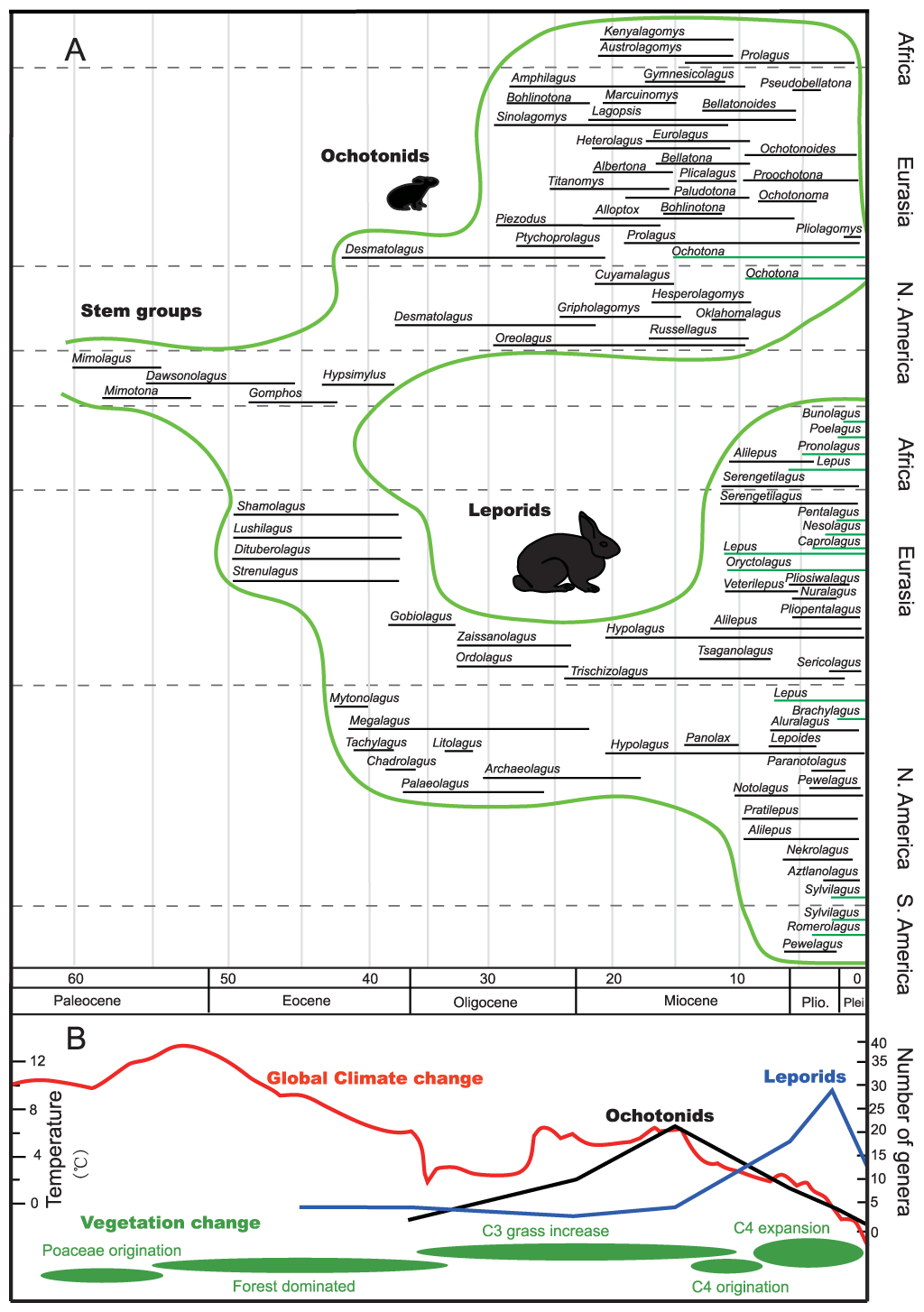
Fossil occurrences of leporids and ochotonids and global environmental change (climate change, C_{3}/C_{4} plants distribution)

While Ochotona is the only currently living genus of Ochotonidae, extinct genera of ochotonids include †Albertona, †Alloptox, †Amphilagus, †Australagomys, †Austrolagomys, †Bellatona, †Bellatonoides, †Bohlinotona, †Cuyamalagus, †Desmatolagus, †Eurolagus, †Gripholagomys, †Gymnesicolagus, †Hesperolagomys, †Heterolagus, †Kenyalagomys, †Lagopsis, †Marcuinomys, †Ochotonoides, †Ochotonoma, †Oklahomalagus, †Oreolagus, †Paludotona, †Piezodus, †Plicalagus, †Pliolagomys, †Prolagus, †Proochotona (syn. Ochotona), †Pseudobellatona, †Ptychoprolagus, †Russellagus, †Sinolagomys, †Titanomys and †Tonomochota. The earliest one is Desmatolagus (middle Eocene to Miocene, 42.5–14.8 Ma), usually included in the Ochotonidae, sometimes in Leporidae or in neither ochotonid nor leporid stem-lagomorphs.

Ochotonids appeared in Asia between the late Eocene and the early Oligocene, and continued to develop along with increased distribution of C_{3} grasses in previously forest dominated areas under the "climatic optimum" from the late Oligocene to middle Miocene. They thrived in Eurasia, North America, and even Africa. The peak of their diversity occurred during the period from the early Miocene to middle Miocene. Most of them became extinct during the transition from the Miocene to Pliocene, which was accompanied by an increase in diversity of the leporids. It has been proposed that this switch between ochotonids and larger leporids was caused by expansion of C_{4} plants (particularly the Poaceae) related to global cooling in the late Miocene, since extant pikas reveal a strong preference for C_{3} plants (Asteraceae, Rosaceae, and Fabaceae, many of them C_{3}). Replacement of large areas of forests by open grassland first started probably in North America and is called sometimes "nature's green revolution".
