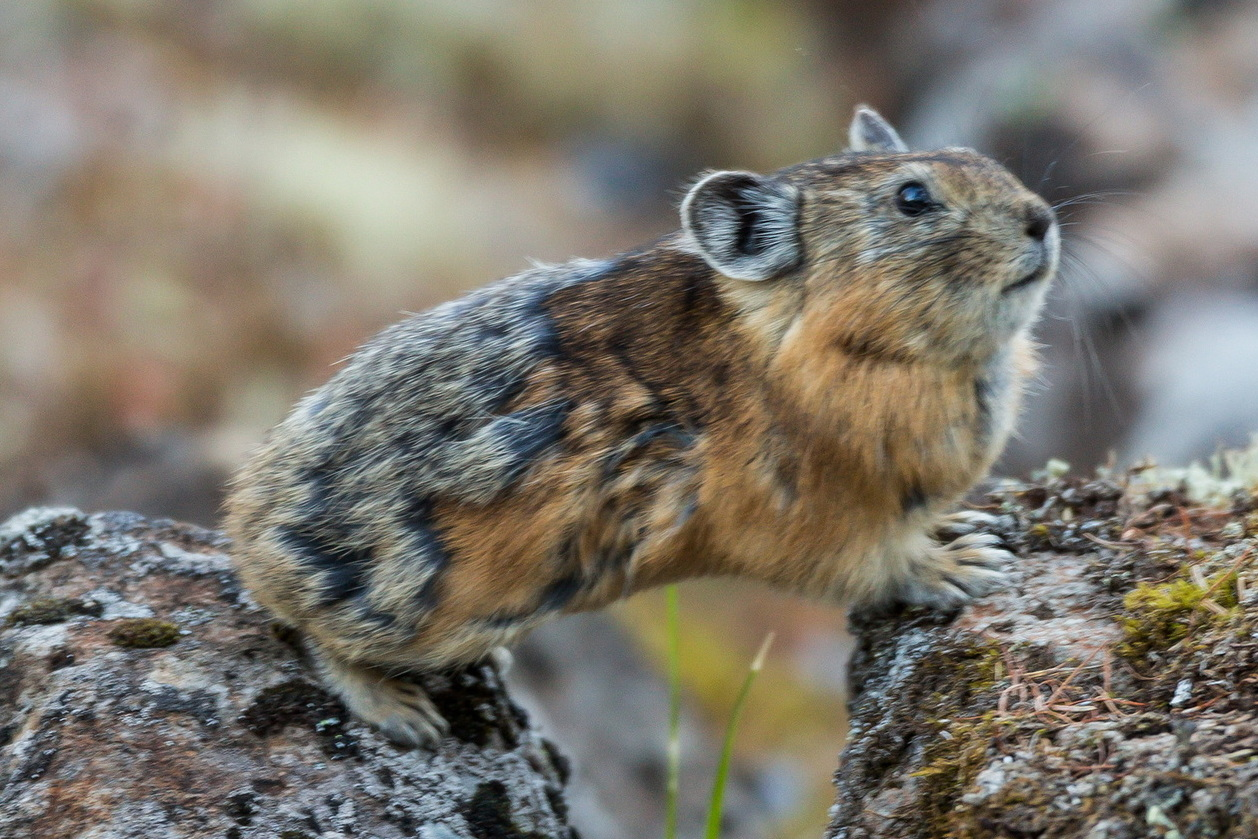
- Putorana Nature Reserve, Krasnoyarsk Krai, Russia

Conservation status
- Least Concern (IUCN 3.1)

Scientific classification
- Kingdom: Animalia
- Phylum: Chordata
- Class: Mammalia
- Order: Lagomorpha
- Family: Ochotonidae
- Genus: Ochotona
- Species: O. turuchanensis

Binomial name
- Ochotona turuchanensis Naumov, 1934
- Turuchan pika range

Synonyms
- Ochotona (Pika) hyperborea turuchanensis Naumov, 1933

= Turuchan pika =

Species of mammal

The Turuchan pika (Ochotona turuchanensis) (Russian: Туруханская пищуха, romanized: Turuhanskaya pischuha) is a species of pika found on the Central Siberian Plateau in Russia. It is a small, rock-dwelling pika measuring 15.8 to 22 centimeters (6.2 to 8.7 inches) long and weighing 113 to 171 grams (4.0 to 6.0 ounces). Its fur coat varies in color with the seasons, changing from mostly red in summer to gray in winter. The pika is active during the day and avoids both high and low temperatures. It also tends to stay out of strong winds. Like most pikas, the Turuchan pika uses alert calls to communicate. Adult pikas have been seen playing alone or socially with other adults.

Turuchan pikas have a varied diet of plants, and follow a habit of gathering food to store it for winter in haypiles that is common among pikas. Their diet varies with the season, but one of their most preferred plant species is the common nettle. Mating takes place from June to August. The species was previously thought to be a subspecies of the northern pika, which it is very similar to in appearance, though it is more closely related to the alpine pika. Because it is widespread throughout its range and reportedly abundant, the Turuchan pika is considered a least-concern species by the International Union for Conservation of Nature. It is a poorly researched species largely due to the remoteness of its habitat.

== Taxonomy and etymology ==
The Turuchan pika was first described in 1933 by the Russian zoologist Nikolay Pavlovich Naumov as Ochotona hyperborea turuchanensis, a subspecies of the northern pika (Ochotona hyperborea). This classification was unchanged until April 2003, when it was considered by authors Formozov and Yakhontov to be a more northerly subspecies of the alpine pika (Ochontona alpina). Because it was only differentiated based on aspects of its alarm call and fur colors, the authors did not consider it distinctive enough to warrant separation as a different species. Earlier, in March 2003, the Turuchan pika was described as a distinct species by Russian zoologist Andrey Lissovsky.

Mammalogists Robert S. Hoffmann and Andrew T. Smith wrote in 2005 that the Turuchan pika was a distinct species in the third edition of Mammal Species of the World, following Lissovsky. This distinction was supported by later phylogenetic studies of the pikas from Lissovsky and colleagues which showed that their closest relative is the alpine pika.

== Description ==
Adult Turuchan pikas have a head and body length ranging from 15.8 to 22 centimeters (6.2 to 8.7 inches), a weight of 113 to 171 grams (4.0 to 6.0 ounces), an ear length of 1.6 to 2.4 cm (0.63 to 0.94 in) and hind feet measuring 2.5 to 3 cm (0.98 to 1.18 in). The fur coat of the Turuchan pika varies with the seasons. In winter, the pika's graphite-gray undercoat is overlaid by yellow-brown and yellow-gray fur along its back. Chestnut-red spots are visible on the sides of its neck, and the ears have a light-colored fringe. In summer, the undercoat turns to an ochraceous red, which obscures the neck spots. The sides and underbody of the pika share the red color. Black-tipped hairs along the back and nape form a dark band along the pika's body in the summer coat. The winter coat is made of fur that is comparatively longer, softer, and lighter in color than the coat in other seasons.

The Turuchan pika is similar in appearance to the northern pika. Both species have nearly identical skull size and shape, though the Turuchan pika is generally of larger body size when the two species are compared. The skull of the Turuchan pika is distinguished from that of other pikas within its range by the presence of bony protrusions that cover the front edge of the palatine foramina, which are holes in the roof of the mouth (the palate). Compared to that of the alpine pika, the skull of the Turuchan pika is shorter and rounder.

== Distribution ==
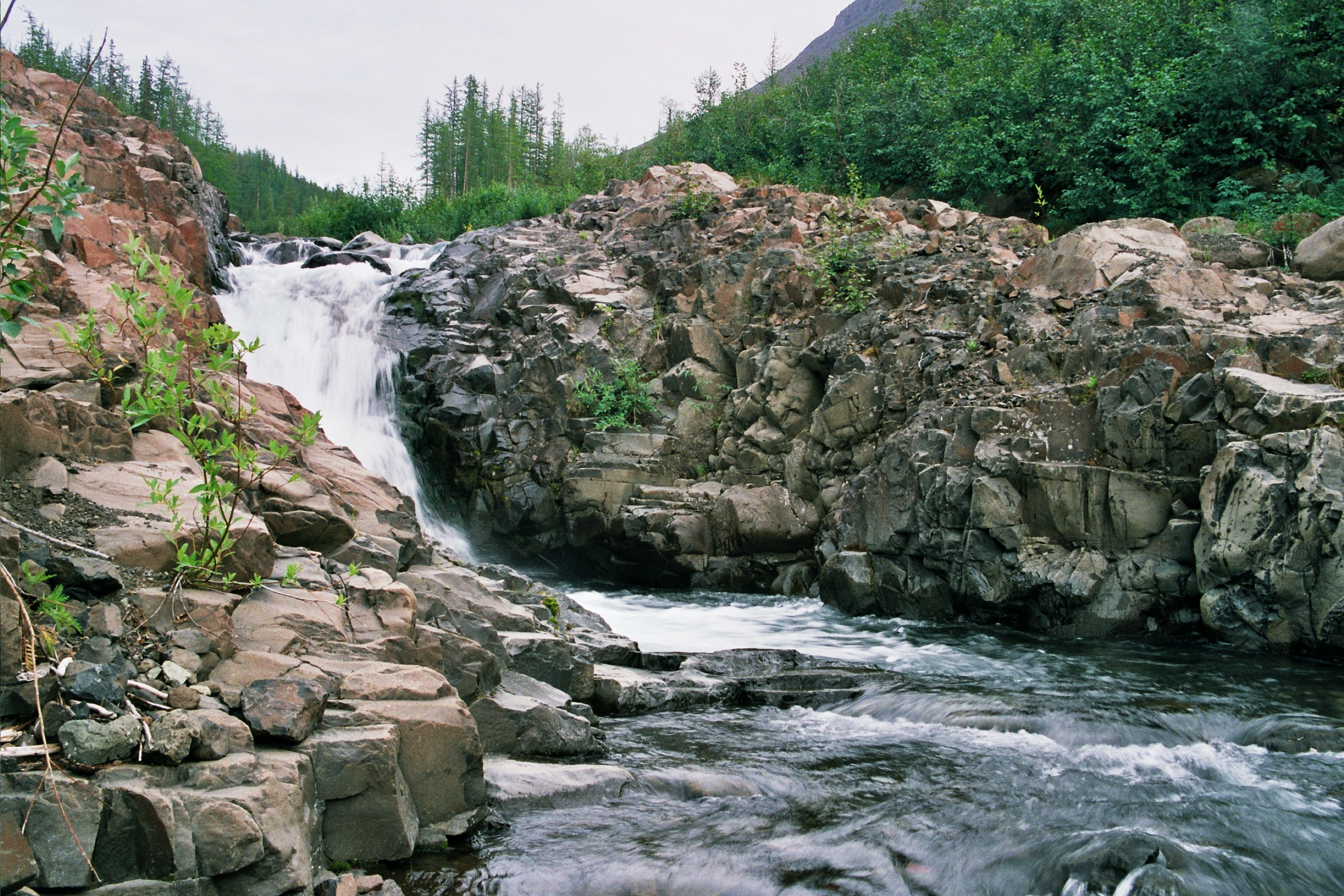
A stream in the Putorana Plateau, a region where the Turuchan pika may be found

The Turuchan pika is found in Russia on the Central Siberian Plateau. It occurs from the southern reaches of the Yenisei River to Lake Baikal to the middle region of the Lena River and its basin. It lives in sympatry with the northern pika, which has a much wider distribution throughout northeast Asia. On the Primorsky Mountain Ridge in the Irkutsk Region, 14 localities were surveyed for pika occurrence in June 2018 and July 2019. All areas were considered to be within the Northern pika's range of distribution. However, it was discovered through in-situ pika vocalizations that only the Turuchan pika was present there.

Turuchan pika habitats are largely characterized by availability of surface rocks. In taiga environments, they will live in piles of fallen logs, and in some regions will use stumps and heaped fallen roots for shelter. The pika seeks out rocky talus deposits or cavities between buried rocks for shelter, where it stores vegetation to last through the winter months. Hilltop spring sources are their most preferred shelters.

== Behavior and ecology ==
The Turuchan pika is diurnal, active during the day and sleeping at night. It is intolerant of heavy wind, which is unusual among pikas. It avoids both high and low temperatures, with the latter being a motivation for it avoiding nighttime activities. Turuchan pikas will make runways in mossy or vegetated areas to travel between shelters, and generally avoid attention. They will, however, use alert calls, as is typical of most pika species. The Turuchan pika has both a short call, which is likened to that of the northern pika with a higher frequency (in kilohertz), and a long call, which is similar to the alpine pika's. Adults are found to engage in play in the wild, both alone and socially. Turuchan pikas will spontaneously jump in the air and twist around, usually while carrying an object in its mouth, and will also chase, jump after, and hide from each other.

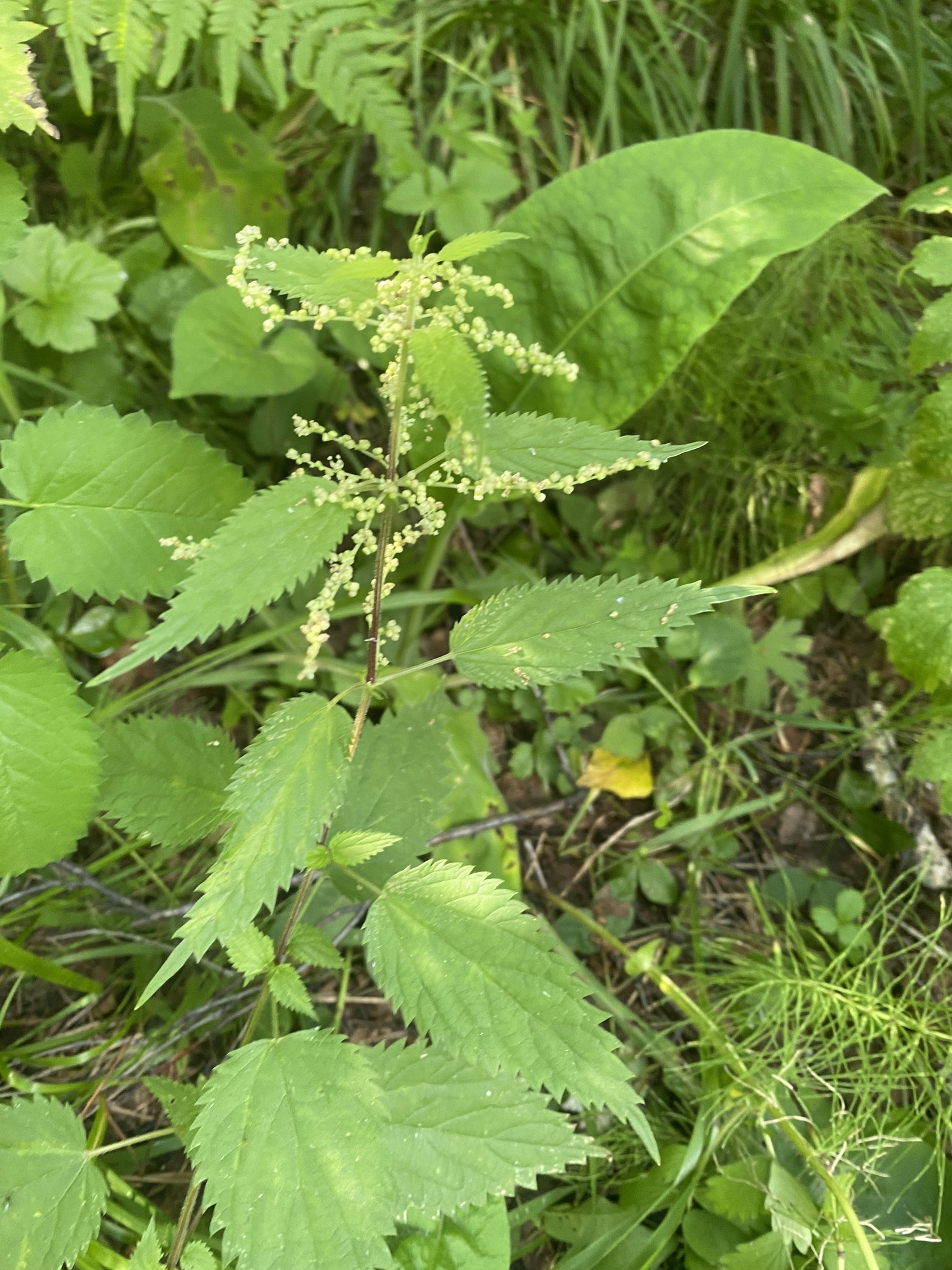
The common nettle (Urtica dioica), a preferred food source of the Turuchan pika, as seen in Irkutsk Oblast

Like other pikas, the Turuchan pika is herbivorous, and it gathers plant matter to store in the form of haypiles in shelters among talus deposits. Some common plants found throughout the pika's habitat on the Primorsky Ridge that are found in haypiles include Rubus matsumuranus, Sambucus sibirica, Populus tremula, and Spiraea media. Two plant species, Veratrum nigrum and Urtica dioica, are especially preferred by the Turuchan pika, despite their relative rarity. The pika's habit of selecting for Urtica dioica has led this plant species to become more widespread within Turuchan pika habitats as its nettles are spread throughout the talus slopes.

Turuchan pikas will often select plants that contain compounds that are toxic to mammals when creating haypiles; this behavior is thought to help in preserving other plants in the haypile, as toxins will degrade over time in storage while the nutritional content of the plant remains the same. The Turuchan pika will occasionally eat mushrooms as well. When not preparing for the winter, it grazes on fresh plants rather than storing them in a cache. Some plants more commonly eaten in summer months include Galium verum, Thalictrum appendiculatum, and Veronica incana.

One litter of young is produced by the Turuchan pika annually, with an average of 3.4 young per litter. The mating season takes place from mid-June to late August. The pika's predators include stoats, rough-legged buzzards, and northern hawk-owls.

== Conservation status ==
The International Union for Conservation of Nature considers the Turuchan pika to be a least-concern species. Though it is widespread and reportedly abundant throughout the Putorana Plateau, it has not been widely investigated. The pika is known to reside within the remote protected areas of Putorana Nature Reserve and the Central Siberia Nature Reserve. There are no conservation measures enacted to protect the species.
