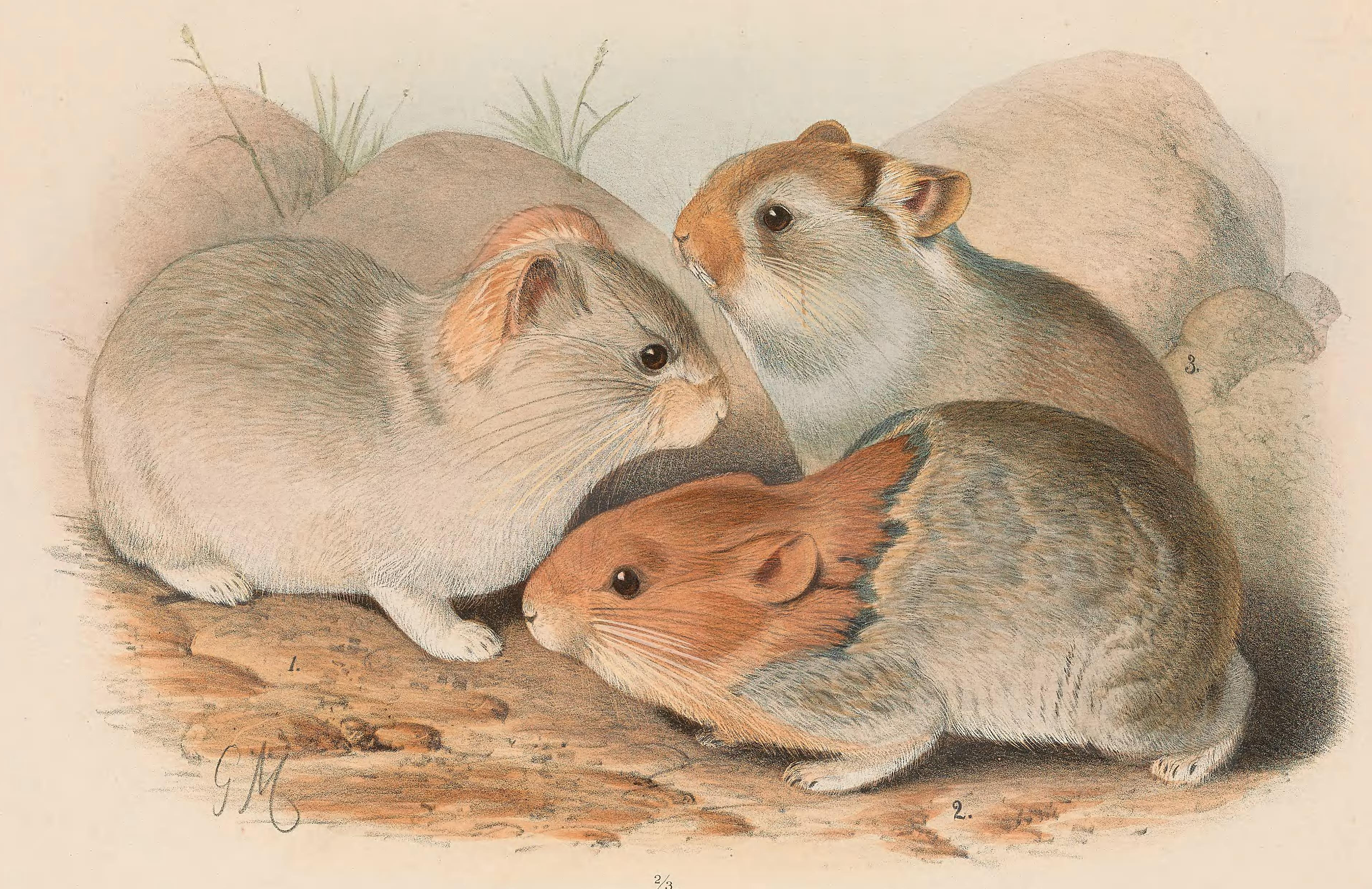

Conservation status
- Least Concern (IUCN 3.1)

Scientific classification
- Kingdom: Animalia
- Phylum: Chordata
- Class: Mammalia
- Order: Lagomorpha
- Family: Ochotonidae
- Genus: Ochotona
- Species: O. erythrotis

Binomial name
- Ochotona erythrotis (Büchner, 1890)
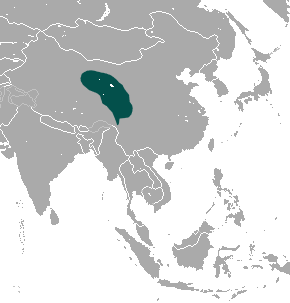
- Chinese red pika range

= Chinese red pika =

Species of mammal

The Chinese red pika (Ochotona erythrotis) is a species of mammal in the family Ochotonidae. Typical of a pika it has short limbs, a small tail and round ears. Specific to the Chinese red pika has distinctive red color in its pelt. The Chinese pika typically lives in rocky terrain at altitudes between 600 and 1200 meters and is endemic to the East Qinghai, West Gansu and Northern Sichuan provinces of China and Eastern Tibet.

== Description ==
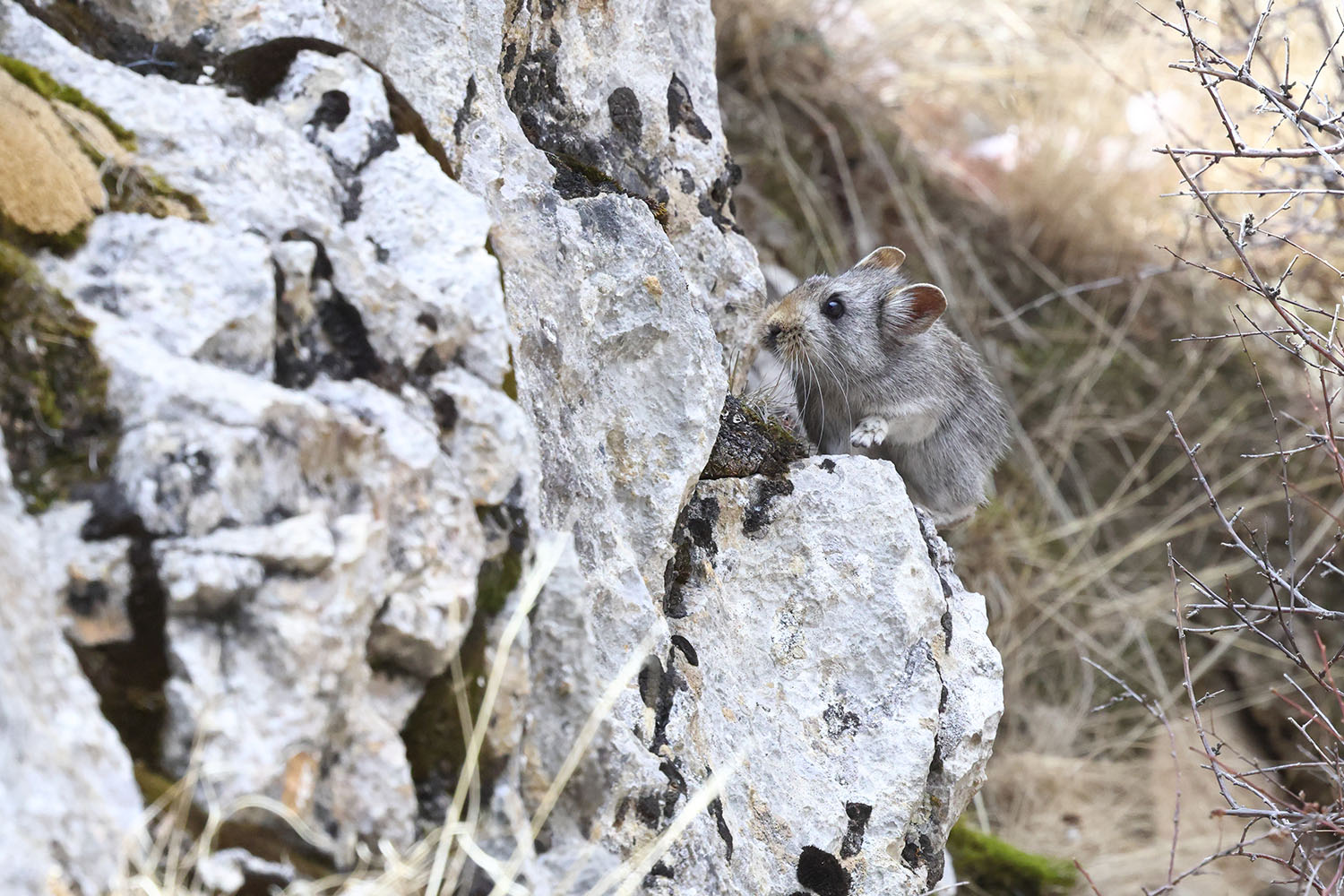
Chinese red pika (Ochotona erythrotis), Qinghai, China

The Chinese red pika is one of the largest pika species, averaging a length of 18 to 29 cm. This pika has both a winter and summer pelt.

The winter pelt is thicker for the cooler weather, and is a grey color with a slight tint of red in the ear region.

In the summer, this species has a coat that is a rusty-red color at the head and chest and progressively becomes more grey at the tail end of the animal. The stomach region of O. erythrotis is a white color in both pelts.

== Speciation ==
The Chinese red pika was formerly regarded as a subgenus of Pika, included first with Ochotona gloveri and later with Ochotona rutila until they were determined to be separate species (mammal species). The pika species O. gloveri is believed to be the closest relative to O. erythrotis. The two species are considered to have an allopatric relationship. Differences between O. erythrotis, O. gloveri, and O. rutila are primarily seen in the shape of the skull and in fur color. The Chinese Red Pika has larger auditory bullae, a shorter nasals cavity, and a broader rostrum than O. gloveri. It has a smaller, and more arched skull than O. rutila and additionally has frontal fenestrae. Additionally, these subspecies have different fur colorations. O. gloveri has darker fur than O. erythrotis. Its summer fur is darker with more of a brown tint with a distinct rusty red color on the nose, forehead and ear region. In the winter, its coat is much lighter than O. erythrotis.

== Reproduction ==
O. erythrotis have an average of two litters per year, usually averaging 3–7 young per litter. Their reproductive season is between May and August.

== Geography ==
O. erythrotis is found in China and East Tibet. Specifically in China, O. erythrotis can be found in East Qinghai, West Gansu and Northern Sichuan.

== Habitat ==
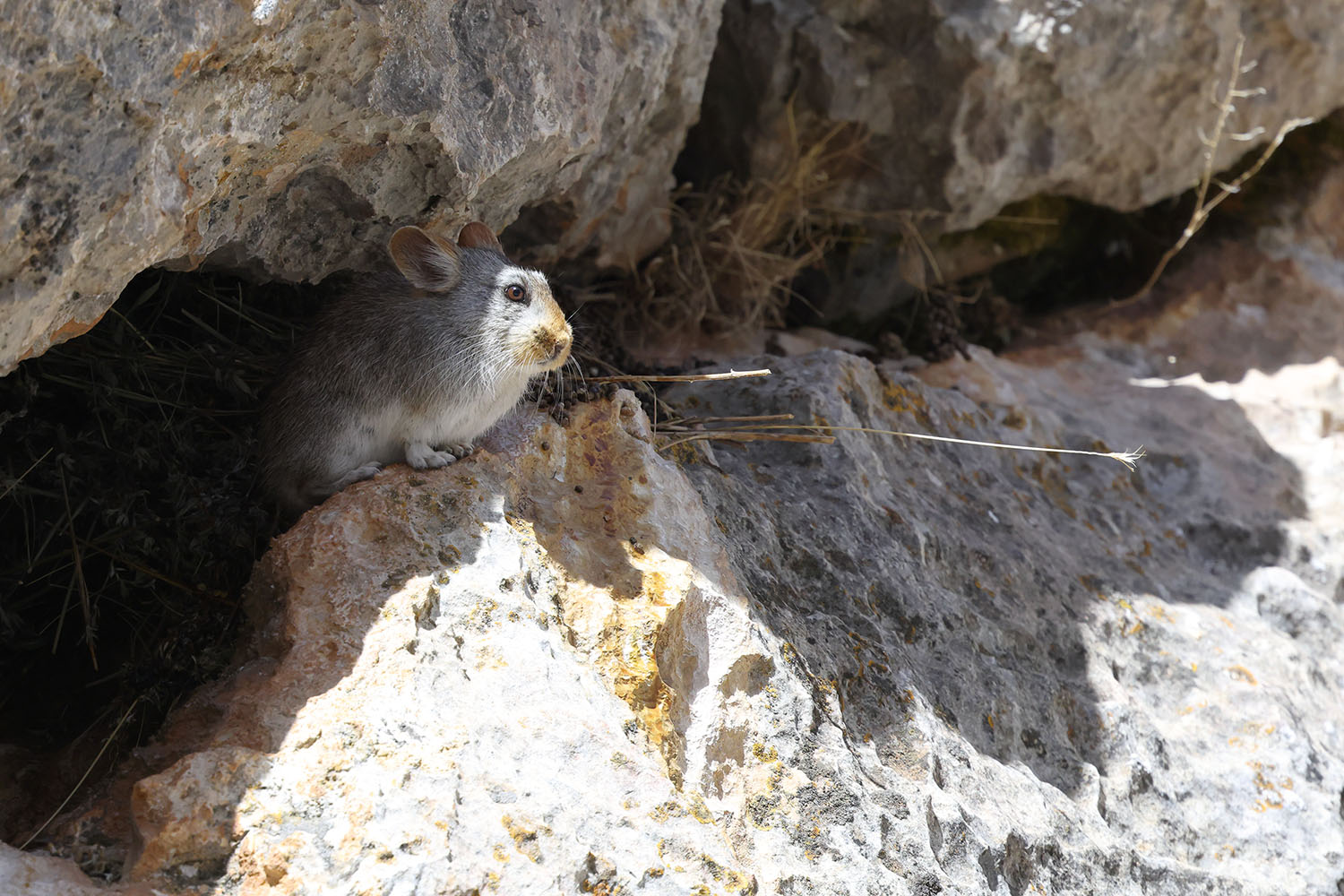
Chinese red pika (Ochotona erythrotis), Qinghai, China

The Chinese red pika is primarily a rock-dwelling pika. It can be found in cliff and rock terrain or in the alpine shrubland and meadows near rock formations primarily at an altitude of 600–1,200 metres (2,000–3,900 ft).

This species has been observed to be adaptable and opportunistic in where it lives. This pika species is a burrowing species, which makes burrows that are 1–2 meters in length. Unlike many small high-altitude mammals, the Chinese red pika does not hibernate but relies on a key behavioral adaptation: haypiling.

In late summer and autumn, pika actively harvest herbaceous plants (focusing on those that offer the highest nutritional value and the best preservation quality) and turn them into large haystacks, usually located under rock crevices or boulders, serving as their important winter food storage sites.
