= Glover's pika =

Conservation status
- Least Concern (IUCN 3.1)

Scientific classification
- Kingdom: Animalia
- Phylum: Chordata
- Class: Mammalia
- Order: Lagomorpha
- Family: Ochotonidae
- Genus: Ochotona
- Species: O. gloveri

Binomial name
- Ochotona gloveri Thomas, 1922

Subspecies
- O. g. brookei Allen, 1937; O. g. calloceps Pen et al., 1962; O. g. gloveri Thomas, 1922; O. g. muliensis Pen and Feng, 1962
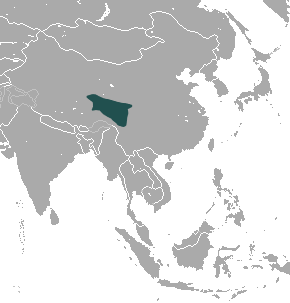
- Glover's pika range

Synonyms
- O. g. kamensis Argyropulo, 1948

Species of mammal

Glover's pika (Ochotona gloveri) is a species of mammal in the family Ochotonidae. It was first described in 1922, by Michael Rogers Oldfield Thomas. The summer dorsal pelage is grayish rufous, grayish brown, or tea brown in colour. The winter pelage is similar to the summer pelage, but is lighter in tone. Endemic to China, it is found in high altitudes of northeastern Tibet, southwestern Qinghai, western Sichuan, and northwestern Yunnan. It is a generalist herbivore, and is known to construct haypiles. It is rated as a species of least concern by the International Union for Conservation of Nature. It is also regionally red listed as least concern in China.

== Taxonomy ==
Glover's pika was first described in 1922 by the British zoologist Michael Rogers Oldfield Thomas, in the Annals and Magazine of Natural History. It belongs to the subgenus Conothoa. There are four recognized subspecies:

- O. g. brookei Allen, 1937
- O. g. calloceps Pen et al., 1962
- O. g. gloveri Thomas, 1922
- O. g. muliensis Pen and Feng, 1962

Its taxonomic placement has been controversial and subject to change. In 1951, Ellerman and Terence Morrison-Scott assigned O. g. brookei as a subspecies of the Turkestan red pika (Ochotona rutila), but it is now treated as a subspecies of Glover's pika. Pen et al., in 1962, described the Muli pika (Ochotona muliensis) as a new form of the Glover's pika; the Muli pika was afterwards considered an independent species based on skull morphology, but it is currently considered a subspecies of the Glover's pika. The Glover's pika was earlier treated as a subspecies of the Turkestan red pika, but it is now considered as an independent species based on the skull morphology, pelage color, and zoogeography. It had also been treated as a subspecies of the Chinese red pika (Ochotona erythrotis) partly because of its assignment under the Turkestan red pika. According to morphological and molecular studies, the Glover's pika is closely related to the Chinese red pika and the two are sister groups. In 1948, Argyropulo described the species Ochotona kamensis, and explained it to be the larger and more differentiated than the Chinese red pika and the Glover's pika. In 1985, after observing striking similarities between their skull structures and coat colors, Feng and Zheng synonymized Ochotona kamensis with Ochotona gloveri. In 1988, however, Erbajeva synonymized Ochotona kamensis with Ochotona gloveri brookei, and retained the name kamensis, as she did not use the principle of priority which recognizes the first valid application of a name to a plant or animal.

== Description ==
The Glover's pika measures 16 to 22 cm (6.3 to 8.7 in) in length, and weighs 140 to 300 g (4.9 to 10.6 oz). It has a 4.3 to 5.3 cm (1.7 to 2.1 in) long skull with its dorsal side being arch shaped due to the oblique backward sloping of the parietal bone. The frontal bone protrudes forward slightly, and has two oval alveoli above it. The summer dorsal pelage is grayish rufous, grayish brown, or tea brown in colour. The head is orange or pale brown from the rostrum to the frontal bone. The ears are large, measuring 3.1 to 3.9 cm (1.2 to 1.5 in) in length, are thin haired, and light chestnut, orange, or orange brown colored. The winter pelage is similar to the summer pelage, but is lighter in tone. The ventral and upper portion of the feet are dull gray or grayish white. The hindfeet are 3.1 to 3.6 cm (1.2 to 1.4 in) long. The anterior palatal foramen and the palatal foramen are detached or adjoined.

The nominate subspecies O. g. gloveri has a dark gray cheek and smoky yellow rostrum. O. g. brookei has an orange russet tipped nose, and light gray spotted above the eyes. The Glover's pika is similar to the Chinese red pika, but it is distinguished by its smaller auditory bullae, more slender rostrum, and longer nasals than the Chinese red pika. It also does not have the reddish mantle as possessed by the Chinese red pika.

== Distribution and habitat ==
The Glover's pika species is endemic to China. It is found in high altitudes of northeastern Tibet, southwestern Qinghai, western Sichuan, and northwestern Yunnan. The nominate subspecies O. g. gloveri is found in western Sichuan, O. g. brookei is found in southwestern Qinghai and northeastern Tibet, and O. g. calloceps is found in northwestern Yunnan and eastern Tibet.

It is a rock-dwelling pika which usually inhabits scree deposits and rocky clefts which is bordered by woodlands in most of its range. It is also known to live in adobe walls of lamaseries and villages, and does not live in grazing or agricultural habitats. It is typically found in high elevations ranging from 3,500 to 4,200 m (11,500 to 13,800 ft) from sea level but, in Sichuan, it may occur at lower altitudes of 1,700 metres (5,600 ft).

== Behavior and ecology ==
Very little is known about the Glover's pika's behavior, ecology, and reproduction. It is a generalist herbivore, and is known to construct haypiles.

== Status and conservation ==
Since 1996, the Glover's pika is rated as a species of least concern on the IUCN Red List of Endangered Species. This is because it is a widespread species, and it occurs in remote areas of China which are unlikely to be affected by human activities. The current state of its population trend is unclear, as no natural historic or ecological investigation has been done on this species. However, being locally poisoned and trapped is a major threat to the Glover's pika populations. It is also regionally red listed as a species of least concern in China.
