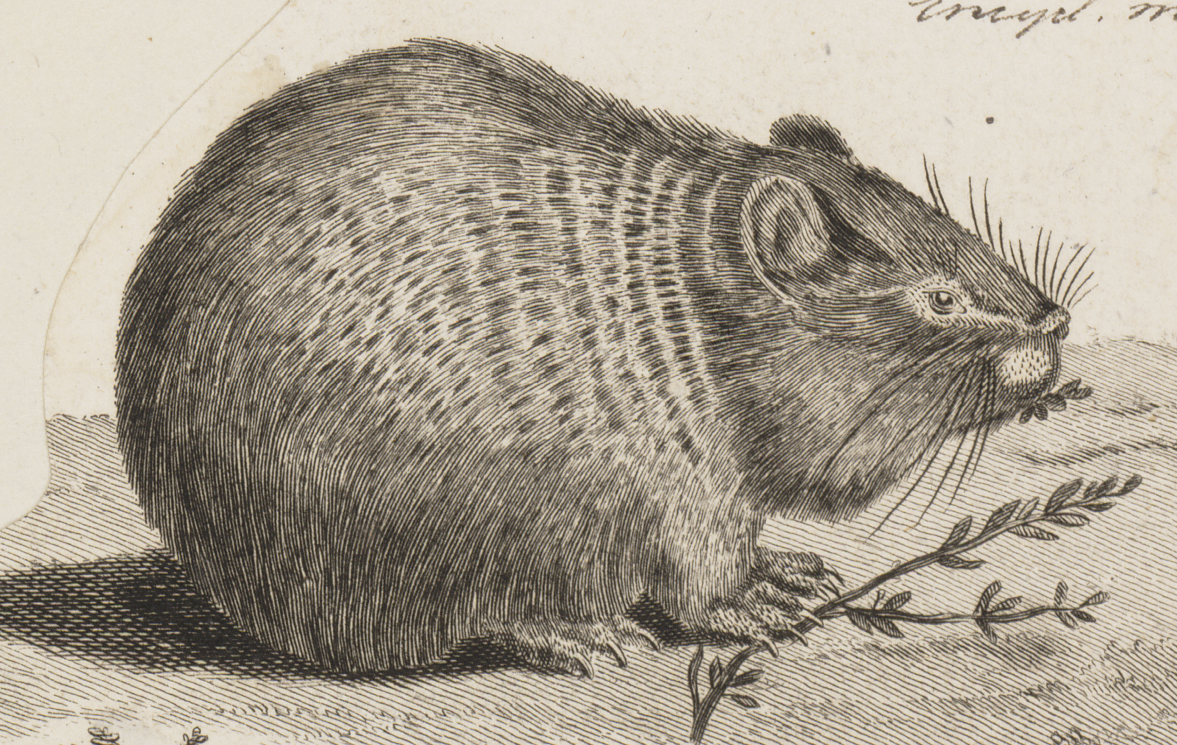

Conservation status
- Least Concern (IUCN 3.1)

Scientific classification
- Kingdom: Animalia
- Phylum: Chordata
- Class: Mammalia
- Order: Lagomorpha
- Family: Ochotonidae
- Genus: Ochotona
- Species: O. pusilla

Binomial name
- Ochotona pusilla (Pallas, 1769)

Subspecies
- O. pusilla angustifrons (Argyropulo, 1932); O. pusilla pusilla (Pallas, 1769)
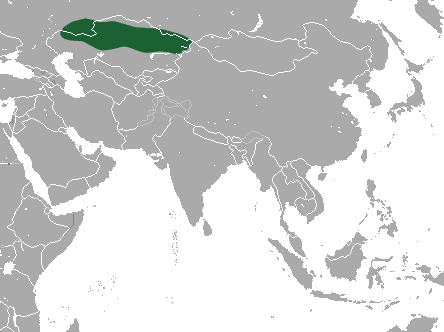
- Steppe pika range

= Steppe pika =

Species of mammal

The steppe pika (Ochotona pusilla) is a small mammal of the pika family, Ochotonidae. It is found in the steppes of southern Russia and northern Kazakhstan.

== General description ==
Ochotonidae includes only one genus - Ochotona, formed by 30 living species. Like rodents, pikas have chisel-like incisor teeth, but they also have a second pair of incisors in the upper jaw, followed by two molar teeth in the upper jaw and three molar teeth in the lower jaw. Pikas have no canines. Their teeth grow throughout their life and they need to be worn down. The anatomical structure of the lower jaw bone makes it possible to move the jaw both up and down and sideways. Pikas have sharp senses, they can smell, hear and see very well. Their fibular bone has partially accreted with the tibia. They have five digits on their limbs and pads on feet and toes. Pikas are not hibernating animals.

The steppe pika is usually 14.5–18.5 cm (5.7–7.3 in) long. The tail is reduced, and the short round ears have a lighter lining. The fur is taupe, with lighter hair ends. The coat becomes lighter in winter. Pikas give birth to up to 13 young in a litter, three to five times a year. The size of the litter may depend on the size of population in the area. One of the most distinctive characteristics of the steppe pika is its short, high-pitched alarm call, which gives the animal the name of the "whistling hare".

The steppe pika has been called a relict of Late Pliocene faunas on the basis of its fossil record, molar structure, karyological traits, and mtDNA sequence data.

== Distribution ==
Steppe pikas can be found in Central Asia, east of the Urals throughout southern Russia and northern Kazakhstan. During the Pleistocene its range was larger and included most of Europe. It survived in the Carpathian basin until the end of the Chalcolithic, in the middle Urals until the Middle Holocene, and in the southern Urals until the Late Holocene.

== Ecology ==
Steppe pika inhabits steppes covered by high grasses and bushes, where it finds shelter from its natural enemies, such as: foxes, corsacs, Turkestan polecats, ermine and other predators. Another of its niches is foothill of river valleys. Unlike other species of the family of pikas, Ochotona pusilla is a nocturnal creature. It is normally heard but not seen. The males emit a long series of low trills and the females do also sing to attract males and respond to other females. It lives in a flock, dwelling systems of underground passages with several openings. Pikas feed on soft parts of juicy plants and low shrubs, near its dens. One of its favorite plants is wormwood. Due to the fact it doesn't hibernate during winter, early (from June) it begins to gather grass, and dry it formed in haystacks. In the late autumn it moves the haystacks to the main chamber of its den.

The steppe pika inhabits only flatlands. Its fossil record in mountain areas is always linked to owl pellets and not indicative of the pika's past habits. Pikas are generally regarded as an excellent indicator of the health of steppe ecosystems, as they strictly avoid human disturbance.

== Population and environmental concerns ==
A decrease has been noted in the population of pikas, caused by climate changes and expanding agriculture. The pika has been included in the list of potentially endangered species but is classified as "least concern". One of the places where it is protected is Orenburgsky Zapovednik. A growing pika population may have a local impact on vegetation through feeding.
