= HMS Good Hope =

Four ships of the British Royal Navy have been named HMS Good Hope.

- The first HMS Good Hope (1664), of 35 guns, was captured by the French in May 1665.
- The second HMS Good Hope (1665), of 6 guns, was a flyboat captured from the Dutch in 1665 and sold in 1667.
- The third HMS Good Hope (1901) was a Drake-class armoured cruiser launched in 1901 and sunk in 1914 at the Battle of Coronel.
- The fourth HMS Good Hope was a "stone ship", or land-based naval officer training base, located at Sea View, a few kilometers outside of Port Elizabeth, South Africa. It was situated in a newly built luxury hotel (The Seaview Hotel) and had a golf course, a tidal swimming pool and a tennis court. It was started in 1942 by the Royal Navy and was the only facility outside of the UK where men from all over the British Commonwealth could be trained for a commission in the Royal Naval Volunteer Reserve. It was closed down in 1944.

There was also a South African Loch-class frigate SAS Good Hope, which was laid down as HMS Loch Boisdale in 1943 but renamed and transferred to the South African Navy before completion in 1944.
