= Good Hope, Mississippi =

Good Hope, Mississippi may refer to the following places in the U.S. state of Mississippi:

- Good Hope, Holmes County, Mississippi, an unincorporated community
- Good Hope, Leake County, Mississippi, an unincorporated community
- Good Hope, Marion County, Mississippi, an unincorporated community
- Good Hope, Neshoba County, Mississippi, an unincorporated community
- Good Hope, Perry County, Mississippi, an unincorporated community
