= Good Hope, U.S. Virgin Islands =

Coordinates: 17°41′37″N 64°50′55″W

Good Hope, United States Virgin Islands
- Village
- Interactive map of Good Hope, United States Virgin Islands
- Country: United States Virgin Islands
- Island: Saint Croix
- Time zone: UTC-4 (AST)

Good Hope is a settlement on the island of Saint Croix in the United States Virgin Islands.
