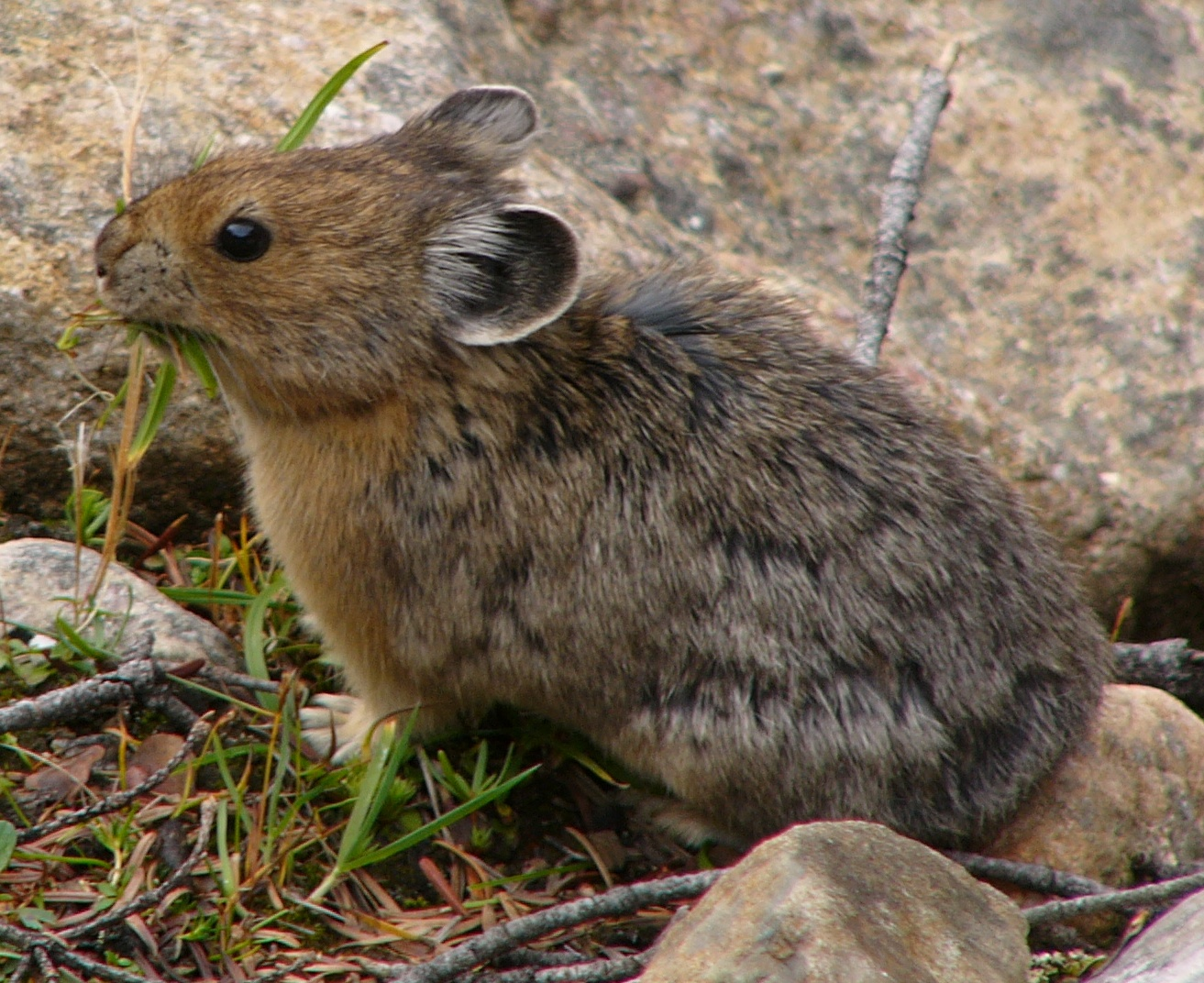
- An American pika collecting grass in the Canadian Rocky Mountains

Conservation status
- Least Concern (IUCN 3.1)

- Secure (NatureServe)

Scientific classification
- Kingdom: Animalia
- Phylum: Chordata
- Class: Mammalia
- Order: Lagomorpha
- Family: Ochotonidae
- Genus: Ochotona
- Species: O. princeps

Binomial name
- Ochotona princeps (Richardson, 1828)

Subspecies
- O. p. princeps; O. p. fenisex; O. p. saxatilis; O. p. schisticeps; O. p. uinta
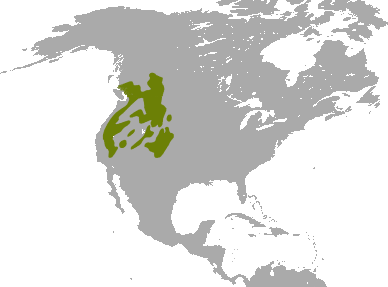
- American pika range

= American pika =

American pika Temporal range: Middle Pleistocene - Holocene, 1.8–0 Ma

Species of mammal

The American pika (Ochotona princeps) is a small, herbivorous mammal of the family Ochotonidae, closely related to rabbits and hares (order Lagomorpha). It is native to the mountainous regions of western North America, typically inhabiting rocky slopes and talus fields at or above the tree line. Unlike most mammals of similar size, the American pika is diurnal, being active primarily during the day. It employs two distinct foraging strategies: directly consuming vegetation or gathering and storing plant materials in "haypiles" to sustain itself through the winter months, a behavior known as haying.

Pikas are vocal animals, using a variety of calls and songs both to warn of approaching predators and during the breeding season. Predators of the American pika include eagles, hawks, coyotes, bobcats, foxes, and weasels.

Recent studies suggest that populations in the southwestern United States are declining due to habitat loss and global warming. Despite these regional declines, the American pika is overall assessed as a species of Least Concern by the IUCN and remains common in the northwestern United States and Canada.

== Taxonomy ==
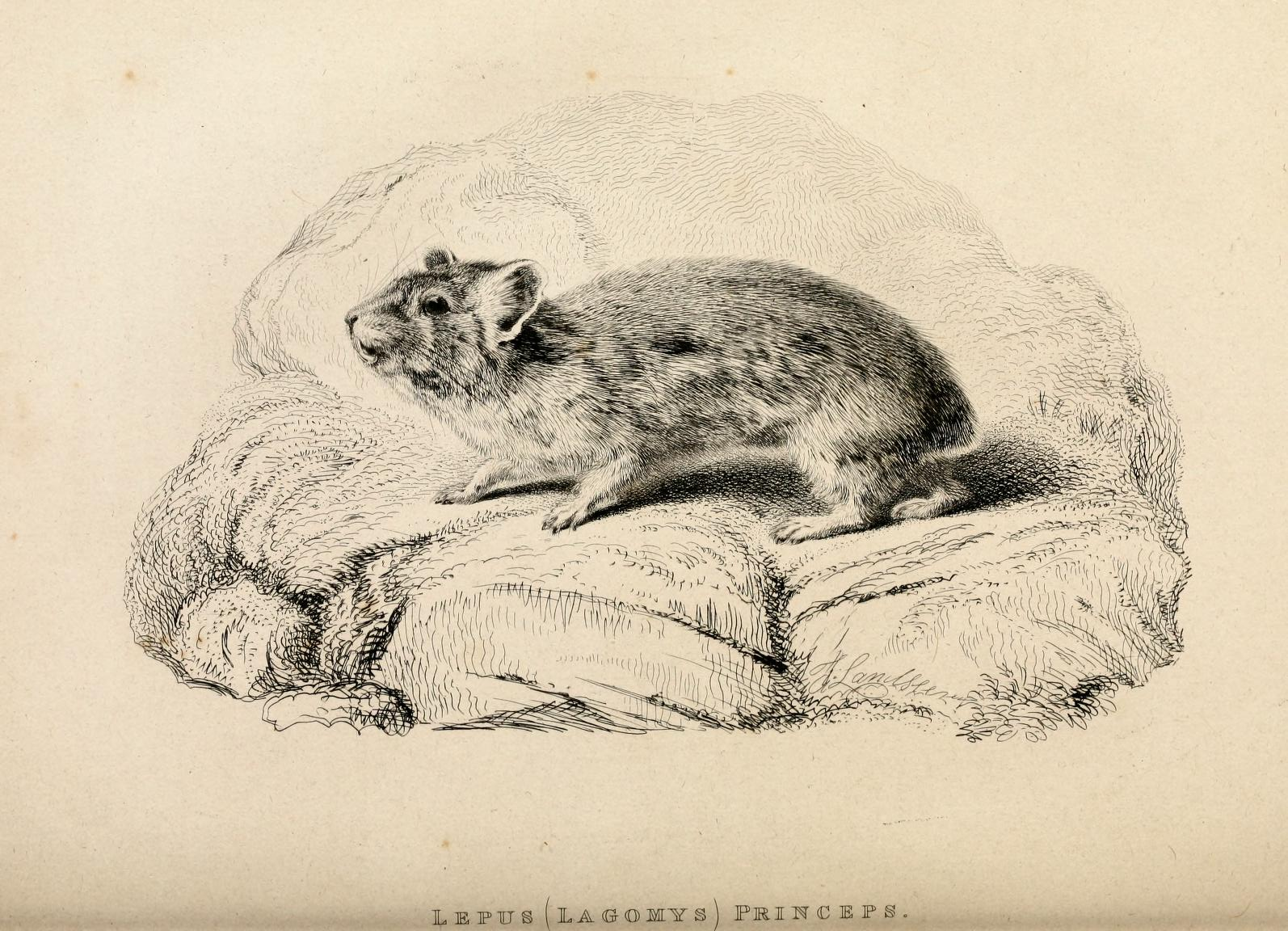
Lepus (Lagomys) princeps illustration from Richardson's original description in Fauna Boreali-Americana

The American pika was first described scientifically by the Scottish naturalist John Richardson in 1828, in his comprehensive work Fauna Boreali-Americana, which cataloged the animal species of northern North America. Richardson initially classified the species within the genus Lepus, primarily containing hares and rabbits, under the name Lepus (Lagomys) princeps. The use of the subgenus Lagomys reflected an early attempt to distinguish these small mammals from true rabbits and hares, though this classification predated the formal recognition of pikas as a separate genus.

Subsequent taxonomic revisions placed the American pika in the genus Ochotona, which is now recognized as the sole genus comprising all pikas. This genus is distinct within the family Ochotonidae, which itself is part of the order Lagomorpha, alongside rabbits and hares. The genus name Ochotona is derived from the Mongolian word for pika, reflecting the species' native range across North America and parts of Asia.

Over time, several subspecies of the American pika have been identified, primarily based on geographic distribution and minor morphological differences. However, taxonomic opinions on these subspecies vary, and ongoing genetic studies continue to refine the understanding of intraspecific variation within Ochotona princeps.

== Distribution and habitat ==
The American pika is found throughout the mountainous regions of western North America, ranging from central British Columbia and Alberta in Canada to the U.S. states of Oregon, Washington, Idaho, Montana, Wyoming, Colorado, Utah, Nevada, California, and New Mexico. Of the approximately 30 existing species of pika, it is one of only two native to North America, the other being the collared pika (O. collaris). The collared pika occurs farther north, and its distribution is separated from that of the American pika by a gap of about 800 km (500 mi) across British Columbia and Alberta.

American pikas primarily inhabit scree and talus fields, often surrounded by alpine vegetation, and are also found in piles of broken rock. They occasionally occupy man-made substrates such as mine tailings or piles of scrap lumber. Pikas typically establish dens and nests below rock surfaces, usually within spaces 20–100 centimetres (8–39 in) in diameter, but they often perch on larger, more prominent rocks. They are commonly found near or above the tree line in cool, moist microhabitats such as high peaks or along watercourses.

The species is highly sensitive to heat stress and is intolerant of high diurnal temperatures. In the northern parts of their distribution, the species occurs from near sea level up to around 3,000 m (9,800 ft), In the northern parts of its range, the American pika can occur near sea level. While in southern regions such as California and New Mexico, it is rarely found below 2,500 m (8,200 ft). Although pikas do not dig extensive burrows, they may enlarge existing crevices in the talus to create shelter.

== Description ==
At Banff National Park, Canada

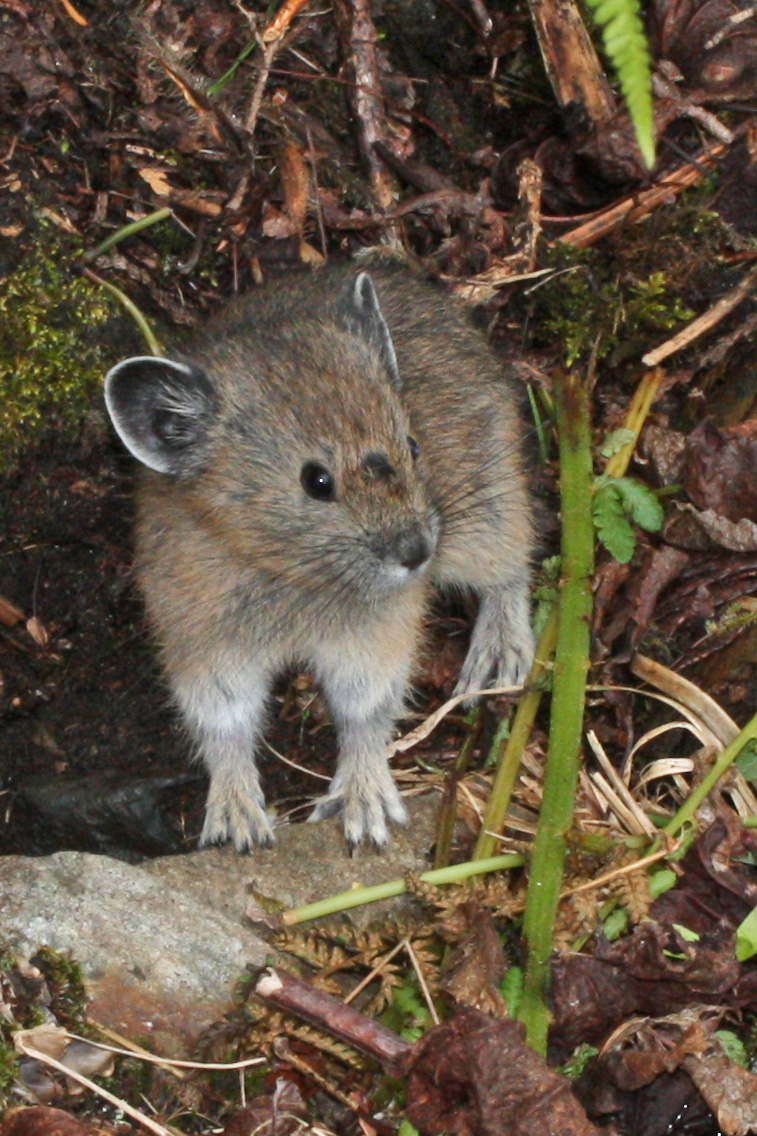
At 603 m (1,978 ft) above sea level in Mount Baker-Snoqualmie National Forest

American pikas, historically known as "little chief hares", are small, rounded mammals with a compact, ovate body adapted for life in cold alpine environments. Adults typically measure 16.2 to 21.6 cm (6.4 to 8.5 in) in length, with hind feet ranging from 2.5 to 3.5 cm (0.98 to 1.38 in). They usually weigh between 121 and 176 g (4.3–6.2 oz), though body size varies among populations and regions. In some areas, males are slightly larger than females. In populations exhibiting sexual dimorphism, males tend to be slightly larger than females.

The American pika is intermediate in size among pika species. Its notable features are suborbicular ears, densely furred feet with black pads at the toes, and a dense undercoat that provides insulation during winter months. The species is well adapted to high-elevation habitats. Its dense fur provides insulation against cold temperatures, covering the entire body, including the soles of the feet, except for small black pads at the toes. Its hind legs are only slightly longer than its forelegs, giving the animal a low and even stance typical of pikas, and its hind feet are relatively short compared to most other lagomorphs. The soles of the feet are densely furred, except for black pads at the ends of the toes. The ears are moderately large, rounded, and hairy on both surfaces, typically dark with white margins. The species has a relatively longer "buried" tail compared to most other lagomorphs, meaning that the tail is so short and densely covered with fur that it appears hidden within the animal's body fur rather than projecting outward. This adaptation is thought to provide extra insulation and protection from cold alpine winds.

The skull of the American pika is slightly rounded, with a broad and flat preorbital region that distinguishes it from related species. The cranium is relatively compact and adapted to support a strong bite force, useful for cutting and processing fibrous alpine vegetation. The zygomatic arches are well developed to anchor large masseter muscles. The maxillae contain a single large fenestration rather than the numerous small openings typical of rabbits and hares, a structural difference that lightens the skull while maintaining strength for chewing coarse plant material.

Fur coloration is the same in both sexes but varies by subspecies and season. The dorsal fur ranges from grayish to cinnamon-brown, often with tawny or ochraceous tones in summer. In winter, the fur becomes grayer and longer, while the dense underfur is slate-gray or lead-colored, and the ventral fur is whitish. Males are referred to as "bucks" and females as "does," as with rabbits.

== Diet ==
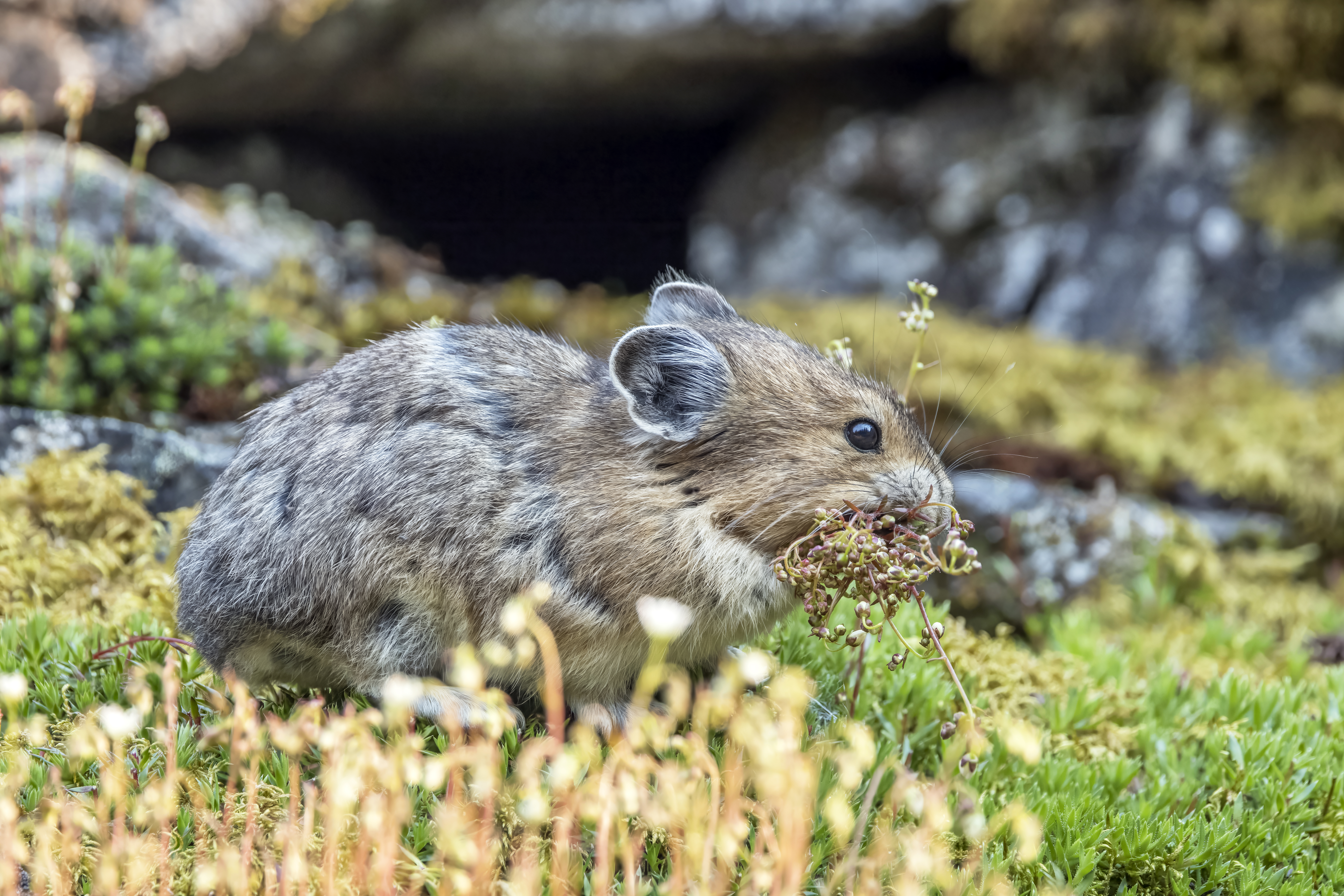
Haying spotted saxifrage, at Banff National Park, Canada

The American pika is a generalist herbivore, consuming a wide range of green vegetation, including various grasses, sedges, thistles, and fireweed. Although pikas can meet their water requirements through moisture in plants, they will drink water when it is available.

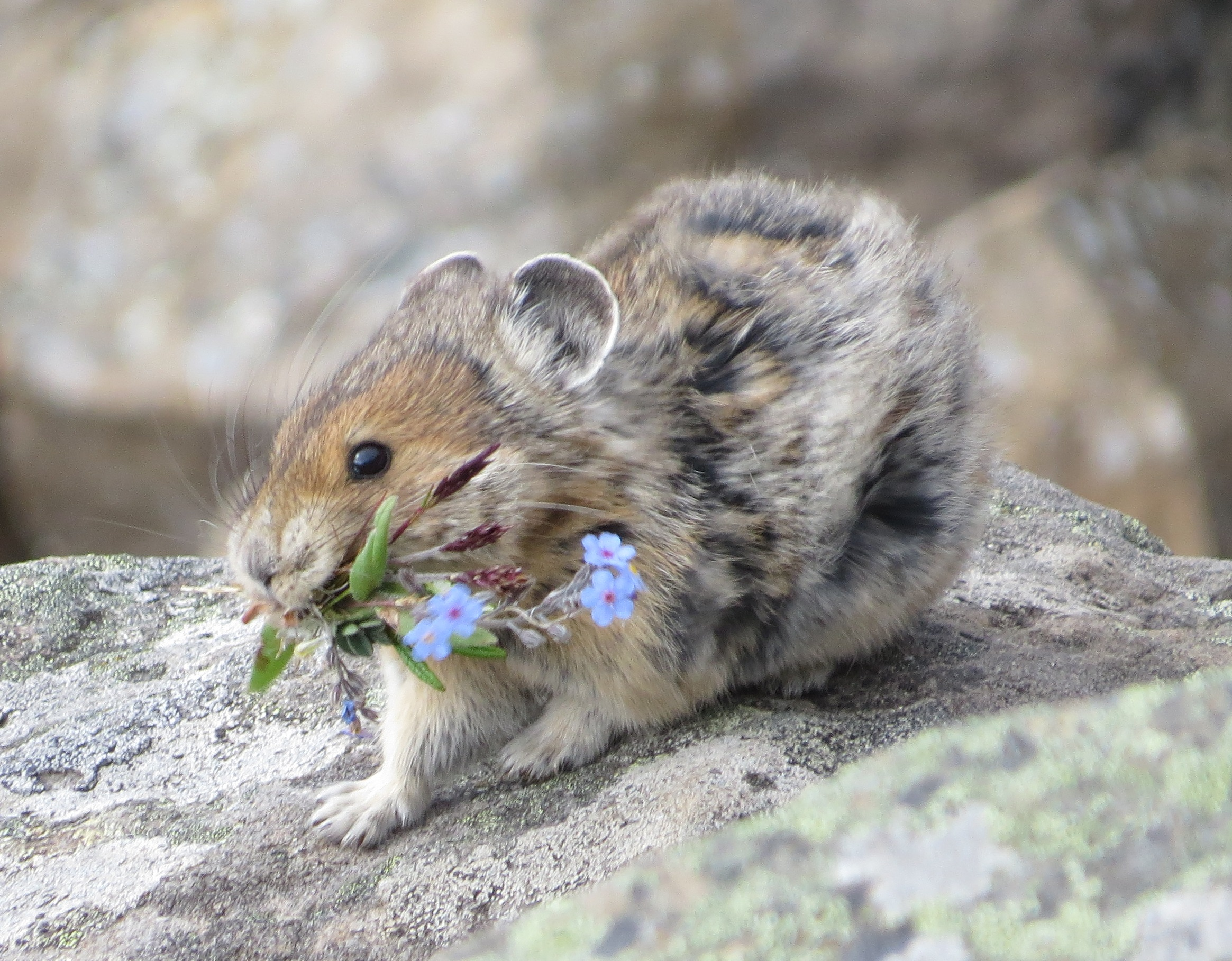
American pika carrying forget-me-not flowers and grass to store for winter food in Cawridge, Alberta, Canada

American pikas use two foraging strategies: direct consumption of food (feeding) and caching vegetation in "haypiles" for winter use (haying). They feed throughout the year, but haying is confined to summer months. Because they do not hibernate, pikas have higher energy requirements compared to many other montane mammals. During peak haying periods, an individual can make about 13 trips per hour to collect vegetation—over 100 trips per day. The timing of haying is influenced by weather patterns, particularly the amount of snow and timing of snowmelt from the previous winter. At lower elevations, haying often begins before snow has melted at higher elevations, whereas at higher elevations it continues after activity has ended in lower areas.

When haying, pikas harvest plants in a deliberate sequence corresponding to seasonal plant growth (phenology). They actively select plants with higher caloric, protein, lipid, and water content. Forbs and tall grasses are more likely to be harvested for haying than eaten immediately. Haypiles are typically stored under talus near the talus–meadow interface, though they may also be built on the talus surface. Males usually store more vegetation than females, and adults store more than juveniles.

Like all members of Lagomorpha (rabbits, hares, and pikas), the American pika practices coprophagy, producing and consuming cecotropes to extract additional nutrients from its food. Cecotropes provide more energy than stored plant material and may be eaten directly or stored for later consumption.

== Reproduction ==
Adult males and females with adjacent territories form mated pairs. When multiple males are present, females exhibit mate choice. The species is a reflex ovulator—ovulation occurs only after copulation—and is also seasonally polyestrous. Females typically produce two litters per year, with each litter averaging three young. Breeding begins roughly one month before snowmelt, and gestation lasts around 30 days. Parturition occurs as early as March at lower elevations and between April and June at higher elevations. Lactation greatly depletes fat reserves, and a female will only raise a second litter if the first fails to survive, despite undergoing postpartum estrus.

Pikas are born altricial, being blind, lightly furred, and with fully erupted teeth. Newborns weigh between 10 and 12 g (0.35 and 0.42 oz). Their eyes open at around nine days of age. Mothers spend most of the day foraging and return to the nest roughly every two hours to nurse their young. Juveniles become independent after about four weeks, coinciding with weaning. Young pikas may remain within their natal range or move to adjoining territories, generally avoiding areas occupied by relatives. Dispersal is primarily driven by competition for territories.

== Life history ==
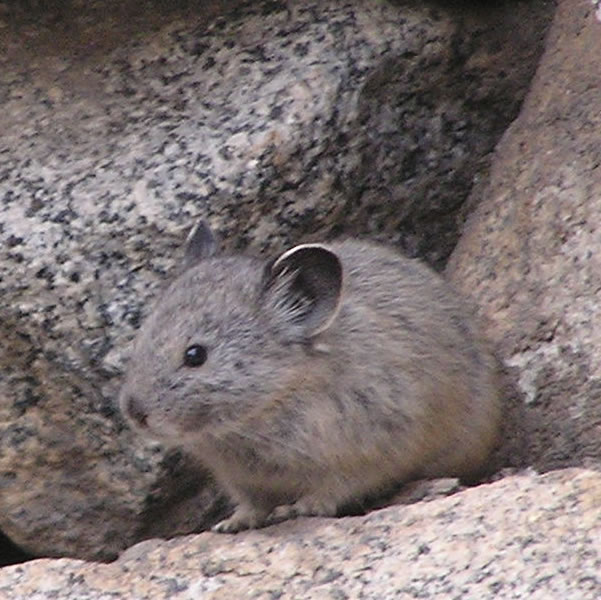
The American pika's cryptic coloration helps it blend into its environment in the Sierra Nevada.

The American pika is diurnal. The total area used by an individual pika is called its home range, approximately 55% of which is defended as territory against intruders. Territory size varies between 410 and 709 m^{2} (4,410 and 7,630 sq ft), depending on rock formation, distance to vegetation, and vegetation quality. Home ranges may overlap, with territories of mated pairs being closer together than those of same-sex neighbors. The spatial distance between members of a pair is greatest in early and midsummer and decreases in late summer and autumn. Territorial defense often involves aggressive displays, though direct confrontations are rare and typically occur between same-sex adults that are unfamiliar with one another. Intrusions onto another pika's territory usually happen when the resident is inactive. Territorial behavior increases during the haying season.

American pikas are highly vocal, using both calls and songs for communication. Short calls warn of nearby predators, while longer songs are associated with the breeding season (males only) and with territorial behavior in autumn (both sexes). Predators of the pika include eagles, hawks, coyotes, bobcats, cougars, foxes, and weasels.

== Conservation and decline ==
Because American pikas inhabit high, cool mountain regions, they are particularly sensitive to heat and are considered an early indicator species for detecting the impacts of global warming in the western United States. Rising temperatures are thought to drive American pikas to higher elevations in search of cooler conditions and suitable habitat. However, their ability to migrate in response to climate change is limited, as their current habitat is confined to small, isolated "islands" of alpine talus across mountain ranges. Pikas can die within six hours if exposed to temperatures above 25.5 °C (77.9 °F) without access to cool refuges. At lower elevations and during the midday heat, they retreat into cooler scree openings to avoid lethal temperatures. Behavioral adaptations have allowed them to persist even in mild low-elevation habitats such as the Columbia River Gorge, and hot arid environments such as Craters of the Moon National Monument and Preserve (Idaho) and Lava Beds National Monument (California), where August surface temperatures can reach 32 to 38 °C (90 to 100 °F).

Studies indicate that some populations are declining, with global warming identified as a major factor. A 2003 study published in the Journal of Mammalogy found that nine of 25 sampled populations in the Great Basin had been extirpated, prompting further research on the species' vulnerability.

In 2010, the U.S. government reviewed but ultimately declined to list the American pika under the Endangered Species Act. The IUCN Red List currently classifies the American pika as a species of least concern.

The Pikas in Peril Project, funded by the National Park Service Climate Change Response Program, ran from 2010 to 2016. Researchers from three universities and eight national parks collaborated to assess the vulnerability of the species under projected climate change scenarios.

Recent research has documented widespread extirpations and range contractions at lower elevations, where conditions are warmer and drier. These changes have been attributed to factors such as rising summer and winter temperatures and altered precipitation patterns. For example, a 2021 study reported upslope range retractions in 44 of 64 surveyed watersheds in the Northern Rockies, with average shifts of 281 m (922 ft). Similarly, a study in North Cascades National Park (Washington) found that a single winter with minimal snow cover led to severe population declines, indicating that snowpack is critical for insulating pikas from extreme winter cold.

A 2015 analysis of historical pika records across California found that both temperature and habitat configuration strongly influence where the species can persist. Surveys of 67 previously occupied sites showed that pikas were no longer present at about 15% of those locations.

Recent research in the Sierra Nevada of California has revealed that even core populations of the American pika are vulnerable to climate-related declines. A 2017 study by Stewart, Wright, and Heckman reported the disappearance of pikas from roughly 165 km² within what was once considered the center of their range in the northern Sierra Nevada, despite the persistence of apparently suitable rocky habitat.
