= Ochotona spanglei =

Ochotona spanglei Temporal range: Late Miocene or Early Pliocene, 10.3–4.9 Ma

Scientific classification
- Kingdom: Animalia
- Phylum: Chordata
- Class: Mammalia
- Order: Lagomorpha
- Family: Ochotonidae
- Genus: Ochotona
- Species: †O. spanglei

Binomial name
- †Ochotona spanglei Shotwell 1956 (Note: Ochotona spanglei in the Paleobiology Database. (Note: Additional contributors to utilized records of Paleobiology Database (authorizers supplying these records) include John Alroy.))

Extinct species of mammal

Ochotona spanglei is an extinct species of pika (mammal in the family Ochotonidae), known from Late Miocene - Early Pliocene fossil from Oregon (USA). Fossils were also found in Nebraska referred to as Ochotona cf. spanglei.

Ochotona spanglei is the earliest known pika, which inhabited North America. Pika came at the Miocene-Pliocene boundary from Eurasia. Extinction of O. spanglei was followed by an approximately three-million-year-long gap in the known North American pikas record.

== Fossil distribution ==
- McKay Reservoir, Oregon, McKay Formation, Hemphillian (10.3 - 4.9 Ma), Ochotona spanglei, the species was discovered here (Note: The Paleobiology Database collection: McKay Reservoir (Neogene of the United States).) (described from a lower jaw with complete cheek dentition)
- Honey Creek, Nebraska, Hemphillian (10.3 - 4.9 Ma), Ochotona cf. spanglei (Note: The Paleobiology Database collection: Honey Creek (Neogene of the United States).)
- Mailbox Prospect, Antelope County, Nebraska, Late/Upper Hemphillian (10.3 - 4.9 Ma), Ochotona cf. spanglei (Note: The Paleobiology Database collection: Mailbox (Neogene of the United States).)
