= Cape Deceit =

Cape in Alaska, United States

Coordinates: 66°05′52″N 162°44′54″W

Cape Deceit (Iñupiaq: Qipalut) is a cape in Alaska. It is located in the Seward Peninsula on the Chukchi Sea coast.

Cape Deceit extends into Kotzebue Sound, 2 mi. NW of Deering; Kotzebue-Kobuk Low.

This cape's name was given in 1816 by Lt. Otto von Kotzebue. "Deceit" is a translation of the German Betrug, for Kotzebue thought that there was something about the shape of the cape and its surroundings that indicated a bay that did not exist. Thus he declared it to be "deceitful".

The Eastern Beringian vole, Microtus deceitensis, has been named after Cape Deceit.
