= Goodhope Bay =

Coordinates: 66°07′18″N 163°41′39″W

Goodhope Bay is a small bay in the Kotzebue Sound, on the Chukchi Sea-facing coast of Alaska, United States. It is 16 miles (26 km) across.

It is located on the northern coast of the Seward Peninsula, 30 mi. W of Deering; Kotzebue-Kobuk Low.

Lieutenant Otto von Kotzebue named the area while exploring the region in August 1816, as he had had "good hope" in making important geographic discoveries.
