= List of leporids =

Species in mammal family Leporidae

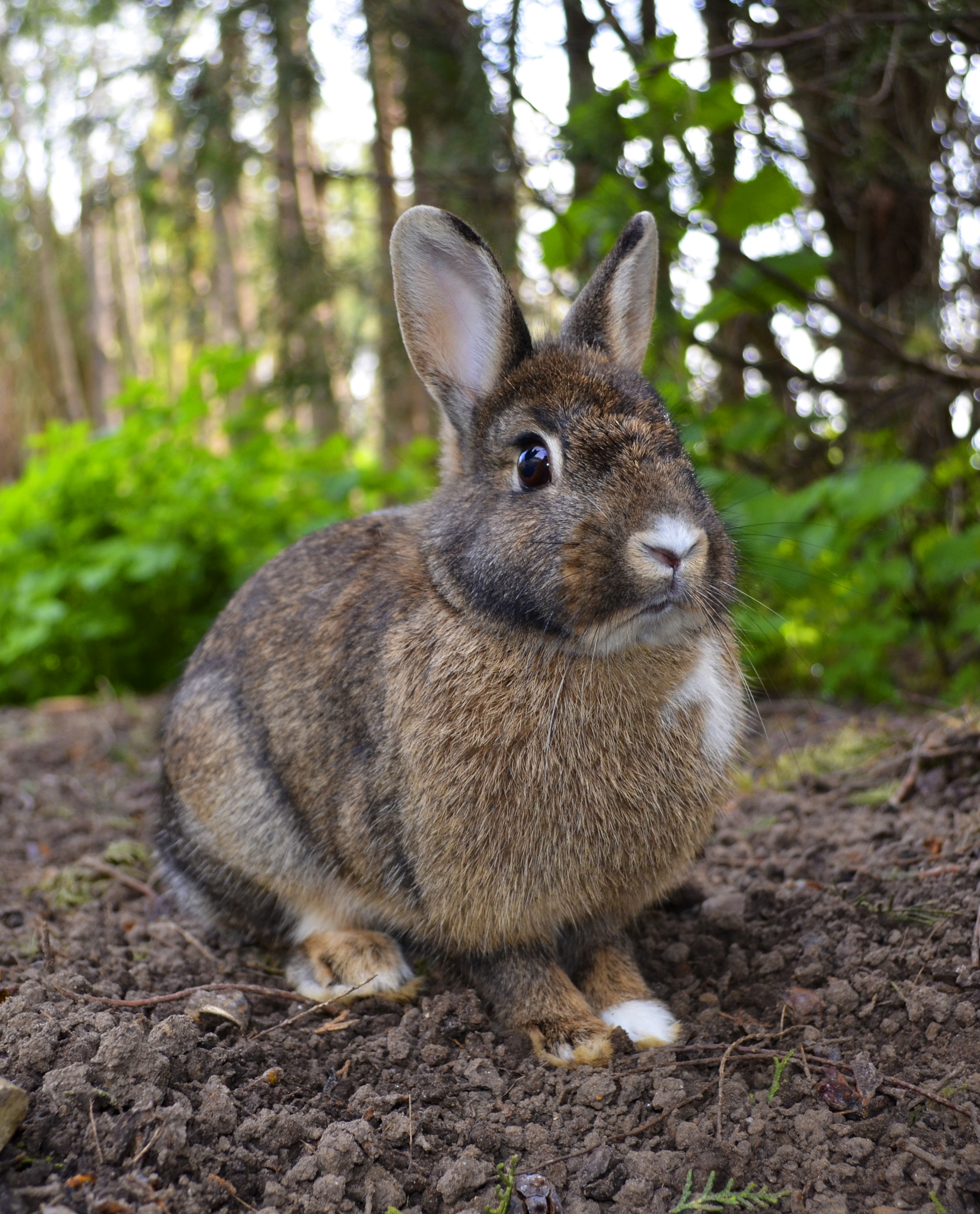
European rabbit (Oryctolagus cuniculus)

Leporidae is a family of small mammals within the order Lagomorpha. A member of this family is called a leporid, or colloquially a hare or rabbit. They are widespread worldwide, and can be found in most terrestrial biomes, though primarily in forests, savannas, shrublands, and grasslands. Leporids are all roughly the same shape and fall within a small range of sizes with short tails, ranging from the 21 cm (8 in) long Tres Marias cottontail to the 76 cm (30 in) long desert hare. Most species do not have population estimates and some are not yet evaluated for conservation status, though nine species are considered endangered and one, the riverine rabbit, is critically endangered with a population size of as low as 100. The domestic rabbit subspecies of the European rabbit has been domesticated.

The 64 extant species of Leporidae are contained within 11 genera. One genus, Lepus, contains 32 species that are collectively referred to as hares; the other eight genera are generally referred to as rabbits, with the majority – 19 species – in Sylvilagus, or the cottontail rabbits. Over one hundred extinct Leporidae species have been discovered, though due to ongoing research and discoveries the exact number and categorization is not fixed.

== Conventions ==
IUCN Red List categories
Conservation status
- EX: Extinct (0 species)
- EW: Extinct in the wild (0 species)
- CR: Critically endangered (1 species)
- EN: Endangered (9 species)
- VU: Vulnerable (8 species)
- NT: Near threatened (2 species)
- LC: Least concern (39 species)

Other categories
- DD: Data deficient (5 species)
- NE: Not evaluated (0 species)

The author citation for the species or genus is given after the scientific name; parentheses around the author citation indicate that this was not the original taxonomic placement. Conservation status codes listed follow the International Union for Conservation of Nature (IUCN) Red List of Threatened Species. Range maps are provided wherever possible; if a range map is not available, a description of the leporid's range is provided. Ranges are based on the IUCN Red List for that species unless otherwise noted. All extinct species or subspecies listed alongside extant species went extinct after 1500 CE, and are indicated by a dagger symbol "†".

== Classification ==
The family Leporidae consists of 64 extant species in 11 genera which are divided into over 200 extant subspecies. This does not include hybrid species or extinct prehistoric species.

- Genus Brachylagus: one species
- Genus Bunolagus: one species
- Genus Caprolagus: one species
- Genus Lepus: thirty-two species
- Genus Nesolagus: two species
- Genus Oryctolagus: one species
- Genus Pentalagus: one species
- Genus Poelagus: one species
- Genus Pronolagus: four species
- Genus Romerolagus: one species
- Genus Sylvilagus: nineteen species

- Leporidae
  - - Nesolagus
    - - Poelagus
      - Pronolagus
  - - Romerolagus
    - - - - - Sylvilagus
            - Brachylagus
          - - - Caprolagus
              - Oryctolagus
            - - Bunolagus
              - Pentalagus
      - Lepus

== Leporids ==
The following classification is based on the taxonomy described by Mammal Species of the World (2005), with augmentation by generally accepted proposals made since using molecular phylogenetic analysis, as supported by both the IUCN and the American Society of Mammalogists.

Genus Brachylagus – Miller, 1900 – one species
Common name	Scientific name and subspecies	Range	Size and ecology	IUCN status and estimated population
Pygmy rabbit	B. idahoensis (Merriam, 1891)	Western America (introduced in red)	Size: 23–30 cm (9–12 in) long, plus 1–3 cm (0.4–1.2 in) tail Habitat: Shrubland and desert Diet: Sagebrush, as well as grass and other plants	LC Unknown

Genus Bunolagus – Thomas, 1929 – one species
Common name	Scientific name and subspecies	Range	Size and ecology	IUCN status and estimated population
Riverine rabbit	B. monticularis (Thomas, 1903)	Southern South Africa	Size: 33–47 cm (13–19 in) long, plus 7–11 cm (3–4 in) tail Habitat: Shrubland Diet: Shrubs as well as grass	CR 100-200

Genus Caprolagus – Blyth, 1845 – one species
Common name	Scientific name and subspecies	Range	Size and ecology	IUCN status and estimated population
Hispid hare	C. hispidus (Blyth, 1845)	Himalayas	Size: 38–50 cm (15–20 in) long, plus 2–4 cm (1–2 in) tail Habitat: Grassland and inland wetlands Diet: Grass as well as other plants	EN Unknown

Genus Lepus – Linnaeus, 1758 – thirty-two species
Common name	Scientific name and subspecies	Range	Size and ecology	IUCN status and estimated population
Abyssinian hare	L. habessinicus Hemprich, Ehrenberg, 1832 Four subspecies: L. h. angolensis; L. h. microtis; L. h. senegalensis; L. h. whytei	Horn of Africa	Size: 44–45 cm (17–18 in) long Habitat: Savanna, grassland, and desert Diet: Grass, shrubs, and forbs	LC Unknown
African savanna hare	L. victoriae Heuglin, 1865	Sub-Saharan Africa	Size: 41–58 cm (16–23 in) long Habitat: Savanna, shrubland, and grassland Diet: Variety of plants	LC Unknown
Alaskan hare	L. othus Merriam, 1900 Two subspecies: L. o. othus; L. o. tschuktschorum	Western Alaska	Size: 50–60 cm (20–24 in) long, plus 6–11 cm (2–4 in) tail Habitat: Forest, shrubland, and grassland Diet: Dwarf willow, grass, sedges, and other plants	LC Unknown
Antelope jackrabbit	L. alleni Mearns, 1890 Three subspecies: L. a. alleni; L. a. palitans; L. a. tiburonensis	Southwestern North America	Size: 43–70 cm (17–28 in) long, plus 5–14 cm (2–6 in) tail Habitat: Shrubland, grassland, and desert Diet: Grass, velvet mesquite, and cacti	LC Unknown
Arctic hare	L. arcticus Ross, 1819 Four subspecies: L. a. arcticus; L. a. bangsii; L. a. groenlandicus; L. a. monstrabilis	Arctic North America	Size: 56–66 cm (22–26 in) long, plus 4–10 cm (2–4 in) tail Habitat: Forest, shrubland, and grassland Diet: Woody plants	LC Unknown
Black jackrabbit	L. insularis Bryant, 1891	Tip of Baja California	Size: 54–61 cm (21–24 in) long, plus 6–12 cm (2–5 in) tail Habitat: Shrubland, grassland, caves, desert, and coastal marine Diet: Grass, as well as tree bark	VU 900
Black-tailed jackrabbit	L. californicus Gray, 1837 Six subspecies: L. c. californicus; L. c. deserticola; L. c. insularis; L. c. magdalenae; L. c. melanotis; L. c. texianus	Western and central North America	Size: 47–63 cm (19–25 in) long, plus 5–12 cm (2–5 in) tail Habitat: Forest, savanna, shrubland, grassland, and desert Diet: Grass and herbs, as well as twigs and bark	LC Unknown
Broom hare	L. castroviejoi Arribas, 1977	Northern Spain	Size: 41–59 cm (16–23 in) long Habitat: Forest and shrubland Diet: Grass, herbs, field crops, twigs, buds, and bark	VU Unknown
Burmese hare	L. peguensis Blyth, 1855 Two subspecies: L. p. peguensis; L. p. vassali	Southeastern Asia	Size: 40–59 cm (16–23 in) long, plus 5–9 cm (2–4 in) tail Habitat: Forest, savanna, shrubland, and grassland Diet: Grass, bark and twigs	LC Unknown
Cape hare	L. capensis Linnaeus, 1758 Twelve subspecies: L. c. aegyptius; L. c. aquilo; L. c. arabicus; L. c. atlanticus; L. c. capensis; L. c. carpi; L. c. granti; L. c. hawkeri; L. c. isabellinus; L. c. schlumbergeri; L. c. sinaiticus; L. c. whitakeri	Africa and western Asia	Size: 52–60 cm (20–24 in) long Habitat: Shrubland, grassland, and desert Diet: Grass, shrubs, and herbs	LC Unknown
Chinese hare	L. sinensis Gray, 1832 Three subspecies: L. s. formosus; L. s. sinensis; L. s. yuenshanensis	Southeastern China and Taiwan	Size: 36–42 cm (14–17 in) long, plus 17 cm (7 in) tail Habitat: Shrubland and grassland Diet: Leafy plants, green shoots, and twigs	LC Unknown
Corsican hare	L. corsicanus Winton, 1898	Southern Italy	Size: 55–61 cm (22–24 in) long Habitat: Forest, shrubland, grassland, and coastal marine Diet: Grass, as well as mint, sedges, rushes, peas, and flowers	VU Unknown
Desert hare	L. tibetanus Waterhouse, 1841 Five subspecies: L. t. centrasiaticus; L. t. craspedotis; L. t. pamirensis; L. t. stoliczkanus; L. t. tibetanus	Northwestern China	Size: 40–76 cm (16–30 in) long Habitat: Shrubland, grassland, and desert Diet: Variety of plants as well as seeds, berries, roots, and twigs	LC Unknown
Ethiopian hare	L. fagani Thomas, 1903	Ethiopia	Size: 42–50 cm (17–20 in) long, plus 7–11 cm (3–4 in) tail Habitat: Savanna, shrubland, and grassland Diet: Unknown plants	LC Unknown
Ethiopian highland hare	L. starcki Petter, 1963	Central Ethiopia	Size: 46–60 cm (18–24 in) long, plus 7–12 cm (3–5 in) tail Habitat: Shrubland and grassland Diet: Grass as well as shrubs	LC Unknown
European hare	L. europaeus Pallas, 1778 Sixteen subspecies: L. e. caspicus; L. e. connori; L. e. creticus; L. e. cyprius; L. e. cyrensis; L. e. europaeus; L. e. hybridus; L. e. judeae; L. e. karpathorum; L. e. medius; L. e. occidentalis; L. e. parnassius; L. e. ponticus; L. e. rhodius; L. e. syriacus; L. e. transsylvanicus	Europe, western Asia, northeastern North America, southern South America, eastern Oceana (introduced in light red)	Size: 60–75 cm (24–30 in) long, plus 7–11 cm (3–4 in) tail Habitat: Shrubland and grassland Diet: Grass, herbs, field crops, twigs, buds, and bark	LC Unknown
Granada hare	L. granatensis Rosenhauer, 1856 Three subspecies: L. g. gallaecius; L. g. granatensis; L. g. solisi (Majorcan hare)	Iberian Peninsula (introduced in pink)	Size: 44–48 cm (17–19 in) long, plus 9–12 cm (4–5 in) tail Habitat: Forest, shrubland, and grassland Diet: Buds, twigs, bark, and crops	LC Unknown
Hainan hare	L. hainanus Swinhoe, 1870	Hainan Island, China	Size: 35–40 cm (14–16 in) long, plus 4–7 cm (2–3 in) tail Habitat: Shrubland and grassland Diet: Plants	EN Unknown
Indian hare	L. nigricollis F. Cuvier, 1823 Seven subspecies: L. n. aryabertensis; L. n. dayanus; L. n. nigricollis; L. n. ruficaudatus; L. n. sadiya; L. n. simcoxi; L. n. singhala	Indian subcontinent	Size: 40–70 cm (16–28 in) long Habitat: Forest, shrubland, grassland, inland wetlands, and desert Diet: Grass and flowering plants	LC Unknown
Japanese hare	L. brachyurus Temminck, 1845 Four subspecies: L. b. angustidens; L. b. brachyurus; L. b. lyoni; L. b. okiensis	Japan	Size: 45–54 cm (18–21 in) long, plus 2–5 cm (1–2 in) tail Habitat: Forest, shrubland, and grassland Diet: Grass, buds, seedlings, and shrubs	LC Unknown
Korean hare	L. coreanus Thomas, 1892	Korea	Size: 45–54 cm (18–21 in) long, plus 2–5 cm (1–2 in) tail Habitat: Shrubland and grassland Diet: Grass, shrubs, and bark	LC Unknown
Manchurian hare	L. mandshuricus Radde, 1861	Eastern Asia	Size: 41–54 cm (16–21 in) long, plus 5–8 cm (2–3 in) tail Habitat: Forest Diet: Bark and twigs, as well as shrubs, herbs, and fruit	LC Unknown
Mountain hare	L. timidus Linnaeus, 1758 Fifteen subspecies: L. t. ainu; L. t. begitschevi; L. t. gichiganus; L. t. hibernicus; L. t. kamtschaticus; L. t. kolymensis; L. t. kozhevnikovi; L. t. lugubris; L. t. mordeni; L. t. orii; L. t. scoticus; L. t. sibiricorum; L. t. timidus; L. t. transbaicalicus; L. t. varronis	Europe and northern Asia	Size: 50–55 cm (20–22 in) long, plus 5–7 cm (2–3 in) tail Habitat: Forest, shrubland, grassland, and inland wetlands Diet: Seeds, berries, roots, twigs, and other plants	LC Unknown
Scrub hare	L. saxatilis F. Cuvier, 1823 Two subspecies: L. s. saxatilis; L. s. subrufus	Southern Africa	Size: 45–65 cm (18–26 in) long Habitat: Savanna, shrubland, grassland, and desert Diet: Grass	LC Unknown
Snowshoe hare	L. americanus Erxleben, 1777 Six subspecies: L. a. americanus; L. a. bairdii; L. a. cascadensis; L. a. dalli; L. a. struthopus; L. a. virginianus	Northern North America	Size: 38–51 cm (15–20 in) long, plus 4–6 cm (1.6–2.4 in) tail Habitat: Forest and shrubland Diet: Grass, forbs, sedges, and ferns	LC Unknown
Tehuantepec jackrabbit	L. flavigularis Wagner, 1844	Small region of southern Mexico	Size: 56–61 cm (22–24 in) long Habitat: Savanna, shrubland, grassland, and coastal marine Diet: Grass, as well as other plants	EN 300
Tolai hare	L. tolai Pallas, 1778 Eight subspecies: L. t. aurigineus; L. t. buchariensis; L. t. cheybani; L. t. cinnamomeus; L. t. filchneri; L. t. lehmanni; L. t. swinhoei; L. t. tolai	Central and eastern Asia	Size: 40–59 cm (16–23 in) long, plus 7–11 cm (3–4 in) tail Habitat: Grassland and rocky areas Diet: Roots, grass, and herbs	LC Unknown
White-sided jackrabbit	L. callotis Wagler, 1830 Two subspecies: L. c. callotis; L. c. gaillardi	Southern North America	Size: 43–60 cm (17–24 in) long, plus 4–10 cm (2–4 in) tail Habitat: Shrubland and grassland Diet: Grass and sedges	VU Unknown
White-tailed jackrabbit	L. townsendii Bachman, 1839 Two subspecies: L. t. campanius; L. t. townsendii	Central and northern North America	Size: 53–60 cm (21–24 in) long Habitat: Shrubland and grassland Diet: Grass and forbs, as well as shrubs	LC Unknown
Woolly hare	L. oiostolus Hodgson, 1840 Four subspecies: L. o. hypsibius; L. o. oiostolus; L. o. pallipes; L. o. przewalskii	Central Asia	Size: 40–50 cm (16–20 in) long, plus 9 cm (4 in) tail Habitat: Shrubland, grassland, and desert Diet: Grass and leaves, as well as fruit and crops	LC Unknown
Yarkand hare	L. yarkandensis Günther, 1875	Western China	Size: 28–43 cm (11–17 in) long, plus 5–9 cm (2–4 in) tail Habitat: Forest and shrubland Diet: Grass and crops	NT Unknown
Yunnan hare	L. comus Allen, 1927	Southern China	Size: 28–43 cm (11–17 in) long, plus 5–9 cm (2–4 in) tail Habitat: Grassland Diet: Forbs and shrubs	LC Unknown

Genus Nesolagus – Major, 1899 – two species
Common name	Scientific name and subspecies	Range	Size and ecology	IUCN status and estimated population
Annamite striped rabbit	N. timminsi Averianov, Abramov, Tikhonov, 2000	Annamite Range in Southeastern Asia	Size: 35–40 cm (14–16 in) long Habitat: Forest Diet: Unknown plants	EN Unknown
Sumatran striped rabbit	N. netscheri (Schlegel, 1880)	Sumatra	Size: 36–42 cm (14–17 in) long, plus 17 cm (7 in) tail Habitat: Forest Diet: Cyrtandra plants	DD Unknown

Genus Oryctolagus – Lilljeborg, 1762 – one species
Common name	Scientific name and subspecies	Range	Size and ecology	IUCN status and estimated population
European rabbit	O. cuniculus (Linnaeus, 1758) Seven subspecies: O. c. algirus (Iberian rabbit); O. c. brachyotus (Camargue rabbit); O. c. cnossius (Cretan rabbit); O. c. cuniculus (Common rabbit); O. c. domesticus (Domestic rabbit); O. c. habetensis (African rabbit); O. c. huxleyi (Mediterranean rabbit)	Europe, southern South America, and Oceania (introduced in blue)	Size: 38–50 cm (15–20 in) long Habitat: Forest, savanna, shrubland, and grassland Diet: Grass, leaves, buds, bark, and roots	EN Unknown

Genus Pentalagus – Lyon, 1904 – one species
Common name	Scientific name and subspecies	Range	Size and ecology	IUCN status and estimated population
Amami rabbit	P. furnessi (Stone, 1900)	Southern tip of Japan	Size: 39–53 cm (15–21 in) long, plus 2–4 cm (1–2 in) tail Habitat: Forest, shrubland, and intertidal marine Diet: Herbs, shrubs, and acorns	EN Unknown

Genus Poelagus – St. Leger, 1932 – one species
Common name	Scientific name and subspecies	Range	Size and ecology	IUCN status and estimated population
Bunyoro rabbit	P. marjorita (St. Leger, 1929)	Central Africa	Size: 45–50 cm (18–20 in) long, plus 4–5 cm (1.6–2.0 in) tail Habitat: Forest, savanna, and rocky areas Diet: Grass, shrubs, forbs, and tubers	LC Unknown

Genus Pronolagus – Lyon, 1904 – four species
Common name	Scientific name and subspecies	Range	Size and ecology	IUCN status and estimated population
Hewitt's red rock hare	P. saundersiae Hewitt, 1927	Southern Africa	Size: 38–54 cm (15–21 in) long, plus 5–12 cm (2–5 in) tail Habitat: Shrubland, grassland, and rocky areas Diet: Grass	LC 10,000
Jameson's red rock hare	P. randensis Jameson, 1907 Three subspecies: P. r. caucinus; P. r. randensis; P. r. whitei	Southern Africa	Size: 42–50 cm (17–20 in) long Habitat: Shrubland, grassland, and rocky areas Diet: Grass	LC Unknown
Natal red rock hare	P. crassicaudatus (Geoffroy, 1832) Two subspecies: P. c. crassicaudatus; P. c. ruddi	Southern Africa	Size: 46–56 cm (18–22 in) long, plus 3–11 cm (1–4 in) tail Habitat: Shrubland, grassland, and rocky areas Diet: Grass	LC Unknown
Smith's red rock hare	P. rupestris Smith, 1834 Five subspecies: P. r. curryi; P. r. nyikae; P. r. rupestris; P. r. saundersiae; P. r. vallicola	Southern Africa	Size: 38–54 cm (15–21 in) long, plus 5–12 cm (2–5 in) tail Habitat: Grassland, rocky areas, and desert Diet: Grass, herbs, and shrubs	LC 10,000

Genus Romerolagus – Merriam, 1896 – one species
Common name	Scientific name and subspecies	Range	Size and ecology	IUCN status and estimated population
Volcano rabbit	R. diazi (Ferrari-Pérez, 1893)	Southern Mexico	Size: 27–32 cm (11–13 in) long, plus 1–4 cm (0.4–1.6 in) tail Habitat: Forest and grassland Diet: Grass	EN 7,000

Genus Sylvilagus – Gray, 1867 – nineteen species
Common name	Scientific name and subspecies	Range	Size and ecology	IUCN status and estimated population
Andean tapeti	S. andinus (Thomas, 1897)	Northern Andes	Size: 33–36 cm (13–14 in) long, plus 2–4 cm (1–2 in) tail Habitat: Grassland Diet: Grass and sedges	DD Unknown
Appalachian cottontail	S. obscurus Chapman, Cramer, Dippenaar, Robinson, 1992	Eastern America	Size: 32–41 cm (13–16 in) long, plus 2–7 cm (1–3 in) tail Habitat: Forest, shrubland, and inland wetlands Diet: Ferns, grass, forbs, shrubs, and conifer needles	NT Unknown
Brush rabbit	S. bachmani (Waterhouse, 1839) Six subspecies: S. b. bachmani; S. b. cerrosensis; S. b. cinerascens; S. b. exiguus; S. b. howelli; S. b. ubericolor	Western North America	Size: 30–37 cm (12–15 in) long, plus 1–3 cm (0.4–1.2 in) tail Habitat: Forest, shrubland, grassland, inland wetlands, and desert Diet: Grass, as well as other plants	LC Unknown
Central American tapeti	S. gabbi (Allen, 1877)	Central America	Size: Unknown Habitat: Forest Diet: Unknown plants	LC Unknown
Coastal tapeti	S. tapetillus Thomas, 1913	Rio de Janeiro, Brazil	Size: Unknown Habitat: Grassland Diet: Unknown plants	VU Unknown
Common tapeti	S. brasiliensis (Linnaeus, 1758) Seventeen subspecies: S. b. apollinaris (Bogota tapeti); S. b. brasiliensis; S. b. capsalis; S. b. caracasensis; S. b. chillae; S. b. chotanus; S. b. defilippi; S. b. fulvescens (Fulvous tapeti); S. b. gibsoni; S. b. inca; S. b. kelloggi; S. b. meridensis; S. b. minensis; S. b. paraguensis; S. b. peruanus; S. b. surdaster (Western tapeti); S. b. truei	Northeastern Brazil	Size: Unknown Habitat: Forest Diet: Unknown plants	EN Unknown
Davis Mountains cottontail	S. robustus Bailey, 1905	Mexico and southern United States	Size: Unknown Habitat: Forest Diet: Unknown plants	VU Unknown
Desert cottontail	S. audubonii (Baird, 1858) Seven subspecies: S. a. arizonae; S. a. audubonii; S. a. baileyi; S. a. confinis; S. a. goldmani; S. a. minor; S. a. warreni	Western North America	Size: 37–40 cm (15–16 in) long, plus 5–6 cm (2.0–2.4 in) tail Habitat: Forest, shrubland, grassland, and desert Diet: Forbs, grass, and shrubs	LC Unknown
Dice's cottontail	S. dicei Harris Jr., 1932	Costa Rica and Panama	Size: 34–45 cm (13–18 in) long, plus 2–4 cm (1–2 in) tail Habitat: Forest, shrubland, and grassland Diet: Unknown plants	VU Unknown
Eastern cottontail	S. floridanus (Allen, 1890) Seventeen subspecies: S. f. alacer; S. f. avius; S. f. aztecus; S. f. chapmani; S. f. connectens; S. f. cumanicus; S. f. floridanus; S. f. hesperius; S. f. holzneri (Robust cottontail); S. f. hondurensis; S. f. macrocorpus; S. f. mallurus; S. f. margaritae; S. f. nigronuchalis; S. f. orinoci; S. f. orizabae; S. f. purgatus; S. f. superciliaris; S. f. yucatanicus	North America, Central America, and northern South America	Size: 39–48 cm (15–19 in) long, plus 2–7 cm (1–3 in) tail Habitat: Forest, savanna, shrubland, grassland, inland wetlands, rocky areas, and desert Diet: Variety of plants	LC Unknown
Marsh rabbit	S. palustris (Bachman, 1837) Three subspecies: S. p. paludicola (Florida marsh rabbit); S. p. palustris (Carolina marsh rabbit); S. p. hefneri (Lower Keys marsh rabbit)	Eastern America	Size: 42–44 cm (17–17 in) long Habitat: Forest, grassland, inland wetlands, and intertidal marine Diet: Berries, rhizomes, bulbs, grass, and other plants	LC Unknown
Mexican cottontail	S. cunicularius (Horsfield, 1848) Two subspecies: S. c. cunicularius; S. c. insolitus	Southern Mexico	Size: 48–52 cm (19–20 in) long, plus 5–7 cm (2–3 in) tail Habitat: Forest, shrubland, grassland, and desert Diet: Unknown plants	LC Unknown
Mountain cottontail	S. nuttallii (Bachman, 1837) Three subspecies: S. n. grangeri; S. n. nuttallii; S. n. pinetis	Western North America	Size: 28–36 cm (11–14 in) long, plus 3–6 cm (1–2 in) tail Habitat: Forest and shrubland Diet: Sagebrush and grass	LC Unknown
New England cottontail	S. transitionalis (Bangs, 1895)	New England	Size: 39–44 cm (15–17 in) long Habitat: Forest, shrubland, and inland wetlands Diet: Grass, forbs, and twigs	VU 17,000
Omilteme cottontail	S. insonus Nelson, 1904	Sierra Madre del Sur in Mexico	Size: 39–44 cm (15–17 in) long, plus 4–5 cm (1.6–2.0 in) tail Habitat: Forest Diet: Unknown plants	DD Unknown
Santa Marta tapeti	S. sanctaemartae Hershkovitz, 1950	Columbia	Size: Unknown Habitat: Forest, grassland Diet: Unknown plants	DD Unknown
Swamp rabbit	S. aquaticus (Bachman, 1837) Two subspecies: S. a. aquaticus; S. a. littoralis	Southern America	Size: 45–55 cm (18–22 in) long, plus 5–8 cm (2–3 in) tail Habitat: Forest, shrubland, grassland, and inland wetlands Diet: Grass, sedges, shrubs, bark, seedlings, and twigs	LC Unknown
Tres Marias cottontail	S. graysoni (Allen, 1877)	Southwestern Mexico	Size: 21–48 cm (8–19 in) long, plus 1–6 cm (0.4–2.4 in) tail Habitat: Forest, savanna, and shrubland Diet: Wide variety of plants	EN Unknown
Venezuelan lowland rabbit	S. varynaensis Durant & Guevara, 2001	Venezuela	Size: 41–49 cm (16–19 in) long, plus 2–3 cm (0.8–1.2 in) tail Habitat: Forest and savanna Diet: Sida plants	DD Unknown

== Sources ==
- Feldhamer, George A.; Thompson, Bruce Carlyle; Chapman, Joseph A. (2003). Wild Mammals of North America. Johns Hopkins University Press. ISBN 978-0-8018-7416-1.
- Kingdon, Jonathan (2015). The Kingdon Field Guide to African Mammals (Second ed.). Bloomsbury Publishing. ISBN 978-1-4729-2531-2.
- Kurta, Allen (1995). Mammals of the Great Lakes Region. University of Michigan Press. ISBN 978-0-472-06497-7.
- Smith, Andrew T.; Johnston, Charlotte H.; Alves, Paolo C.; Hackländer, Klaus, eds. (2018). Lagomorphs: Pikas, Rabbits, and Hares of the World. Johns Hopkins University Press. ISBN 978-1-4214-2340-1.
- Smith, Andrew T.; Xie, Yan; Hoffmann, Robert S.; Lunde, Darrin; MacKinnon, John; Wilson, Don E.; Wozencraft, W. Chris, eds. (2010). A Guide to the Mammals of China. Princeton University Press. ISBN 978-1-4008-3411-2.
- Verts, B. J.; Carraway, Leslie N. (1998). Land Mammals of Oregon. University of California Press. ISBN 978-0-520-21199-5.
- Hoffmann, Robert S.; Smith, Andrew T. (2005). Wilson, Don E.; Reeder, DeeAnn M. (eds.). Mammal Species of the World. Vol. 1 (3rd ed.). Johns Hopkins University Press. ISBN 978-0-8018-8221-0.
