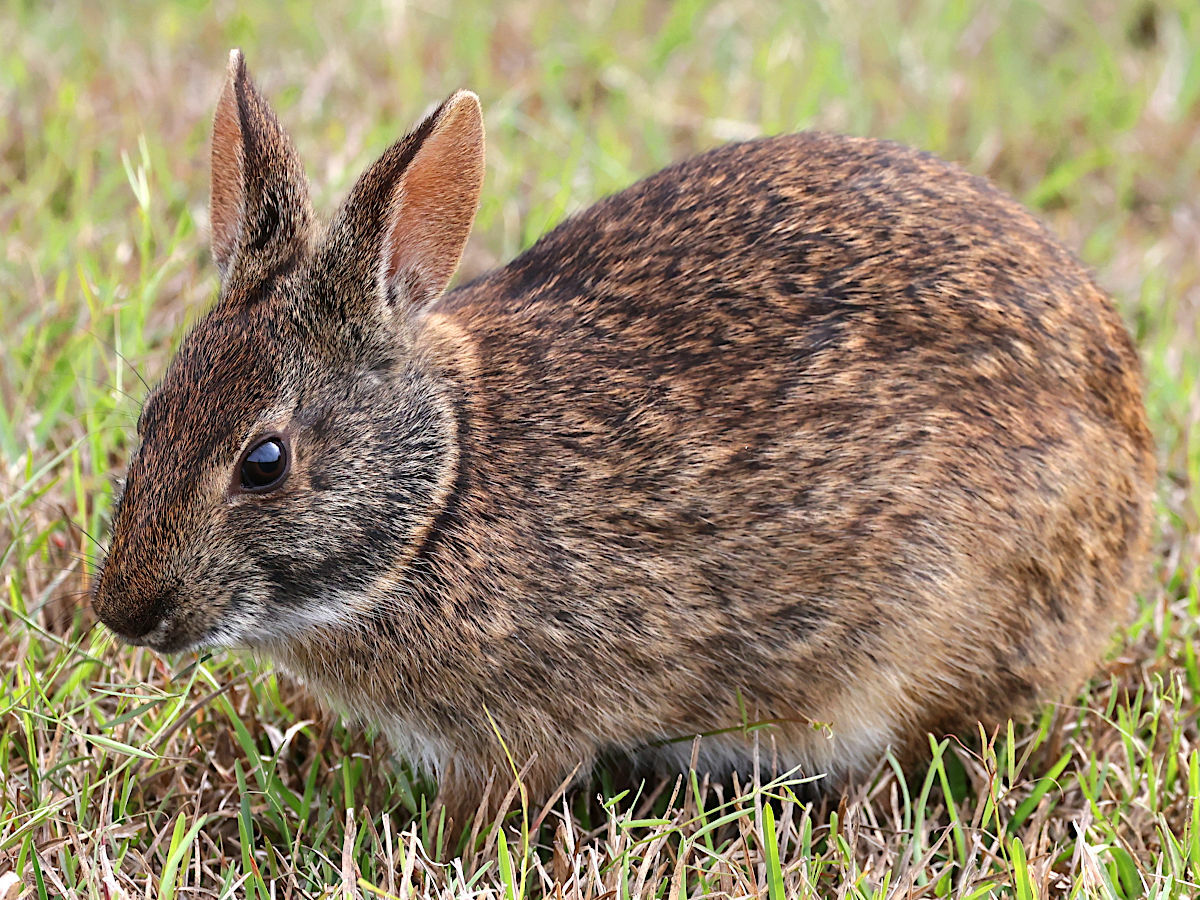
- Sweetwater Wetlands Park, Gainesville, Florida, United States

Conservation status
- Least Concern (IUCN 3.1)

Scientific classification
- Kingdom: Animalia
- Phylum: Chordata
- Class: Mammalia
- Infraclass: Placentalia
- Order: Lagomorpha
- Family: Leporidae
- Genus: Sylvilagus
- Species: S. palustris

Binomial name
- Sylvilagus palustris (Bachman, 1837)

Subspecies
- S. p. palustris; S. p. paludicola; S. p. hefneri
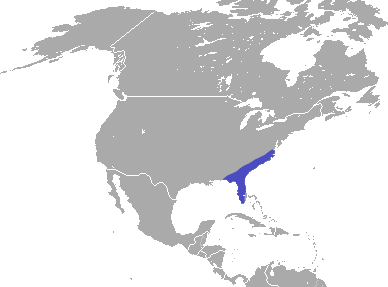
- Marsh rabbit range

Synonyms
- Lepus palustris Bachman, 1837; Lepus douglasii J. E. Gray, 1837; Lepus douglasii Fitzinger, 1867; Lepus paludicola G. S. Miller & Bangs, 1894; Limnolagus palustris Lyon, 1904

= Marsh rabbit =

Marsh rabbit Temporal range: Pleistocene–recent 0.774–0 Ma

Species of mammal

The marsh rabbit (Sylvilagus palustris) is a small cottontail rabbit found in marshes and swamps of coastal regions of the Eastern and Southern United States, from Virginia to the lower Florida Keys. Being a small brown rabbit, it is similar in appearance to the widespread eastern cottontail (Sylvilagus floridanus), but is characterized by its smaller ears, legs, and tail, as well as its grayish-brown underparts.

Marsh rabbits are common throughout their range, except for in the Everglades, where the invasive Burmese python has reduced their numbers, and the lower Florida Keys, where the subspecies known as the Lower Keys marsh rabbit (Sylvilagus palustris hefneri) is threatened by rising sea levels and human development of the land. They prefer to live in marshes, swamps, and alongside coastal waters and rivers, as they are excellent swimmers. The marsh rabbit is often compared to the aquatic swamp rabbit (Sylvilagus aquaticus), which is found along the Gulf coast and further inland in the southeastern United States, though the swamp rabbit has larger ears, tail and legs, as well as a distinctly white underside of its tail.

Like other rabbits, the marsh rabbit is a herbivore, and will eat the leaves and bulbs of various aquatic plants, such as cattails and marsh pennywort. It will also eat crops, such as carrot, sweet potato, and sugar cane, which has caused it to be labeled as a pest. The marsh rabbit is nocturnal and will dig out shelters in the ground with its long toenails to hide and rest in during the daytime, and though it does not create burrows like some other rabbits, it will take advantage of those left behind by other animals. The rabbit's long nails also help it to swim. Some predators of the marsh rabbit include birds of prey, such as owls and the northern harrier, and land animals like bobcats and snakes. Rabbit ticks and other parasites are often found on and in the marsh rabbit, and cases of tularemia and mange are known from it as well.

Humans have some history with marsh rabbits, with the species' diet of aquatic and cultivated plants making it considered as a pest, especially in Florida where sugar cane is grown. Some states regulate marsh rabbits as game animals for hunting, where patches of dried grass may be burned to flush them out. As food, the marsh rabbit may be stewed, or it may be marinated, floured, and fried. The term "marsh rabbit" is used in some restaurants in the eastern United States as a euphemism for muskrat meat. Due to how common it is across most of its range, the marsh rabbit is classified as a least-concern species by the International Union for Conservation of Nature.

== Taxonomy, etymology and phylogeny ==
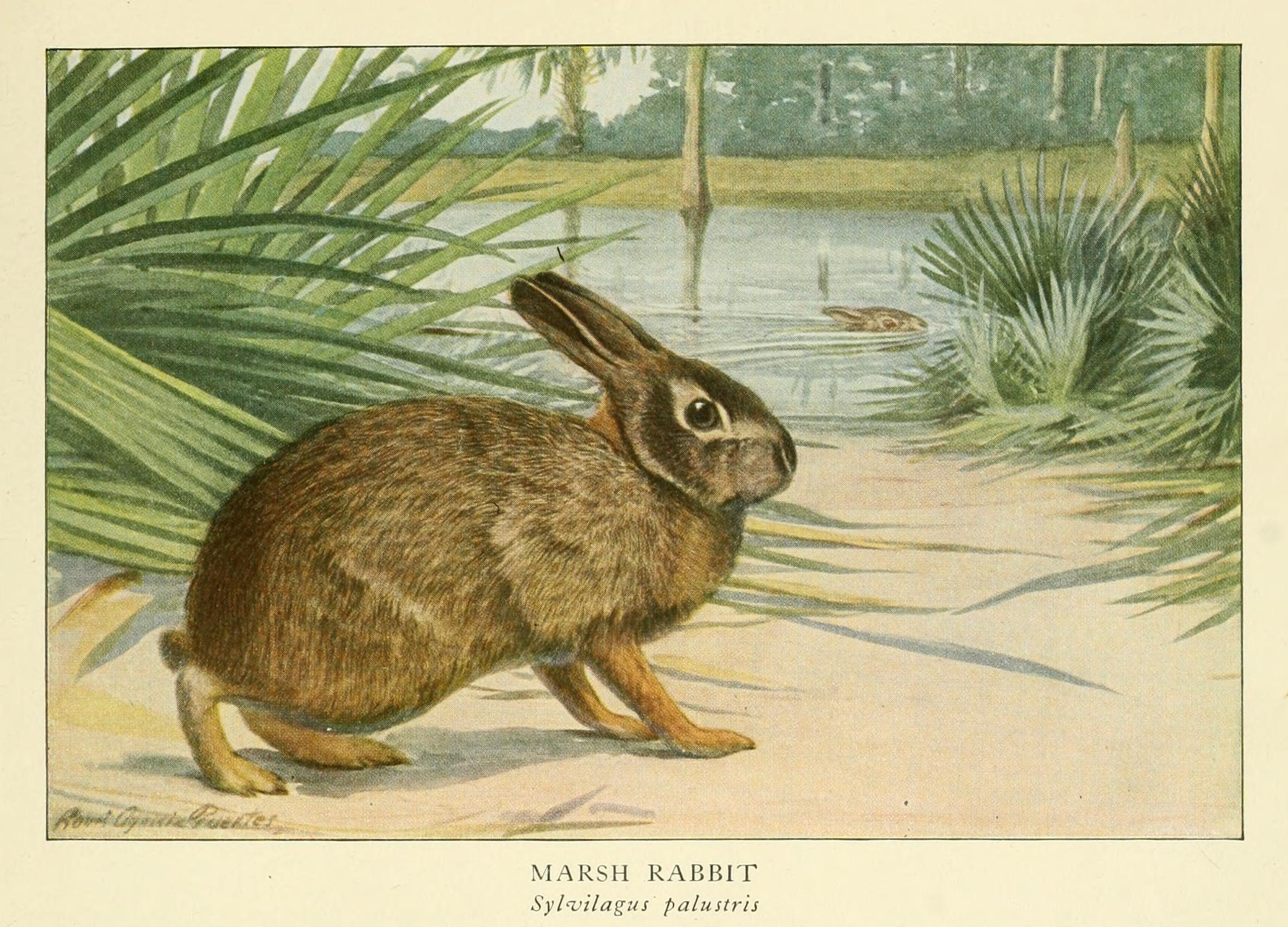
1918 illustration by Louis Agassiz Fuertes

=== Taxonomy ===
The marsh rabbit was first described by the American naturalist John Bachman in 1837, who had discovered the species in South Carolina 15 years prior and gave the specimen he recovered to the Charleston Museum. As the specimen had gone undescribed by all other naturalists during that period, Bachman used his knowledge of the rabbits he had examined since then to describe the new species Lepus palustris, the "swamp hare". Bachman noted it as being different from the snowshoe hare (Lepus americanus) in that it would readily swim through bodies of water rather than going around them. Its type locality was restricted to be "eastern South Carolina" in 1901. In 1904, it was placed in the genus Limnolagus by American mammalogist Marcus Ward Lyon Jr.; the name was previously used as the subgenus of both the marsh rabbit and swamp rabbit (Sylvilagus aquaticus) in an 1899 work by the Swiss physician Charles Immanuel Forsyth Major. Edward William Nelson, an American naturalist, clarified several years later in 1909 that the species belonged to Sylvilagus and grouped it alongside the larger swamp rabbit, which is native to the southeastern United States and Gulf Coast as far east as South Carolina and is not synoymous with the marsh rabbit.

The marsh hare's scientific name, Sylvilagus palustris, is derived from Latin. The genus name sylvilagus is a combination of silva ('forest') and lagos ('hare'), meaning "hare of the woods". The species name palustris means "marsh loving".

=== Fossil record ===
Fossils of the marsh rabbit are known from Florida, South Carolina, and Georgia. The oldest of these fossils may be from the Rancholabrean age of North America, about 774,000 years ago, but most are found in deposits that are dated to the late Pleistocene age. Much of the fossil evidence of marsh rabbits comes from deposits in the coastal plains of Melbourne, Florida, and is largely between 125,000 and 75,000 years old. An increase in rain throughout this region in the period 6,500 to 5,000 years ago is considered the main cause of the marsh rabbit's spread throughout its current distribution.

=== Phylogeny ===
In the subgenus Tapeti in the genus Sylvilagus, marsh rabbits and swamp rabbits share a chromosomal karyotype derived from a common ancestor and have a diploid number of 2n=38. Molecular data analysis from sequencing the mitochondrial 12S ribosomal RNA gene, which has been considered particularly useful in determining genetic relationships between species, confirms that S. palustris and S. aquaticus are sister taxa.

The following cladogram showing the genetic relationships between the marsh rabbit and other cottontail rabbits is based on nuclear and mitochondrial gene analysis:

Cottontail rabbits

- - - - - - - - Sylvilagus audubonii
              - Sylvilagus nuttallii
            - - Sylvilagus aquaticus
              - Sylvilagus palustris
          - - - Sylvilagus transitionalis
              - Sylvilagus obscurus
            - - Sylvilagus floridanus
              - Sylvilagus robustus
        - - Sylvilagus brasiliensis
          - Sylvilagus dicei
    - - Sylvilagus bachmani
      - Sylvilagus mansuetus
  - Sylvilagus andinus

=== Subspecies ===
Three subspecies of Sylvilagus palustris have been identified:

- Carolina marsh rabbit (Sylvilagus palustris palustris) – nominate subspecies; marsh rabbit of mainland regions from northwest Florida to southeast Virginia.
- Florida marsh rabbit (Sylvilagus palustris paludicola) – found in peninsular Florida down to the upper Florida Keys.
- Lower Keys marsh rabbit (Sylvilagus palustris hefneri) – classified as endangered. Molecular evidence points towards this subspecies potentially being only classified as a group of isolated populations, not a distinct subspecies.

== Description ==
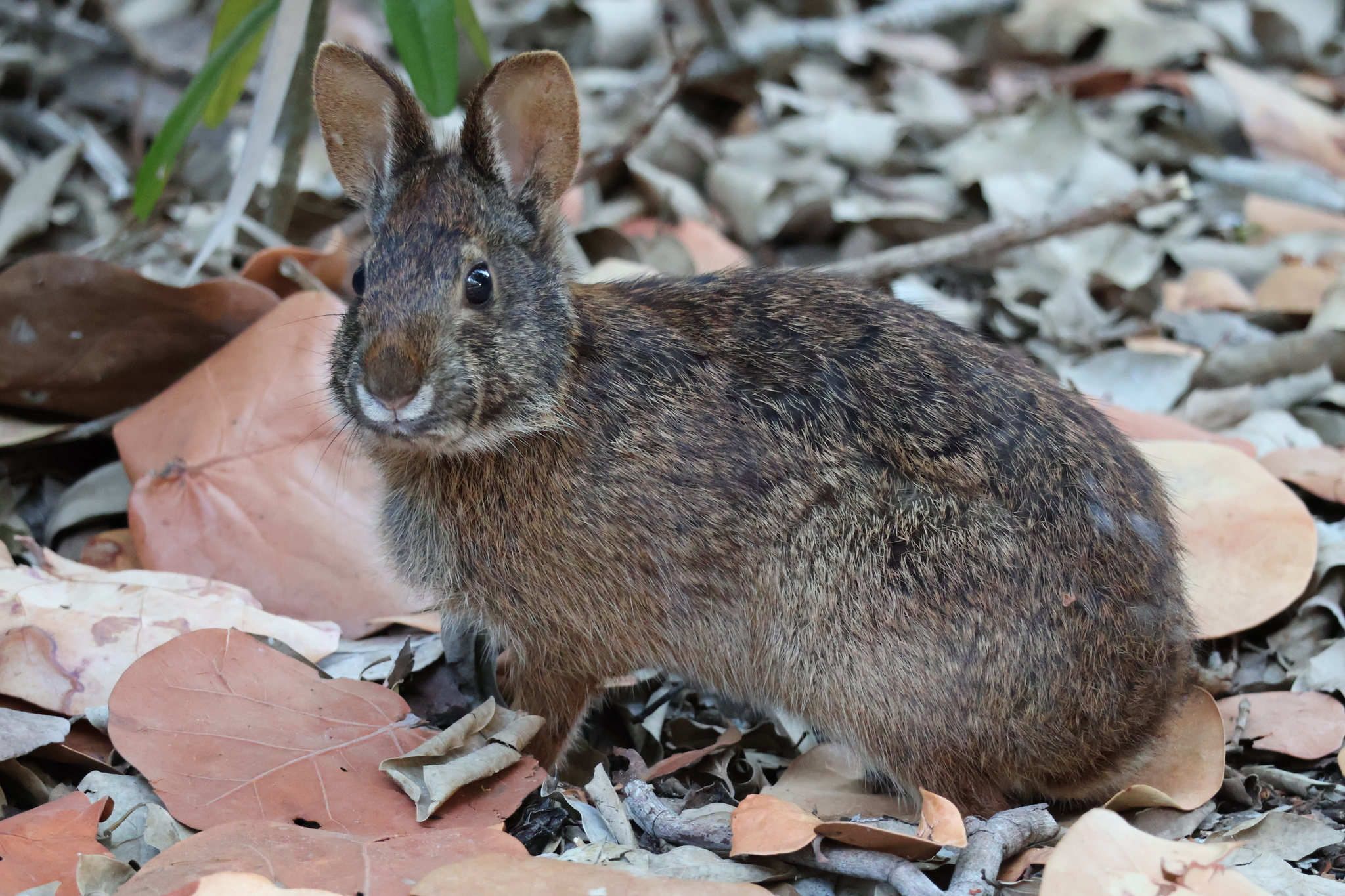
In Bradenton Beach, Florida

Marsh rabbits have blackish brown or dark reddish fur on their back, head, and upper body. The belly is a dingy brownish gray in most cases, but can also have a dull white appearance in mainland rabbits. The leading edges of the ears display small black tufts with ochre on the inside. The rough hair on the rabbit's back may be fringed with black hairs. The black portions of the upper parts often change to a dull grayish buff in spring and summer months, returning to a reddish or ochre color in fall, followed by darker black in the winter. Marsh rabbits of peninsular Florida typically display darker and redder colors with a cinnamon-rufous nape, feet, and legs. Juveniles display much darker and duller colors than adults.

Marsh rabbits are typically smaller than eastern cottontail (Sylvilagus floridanus) rabbits, though they are otherwise similar in their general appearance. Adults from the Florida peninsula weigh approximately 2.2–2.6 pounds (1.00–1.18 kg) with a total length upwards of 17 inches (43 cm). Adults from the mainland regions typically grow larger, weighing up to 3.5 pounds (1.6 kg) and reaching more than 17.5 inches (44 cm) in length. The hind feet of the average mainland marsh rabbit are also larger, at 3.6 inches (9.1 cm) compared with 3.5 inches (8.9 cm) for the typical specimen of the Florida peninsula. Another feature observed in specimens from southern Florida is melanism. These individuals exhibit completely black phenotypic coloration that does not change seasonally.

The most easily identifiable feature that distinguishes marsh rabbits from swamp rabbits and cottontails is that the underside of the tail is almost never white but more brownish gray. The short ears and legs of a marsh rabbit are much smaller than that of a swamp rabbit. The tail is also much reduced from the bushy tail seen in other cottontails. The front of its skull tapers more quickly than the swamp rabbit as well. Long toenails, used for digging, are found in both the swamp and marsh rabbit, though the marsh rabbit's are 13% longer on average when comparing the two species. The marsh rabbit's dental formula is 2.0.3.31.0.2.3 × 2 = 28—two pairs of upper and one pair of lower incisors, no canines, three upper and two lower premolars on each side, and three upper and lower molars on either side of the jaw.

== Habitat and distribution ==
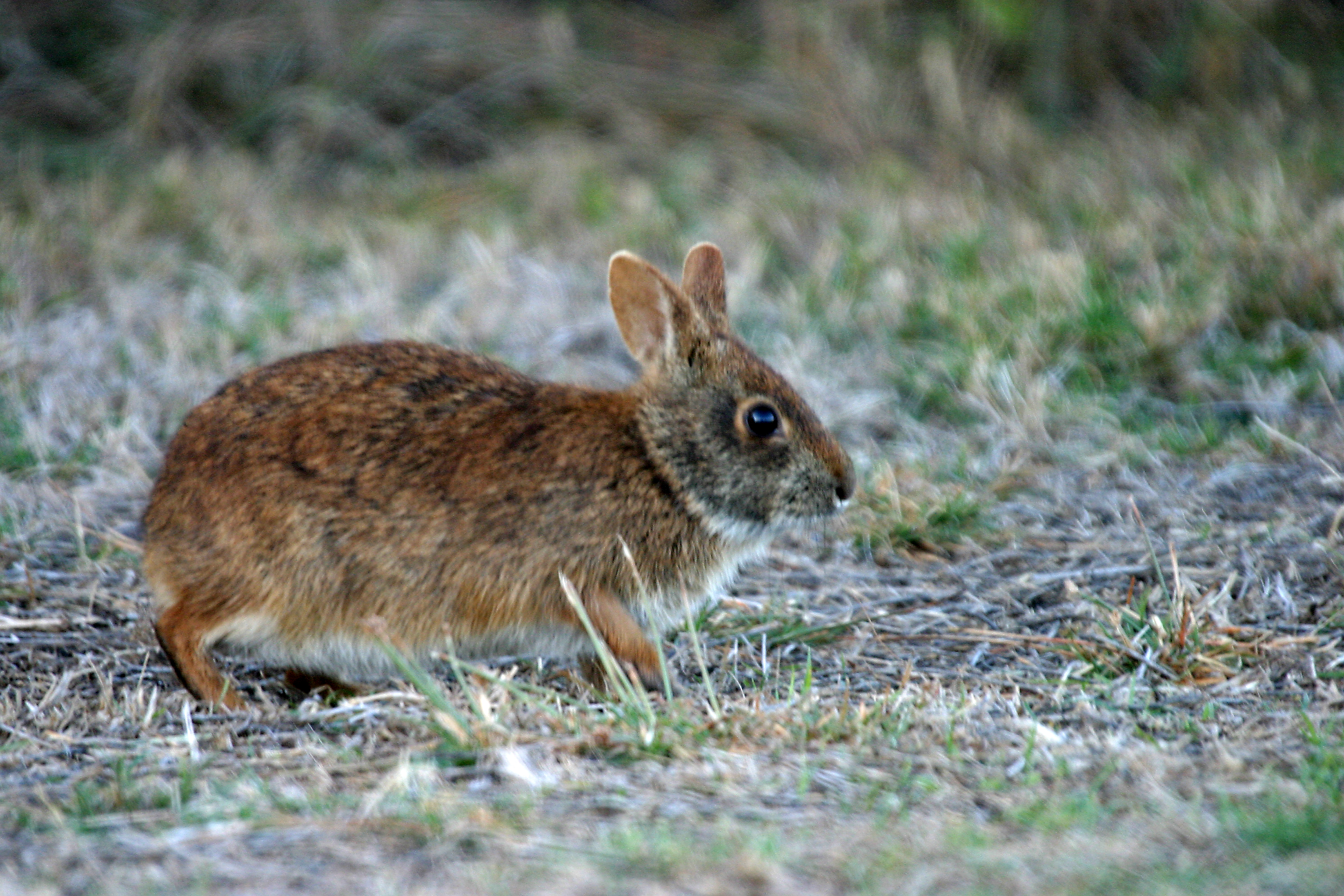
In cattail habitat

The marsh rabbit is found in wet areas of low elevation from southeast Virginia through Florida to the Florida Keys, with populations occurring throughout eastern North and South Carolina, southeast Georgia, and southeast Alabama as well. Each subspecies is found in particular parts of the broader range. The Carolina marsh rabbit (S. p. palustris) ranges from the Dismal Swamp, Virginia, along the eastern coast to northern sections of Florida and through the Gulf Coast into Mobile Bay, Alabama. It occupies coastal lowland areas, swamps, and rivers and is rarely found more than forty miles from the coast. The Florida marsh rabbit (S. p. paludicola) occupies the peninsular region of Florida, from south of the Florida Panhandle to the upper Keys. There is a region north of Miami along the east coast where this subspecies is not found. The endangered Lower Keys marsh rabbit (S. p. hefneri) is only found in the southern Florida Keys.

The marsh rabbit commonly inhabits brackish and freshwater marshes, mainly of cattails and cypress. In southern Florida, they commonly occupy sandy islands and mangrove swamps. They are strictly limited to regions with ready access to water, unlike most rabbits. Often, they will enter tidal marshes, but remain near high ground for protection. Normal hiding spots include dense thickets of magnolia, blackgum (Nyssa sylvatica), sweetgum (Liquidambar styraciflua), briers, and cattails.

== Ecology and behavior ==
Feeding in the Everglades

=== Behavior ===
Marsh rabbits are most active nocturnally; they spend most of the daylight hours resting in hidden areas. Frequent hiding spots include dense thickets, hollow logs, and stands of cattails and grasses. They have also been known to take advantage of the abandoned burrows of other animals. During the day, if not using the burrow of another animal, a marsh rabbit will create a depression in the earth among dense vegetation, under thickets, or within tree cavities. This depression is known as a form, and is a place where a rabbit will often return with food and other items (such as the leftover molts of crayfish or plastrons from Florida box turtles) to chew on, though forms from other rabbits may be taken if convenient. They are assisted in the digging of forms and nests through the use of their long toenails. Marsh rabbits frequently make runway trails in dense vegetation along marsh edges. These trails can be identified easily as the rabbits mark active runways with fecal pellets, though pellets are deposited on raised surfaces such as stumps and rocks as well. They may travel up to 5 kilometers (3.1 mi) in a day.

One distinguishing habit of marsh rabbits is that they walk on all fours, placing each foot down alternately like a cat. Although they can hop like all rabbits, they are more agile in dense vegetation with this walking tendency. This smaller gait has been measured at 3.5–6.5 in (8.9–16.5 cm) between steps. Running is also seen in marsh rabbits, where they will scurry along the ground with the head lowered.

Marsh rabbits are more aquatic than swamp rabbits, as they are not known to inhabit forests. They take to water readily and are excellent swimmers. To aid in swimming, the hind legs have less fur and longer nails than typical cottontails. When not concealed in dense thickets, the rabbits will stay submerged in muddy water with only their eyes and noses exposed and ears laid back flat. When they have been spotted, they will readily take to water and swim quickly to a new hiding spot or floating vegetation. Because marsh rabbits possess very short hind legs, they typically rely on doubling back and turning when running to evade predators. This often leads to easy capture by dogs. When flushed out of hiding spots, they may squeal as they escape.

=== Ecology ===
Birds of prey such as the great horned owl and northern harrier are major predators of the marsh rabbit. Other predators include alligators, snakes, bobcats, foxes, and coyotes, but the greatest threats to marsh rabbits come from human activities, which includes fires and dogs. Marsh rabbits are thought to live roughly three to four years in the wild.

Several parasites affect the marsh rabbit, and it may be affected by ticks (particularly the rabbit tick Haemaphysalis leporispalustris), chiggers, and fleas. The marsh rabbit has also been found to be infested with botflies. Internally, trematodes, tapeworms, and nematodes can parasitize marsh rabbits. Diseases of the marsh rabbit are not well studied, but they are capable of contracting tularemia and mange.

=== Reproduction ===
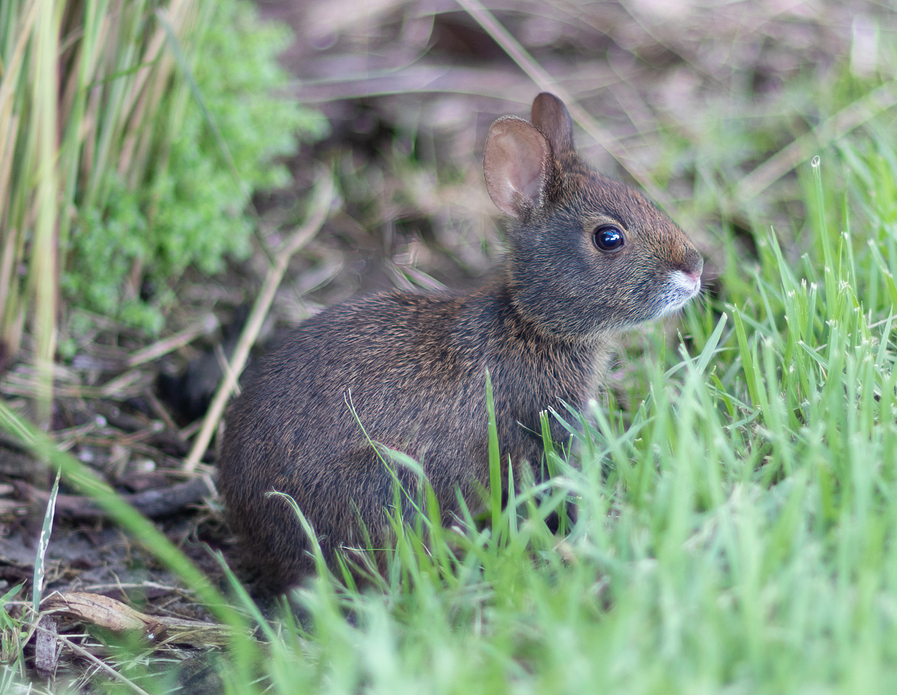
Juvenile in Pinellas, Florida

Breeding in marsh rabbits occurs year-round. Typical brood sizes are 2 to 4 young with a gestation period of 30 to 37 days. Adult females produce up to 7 litters per year with an average production of 3 to 5 young per litter. The female marsh rabbit reaches sexual maturity at 9 months of age, though it is capable of reproductive activity at only 6 months. Nests are built from rushes, grasses, and leaves. The well-covered nest is lined with hair from the adult rabbits. They are often found in dense thickets or swampy places completely surrounded by water for protection. The young are born with their fur well-developed but their eyes closed, and will stay in the nest several days after weaning. They disperse from the range where they were born once they reach 8 to 10 months of age, and males are noted to travel further from the nest than females.

=== Diet ===
Marsh rabbits are strictly herbivorous. Typically, they feed on leaves and bulbs of marsh plants including cattails, brushes, and grasses. They can also feed on other aquatic or marsh plants such as centella, greenbrier, marsh pennywort, water hyacinth, duck potato, and amaryllis, with Centella repanda being especially favored.

Marsh rabbits, like all lagomorphs (hares, rabbits, and pikas), reingest their food in practice known as cecotrophy. In this process, food passes through the digestive tract twice, as the marsh rabbit will immediately consume moist pellets expelled from the anus without chewing and leave behind the dry pellets that are subsequently produced. This process is considered similar to the cud-chewing behavior of ruminants.

== Interaction with humans ==
=== As game and pests ===
In regions of the South, marsh rabbits are regularly hunted along with swamp rabbits by burning large patches of dried grass to flush them out into the open, where they are shot or clubbed. In some states, the marsh rabbit is considered a game animal and is regulated by the Department of Natural Resources. For example, South Carolina establishes a hunting season from November 27 to March 2 with a 5 rabbit per day bag limit. In Virginia, marsh rabbit hunting is managed by the Department of Game and Inland Fisheries.

With their diet of mainly aquatic plants, marsh rabbits are considered minor agricultural pests to most economically viable crops. Marsh rabbits feed on cultivated sweet potato and carrot crops in addition to their typical wild fare. In southern Florida, they are considered major pests of sugar cane fields.

=== Cultural references ===
In Georgia, the marsh rabbit is known as pontoon. In Alabama, swamp rabbits (or cane-cutters) are often mistaken for marsh rabbits. In some regions of the Eastern US where it is served in restaurants, "marsh rabbit" is actually a euphemism for muskrat meat. True marsh rabbit meat is often prepared as a stew, or it may be marinated, covered in flour, and fried.

=== Conservation ===
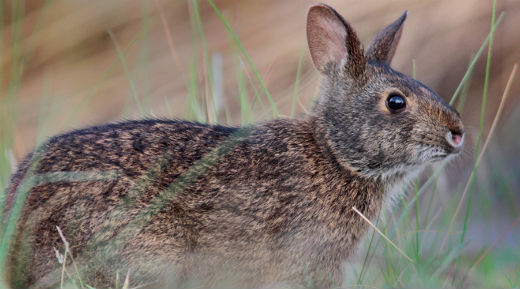
Lower Keys marsh rabbit (S. p. hefneri)

The marsh rabbit as a species is considered "abundant" throughout its range, though the Lower Keys marsh rabbit subspecies is classified as an endangered species, having been listed by the United States Fish and Wildlife Service as such since 1990. This subspecies lost over half of its habitat from the period between 1959 and 2006, with 47% of the total available habitat being lost to sea level rise and 8% of it being taken away by human development of the land. This development has further hindered recovery of the subspecies, as it has blocked off migration towards less flooded areas. In the southern parts of Everglades National Park, marsh rabbits have mostly disappeared due to predation by the Burmese python, an invasive species. Further spread of the Burmese python is a threat to future conservation of the marsh rabbit. Populations in Georgia appear to be declining based on studies of roadkill deaths. As of 2019, the International Union for Conservation of Nature (IUCN) lists the marsh rabbit as a least-concern species.
