= Coastal tapeti =

Conservation status
- Vulnerable (IUCN 3.1)

Scientific classification
- Kingdom: Animalia
- Phylum: Chordata
- Class: Mammalia
- Order: Lagomorpha
- Family: Leporidae
- Genus: Sylvilagus
- Species: S. tapetillus

Binomial name
- Sylvilagus tapetillus Thomas, 1913
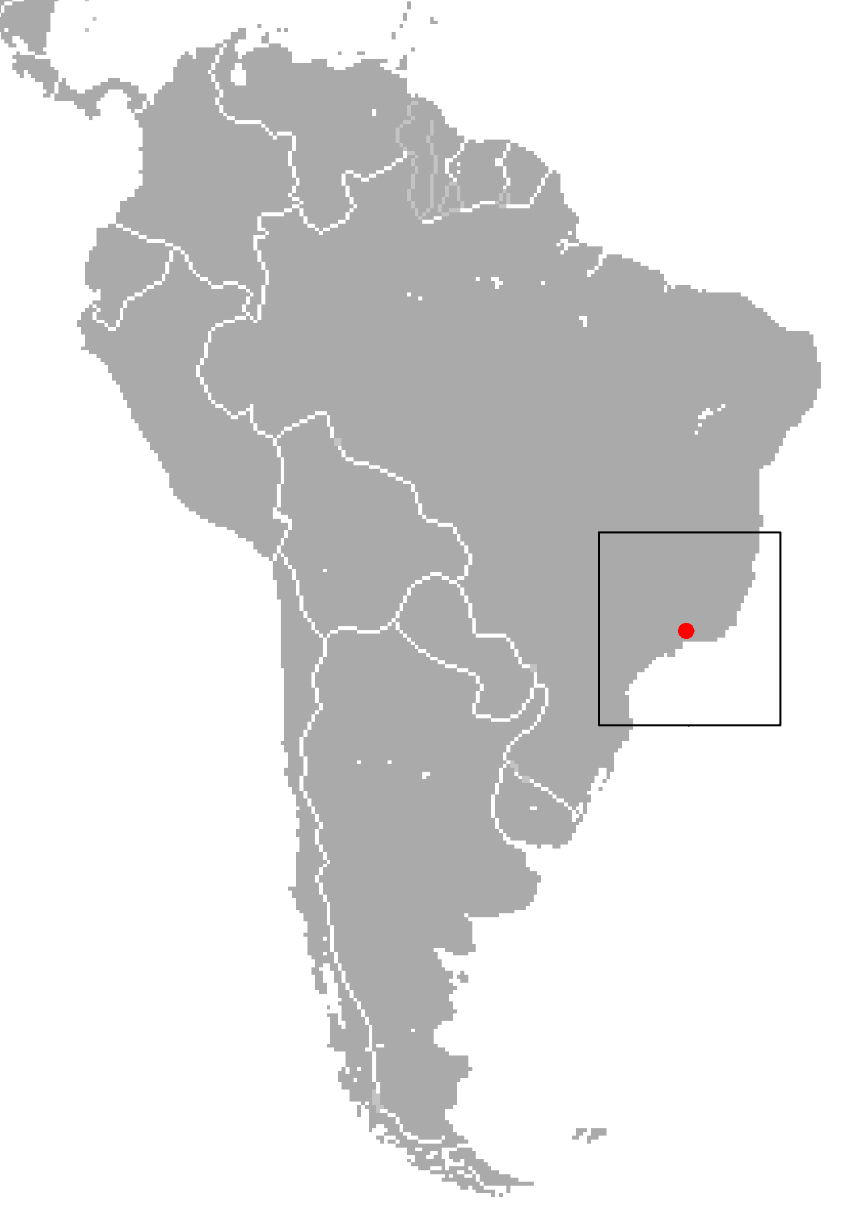

Synonyms
- Sylvilagus brasiliensis tapetillus R. S. Hoffmann & A. T. Smith, 2005

Species of mammal

The coastal tapeti (Sylvilagus tapetillus), also known as the Rio de Janeiro dwarf cottontail or dwarf tapeti, is a species of cottontail rabbit native to Brazil. Known only from three specimens captured in the late nineteenth century in the Paraíba Valley, it was for a long time considered to be a smaller-sized subspecies of the common tapeti. Analysis in 2017 confirmed that it is sufficiently distinct in both appearance and genetics to be considered a species in its own right. Due to urban expansion near its habitat in the densely populated Paraíba Valley of Rio de Janeiro state, it is unclear whether or not the species still survives in the present day.

== Taxonomy ==
The coastal tapeti was first described by Oldfield Thomas in 1913, who was at the time attempting to clarify the different species across the broad distribution of the common tapeti (Sylvilagus brasiliensis), as traditionally defined in 1758 by Carl Linnaeus. The type specimen and species overall was originally described as "extremely small", and this characteristic was used to justify differentiating the species from others in the S. brasiliensis group. Its type locality was noted as "near Rezende, from Porto Real, Rio de Janeiro, Brazil" at an elevation of 1,280 feet (390 m). It is among several species to be clarified as distinct from the common tapeti species complex, alongside the Andean tapeti (S. andinus), the Central American tapeti (S. gabbi), Dice's cottontail (S. dicei), and the Santa Marta tapeti (S. sanctaemartae).

== Description ==
The coastal tapeti is similar to the common tapeti in appearance, though it is slightly smaller. The coastal tapeti's ears are roughly 1 centimetre (0.39 in) smaller than those of the common tapeti, and its fur is a less dark brown. There is an orange patch at the back of the neck, and it is white underneath.

== Distribution and habitat ==
Specimens of the coastal tapeti are only known from one region in the state of Rio de Janeiro, Brazil, that being part of the Paraíba do Sul river valley within Porto Real. The species' habitat includes grasslands sparsely vegetated with Aristida pallens grasses.

== Conservation ==
Based on the coastal tapeti's extremely small range within Porto Real that potentially overlaps with urban housing developments, the species is threatened by human population growth. It has been assessed by the International Union for Conservation of Nature (IUCN) as a vulnerable species. The authors of the IUCN assessment have put forth that there is too little known about the species to classify it as further endangered.

== Notes ==
=== References ===
- Ruedas, Luis A.; Silva, Sofia Marques; French, Johnnie H.; Platt II, Roy Nelson; Salazar-Bravo, Jorge; Mora, Jose M.; Thompson, Cody W. (2017). "A prolegomenon to the systematics of South American cottontail rabbits (Mammalia, Lagomorpha, Leporidae: Sylvilagus): designation of a neotype for S. brasiliensis (Linnaeus, 1758), and restoration of S. andinus (Thomas, 1897) and S. tapetillus Thomas, 1913" (PDF). Miscellaneous Publications. 205. Ann Arbor: Museum of Zoology, University of Michigan. ISSN 0076-8405.
