= Northern tapeti =

Scientific classification
- Kingdom: Animalia
- Phylum: Chordata
- Class: Mammalia
- Order: Lagomorpha
- Family: Leporidae
- Genus: Sylvilagus
- Species: S. incitatus

Binomial name
- Sylvilagus incitatus (O. Bangs, 1901)

Synonyms
- Lepus (Tapeti) incitatus (Bangs, 1901); Sylvilagus gabbi incitatus (Nelson, 1909); Sylvilagus brasilensis incitatus (Hershkovitz, 1950)

Species of mammal

The northern tapeti (Sylvilagus incitatus) is a species of cottontail rabbit related to the Central American tapeti (Sylvilagus gabbi). Its type locality is an island in the Pearl Islands of Panama. Previously it was considered a subspecies of the Central American tapeti, and later of the common tapeti (Sylvilagus brasilensis) from 1950 onwards (though some studies still placed it as a subspecies of S. gabbi), it was split into its own separate species in 2019, with researchers noting its "bizarre dental anatomy".

The northern tapeti is one of two tapeti species other than the common tapeti located north of the Amazon River, with the other being the Santa Marta tapeti.
