= Porto Real =

- Municipality
- Município de Porto Real
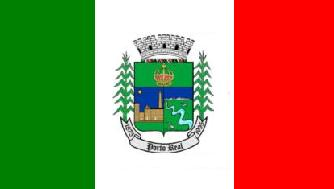
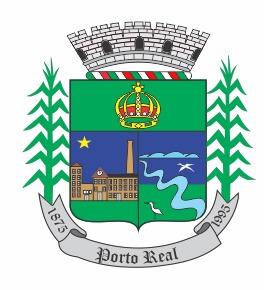
- Flag Coat of arms

- Location of Porto Real in the state of Rio de Janeiro

- Location of Porto Real in Brazil
- Coordinates: 22°25′12″S 44°17′24″W
- Country: Brazil
- Region: Southeast
- State: Rio de Janeiro

Government
  - Prefeito: Jorge Serfiotis (PMDB)

Area
  - Total: 50.892 km^{2} (19.650 sq mi)
- Elevation: 385 m (1,263 ft)

Population (2020)
  - Total: 19,974
- Time zone: UTC−3 (BRT)

Porto Real (Portuguese pronunciation: [ˈpoʁtu ʁeˈaw]) is a municipality located in the Brazilian state of Rio de Janeiro. Its population was 19,974 (2020) and its area is 50.9 km^{2}.

It is the sole location where the coastal tapeti, a species of cottontail rabbit, is known to exist.

== History ==
The land around Porto Real was first given to Captain-Major Garcia Rodrigues Pais Leme by King João V of Portugal in 1715. It was not until 1801 that Pais' descendant built a settlement on the land and named it Resende after the Count of Resende. In 1722, due to an incentive from the Marquess of Lavradio to exempt anyone who had planted a number coffee trees from military service, the Pais Leme family did so and started a coffee industry there. By 1822, a pier was built into the Paraíba River which started to be used regularly by the Emperor of Brazil, Pedro II of Brazil. This led to the town being renamed as Porto Real. From there, the Province of Rio de Janeiro started establishing sugar mills in the town as the coffee industry had started to be less profitable, with the Imperial Brazilian government elevated the town to a Colony, with the aim of bringing in Italian migrants to help work in the sugar industry.

By 1892, it had been relegated back to a district within Resende municipality. In 1995, it was severed from Resende and given its own municipal status. In 2011, a Citroën automobile construction factory had been established within Porto Real with them announcing in 2025 that they would be constructing the Citroën Basalt car at the factory in Porto Real. In 2021, a new bridge over the river was constructed at Porto Real. In 2024, a large drug smuggling ring was discovered in Porto Real with the Brazilian Civil Police arresting people after the drugs were discovered being sent via the Brazilian postal service.
