= Bogota tapeti =

Scientific classification
- Kingdom: Animalia
- Phylum: Chordata
- Class: Mammalia
- Order: Lagomorpha
- Family: Leporidae
- Genus: Sylvilagus
- Species: S. apollinaris

Binomial name
- Sylvilagus apollinaris (O. Thomas, 1920)

Species of mammal

The Bogota tapeti (Sylvilagus apollinaris) is a species of cottontail rabbit related to the common tapeti (Sylvilagus brasilensis). It is endemic to a region south of the Isthmus of Panama, generally described as "northern Colombia". Previously a subspecies of either the common tapeti or Andean tapeti (Sylvilagus andinus), it was split and considered a separate species in 2017. Later morphological evidence was examined that supported its separation from S. brasilensis.
