= Sylvilagus leonensis =

Sylvilagus leonensis Temporal range: Late Pleistocene

Scientific classification
- Domain: Eukaryota
- Kingdom: Animalia
- Phylum: Chordata
- Class: Mammalia
- Order: Lagomorpha
- Family: Leporidae
- Genus: Sylvilagus
- Species: †S. leonensis

Binomial name
- †Sylvilagus leonensis (Cushing, 1945)

Extinct species of rabbit

Sylvilagus leonensis, the dwarf cottontail, is an extinct species of rabbit from the Late Pleistocene, known from the San Josecito Cave in Nuevo Leon, Mexico.

The dwarf cottontail was smaller than living cottontail species, comparable in size to the living pygmy rabbit.
