= Suriname tapeti =

Scientific classification
- Domain: Eukaryota
- Kingdom: Animalia
- Phylum: Chordata
- Class: Mammalia
- Order: Lagomorpha
- Family: Leporidae
- Genus: Sylvilagus
- Species: S. parentum

Binomial name
- Sylvilagus parentum Ruedas, 2017
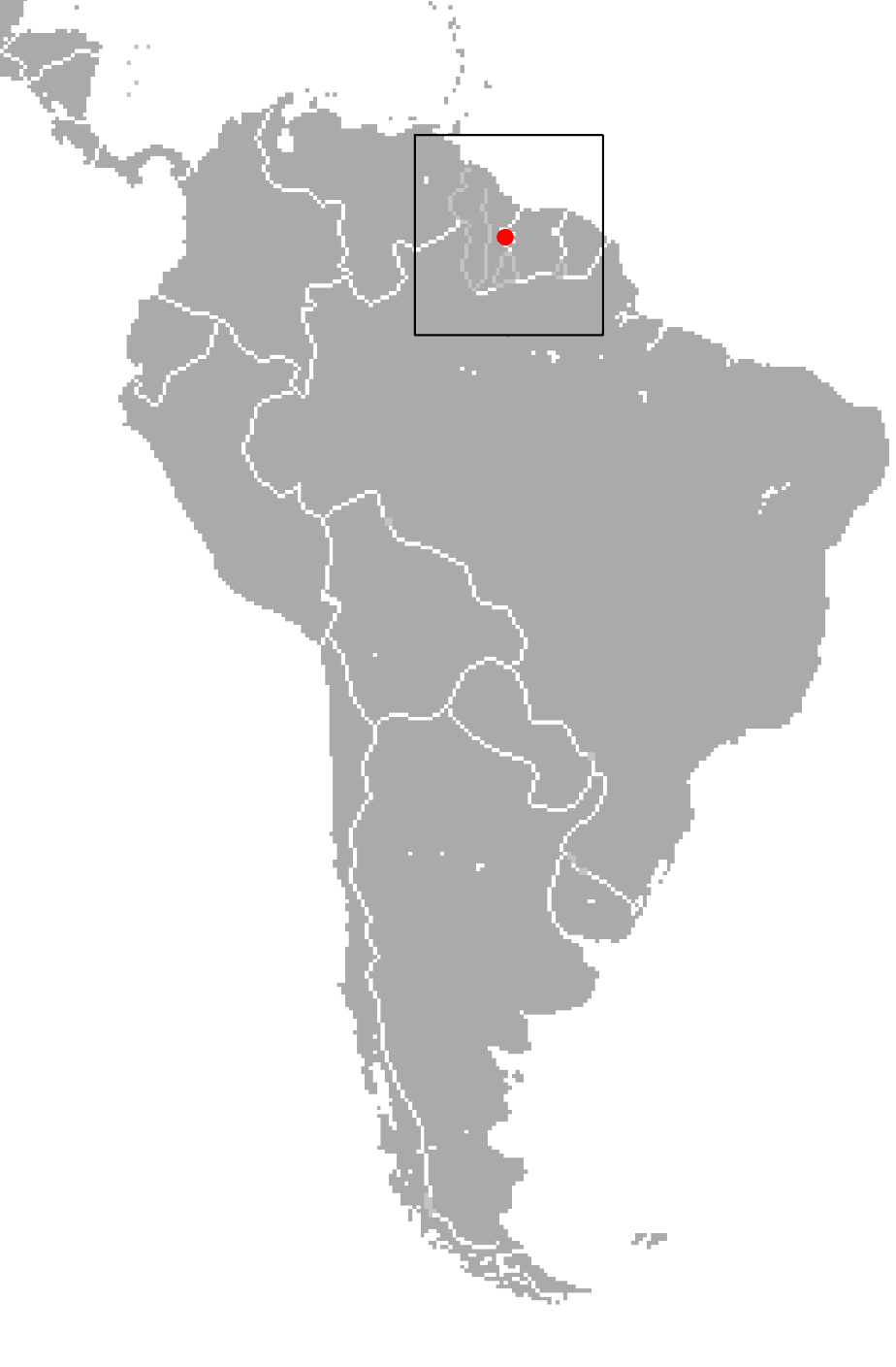

Species of rabbit

The Suriname tapeti (Sylvilagus parentum) or Suriname lowland forest cottontail is a South American species of cottontail rabbit described in 2017. It is known from the lowlands of western Suriname, and was described from specimens collected by Dutch scientists in the 1980s. Its size is relatively large for a South American cottontail rabbit. The rabbit is likely already threatened due to environmental degradation in the region, and its discovery could boost conservation efforts in the area. It was discovered by Portland State University professor Luis Ruedas.

It was reportedly spotted in Karaudarnau, Guyana in 2023.
