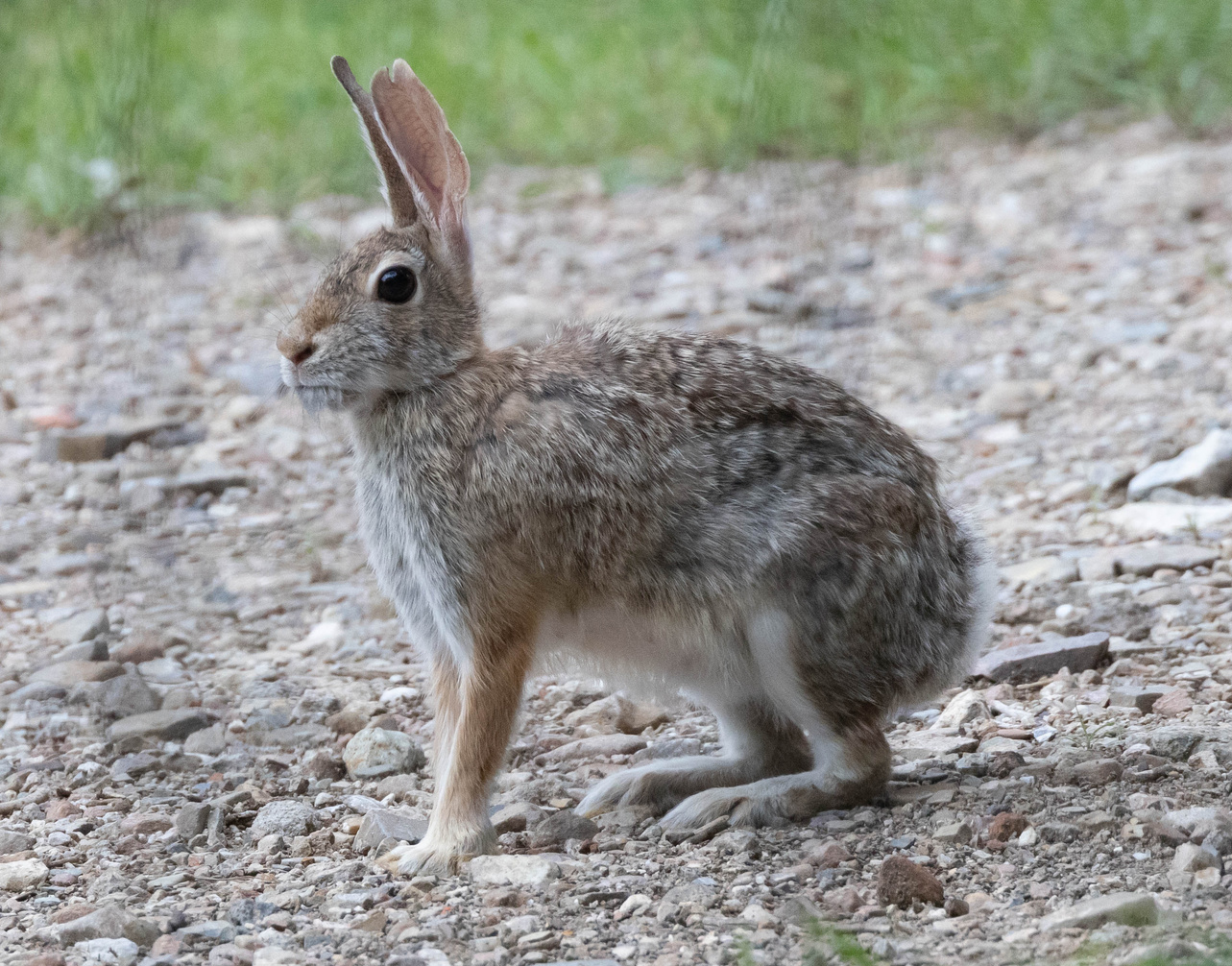
- S. holzneri in the Chiricahua Mountains

Conservation status
- Vulnerable (IUCN 3.1) (subspecies robustus only)

Scientific classification
- Kingdom: Animalia
- Phylum: Chordata
- Class: Mammalia
- Order: Lagomorpha
- Family: Leporidae
- Genus: Sylvilagus
- Species: S. holzneri

Binomial name
- Sylvilagus holzneri (Mearns, 1896)

Subspecies
- S. h. robustus (Bailey, 1905); S. h. holzneri (Mearns, 1896); S. h. hesperius Hoffmeister and Lee, 1963
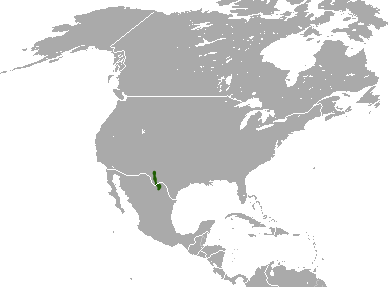
- Range of subspecies S. h. robustus

Synonyms
- Sylvilagus cognatus Nelson, 1907

= Robust cottontail =

Species of mammal

The Davis Mountains cottontail, robust cottontail or Holzner's cottontail (Sylvilagus holzneri) is a species of cottontail rabbit native to high-altitude regions of the southwestern United States and western Mexico.

== Taxonomy ==
This species and the subspecies comprising it were long considered to be subspecies of the eastern cottontail (S. floridanus), but were promoted to species level due to morphological analysis. Genetic data have confirmed the uniqueness of S. holzneri. S. holzneri and S. floridanus are distinguished primarily by size, dental, and cranial differences.

=== Subspecies ===
According to genetic analysis, there are three subspecies of S. holzneri:

- S. h. hesperius: endemic to northwestern and central Arizona, from the Hualapai Mountains south to the Sierra Ancha.
- S. h. holzneri: The most widespread subspecies, ranging throughout mountains from southeastern Arizona and south-central New Mexico (aside from the Guadalupe Mountains) south through Mexico along the Sierra Madre Occidental to Sinaloa.
- S. h. robustus or Davis Mountains cottontail: historically, this subspecies was known to be endemic to four mountain ranges. In Texas, it was known in the Guadalupe Mountains, Davis Mountains and Chisos Mountains. In New Mexico it was also known from the Guadalupe Mountains. In Coahuila, Mexico, it is known from the Sierra Madre Oriental mountain range. The Chisos and Guadalupe Mountains populations are suspected to be extirpated. It is considered Vulnerable on the IUCN Red List.

All three of these were previously considered subspecies of S. floridanus. One (robustus) was already resurrected as a distinct species in 1998, and was considered as such until being reclassified as a subspecies of the newly-resurrected holzneri in 2021, with the common name "robust cottontail" carrying over to holzneri.

=== "Manzano Mountain cottontail" ===
The Manzano Mountain cottontail (S. cognatus) was a species of Sylvilagus also previously classified in S. floridanus, until it was later reclassified as a distinct species. This species was thought to be restricted to the Manzano Mountains in New Mexico, where it occurs in coniferous forests in high elevation, and was classified as Endangered by the IUCN Red List. However, a 2021 phylogenetic analysis found S. cognatus to be indistinguishable from S. h. holzneri and synonymized it with holzneri. This classification was followed by the American Society of Mammalogists.

== Description ==
S. holzneri typically averages a total length of 42 cm (17 in), and weighs between 1.3 and 1.8 kg (2.9 and 4.0 lb). It is restricted to dry, brushy, mountains at elevations above 1,500 metres (4,920 ft).

== Conservation ==
Despite the rarity of S. h. robustus, currently no governmental agency provides protection or listing for this subspecies.
