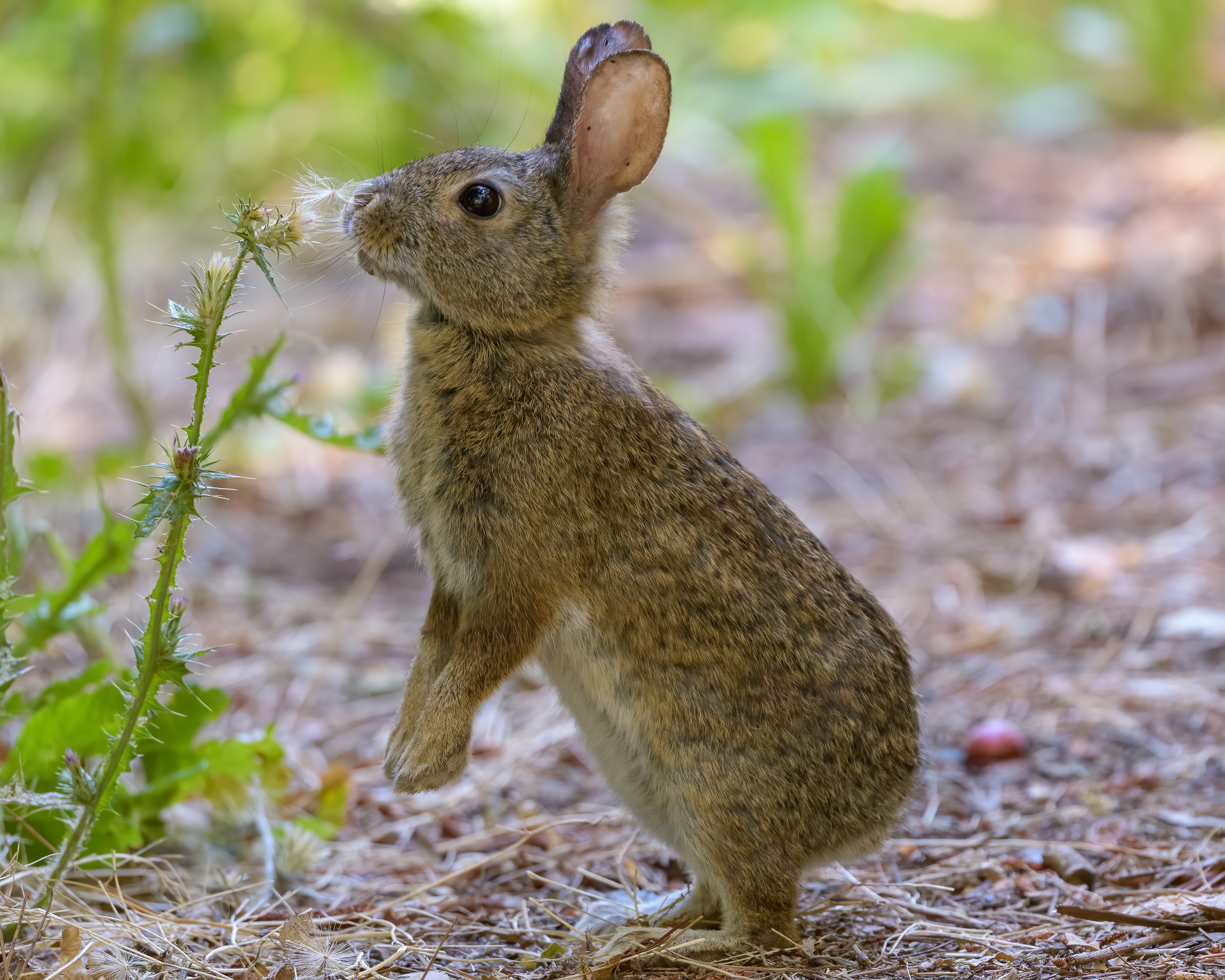
- Brush rabbit (S. bachmani)

Scientific classification
- Kingdom: Animalia
- Phylum: Chordata
- Class: Mammalia
- Order: Lagomorpha
- Family: Leporidae
- Genus: Sylvilagus; J.E. Gray, 1867

Type species
- Lepus sylvaticus Bachman, 1837 (=Lepus sylvaticus floridanus J. A. Allen, 1890)

Species
- 27, see text
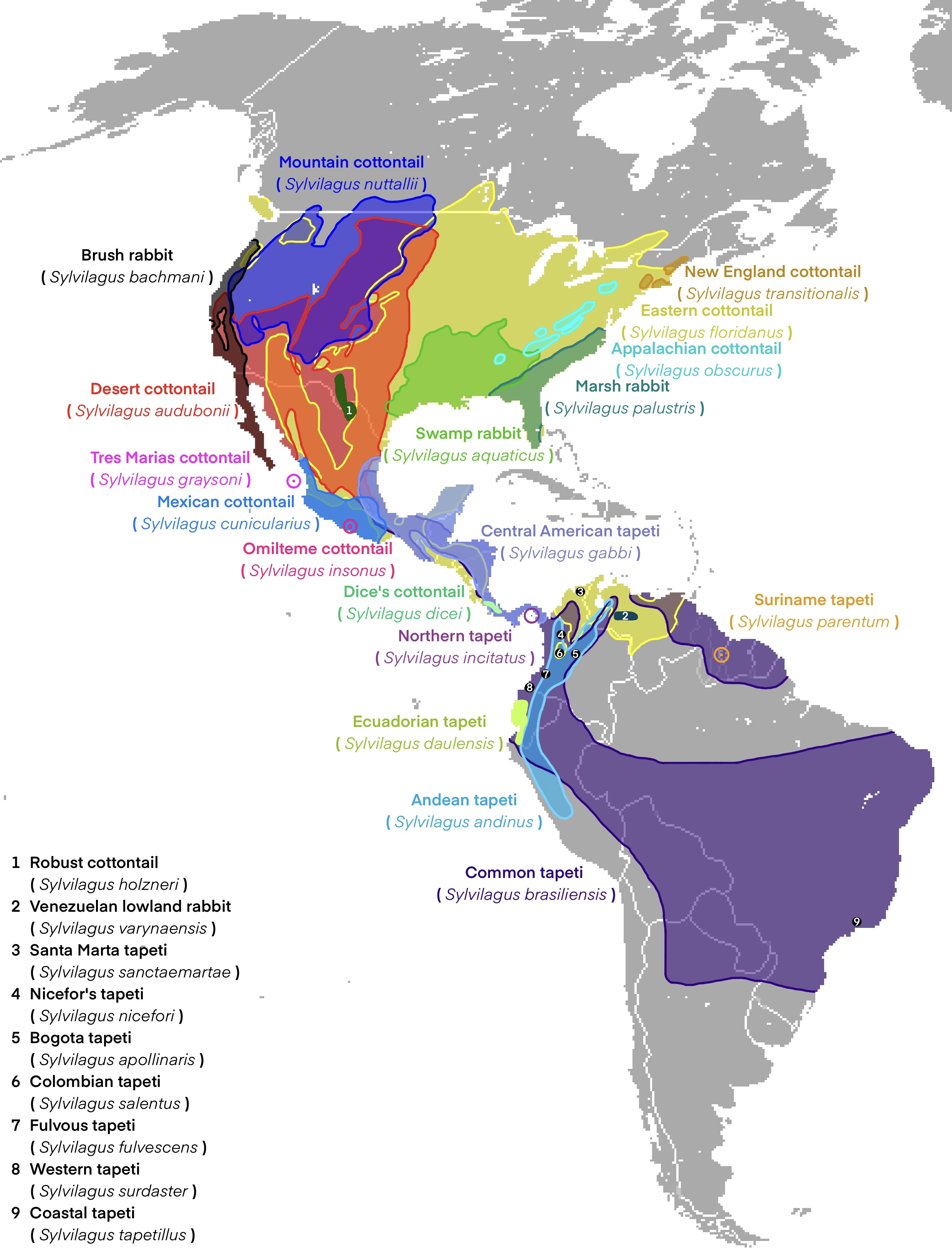
- Distribution of the various cottontail species as of 2024

= Cottontail rabbit =

Cottontail rabbits

Genus of mammals

Cottontail rabbits comprise the genus Sylvilagus, which is in the family Leporidae. They are found in the Americas. Most Sylvilagus species have stub tails with white undersides that show when they retreat, giving them their characteristic name, but this feature is not present in all Sylvilagus species, nor is it unique to the genus. Their fur ranges from brown to gray and changes throughout the year, depending on the season.

The genus is widely distributed across North America, Central America, and northern and central South America, though most species are confined to particular regions. Most species live in nests called forms, and all have altricial young. They often live on the edges of fields, farms, and other open spaces far from highly populated areas, but sometimes they make their nests in yards and parks near more people. An adult female averages three litters per year, which can be born in any season. Occurrence and litter size depend on several factors, including time of the year, weather, and location. The average litter size is four, but can range from as few as two to as many as eight, most of which do not survive to adulthood. Females can begin reproducing when they are only six months old.

Cottontail rabbits show a greater resistance to myxomatosis than European rabbits.

== Etymology ==
The generic name Sylvilagus is derived from the Latin sylva, 'woods', and lagus, 'hare', together meaning "hare of the woods".

== Evolution ==
Cottontail rabbits make up all of the species within the genus Sylvilagus. Their closest relative is Brachylagus, the pygmy rabbit. They are more distantly related to the European and other rabbits, and more distantly still to the hares. The cladogram is based on nuclear and mitochondrial gene analysis.

- Cottontails
  - - - - - - - Sylvilagus audubonii
              - Sylvilagus nuttallii
            - - Sylvilagus aquaticus
              - Sylvilagus palustris
          - - - Sylvilagus transitionalis
              - Sylvilagus obscurus
            - - Sylvilagus floridanus
              - Sylvilagus robustus
        - - Sylvilagus brasiliensis
          - Sylvilagus dicei
    - - Sylvilagus bachmani
      - Sylvilagus mansuetus
  - Sylvilagus andinus

== Lifespan ==
The lifespan of a cottontail averages about two years, depending on the location. Almost every living carnivorous creature comparable to or larger in size than these lagomorphs is a potential predator, including such diverse creatures as domestic dogs, cats, humans, snakes, coyotes, mountain lions, foxes, and, if the cottontail is showing signs of illness, even squirrels. The cottontail's most frequent predators are various birds of prey. They can also be parasitized by botfly species, including Cuterebra fontinella. Newborns are particularly vulnerable to these attacks. Cottontails use burrows vacated by other animals, and the burrows are used for long enough periods that predators can learn where they reside and repeatedly return to prey on them. Though cottontails are prolific animals that can have multiple litters in a year, few of the resulting offspring survive to adulthood. Those that do survive grow very quickly and are full-grown adults at three months.

== Behavior ==
In contrast to rodents, which generally sit on their hind legs and hold food with their front paws while feeding, cottontail rabbits eat while on all fours. These rabbits typically use their noses only to move and adjust the position of the food that they place directly in front of their front paws on the ground. The cottontail turns the food with its nose to find the cleanest part of the vegetation (free of sand and inedible parts) to begin its meal. The only time a cottontail uses its front paws while feeding is when vegetation is above its head on a living plant, when it lifts its paw to bend the branch to bring the food within reach.

Cottontails are rarely found foraging for food on windy days, because the wind interferes with their hearing capabilities. Hearing incoming predators before they get close enough to attack is their primary defense mechanism.

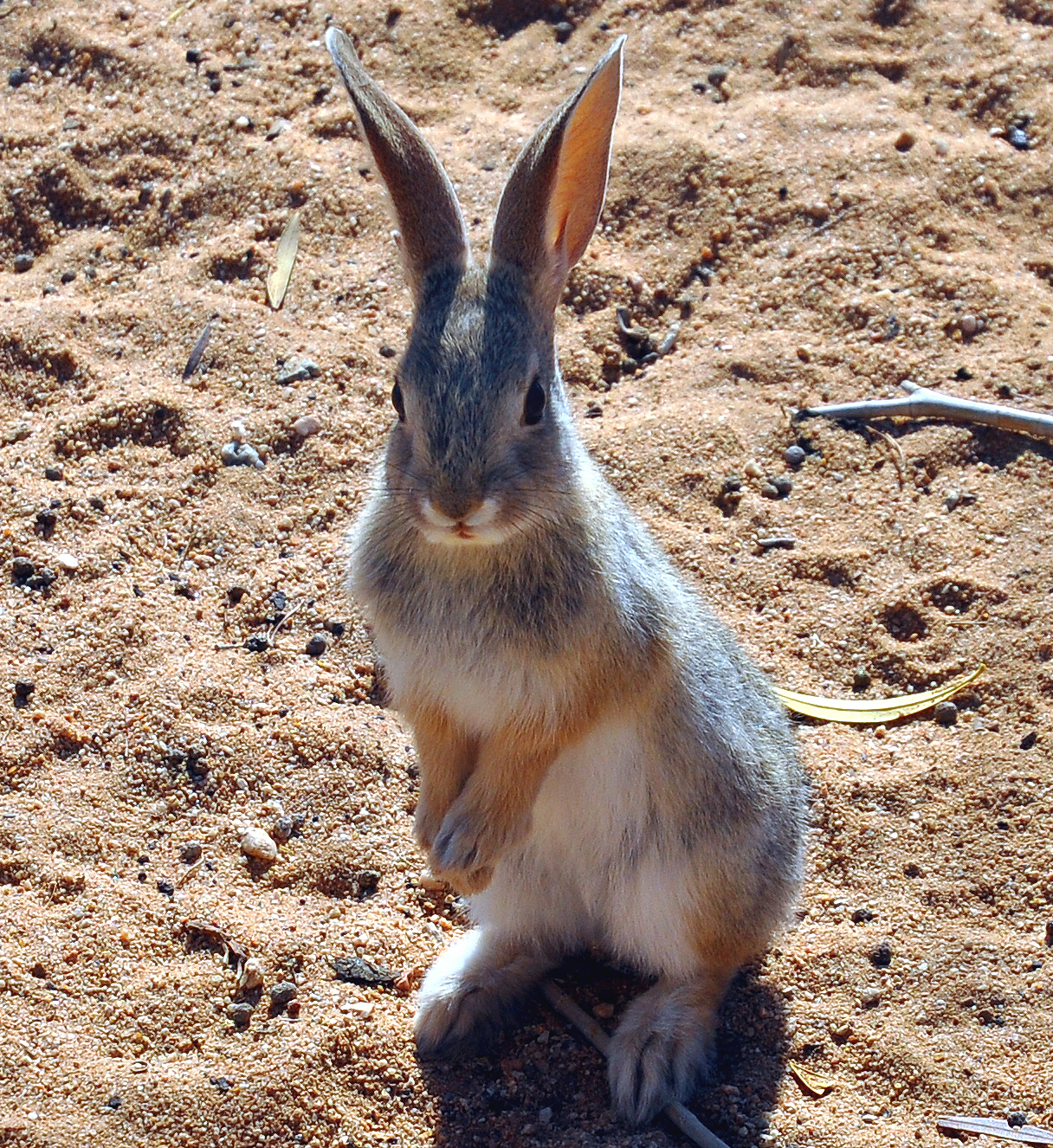
Juvenile cottontail standing in anticipation of food

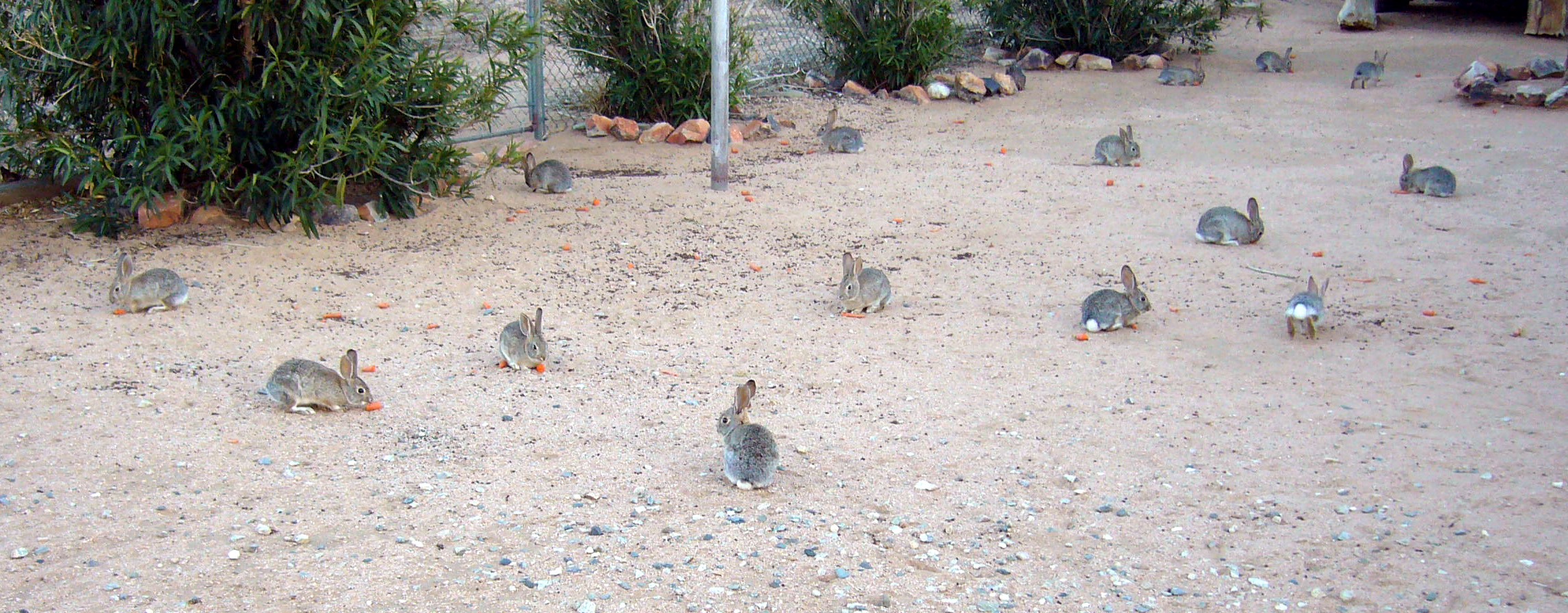
Cottontails are very sociable animals within their peer group.

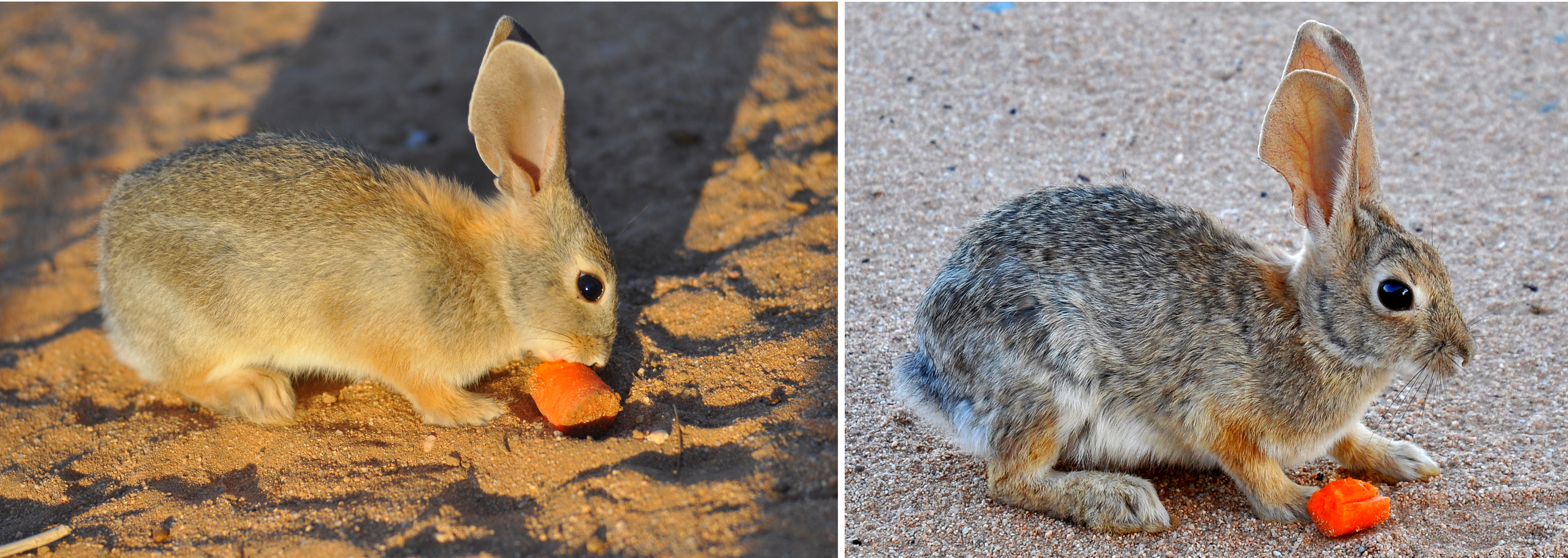
Male desert cottontail at 8 weeks, and the same cottontail at 16 months of age

== Species ==
The subgenera were described in the 19th century based on limited morphological data that have been shown to not be of great use, nor to depict phylogenetic relationships. Molecular studies (limited in scope to the mitochondrial 12S gene) have shown that the currently accepted subgeneric structure, while of some heuristic value, is unlikely to withstand additional scrutiny.

Subgenus	Image	Common name	Scientific name	Distribution
Microlagus		Brush rabbit	Sylvilagus bachmani	West Coast of North America, from the Columbia River in Oregon to the southern tip of the Baja California Peninsula; isolated subspecies, San Jose brush rabbit, on San José Island in the Gulf of California
Sylvilagus		Desert cottontail	Sylvilagus audubonii	Western United States from eastern Montana to West Texas, California, and in Northern and Central Mexico
Sylvilagus		Mexican cottontail	Sylvilagus cunicularius	Mexico from the state of Sinaloa to Oaxaca and Veracruz
Sylvilagus		Eastern cottontail	Sylvilagus floridanus	Eastern and south-central United States, southern Canada, eastern Mexico, Central America and northernmost South America
Sylvilagus		Tres Marias cottontail	Sylvilagus graysoni	Tres Marias Islands, Mexico
Sylvilagus		Mountain cottontail	Sylvilagus nuttallii	Intermountain west of Canada and the United States
Sylvilagus		Appalachian cottontail or Allegheny cottontail	Sylvilagus obscurus	Eastern United States
Sylvilagus		Robust cottontail	Sylvilagus holzneri	Southwestern United States and adjacent Mexico
Sylvilagus		New England cottontail	Sylvilagus transitionalis	New England, specifically from southern Maine to southern New York
Tapeti		Andean tapeti	Sylvilagus andinus	Venezuela south to Peru
Tapeti		Bogota tapeti	Sylvilagus apollinaris	Colombia
Tapeti		Swamp rabbit	Sylvilagus aquaticus	Southern United States
Tapeti		Common tapeti	Sylvilagus brasiliensis	Brazil (Venezuela to Argentina when the many unclassified populations are included)
Tapeti		Ecuadorian tapeti	Sylvilagus daulensis	Ecuador
Tapeti		Dice's cottontail	Sylvilagus dicei	Costa Rica and Panama
Tapeti		Fulvous tapeti	Sylvilagus fulvescens	Colombia
Tapeti		Central American tapeti	Sylvilagus gabbi	Mexico to Panama
Tapeti		Northern tapeti	Sylvilagus incitatus	San Miguel Island, Panama
Tapeti		Omilteme cottontail	Sylvilagus insonus	Guerrero, Mexico
Tapeti		Nicefor's tapeti	Sylvilagus nicefori	Colombia
Tapeti		Marsh rabbit	Sylvilagus palustris	Southeastern United States
Tapeti		Suriname tapeti	Sylvilagus parentum	Western Suriname
Tapeti		Colombian tapeti	Sylvilagus salentus	Colombia
Tapeti		Santa Marta tapeti	Sylvilagus sanctaemartae	Colombia
Tapeti		Western tapeti	Sylvilagus surdaster	Ecuador
Tapeti		Coastal tapeti	Sylvilagus tapetillus	Rio de Janeiro, Brazil
Tapeti		Venezuelan lowland rabbit	Sylvilagus varynaensis	Western Venezuela

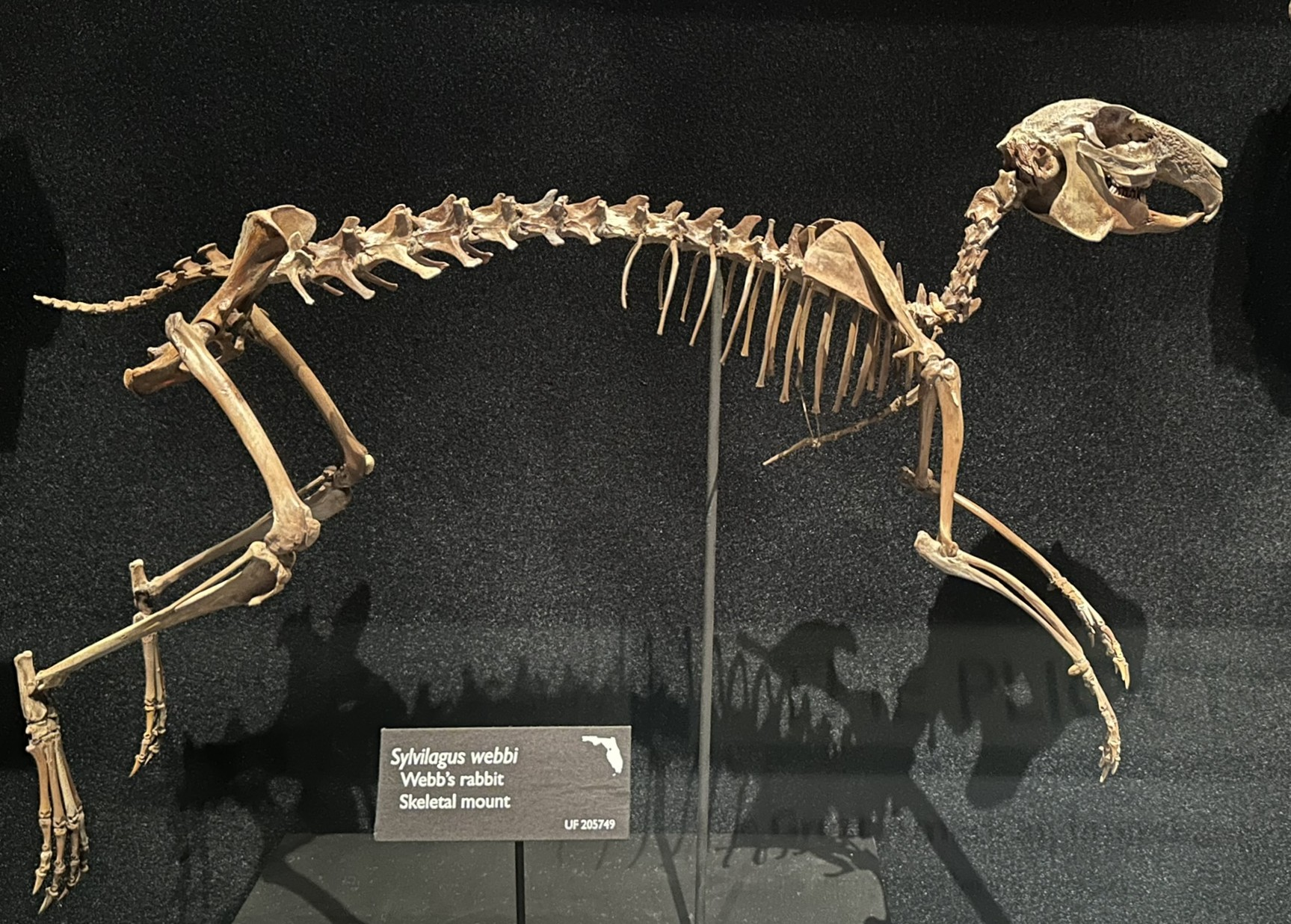
Fossil skeleton of the extinct Early Pleistocene-aged Sylvilagus webbi, Florida Museum of Natural History

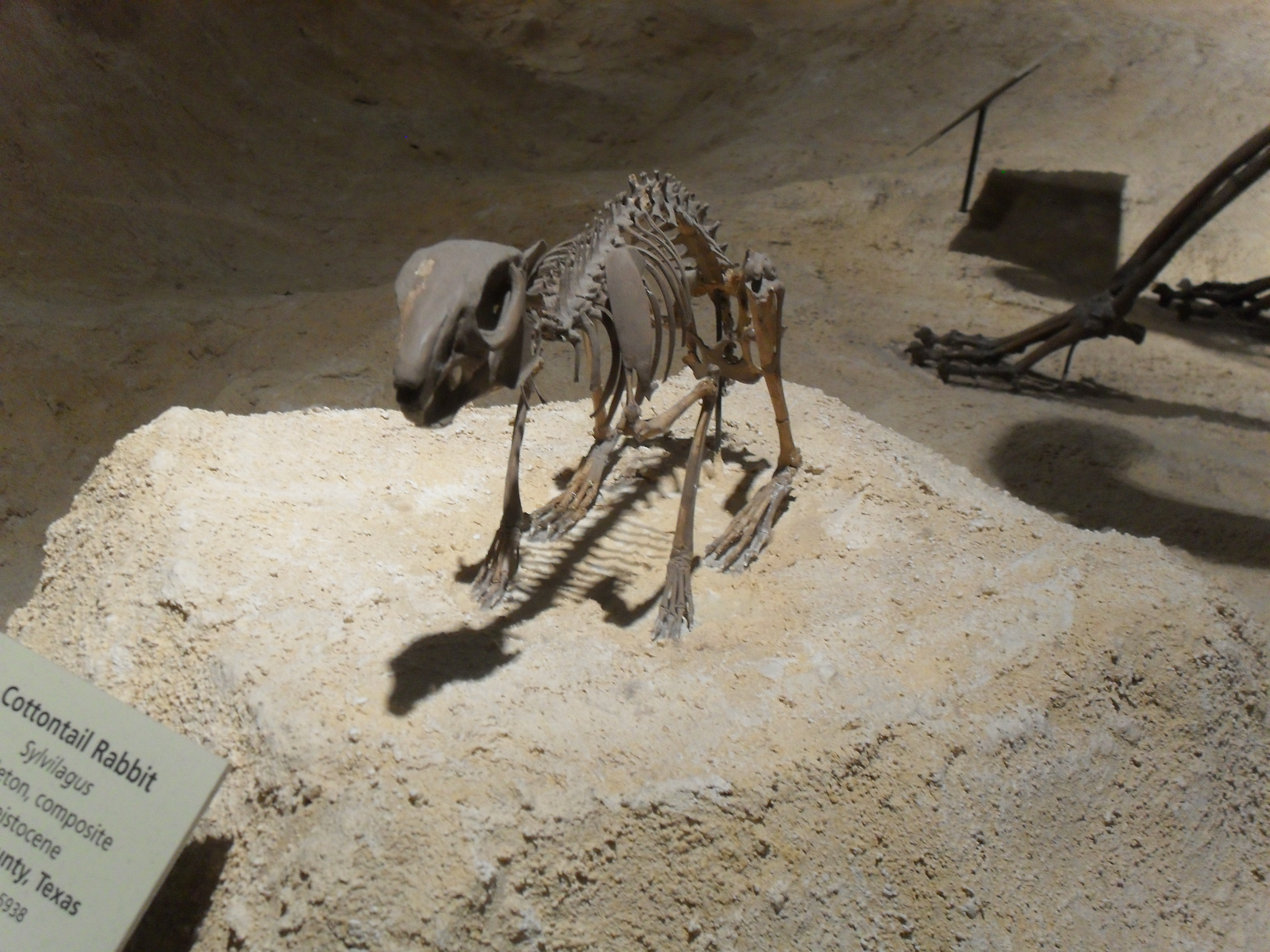
Pleistocene fossil

=== Prehistoric species ===
- Sylvilagus hibbardi (early- to mid-Pleistocene)
- Sylvilagus leonensis - dwarf cottontail (late Pleistocene)
- Sylvilagus webbi] (Pleistocene)
