= Dice's cottontail =

- Limón Province, Costa Rica

Conservation status
- Vulnerable (IUCN 3.1)

Scientific classification
- Kingdom: Animalia
- Phylum: Chordata
- Class: Mammalia
- Order: Lagomorpha
- Family: Leporidae
- Genus: Sylvilagus
- Species: S. dicei

Binomial name
- Sylvilagus dicei Harris, 1932
- Dice's cottontail range

Species of mammal

Dice's cottontail (Sylvilagus dicei) is a species of cottontail rabbit that is native to the Cordillera de Talamanca mountain range in Costa Rica and Panama. It is a large cottontail rabbit with black and brown fur, dull white undersides, a brown patch of fur on its throat and a small, barely visible black tail. It is found at elevations up to 3,800 metres (12,500 ft) and resides in páramo grasslands and cloud forest habitats.

This cottontail is closely related to the common tapeti, a widespread South American rabbit it was once thought to be a subspecies of. The Central American tapeti, a similar-looking rabbit species, is also closely related to Dice's cottontail. Bamboo is a staple of the cottontail's diet, which includes grasses and other leafy vegetation. Its main predators are carnivores, including coyotes and tayras. Increased urbanization and agricultural developments have degraded lowland habitats, leading Dice's cottontail to be forced to higher elevations. The International Union for Conservation of Nature considers it to be a vulnerable species, and Costa Rica has banned hunting of the animal since 2012.

== Taxonomy and phylogeny ==
Dice's cottontail was first described by American zoologist William Pickett Harris Jr. in 1932. He described a specimen that was found at an elevation of 6,000 feet (1,800 m) from the type locality of El Copey de Dota in the Cordillera de Talamanca, Costa Rica, and noted that it was the largest known species within the group of forest rabbits related to the Central American tapeti (Sylvilagus gabbi). Mammalogist George Gilbert Goodwin listed the species in his 1946 work Mammals of Costa Rica, where he called the species the "greater Costa Rican forest hare".

Dice's cottontail was considered to be a subspecies of the common tapeti (Sylvilagus brasiliensis) up until 1981, when the taxonomy of S. brasiliensis was revised by Victor E. Diersing to recognize S. dicei as a distinct species. This placement of S. dicei was reinforced by a 2020 study of the species' molecular genetics, specifically its cytochrome b and 12S rRNA in the mitochondrial loci. This study placed Dice's cottontail as being basal (or more ancestral) to S. brasiliensis, and also noted the Central American tapeti (Sylvilagus gabbi) as its sister taxon. Some populations in Braulio Carrillo National Park are thought to belong to another species, despite previously being assigned to S. dicei. Dice's cottontail has no known fossils and no subspecies. It is speculated to have arisen due to ecological factors driving populations with preferences for different vegetation types to diverge into different species. The genus Dice's cottontail belongs to, Sylvilagus, first appeared roughly 4.4 million years ago, but no time estimate is known for this species' appearance.

== Description ==
Dice's cottontail is one of the larger cottontail rabbits, having an adult head-body length that ranges from 39 to 45 centimetres (15 to 18 in). The tail is black, though it is so small as to be hardly visible, measuring roughly 3 cm (1.2 in) at maximum. The ears measure roughly 5 cm (2.0 in) in length, and its hind feet are 9 to 10 cm (3.5 to 3.9 in) long. Its back is dappled black and brown and its flanks are greyish-black. The underparts are dull white. It has a brown patch on its throat.

Like other leporids, it has a dental formula of 2.0.3.31.0.2.3 × 2 = 28—two pairs of upper and one pair of lower incisors, no canines, three upper and two lower premolars on each side, and three upper and lower molars on either side of the jaw. It is noted as having a larger skull with a less arched nose than that of the Central American tapeti, which is similar in general appearance but has lighter fur and is smaller overall compared to Dice's cottontail.

== Distribution and habitat ==
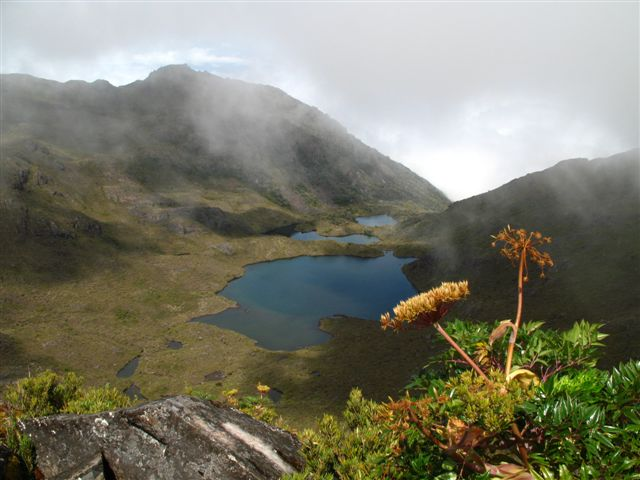
Páramo grassland habitat in Cerro Chirripó, an area inhabited by Dice's cottontail

Dice's cottontail is endemic to the Cordillera de Talamanca mountain range, which straddles the border between Panama and Costa Rica. Its habitat is Alpine meadows and Páramo grasslands above the tree line. It also occurs in the oak-dominated cloud forests and high-elevation shrublands at an altitude of up to 3,800 metres (12,500 ft) in Cerro Chirripó. There exist some records of the cottontail living in areas of lower elevation, as low as 1,180 m (3,870 ft) in Panama and 1,075 m (3,527 ft) in Costa Rica (Heredia Province).

== Behavior and ecology ==
Dice's cottontail is most active during twilight and night times, and spends much of its time resting in forms, shallow depressions in the earth concealed under logs and underbrush. The rabbit mainly feeds at night. It will readily take to water, as it is an able swimmer. When it is available at high altitudes, the cottontail will feed on bamboo (Swallenochloa subtessellata), the shoots of which are often exposed after fires. Other common food items are grasses and leafy vegetation found in clearings and along the edges of roads. Dice's cottontail will mark frequent feeding areas by leaving piles of its fecal pellets, a behavior seen in other cottontail rabbits. Though young of the species have only been found in the period between September and April, it is thought to breed year-round.

Like all lagomorphs (rabbits, hares, and pikas), Dice's cottontail performs cecotrophy to get more nutrition from its food. In this process, food passes through the digestive tract twice, as the cottontail will immediately consume moist pellets expelled from the anus without chewing and leave behind the dry pellets that are subsequently produced. This process is considered similar to the cud-chewing behavior of ruminants.

Coyotes, tayras and other carnivores commonly prey upon Dice's cottontail. When aware of or trying to escape from predators, the rabbit will make use of its tail. The white underside is only visible when the rabbit is in motion, and hidden when it is stationary. The flash of white both sends signals to nearby individuals and confuses a potential predator.

== Status ==
Prior to 1990, little was known about Dice's cottontail, and surveys had not been conducted to evaluate its conservation status. The International Union for Conservation of Nature (IUCN) first listed the cottontail as insufficiently known in 1994 on its Red List of Endangered Species and as endangered in 1996. This changed to data deficient in 2008, with authors Smith and Boyer citing a need for research on potential threats to the species. A 2024 study on the species' behavior identified further potential research that could be done on seasonal changes to the cottontail's behavior. Currently, Dice's cottontail is considered a vulnerable species by the IUCN, and its numbers are decreasing.

Several factors are known to threaten populations of Dice's cottontail, with predation from invasive coyotes being a major issue. Hunting of the cottontail still occurs as of 2020, despite it being outlawed in Costa Rica since 2012. Before then, it was regulated as a small game species. Dice's cottontail is commonly found as roadkill along the Inter-American Highway. Degradation of the species' habitat is taking place, as trees are cut down and the land turned to pasture. Fire is also a concern, as regular controlled burns throughout the lower elevations of the Cordillera de Talamanca mountain range remove forage and potential shelter from herbivores like Dice's cottontail. These factors are causing the animal's range to contract upward into the mountains, which, combined with increased urbanization in the region, has caused a decrease in habitable land from 10,313 square kilometres (3,982 square miles) to a fragmented area of 9,115 km^{2} (3,519 sq mi). Earlier figures estimated the cottontail's extent of occurrence to be much smaller, encompassing only 6,271 km^{2} (2,421 sq mi). The area it occupies is almost entirely within the protected areas of Chirripó, Los Quetzales National Park, and La Amistad International Park, where it is noted as being "abundant". Observations in these regions note that logging is done right up the border of the protected areas.
