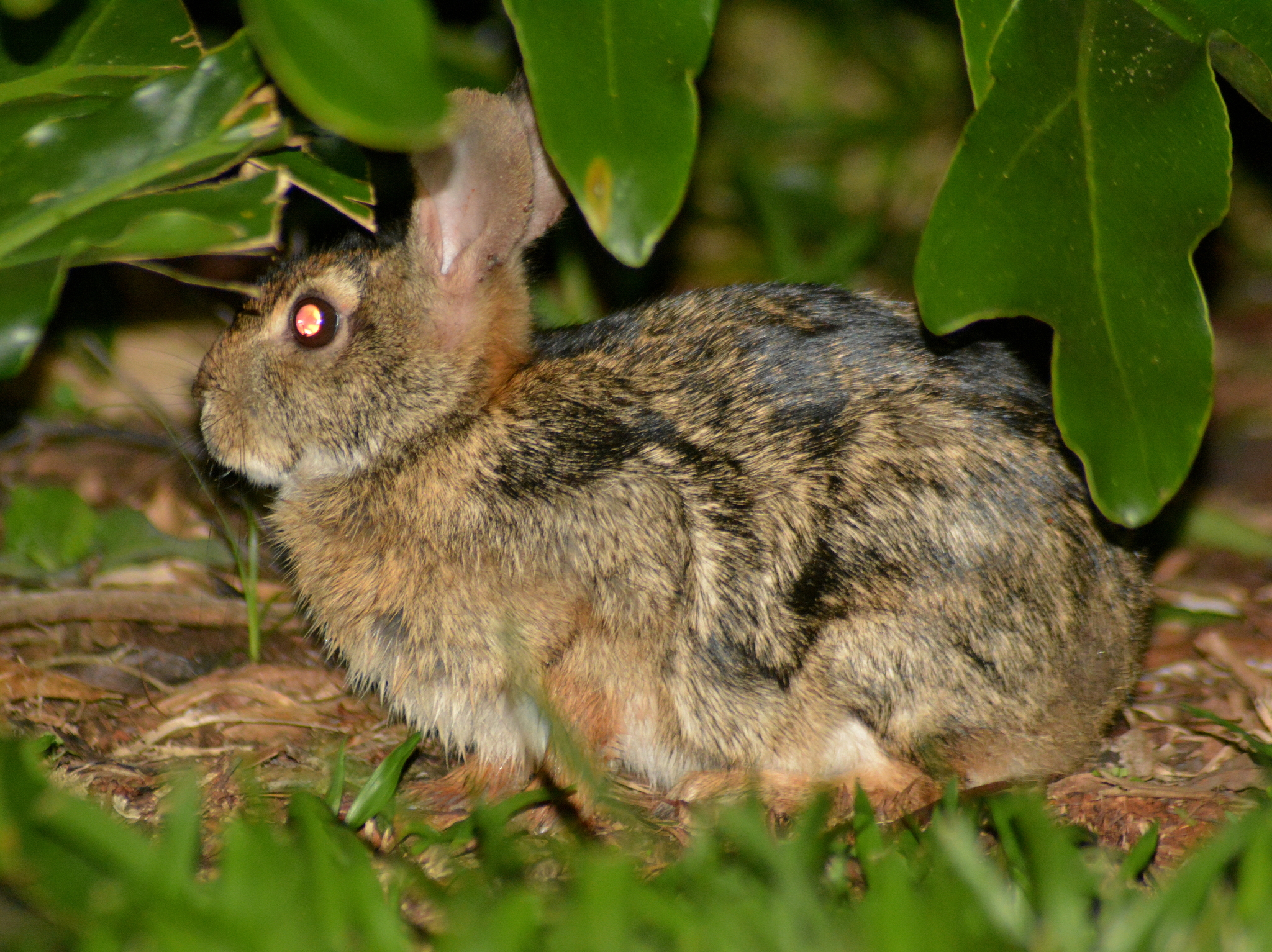
- Turvo State Park, Rio Grande do Sul, Brazil
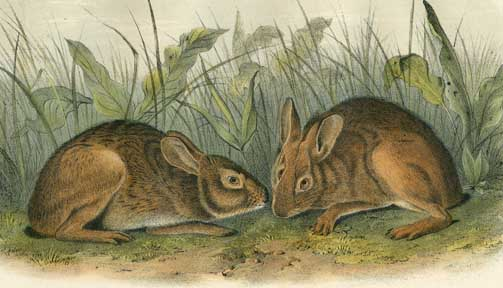
- Hand colored stone lithograph by John James Audubon, 1851

Conservation status
- Endangered (IUCN 3.1)

Scientific classification
- Kingdom: Animalia
- Phylum: Chordata
- Class: Mammalia
- Order: Lagomorpha
- Family: Leporidae
- Genus: Sylvilagus
- Species: S. brasiliensis

Binomial name
- Sylvilagus brasiliensis (Linnaeus, 1758)
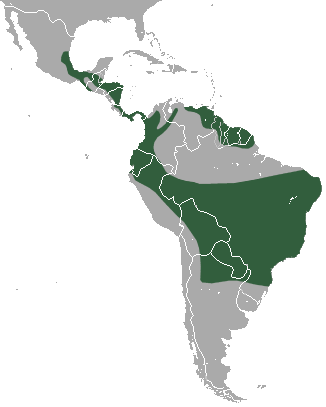
- S. brasiliensis range (as traditionally defined, see text)

Synonyms
- Lepus brasiliensis Linnaeus, 1758

= Common tapeti =

Species of mammal

The common tapeti (Sylvilagus brasiliensis), also known as the Brazilian cottontail, forest cottontail, or (formerly) simply tapeti is a species of cottontail rabbit. It is small to medium-sized with a small, dark tail, short hind feet, and short ears. As traditionally defined, its range extends from southern Mexico to northern Argentina, but this includes several distinctive population that have since been split into separate species. Under this narrower definition, the true common tapeti only occurs in the Atlantic Rainforest of coastal northeastern Brazil and it is classified as an endangered species by the IUCN. The American Society of Mammalogists concurs, but also tentatively classifies several distinct populations that have not yet received proper species names into S. brasiliensis, and so considers it to range from Venezuela south to Argentina.

== Taxonomy ==
The species was first described scientifically by Carl Linnaeus in the 10th edition of Systema Naturae, published in 1753. The type locality was in Pernambuco, Brazil. In addition to its vernacular name "tapeti", it commonly known as the "forest cottontail" or "Brazilian cottontail".

As many as 37 subspecies of the tapeti have been described, but in 2005, Mammal Species of the World recognized 21, having placed the remaining in synonymy and considering Dice's cottontail (S. dicei) as a separate species. Nevertheless, the tapeti as traditionally defined is a species complex and it was already recognized in 1990 that a taxonomic review was necessary. Consequently, recent authorities have recommended splitting off several taxa typically considered subspecies of the tapeti and recognizing them as separate species: S. andinus in the Andean highlands of Ecuador (perhaps also in the Andes of Colombia, Venezuela, and northern Peru), S. gabbi (with subspecies truei) from Panama to Mexico, S. sanctaemartae in the lowlands of northern Colombia, and S. tapetillus from coastal southeastern Brazil. Although cottontail rabbits from the Guianas have not been assigned to a subspecies, they are traditionally included in the tapeti. In 2017, these were described as a new species, S. parentum, based on specimens from Suriname.

== Description ==
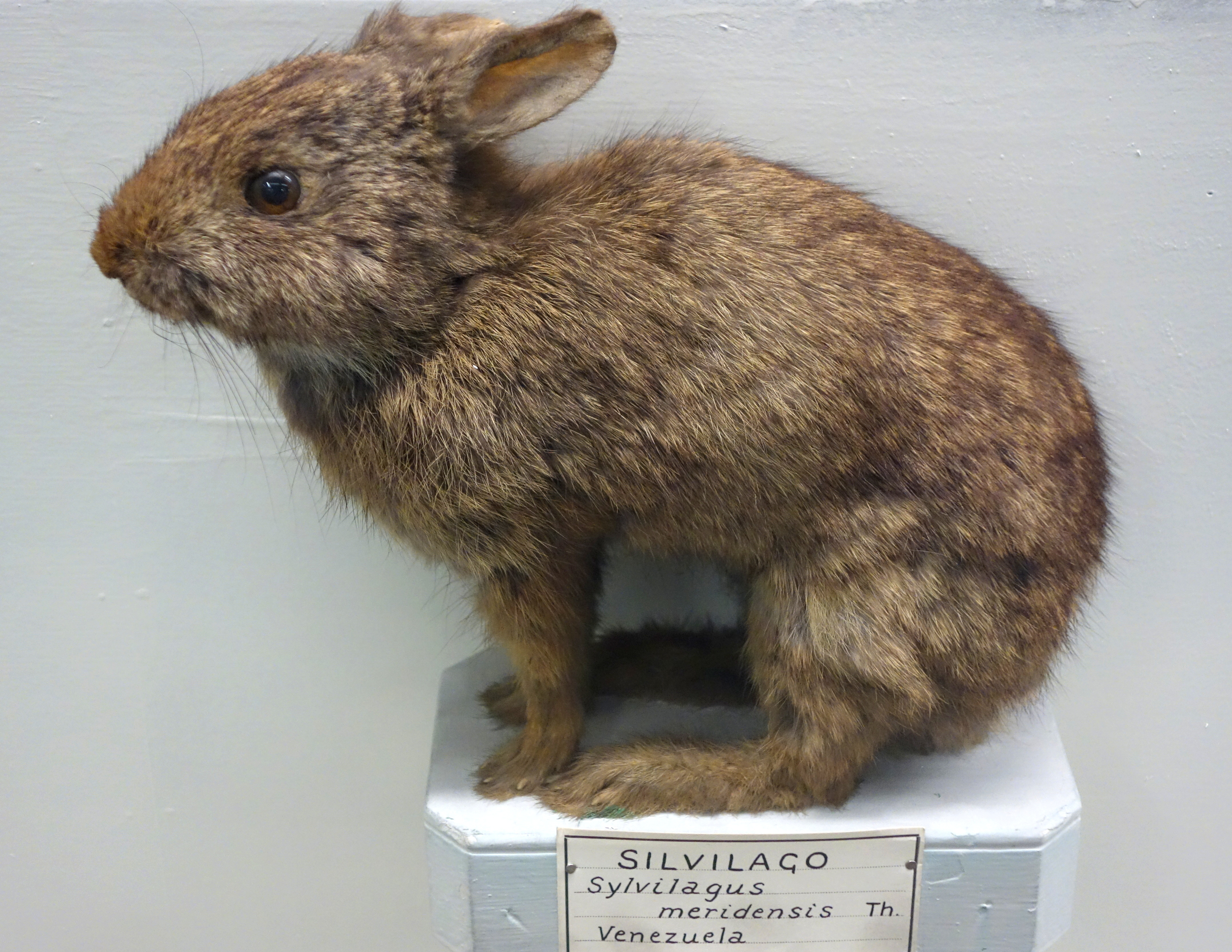
Taxidermied specimen at the Museo Civico di Storia Naturale Giacomo Doria, Genoa, Italy

The common tapeti is a small- to medium-sized rabbit. It has a head-body length of 320 mm (13 in), a tail that is 21 mm (0.83 in), hind feet measuring 71 mm (2.8 in), and ears that are 54 mm (2.1 in) (measured from notch to tip). It weighs an average of 934 g (32.9 oz). The color of its back is brown with a speckled appearance (resulting from the black hair tips), and it has a rufous spot on its neck. Its belly and tail undersides are also rufous. It has six mammae. Two different karyotypes have been reported for this species: 2n=36, FN=68; and 2n=40, FN=76.

It is a solitary, nocturnal, or more accurately crepuscular animal usually seen after nightfall or before dawn, feeding on grass and browse. It has also been recorded eating Harrya chromapes, a bolete mushroom. It is found in forested habitats, close to swamps and along river edges, and in disturbed areas, such as gardens and plantations.

== Habitat, distribution, and ecology ==
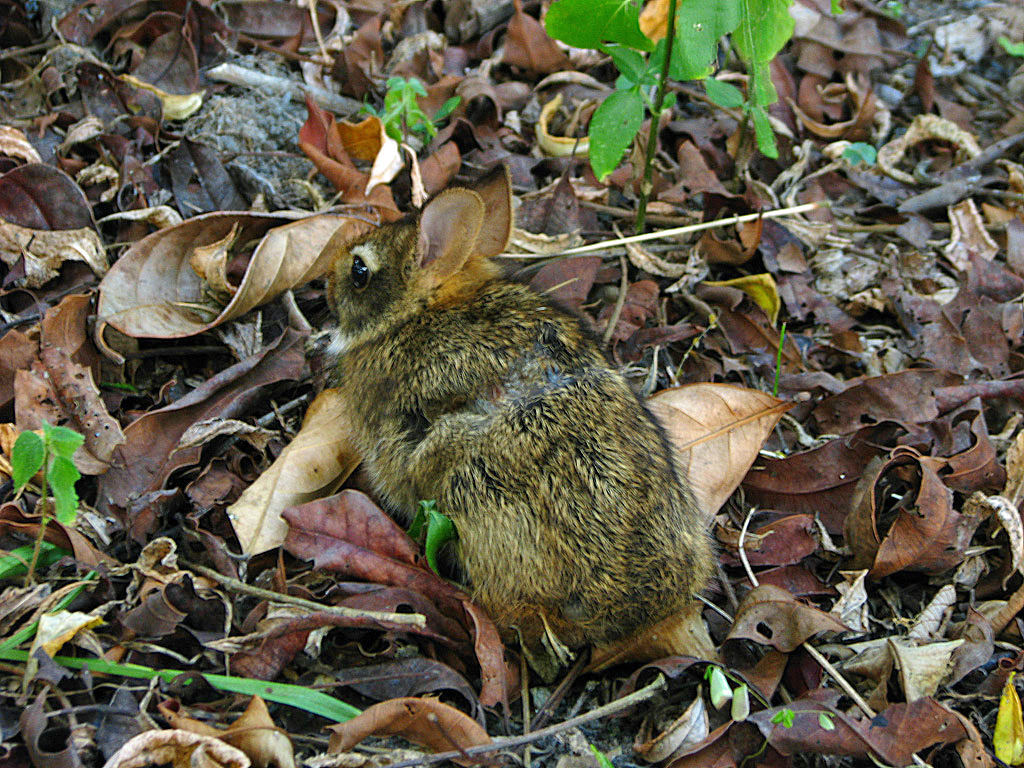
An individual in Porto Seguro, Brazil

The common tapeti occurs in tropical rain forests, deciduous forests, and second-growth forests in Mexico and Central America, as well as pastures surrounding forest habitat. Its range extends from southern Tamaulipas in Mexico, south along the eastern coast of Mexico, through Guatemala, possibly El Salvador, Honduras, eastern Nicaragua, eastern Costa Rica, and Panama. It occurs through the northern half of South America, including Peru, Bolivia, Paraguay, northern Argentina, and much of Brazil. The southern tip of its known distribution occurs in Tucuman province. It occurs at elevations from sea level to 4,800 m (15,700 ft). It is the only leporid species found in most of its range.

Rabbits build nests built of dry grasses above the ground to rear their young. They have a central chamber and three or four smaller chambers at the end of a corridor. The gestation period varies with the geographical location. Rabbits in Chiapas, Mexico, gestate for about 28 days, and have three to eight offspring, while rabbits in the Páramos of the Andes gestate for 44 days, and have an average litter size of 1.2. Both of these populations breed year-round.

Like its California relative, the brush rabbit (Sylvilagus bachmani), the common tapeti is a natural reservoir for the myxoma virus. This relationship was discovered by Brazilian physician Henrique de Beaurepaire Rohan Aragão in the 1940s. The virus causes a benign cutaneous fibroma in its hosts, but it causes the lethal disease myxomatosis, in European rabbits.
