= Santa Marta tapeti =

Conservation status
- Data Deficient (IUCN 3.1)

Scientific classification
- Kingdom: Animalia
- Phylum: Chordata
- Class: Mammalia
- Order: Lagomorpha
- Family: Leporidae
- Genus: Sylvilagus
- Species: S. sanctaemartae

Binomial name
- Sylvilagus sanctaemartae (P. Hershkovitz, 1950)

Synonyms
- Sylvilagus brasiliensis sanctaemartae P. Hershkovitz (1950)

Species of mammal

The Santa Marta tapeti (Sylvilagus sanctaemartae) is a species of cottontail rabbit native to the lowlands of northern Colombia. It was previously considered a subspecies of the common tapeti (Sylvilagus brasiliensis) but analysis in 2017 confirmed that it is sufficiently distinct in both appearance and genetics to be considered a species in its own right. The name Santa Marta tapeti is derived from the mountain range where the species was first discovered (its type locality), the Sierra Nevada de Santa Marta.
