= Pronolagus humpatensis =

Pronolagus humpatensis Temporal range: Pleistocene

Scientific classification
- Kingdom: Animalia
- Phylum: Chordata
- Class: Mammalia
- Order: Lagomorpha
- Family: Leporidae
- Genus: Pronolagus
- Species: †P. humpatensis

Binomial name
- †Pronolagus humpatensis Sen & Pickford 2022

Extinct species of mammal

Pronolagus humpatensis is a small-sized fossil species of lagomorph that lived during the Pleistocene epoch on the Humpata Plateau of Huíla, Angola. Its remains have been identified in limestone rocks found in the karsts of Huíla Province. The species is known from fragmented leg, skull and jaw bones from multiple individuals. Fossils have also been found in Namibia that may correspond to the species. It was first described in a 2022 survey of extant and fossil Pronolagus species by Sevket Sen and Martin Pickford, and was assigned to the genus mainly based on dental characteristics. It is one of only a few African fossil lagomorphs described.

== History of discovery ==
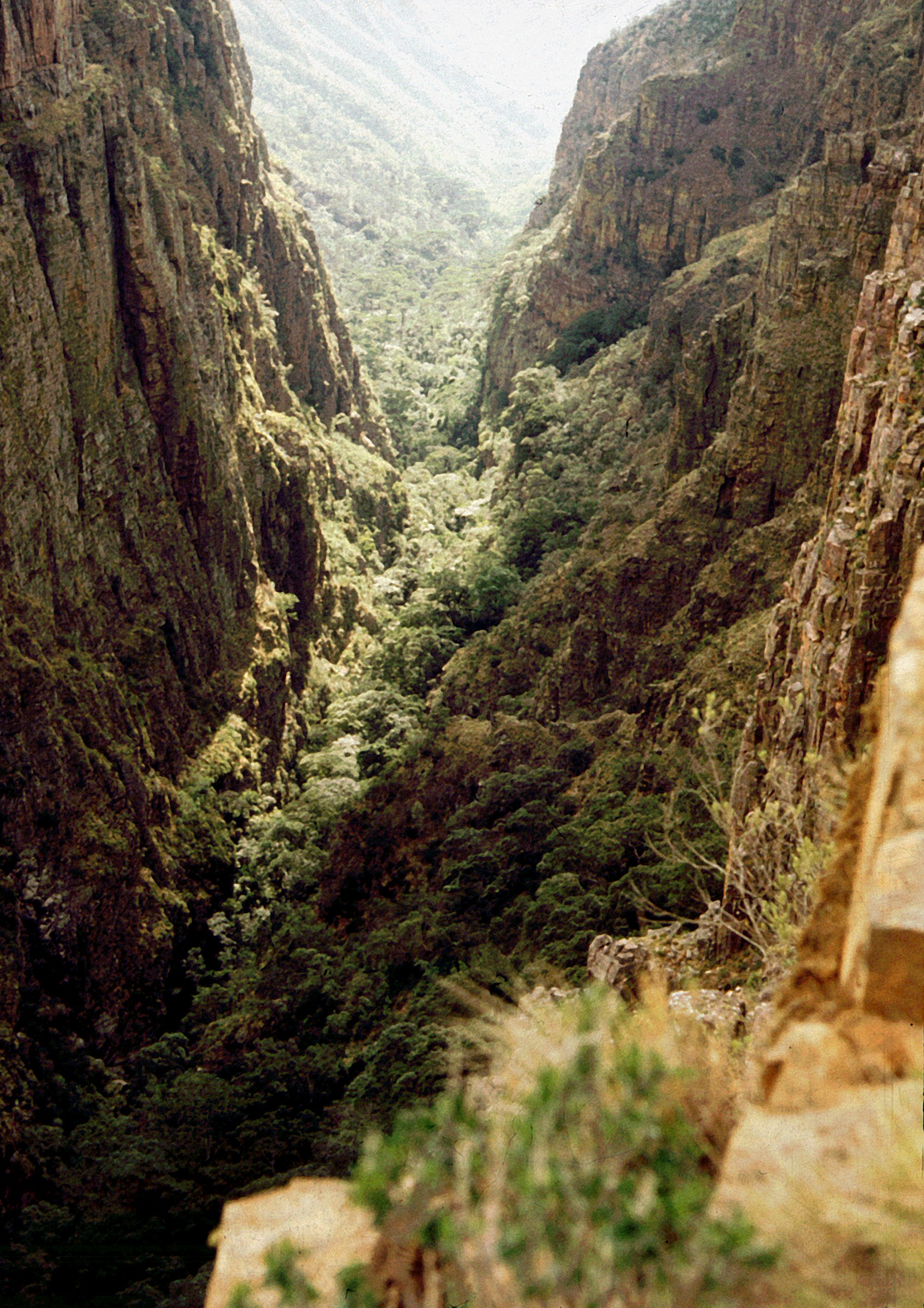
A canyon in the Huíla Plateau, the larger geographic region wherein Pronolagus humpatensis fossils were first identified

Across the African continent, lagomorph fossils are poorly documented. Many fossils are known from southern Africa, but detailed studies are lacking. Winkler and Avery, in a 2010 work on the mammals of Africa, noted that no fossil species of Pronolagus were known at the time. The fossil species Pronolagus humpatensis is the first of its genus to be described, besides the nomen oblitum (forgotten name) P. intermedius named by Henry Lyster Jameson in 1909. It was described in 2022 by Sevket Sen and Martin Pickford in their review of Pronolagus specimens and fossils. The P. humpatensis fossils described in this study were collected in 1990 and are kept at the Regional Museum of Huila in Lubango. They were prepared by the dissolution of the surrounding breccia rocks by an acetic acid solution and a buffer solution of calcium triphosphate, followed by consolidation in a solution of glyptol, a type of varnish.

Excavations in southern Africa have found evidence of Pronolagus prior to this species' first description. A 2019 excavation of breccias in Leba Cave, a location in the Humpata Plateau, discovered a single Pronolagus specimen near the surface. A 2017 excavation from the Okongwe locality of Kaokoland (in Kunene Region, Namibia) discovered several lagomorph teeth that bore similarities to those of P. humpatensis, but were labeled as Pronolagus sp. (unidentified species).

== Taxonomy ==
Pronolagus humpatensis was described based on fossils of several individuals, both cranial (belonging to the skull) and postcranial (from all other parts of the body) bones. In all, there are three mandibles from the right side of the skull, a skull fragment, a palate fragment with some cheek teeth; several postcranial bones, including five femoral fragments, ulna, tibia, and humerus fragments; astragalus, calcaneum, metacarpal, and phalanx bone fragments. The femoral fragments belonged to juvenile individuals, based on evidence of increased bone porosity and the missing head and greater trochanter. These fossil fragments were excavated from limestone breccias and tufas in the Humpata Plateau from the Tchiua and Cangalongue localities.

The holotype of the species (Tc 2'90) is a mandible fragment kept at the Regional Museum of Huila. It bears the teeth from the third premolar to the third molar and comes from the lower right side of the jaw. The specific name humpatensis is taken from its type locality, Humpata Plateau. The limestones that contained the fossils date to the early Pleistocene epoch (1.8 to 1.3 million years ago). A 2022 inventory of Angolan fossils placed the species in the Pleistocene according to Sen and Pickford's analysis.

The genus Pronolagus was described as closely related to the extinct genus Alilepus by Claude William Hibbard in 1963, which was corroborated by Winkler and Avery in 2010. However, their analyses also place the genus as being closely related to Bunolagus (the riverine rabbit), which has not been supported by studies of molecular data in 2004 by Conrad Matthee and colleagues, as well as in 2024 by Leandro Iraçabal and colleagues. These studies place Pronolagus in a clade with Poelagus (the Bunyoro rabbit) and Nesolagus (the striped rabbits):

- Leporidae
  - - - Poelagus marjorita
      - - - - Pronolagus rupestris
            - Pronolagus saundersiae
          - Pronolagus randensis
        - Pronolagus crassicaudatus
    - Nesolagus
  - Other leporids

== Description ==
Pronolagus humpatensis is a small fossil rabbit, comparable to the European rabbit (Oryctolagus cuniculus) or Smith's red rock hare (P. rupestris) in size. The latter species generally measures from 38 to 54 centimetres (15 to 21 inches) in length. P. humpatensis has a short, robust muzzle.

This fossil species is differentiated from sympatric species, both extant (those in Lepus, Pronolagus, and Bunolagus) and extinct (such as those in Trischizolagus), based on the presence or absence of dental features, as well as the dimensions of bones. The hares (in genus Lepus) found in southern Africa can be readily distinguished from the red rock hares. Their braincases (the upper and back part of the skull that protects the brain) are shorter, they have more robust faces, and the occlusion (contact) patterns of their upper and lower teeth are completely different from those seen in members of Pronolagus, with these being only a few of many skeletal differences. Another southern African species, the riverine rabbit (Bunolagus monticularis), is smaller than most red rock hares (besides Smith's red rock hare) and differs from P. humpatensis in its short muzzle, wide incisive foramen (the opening behind the incisors), wider choanae (openings between the nasal cavity and the nasopharynx behind the mouth), and short hard palate.

Besides the differences that mark it as not belonging to any of the other southern African leporid genera, several features mark P. humpatensis as belonging to Pronolagus. On the first upper molar, the tooth feature known as the hypoflexus has a slightly oblique pattern unique to the red rock hares and the Mexican volcano rabbit (Romerolagus diazi). Marked enamel folds present on the third upper premolar and second upper molar, as well as lophs (enamel ridges) on the back side of the third and fourth upper premolars, are also found in both P. humpatensis and these extant species. Other features distinguish the extinct species from currently living red rock hares. The incisive foramen of P. humpatensis is less prominently flared, and the anteroconid (a cusp at the front of the tooth) in the third lower premolar is much narrower, than that of any other member of Pronolagus. Larger, wider incisive foramina and chonae are seen in species that engage in high speed running or jumping, as is seen in living hares and the riverine rabbit, and so the large palatal openings of Smith's red rock hare and P. humpatensis indicate similarly rapid, cursorial movement, faster than that of other red rock hares. P. humpatensis is smaller in all skeletal aspects compared to the Natal red rock hare and Jameson's red rock hare, the latter of which is present in Angola. P. humpatensis is most similar in its size and some of its dental characteristics to Smith's red rock hare, but has longer and wider incisive foramina, its nasal bones are further back, and the muzzle is more elongated.

== Paleoecology ==
Pronolagus humpatensis is known only from the late Pliocene-early Pleistocene of Humpata Plateau in Angola, though it may also be associated with Plio-Pleistocene limestone tufas at Okongwe, Namibia due to the presence of very similar Pronolagus fossils there.

Humpata Plateau is a geological feature that rises 1,750 metres (5,740 ft) above sea level, on average. Various quarries exist across the plateau, many of which were used to mine materials for quicklime. These quarries and the cave systems of the plateau contain coarse pink and red breccias, as well as calcified bat guano deposits, that are liable to contain fossil remains. The limestone breccias and tufas P. humpatensis is associated with were formed both by accumulation of sediment in cave infills and calcification of bat guano. Some of the vertebrate fossils in similarly dated sedimentary infills in caves across the plateau are speculated to be remains from the prey of the crowned eagle, including several small-bodied cercopithecids weighing less than 20 kg (44 lb).
