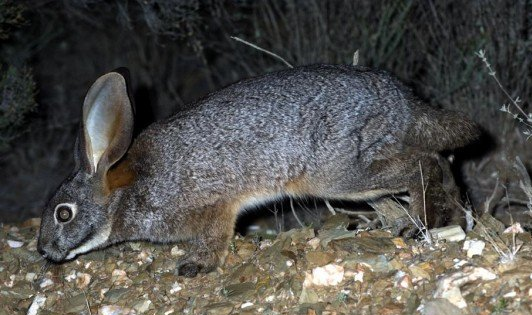
- Bunolagus monticularis in Western Cape, South Africa

Conservation status
- Critically Endangered (IUCN 3.1)

Scientific classification
- Kingdom: Animalia
- Phylum: Chordata
- Class: Mammalia
- Order: Lagomorpha
- Family: Leporidae
- Genus: Bunolagus; Thomas, 1929
- Species: B. monticularis

Binomial name
- Bunolagus monticularis (Thomas, 1903)
- Historic distribution of the Riverine rabbit as described by the IUCN in 2019 Extant (resident)

= Riverine rabbit =

Riverine rabbit Temporal range: Middle Pleistocene–present 0.4–0 Ma

Species of mammal

The riverine rabbit (Bunolagus monticularis), also known as the bushman rabbit or bushman hare, is a species of rabbit that lives among patches of thick vegetation in the Karoo of South Africa's Western and Northern Cape provinces. It is the only member of the genus Bunolagus. It is classified a critically endangered species by the International Union for Conservation of Nature (IUCN); the most recent estimates of the species' population range from 157 to 207 mature individuals, and 224 to 380 total.

First identified in 1903 as a member of the hares, the riverine rabbit is a medium-sized rabbit, about 33.7 to 47.0 centimetres (13.3 to 18.5 in) long. Its fur has a unique dark brown stripe from the edge of its mouth to the base of its ears, and a white to grey ring around each eye. It is nocturnal and herbivorous, and its diet consists of grasses, flowers and leaves, most of which are dicotyledons. The riverine rabbit digs burrows in the soft alluvial soils of its habitat near seasonal rivers for protection from the heat and for females to nest and protect the young. It is the only African rabbit known to dig its own burrows. Riverine rabbits are polygamous, and live alone throughout the year.

Unlike most rabbits, female riverine rabbits produce only one to two young per year. This contributes to its status as critically endangered, along with habitat loss from agricultural development, soil erosion, and predators. Human impacts on the environment have a significant impact on the species' continued survivability. Currently, there are conservation plans being enacted to stabilise its population and protect its habitat.

== Taxonomy and evolution ==
The riverine rabbit's scientific name is Bunolagus monticularis. It was first described from two specimens by the British zoologist Oldfield Thomas in 1903 as Lepus monticularis, with Lepus being the genus of the hares. The type specimen, a female of the species, was collected by Claude H. B. Grant in Deelfontein, Cape Colony, South Africa and sent to the Natural History Museum, London (then the National Museum) by Arthur Sloggett, where it still resides today. It was then known as the "Kopje Hare of Deelfontein". The specific name monticularis is derived from the Latin monticulus, meaning 'little mountain' and referring to the kopjes (diminutive word for 'mountain', kop, in Afrikaans) where it was found. It was separated into its own genus Bunolagus in 1929, due to the distinguishing characteristics of its thick, short limbs, uniformly coloured, cylindrical tail, and some aspects of the skull. However, the external resemblance of the riverine rabbit to several other rabbits and its hare-like cranium led to confusion among taxonomists for several decades. Analysis of the species' karyotype in 1983, as well as later genetic analysis, confirmed its placement in a monotypic genus.

Other common names of Bunolagus monticularis include bushman hare and bushman rabbit. Afrikaans common names include boshaas and vleihaas, referring to its moist and dense habitat; bos means 'forest' or 'thicket', vlei means 'swamp', and haas means 'hare'. Other Afrikaans common names are pondhaas, 'pound hare', referring to the fact that specimens were once sought for a pound sterling each by the curator of the Kaffrarian Museum, mammalogist Guy C. Shortridge. It is also known as the doekvoetjie, 'cloth foot', referring to the rabbit's furred hind feet, and oewerkonyn, 'shore rabbit'.

Bunolagus monticularis is most closely related to the European rabbit, the hispid hare, and the Amami rabbit. The following cladogram is based on work done by Matthee and colleagues in 2004 and clarifications from Abrantes and colleagues in 2011, and is based on nuclear and mitochondrial gene analysis:

Lagomorphs

- - Nesolagus (striped rabbits)
  - - Poelagus (Bunyoro rabbit)
    - Pronolagus (red rock hares)
- - Romerolagus (volcano rabbit)
  - - - - - Sylvilagus (cottontails)
          - Brachylagus (pygmy rabbit)
        - - - - Bunolagus (riverine rabbit)
              - Oryctolagus (European rabbit)
            - Caprolagus (hispid hare)
          - Pentalagus (Amami rabbit)
    - Lepus (hares)

There are no confirmed fossils of Bunolagus. It was thought to date back to the middle Pleistocene, 0.4 million years ago in South Africa. Its distribution has likely always been very restricted. One fossil record of the genus was described in 1983, but as of 2007, the associated fossils have been reconsidered as small specimens of Lepus. No subspecies are recognized, but there are significant genetic differences between isolated populations above and below the Great Escarpment.

== Characteristics ==
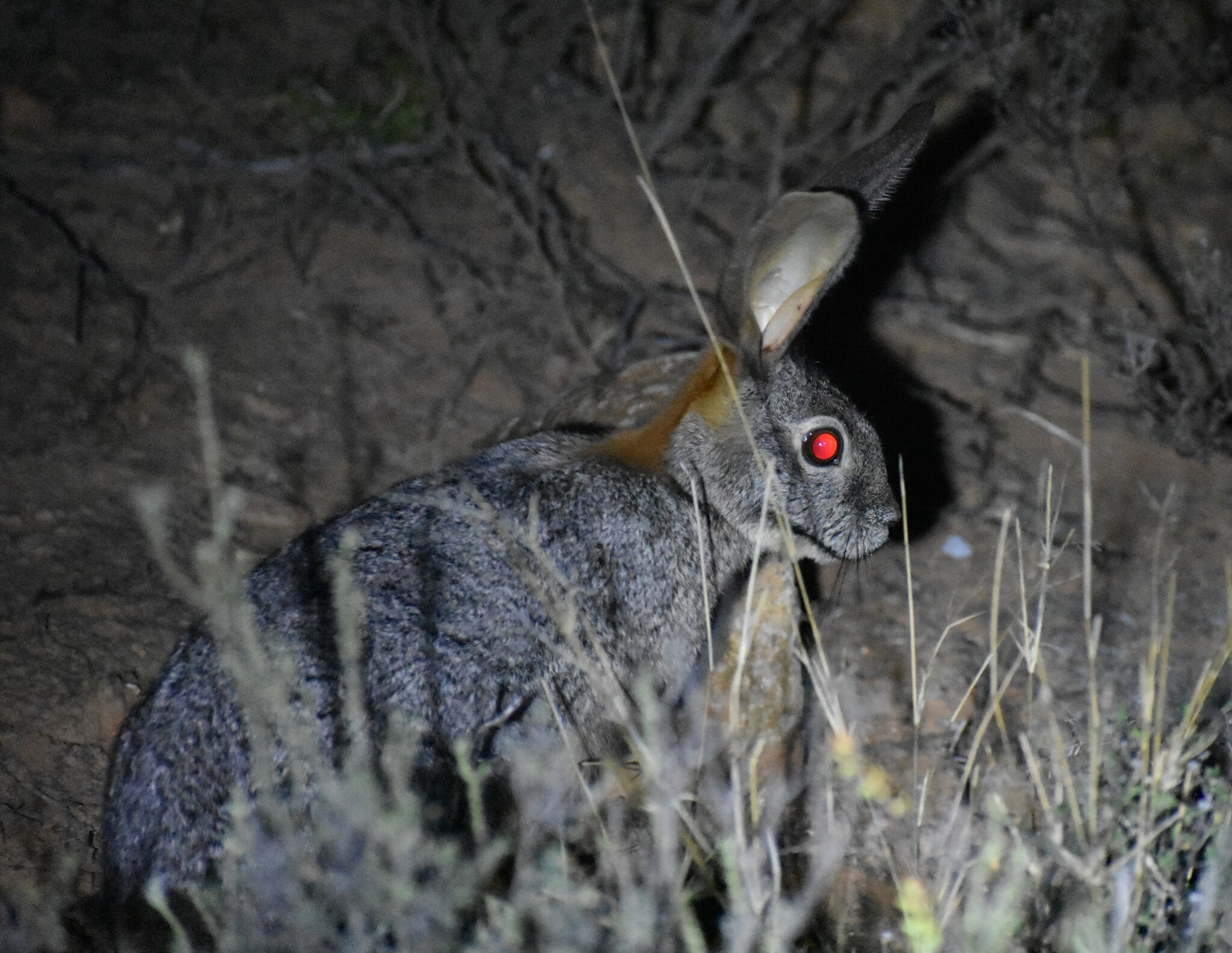

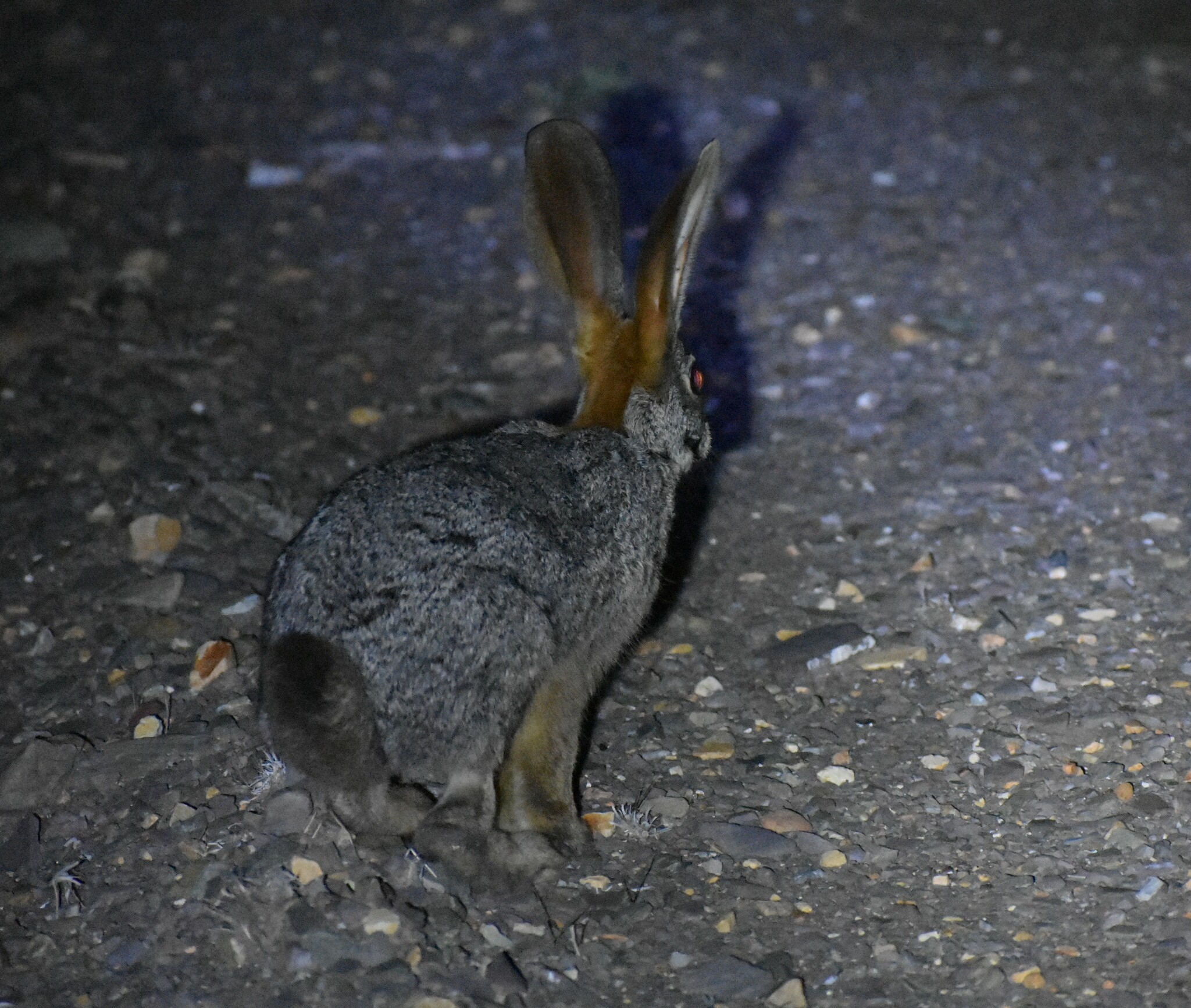
Riverine rabbit in the Klein Karoo from two angles, showing the rufous nuchal patch and brown tail

The riverine rabbit has an adult head and body length of 33.7 to 47.0 centimetres (13.3 to 18.5 in), and typically has a dark brown stripe running from the lower jaw over the cheek and upwards towards the base of the ears, and a white ring around each eye. The nuchal patch (the section of fur on the nape of the neck to the base of the ears), as well as the limbs and lower flanks, are rufous in colour. The underside and throat are cream-coloured. Their tails are pale brown with a tinge of black toward the tip and their limbs are short and heavily furred, with the hind foot measuring 9–12 centimetres (3.5–4.7 in). Its coat is soft and silky, more so than that of hares, and is of a reddish-brown to black shade. The ears measure 11–12 centimetres (4.3–4.7 in) and are rounded at the tips. Females are slightly larger than males. Its dental formula is 2.0.3.31.0.2.3 × 2 = 28—two pairs of upper and one pair of lower incisors, no canines, three upper and two lower premolars on each side, and three upper and lower molars on either side of the jaw—as is the case with all leporids.

The riverine rabbit appears similar to hares (lagomorphs in the genus Lepus). It most closely resembles the Cape hare (Lepus capensis) in its morphology, but not in its fur patterns. The skulls of hares and the riverine rabbit are similar, with the main difference being that the riverine rabbit's is smaller and lacks an opening (foramen) near the premolar teeth. The bulla, a bone structure enclosing the base of the ear, is much larger than that of most other rabbits; the volcano rabbit (Romerolagus) and pygmy rabbit (Brachylagus) have similarly large bullae, but smaller pinnae (the externally visible part of the ear). It is sometimes compared to the red rock hares, some of which overlap it in distribution; in its first description, it was noted as being about the same size as the Natal red rock hare (Pronolagus crassicaudatus), though it has been later described as smaller than all red rock hares besides Smith's red rock hare (P. rupestris).

== Habitat and distribution ==
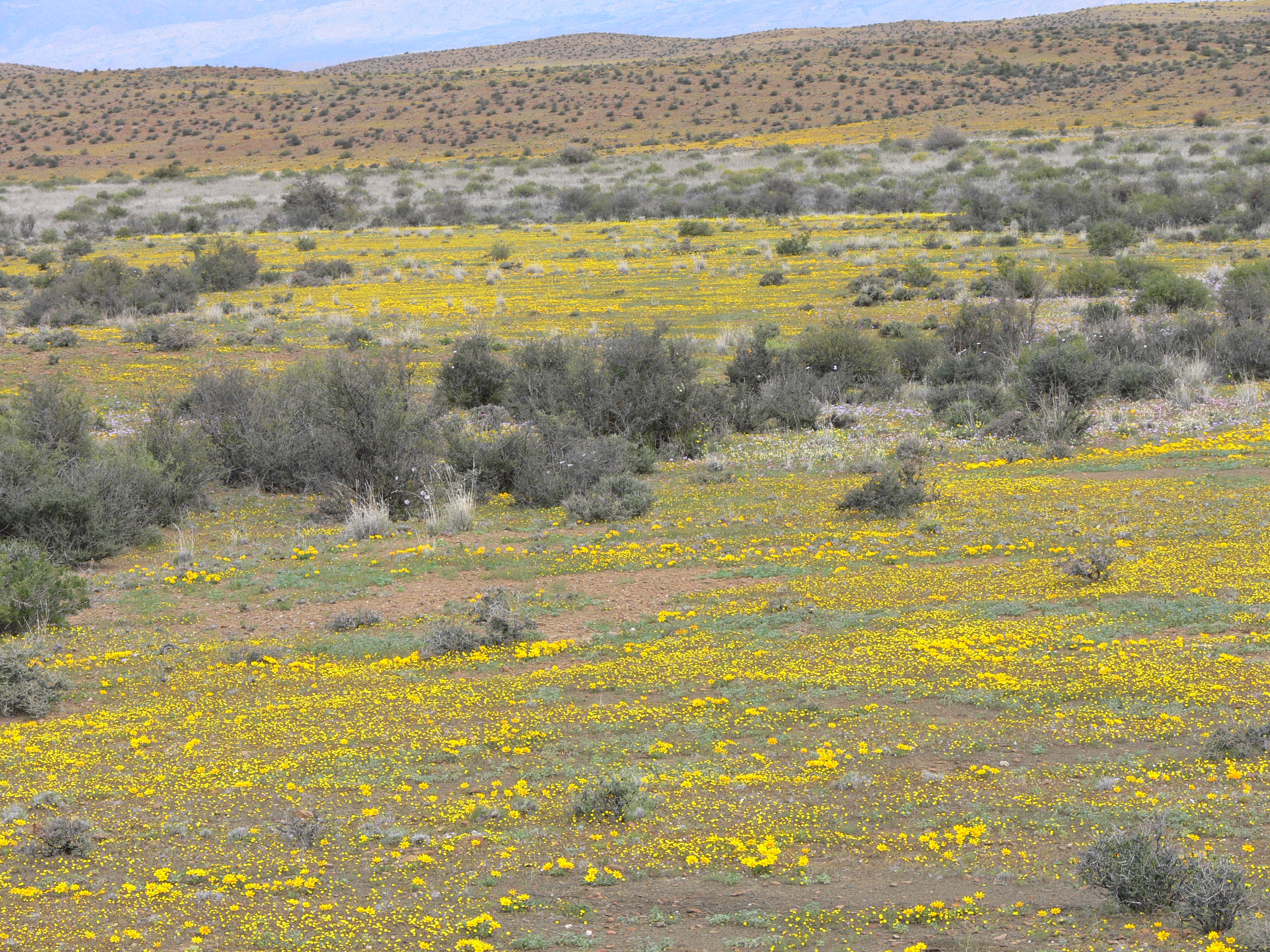
The Karoo in South Africa, the location of the riverine rabbit's habitat

The riverine rabbit lives in riverine vegetation on alluvial soils adjacent to seasonal rivers. It prefers areas of dense vegetation in river basins and shrubland. The soft alluvial soils of the river basins allow it to create burrows and dens for protection, breeding young, and thermoregulation; it is the only African rabbit known to construct its own burrows. The riverine rabbit requires particular vegetation and soil to construct its burrows, and is sensitive to changes in habitat; thus, it is considered an indicator species within its distribution. Plants in the family Amaranthaceae, those in the genus Lycium, and Salsola glabrescens dominate the rabbit's habitat.

The riverine rabbit has a disjunct distribution and historically occurred in two restricted regions in the Karoo, with the most populated regions being the Upper Karoo and Bushmanland Vloere (salt pan) areas. Nine distinct populations occur within the species' northern habitat on elevated ground north of the Great Escarpment, and two or three southern populations, which have only been known since 2004, occupy the regions surrounding the Breede, Gourits and Olifants River systems. None of these subpopulations contain more than 50 individuals. Historically, there were five additional subpopulations in localities near the tributaries of and alongside the Vis and Renoster rivers, but it is now considered locally extinct in these regions.

== Behaviour and ecology ==
Riverine rabbits are solitary and nocturnal. They feed on grasses, as well as the flowers and leaves of dicotyledons. During the day, they rest in forms (hollow excavations scraped in the soil under shrubs). The riverine rabbit is polygamous, and it lives and browses for food alone. The size and overlap of home ranges varies based on sex: the males' home ranges overlap slightly with those of various females, with males having an average home range size roughly 60% larger than females (20.9 hectares (52 acres) compared to 12.9 hectares (32 acres)). This home range size is the largest of all rabbits, though it is smaller than those of most hares. The breeding season takes place between August and May, wherein females will make a grass- and fur-lined nest in a burrow, blocking the entrance with soil and twigs to keep out predators. The average length of a generation is two years; in captivity, individuals have been recorded as living up to five years.

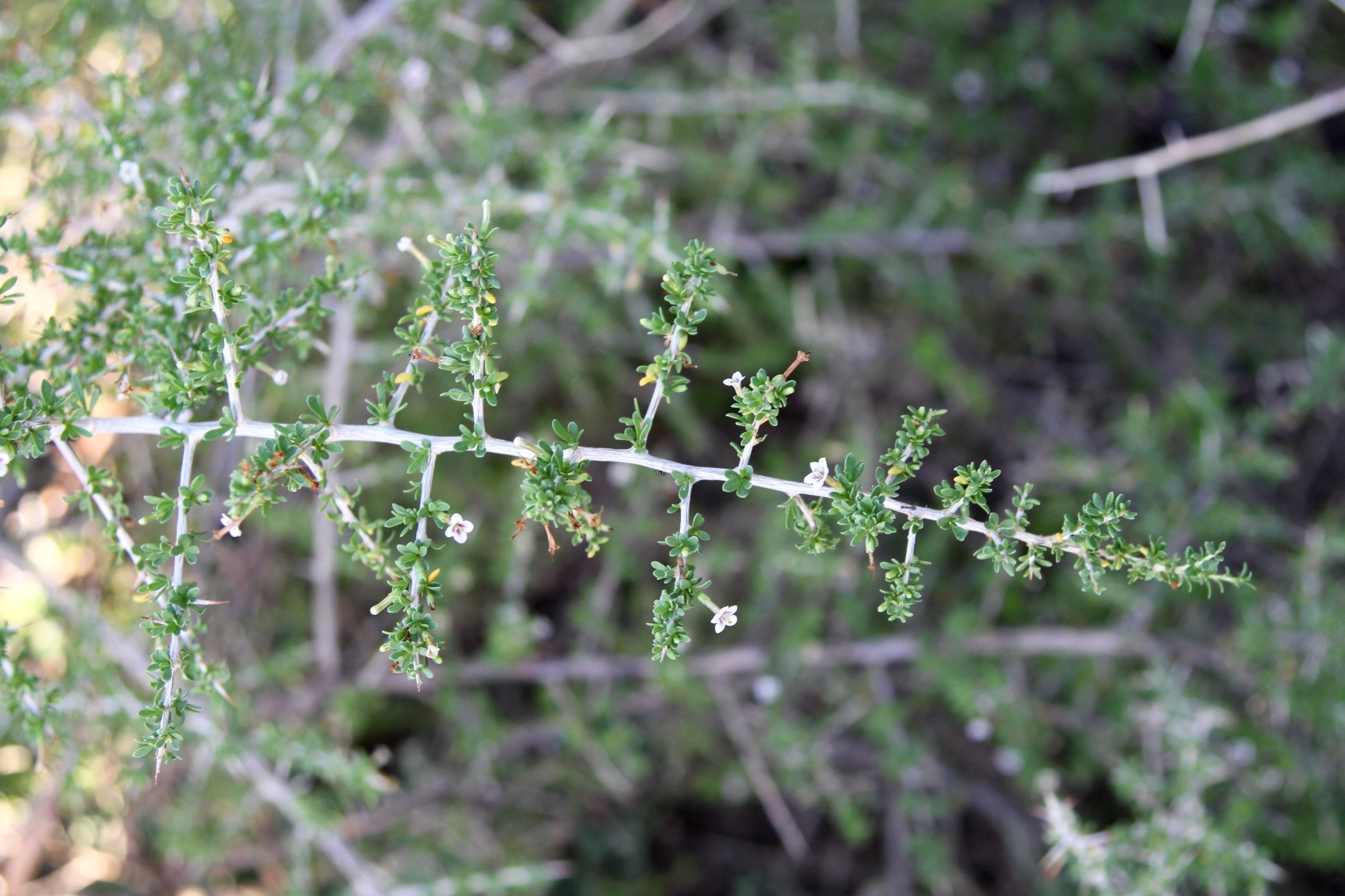
Lycium, a staple of the riverine rabbit diet

The riverine rabbit mainly feeds through browsing. When grasses are available during the wet season, they are the rabbit's preferred food, but most of the time its diet is restricted to the flowers and leaves of dicotyledons in the Karoo. These include species in the families Asteraceae, Amaranthaceae, and Aizoaceae, particularly salt-loving plants such as Salsola and Lycium that grow along seasonal rivers in the desert. According to one study, the diet comprises 11.2% Lycium and 34.8% Amaranthaceae. Aside from their conventional food intake, they also consume soft droppings that come directly from the anus in the process known as cecotrophy.

Populations in the more northern areas of the species' distribution are more strongly associated with vegetation that grows narrowly along seasonal rivers; those in the southern parts of its distribution are not as closely tied to this type of vegetation and have been observed feeding on newly grown plants in fallow land.

The riverine rabbit has a polygamous mating system, wherein males will mate with multiple females. Based on limited observations, the breeding season takes place from August through May, and gestation takes 35 to 36 days. It bears its young underground for protection, relying on soft soil in the flood plains of its habitat to construct its breeding burrows. These burrows are lined with fur and grass, and the entrance is closed off with dirt and twigs for camouflage from predators. This burrow is 20–30 centimetres (7.9–11.8 in) long, and the nesting chamber within is 12–17 centimetres (4.7–6.7 in) wide. The young are reared in the nesting chamber for the first 2 weeks after birth. The riverine rabbit has 44 diploid chromosomes, as do several closely related rabbits, the European rabbit (Oryctolagus cuniculus) and hispid hare (Caprolagus hispidus).

The young that the rabbit produces, one to two kits per litter, are altricial—born bald, blind, and helpless. Each kit weighs from 40 to 50 grams (0.088 to 0.110 pounds). The helpless young stay with the mother until they are capable of living on their own.

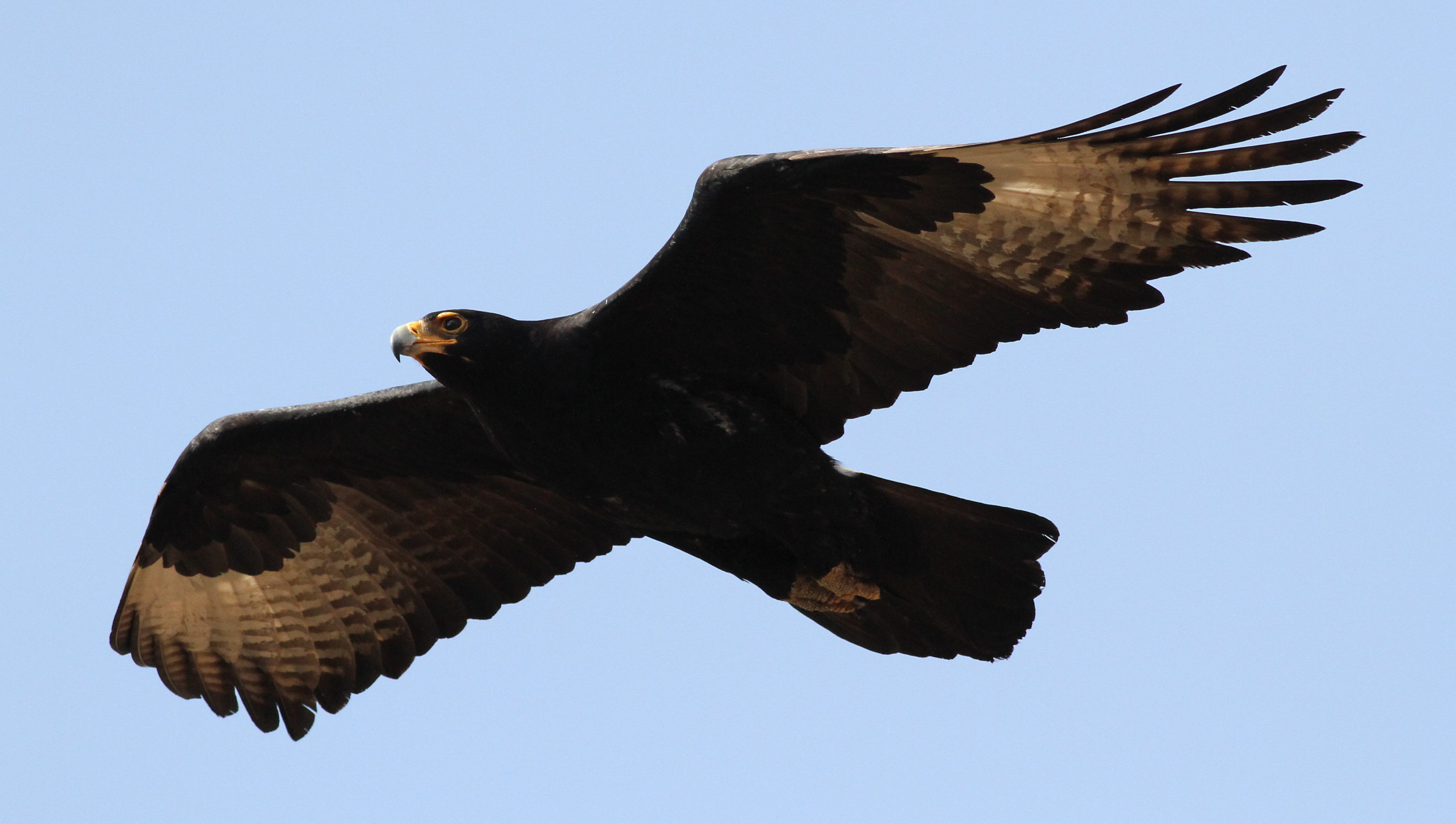
Verraux's eagle, a predator of the riverine rabbit

The riverine rabbit is hunted by Verreaux's eagles, African wildcats, and caracals.

== Status and conservation ==
The riverine rabbit is considered to be in extreme danger of extinction. From 1947 to 1979, it was thought to be extinct, having not been recorded by scientists at all in the intervening years. In 1981, it was first labelled as an endangered species. The International Union for Conservation of Nature (IUCN) classified it as critically endangered in 2002. The National Red List of South Africa maintained by the South African National Biodiversity Institute (SANBI) uses this same classification. Both organizations maintain this position as of their most recent evaluations from 2016. In 2016, the species was estimated to have a population of 157 to 207 mature rabbits and up to 380 overall, which continues to decline. This species' population is divided into several isolated groups, about 12 in total, all with less than 50 rabbits in each. These isolated populations are separated by jackal-proof fencing that surrounds extensive livestock farms. A 1990 study put forth that the remaining habitat was only able to support 1,435 rabbits, and in 2019, it was estimated that the species occupied a region spanning 2,943 square kilometres (1,136 sq mi) in total. Later studies in 2020 and 2022 put forth that there may be more subpopulations than originally thought, and that the extent of species' endangerment could be exaggerated.

The decline in the riverine rabbit population is largely due to the alteration of its historically limited habitat. Over half of the rabbit's range has been rendered unable to support the species due to agricultural development since 1970. From the early 20th century up until 2008, over two-thirds of its habitat had been lost. Removal of the natural vegetation along the rivers and streams causes loss of alluvial soils and prevents rabbits from constructing stable breeding burrows. Overgrazing of domestic herbivores also causes degradation and habitat fragmentation. Commercial agricultural development has contributed significantly to habitat loss, with much of the rabbit's former habitat rendered inhabitable or closed off. The remaining land left to support the species is being damaged by climate change and logging. Removal and exploitation of trees limits the rabbit's opportunities for shelter from heat and predators. Structures on rivers like dams isolate subpopulations from each other, discouraging population regeneration. Relatively recent threats to the riverine rabbit are fracking and wind farm developments in the Nama Karoo, the former of which could alter the region's hydrology, and both of which will further fragment the available habitat.

In addition to being threatened through loss of habitat, the riverine rabbit may also be susceptible to myxomatosis, as it shares genes that are affected by the Myxoma virus with the European rabbit, which is significantly impacted by the resultant disease. If the riverine rabbit species were to be exposed to the virus, its numbers could be reduced drastically. The species is also suspected to be hunted for bushmeat or accidentally trapped by farm workers and for sport, though its preference for dense vegetation may thwart hunting efforts that use dogs.

Relative to other similar species, known information about key aspects of the riverine rabbit, such as behaviour and diet, is deficient. Conservation efforts are better informed by researching this species and involving local communities, particularly farmers. Plans to protect the remaining populations have been criticized, with experts claiming that a large part of the remaining land that can support the rabbit is outside the area being preserved for it. Additionally, studies are susceptible to sampling bias, and failure to account for climactic and biological variables can lead to error, which can impact conservation recommendations. Efforts have been made to form agreements with and educate landowners to ensure that certain measures are taken to help and reduce harm to rabbit populations, though as of 2018 few private reserves or protected areas overlapped regions where the riverine rabbit is present. A 2016 assessment by SANBI noted that there were increased sightings of the species within its extent of occurrence, and that camera traps and further observations were needed to confirm the spread of subpopulations in regions south and eastward of the rabbit's native range.

The IUCN recommends further conservation measures in addition to those already planned and advised by SANBI. They recommend capturing the animal as to safely allow it to reproduce without danger of predators or starvation. They also recommend different methods of managing the habitat and the population in the wild. Conservation of the rabbit's habitat and maintaining interconnection between populations is important to the conservation of the species, as its complex genetic structure makes breeding with groups outside of the species difficult, if not impossible. An early breeding colony was established at the De Wildt Cheetah and Wildlife Centre near Pretoria in the late 20th century due to the species' rarity and the centre's historic success in breeding the cheetah and wild dog, though efforts in the early 1990s were met with failure due to poor planning and low genetic diversity. Monitoring of rabbit populations to evaluate effectiveness of current and potential conservation actions has been carried out in part by the Endangered Wildlife Trust. One location being monitored is Sanbona Wildlife Reserve, a protected wilderness area with a successful breeding population where the species is being researched, though efforts to improve population numbers in the wild are favored over captive breeding options according to SANBI. The species' extent as of 2024 is being evaluated through analysis of droppings across the Karoo region.
