= Brachylagus coloradoensis =

Brachylagus coloradoensis Temporal range: Early - Mid Pleistocene

Scientific classification
- Kingdom: Animalia
- Phylum: Chordata
- Class: Mammalia
- Infraclass: Placentalia
- Order: Lagomorpha
- Family: Leporidae
- Genus: Brachylagus
- Species: †B. coloradoensis

Binomial name
- †Brachylagus coloradoensis (Ramos, 1999)

Extinct species of rabbit

Brachylagus coloradoensis is an extinct species of lagomorph closely related to the pygmy rabbit (Sylvilagus idahoensis). Its fossils have been found in Early and Middle Pleistocene deposits in Colorado and Nevada.

== Description ==
Brachylagus coloradoensis was slightly larger than the living pygmy rabbit. Its enamel patterns show intermediate characteristics between the pygmy rabbit and the extinct genus Hypolagus, which suggests that Brachylagus evolved from the latter.
