= Rock rabbit =

Rock rabbit can refer to:

- Hyraxes, mammals of the Order Hyracoidea
- Pikas, mammals of the Family Ochotonidae
- Viscachas, mammals in the Family Chinchilloidea
- Red rock hares, mammals in the genus Pronolagus
