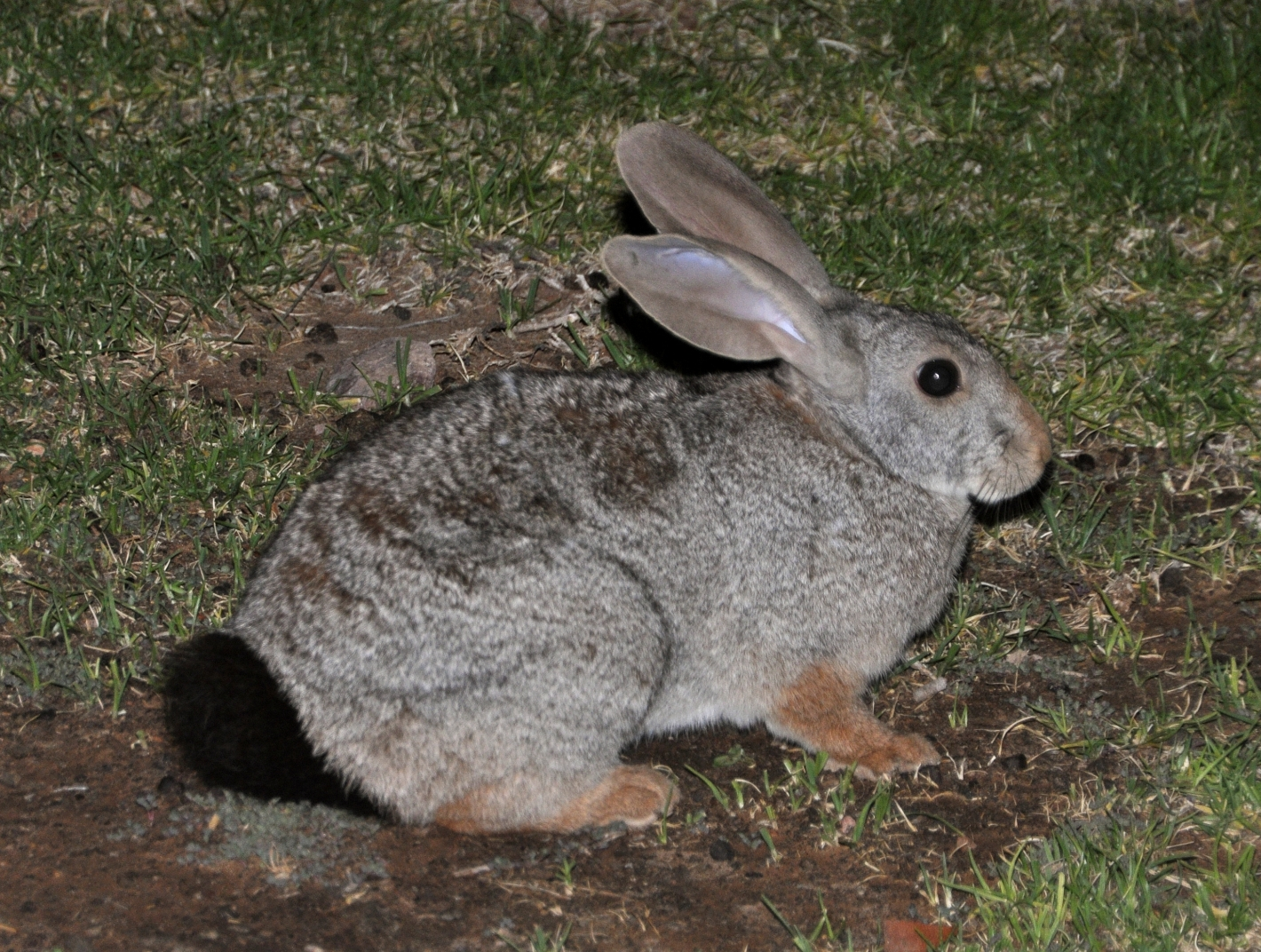
- Jameson's red rock hare near Twyfelfontein, Namibia

Conservation status
- Least Concern (IUCN 3.1)

Scientific classification
- Kingdom: Animalia
- Phylum: Chordata
- Class: Mammalia
- Order: Lagomorpha
- Family: Leporidae
- Genus: Pronolagus
- Species: P. randensis

Binomial name
- Pronolagus randensis Jameson, 1907
- P. randensis range

Synonyms
- Pronolagus ruddi randensis Jameson, 1907

= Jameson's red rock hare =

Species of mammal

Jameson's red rock hare (Pronolagus randensis) is a species of rabbit in the family Leporidae found in rocky habitats in Zimbabwe, Angola, Namibia, South Africa, Botswana, and Mozambique. It is rufous and brown-furred, nocturnal, 42 to 50 cm (17 to 20 in) in length and 1.82 to 2.95 kg (4.0 to 6.5 lb) in weight—slightly smaller than the largest of the red rock hare species, the Natal red rock hare (P. crassicaudatus).

The species is generally solitary when not breeding or grazing. Jameson's red rock hare feeds only at night. While grazing, it is sometimes seen in small groups feeding upon grasses and fresh shoots. Little is known about its mating behaviour, and its predators are similar to those of other red rock hares. It is classified as a least-concern species by the International Union for Conservation of Nature (IUCN), being abundant in the protected areas its distribution overlaps, but its population is decreasing.

== Taxonomy and evolution ==
Pronolagus randensis was first described by and named after Irish zoologist Henry Lyster Jameson in 1907 at Observatory Hill, now Johannesburg, in what was at that time the Transvaal Colony. Jameson originally considered it a subspecies of Pronolagus ruddi, a species named two years earlier by Oldfield Thomas and Harold Schwann that is now synonymous with Pronolagus crassicaudatus. The specific name randensis is derived from the colloquial name, "the Rand", for the Witwatersrand area where the species' type specimen was described. In 1971, there were ten listed subspecies, which decreased to nine in later descriptions; by 2005, only 3 subspecies were recognized:

- Pronolagus randensis randensis (Jameson, 1907)
- Pronolagus randensis caucinus (Thomas, 1929)
- Pronolagus randensis whitei (Roberts, 1938)

P. randensis has a disjunct distribution, with an eastern population historically classified as P. r. randensis and a western population as P. r. caucinus. P. r. whitei, first thought to be its own species of red rock hare found in parts of Zimbabwe and Mozambique, was considered a subspecies of P. randensis in Waldo Meester's 1986 Classification of Southern African Mammals, wherein he speculated that P. randensis may actually only make up two subspecies, P. r. randensis and P. r. caucinus. A mitochondrial DNA study in 1993 supported this hypothesis.

By 2014, it was questioned whether any subspecies of P. randensis was valid. Currently, no subspecies are recognized, and no significant variation has been observed among the previously described forms. In southern Angola, unusual distribution patterns of the species have led to tentative descriptions of the subspecies P. r. waterbergensis and P. r. moçamedensis, with the former occurring above an elevation of 2,000 metres (6,600 ft) in Huíla Province, and the latter occurring on the coastal plain and having distinctive coloration.

=== Fossil record ===
Fossil evidence of Pronolagus randensis, like that of other red rock hares, is scarce and was poorly documented before the 21st century. Its holotype is a female individual that is currently preserved at the Natural History Museum, London. While the genus as a whole has been described from the early Pliocene onward, historic fossil occurrences have often not been described or illustrated, and distinct information on speciation is unclear, though a nuclear and mitochondrial DNA study by Matthee et al. indicates P. rupestris as being the second-most basal of the species in Pronolagus, following P. crassicaudatus.

Remains of P. randensis have been found in Gondolin Cave and rock shelters in the Brandberg Mountain area, indicating occupation and use by hunter-gatherer groups who would have caught red rock hares by hand or snare.

== Distribution and habitat ==
Pronolagus randensis has a disjunct distribution, with one population extending from southern Angola to western and central Namibia and the other occurring mainly in Zimbabwe, extending into South Africa, Botswana, and slightly into Mozambique. The two populations are separated by roughly 900 kilometres (560 mi) of unsuitable habitat. It is particularly abundant in Zimbabwe's Matopos Hills and around sandstone formations found in eastern Botswana.

Jameson's red rock hare inhabits rocky environments such as kopjes, canyons, and cliffs, relying on rock crevices and boulders for shelter. It occupies lower elevations than Hewitt's red rock hare (Pronolagus saundersiae), where there is less rainfall; the two species can also be distinguished in regions where they are sympatric by their ears and tail, as P. saundersiae has on average longer ears and a shorter tail than P. randensis. P. randensis inhabits rocky areas with grass or scrub and generally remains within its habitat, though it may disperse up to 22 km (14 mi) when needed. P. randensis does not share its distribution with that of either the Natal red rock hare (Pronolagus crassicaudatus) or Smith's red rock hare (Pronolagus rupestris).

== Characteristics ==
Pronolagus randensis has a fine, silky fur which is grizzled rufous-brown on the upper parts of the body. It has a whitish chin and slightly lighter fur on the ventrum. The base of its hairs is a pale cinnamon color. The sides of the neck, lower jaw and cheeks are light grey in colour. It has a 6–13.5-centimetre (2.4–5.3 in) reddish-brown, black tipped tail. The large (8–10 cm (3.1–3.9 in)) ears are sparsely haired and sometimes are tipped with black. When fully grown, P. randensis can weigh from 1.82 to 2.95 kilograms (4.0 to 6.5 pounds), with body length measuring from 42 to 50 cm (17 to 20 in). It is slightly smaller than the largest red rock hare, the Natal red rock hare (Pronolagus crassicaudatus), though on average it has longer ears and tail.

=== Skeletal morphology ===
Pronolagus randensis possesses several characteristics in its skeletal morphology that are useful in distinguishing it from other members of Pronolagus, particularly in museum collections where external features may not be preserved. The skull of P. randensis has a much more pronounced curve in profile compared to other members of the genus. Another notable feature is the frontal-parietal suture, which is positioned behind the rear attachments of the cheekbones, creating a larger frontal bone surface on the skull's roof compared to other species. On the underside of the skull, the openings in the palate are flared in their rear half, similar to P. crassicaudatus but different from P. rupestris where these openings are narrower. The size of the incisors may be useful in distinguishing the members of Pronolagus apart, with those of P. randensis having greater average width than P. rupestris but less than P. crassicaudatus (P. saundersiae was not considered a distinct species at the time of evaluation). The principal incisors have grooves that are not filled with cementum.

== Behavior and ecology ==
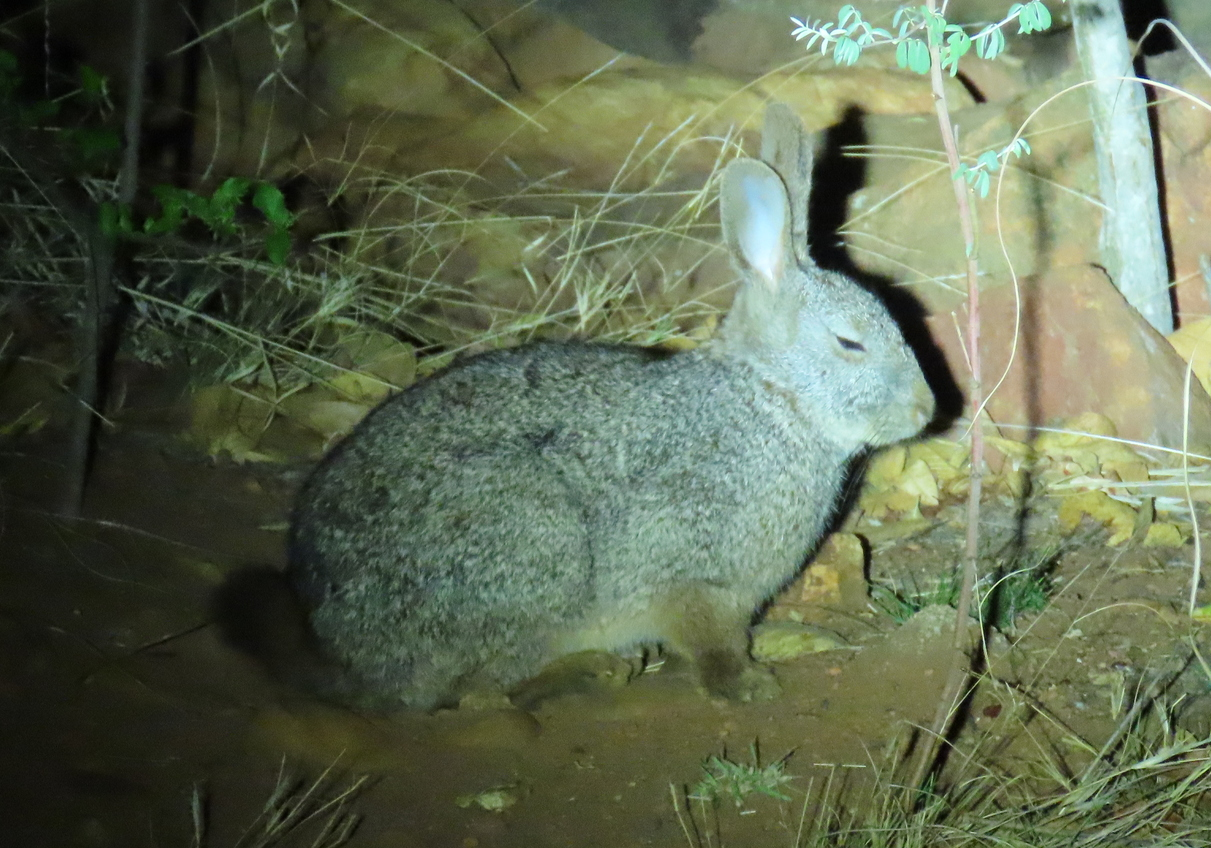
An individual in Blyde River Canyon Nature Reserve, South Africa

Primarily nocturnal, Pronolagus randensis remains in hiding during the day, though it will emerge in the early morning from shelter to bask in the sun. Unlike hyraxes, similarly sized mammals that share the same rocky habitat and frequently bask on exposed rocks, P. randensis remains hidden and does not use observation boulders.

P. randensis is solitary in its habits, although it is sometimes seen in groups when grazing. It also appears in groups consisting of a female, her young, and one to two males. An oestrus female is often followed by courting males.

Jameson's red rock hare is strictly nocturnal, foraging only at night when it is most active. It feeds on the vegetation in and around its habitat including grasses, and prefers eating fresh shoots following brush fires. If it cannot find grass within its rocky habitat, it will venture out into flat areas to forage, retreating back into rocky outcroppings afterwards or if startled. When disturbed, it will remain under cover until the last moment, at which point it flees behind nearby rocks. It avoids eating some plants, such as Croton gratissimus and Indigofera filipes, possibly due to the presence of hazardous compounds in the plants that present in the form of strongly aromatic leaves. Like other leporids, it consumes its own cecotropes. Flattened pellet-shaped droppings, characteristic of Pronolagus species, are deposited in middens. Known predators of Pronolagus randensis and red rock hares in general are Verreaux's eagle, Cape eagle-owls, and leopards.

=== Reproduction ===
Very little is known about the breeding habits of Pronolagus randensis. Based on behavior observed in Zimbabwe, it is assumed that breeding occurs year-round, with females giving birth to one to two young per litter. The species may line a nest with fur. The species has 42 diploid chromosomes, as do all red rock hares.

== Human interaction and impact ==
Jameson's red rock hare is listed as a least-concern species by the International Union for Conservation of Nature (IUCN). Its range includes several national parks and protected areas, such as Matobo National Park, where it benefits from conservation efforts. The species is protected in South Africa by nature conservation agencies through seasonal hunting regulations, as it is hunted for game and sport. The expansion of commercial plantations has contributed to habitat loss, and, as of 2019, the population of Pronolagus randensis appears to be decreasing.
