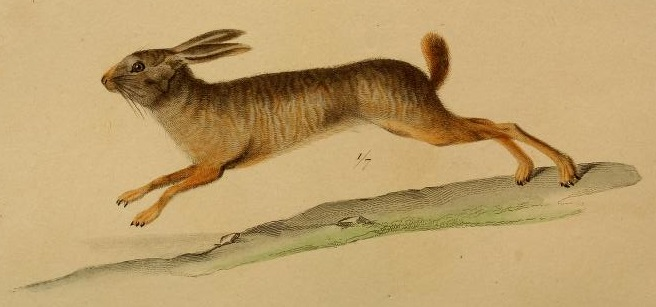
- Illustration of P. crassicaudatus from Geoffroy, 1832

Scientific classification
- Kingdom: Animalia
- Phylum: Chordata
- Class: Mammalia
- Order: Lagomorpha
- Family: Leporidae
- Genus: Pronolagus; Lyon, 1904

Type species
- Lepus crassicaudatus I. Geoffroy Saint-Hilaire, 1832

Species
- Pronolagus crassicaudatus; Pronolagus randensis; Pronolagus rupestris; Pronolagus saundersiae
- P. crassicaudatus range P. randensis range P. rupestris range P. saundersiae range

= Red rock hare =

Pronolagus Temporal range: Early Pliocene–Recent ~5.33–0 Ma

Genus of mammals

The red rock hares are the four species of rabbit in the genus Pronolagus. They are lagomorphs of the family Leporidae living in rocky habitats across Africa. Three species are restricted to Southern Africa, while one—Smith's red rock hare (P. rupestris)—is found as far north as Kenya. The red rock hares are rufous, dark brown, or reddish-brown-tailed rabbits that vary in size, with some shared physical characteristics being short ears and a lack of an interpareital bone. They have 42 chromosomes and are active during the night, feeding only on plants. Breeding results in litters of one to two altricial young.

The red rock hares have a varied taxonomic history. Initially described as members of the genus Lepus or Oryctolagus, the genus Pronolagus was proposed in 1904 to describe a skeleton of Pronolagus crassicaudatus, which was at that time labeled under the genus Lepus. This would become the type species of the red rock hare genus. Since then, of the currently accepted members, two new species have been described as members of Pronolagus—Jameson's red rock hare (P. randensis) and Hewitt's red rock hare (P. saundersiae, originally a subspecies of P. rupestris)—while the third, Smith's red rock hare, was described in 1834 as Lepus rupestris. Two extinct species have been proposed, but one is a nomen oblitum.

All members of Pronolagus are considered least-concern species by the International Union for Conservation of Nature (IUCN), but there are few conservation measures that apply to the red rock hares. Excepting Hewitt's red rock hare, there are seasonal hunting regulations that restrict hunting red rock hares, and various protected areas and national parks intersect the ranges of each species; however, the expansion of commercial plantations has led to habitat loss, and the population of red rock hares is expected to decrease.

== Taxonomy and evolution ==
Species in this genus had previously been classified in the genus Lepus, as done by J.E. Gray in 1867, or in Oryctolagus, as done by Charles Immanuel Forsyth Major in 1899. Various taxonomic interpretations have been applied to these species.

The genus Pronolagus was proposed by Marcus Ward Lyon, Jr. in 1904, based on a skeleton that had been labeled Lepus crassicaudatus I. Geoffroy, 1832. Lyon later acknowledged the work of Oldfield Thomas and Harold Schwann, which argued that particular specimen belonged to a species they named Pronolagus ruddi Thomas and Schwann 1905; he wrote that the type species "should stand as Pronolagus crassicaudatus Lyon (not Geoffroy) = Pronolagus ruddi Thomas and Schwann". P. ruddi is no longer regarded as its own species, but rather a subspecies of P. crassicaudatus.

In the 1950s, John Ellerman and Terence Morrison-Scott classified Poelagus as a subgenus of Pronolagus. B. G. Lundholm regarded Pronolagus randensis as a synonym of P. crassicaudatus. Neither of these classifications received much support.

Proposed species in this genus include:

- P. melanurus (Rüppell, 1834) (Now a synonym of P. rupestris)
- P. ruddi Thomas & Schwann, 1905 (Now a synonym or subspecies of P. crassicaudatus)
- †P. intermedius Jameson, 1909 (Nomen oblitum and unrecognized since at least 1939)
- P. caucinus Thomas, 1929 (Now a synonym or subspecies of P. randensis)
- P. whitei Roberts, 1938 (Now a synonym or subspecies of P. randensis)
- P. barretti Roberts, 1949 (Now a synonym of P. saundersiae)
- †P. humpatensis Sen and Pickford, 2022

=== Extant species ===
This genus contains the following species:

Image	Common name	Scientific name	Distribution
	Natal red rock hare	Pronolagus crassicaudatus (I. Geoffroy, 1832)	southeastern provinces of South Africa (Eastern Cape, Mpumalanga, and KwaZulu-Natal), eastern Lesotho, Swaziland (Highveld and Lumbobo), and southern Mozambique (Maputo Province)
	Jameson's red rock hare	Pronolagus randensis Jameson, 1907	Zimbabwe and Namibia, parts of South Africa, Angola, Botswana and Mozambique
	Smith's red rock hare	Pronolagus rupestris (A. Smith, 1834)	Kenya (Rift Valley), Lesotho, Malawi, Namibia, Rhodesia, South Africa (Northern Cape, Free State, and North West), Tanzania and Zambia
	Hewitt's red rock hare	Pronolagus saundersiae Hewitt, 1927 (previously included in Pronolagus rupestris)	South Africa, Eswatini and Lesotho

=== Fossils ===
A fossil skull of an animal in this genus was found in South Africa; Henry Lyster Jameson named the species Pronolagus intermedius (Note: Jameson's paper spelled the name of the new species as Ronolagus intermedius, but elsewhere described it as being in the genus Pronolagus.) as it was described as being intermediate between P. crassiacaudatus and P. ruddi. Future studies did not mention this fossil species at all, resulting in it becoming a nomen oblitum. Further investigation into the fossil record of Pronolagus has recognized the extinct species P. humpatensis from Angola's Humpata Plateau, a small red rock hare of size comparable to that of wild European rabbits or P. rupestris. This extinct species dates back to the early Pleistocene. Detailed study of the skeletal characteristics of Pronolagus was not undertaken until the 2020s, where it was noted that as of 2010, "none of the fossil Pronolagus material [had] been described". The study noted that the earliest appearances of the genus were in the early Pliocene, noted at Langebaanweg and Makapansgat. Documentation of the history of lagomorphs across the whole of Africa has been described as "poor", though fossils of three families are present there—Leporidae, Ochotonidae, and the extinct Prolagidae.

=== Phylogeny ===
All species in this genus have 21 pairs of chromosomes (2n = 42). The karyotype for P. rupestris has been published. The Pronolagus chromosomes have undergone four fusions and one fission from the Lagomorpha ancestral state (2n = 48), which resembles the karyotype of Lepus. The phylogenetic relationships between members of Pronolagus and the rest of the African leporids are described by the following cladogram, derived from work by Matthee et al., 2004:

Phylogeny of African lagomorphs and related taxa

- Rodents
- - Pikas
  - - - - Poelagus marjorita
        - - - - Pronolagus rupestris
              - Pronolagus saundersiae
            - Pronolagus randensis
          - Pronolagus crassicaudatus
      - Nesolagus
    - Other leporids, including Lepus and Bunolagus

Molecular genetic analysis places Poelagus as the sister group of Pronolagus, which aligns somewhat with the views of Ellerman and Morrison-Scott that the two genera were congeneric. Poelagus and Pronolagus are considered part of a clade with Nesolagus. These genera likely arose from an ancestral leporid arriving from Asia and spreading to various parts of Africa during the middle Miocene, with a specific vicariance event that separated Nesolagus from the other African leporids occurring 11.3 ± 1.53 million years ago.

Of the four species in Pronolagus, the Natal red rock hare is the most basal (closest to the base of the phylogenetic tree), followed by Jameson's red rock hare, Smith's red rock hare, and finally Hewitt's red rock hare. Studies in the 1990s discovered evidence of separate genetic lineages in P. rupestris, which led to the separation of P. saundersiae as a distinct species. These two species do not overlap in distribution, and can be distinguished by differences in skeletal morphology.

== Characteristics ==
The red rock hares are of varying size, but are readily distinguished from other leporids in Southern Africa by their reddish-brown to dark brown colored tail and short (63–109 mm (2.5–4.3 in)) ears. Their fur is grey near the head and reddish along the limbs. Some characteristics of animals in this genus include the lack of an interparietal bone in adults, a mesopterygoid space which is narrower than the minimal length of the hard palate, and the lack of a stripe along its jaw.

== Distribution and habitat ==
The varied and often disjunct distribution of the red rock hares has been attributed to the rocky habitat of the species within the genus, as they do not inhabit plains or forests. Red rock hares are found in rocky kopjes, hills and mountainsides where scrub and grass is available. They rarely venture far from this habitat.

== Behavior and ecology ==
Red rock hares are nocturnal, though Jameson's red rock hare has been observed sunning in the early morning. They are herbivorous and are particularly inclined to eating newly sprouted grasses that arise after a fire. Though red rock hares are generally solitary creatures, they have been observed in groups while grazing. Some species, such as Smith's red rock hare, produce sounds when distressed.

In regions where species are sympatric, as is the case in some parts of South Africa, individuals are separated by differing preferences in habitat altitude; Hewitt's red rock hare is generally found at higher altitudes with more rainfall than the other red rock hares, which prefer drier, lower locations.

Breeding seasons vary between species, and some populations of the Natal and Jameson's red rock hare appear to breed year-round. Pregnancies typically result in the production of 1 to 2 young per litter, which are born altricial. Nests are simple and are constructed at the base of shrubs in the rabbit's habitat.

=== Threats ===
The red rock hares are considered abundant throughout their ranges, but are threatened by habitat loss due to expanding commercial plantations. Predators of the red rock hares include carnivores, birds of prey and snakes, such as leopards, Verreaux's eagles, Cape eagle-owls, and pythons.

== Conservation ==
Excepting Hewitt's red rock hare, the newest species to be classified as part of Pronolagus, the red rock hares are protected by seasonal hunting regulations that restrict the periods in which these hares can be hunted. There are protected areas and national parks that incidentally intersect with the distributions of each species in Pronolagus. Estimates place the adult population of each species over 10,000, and the International Union for Conservation of Nature (IUCN) considers all four species to be of least concern, but notes that the populations of both the Natal red rock hare and Jameson's red rock hare are decreasing.
