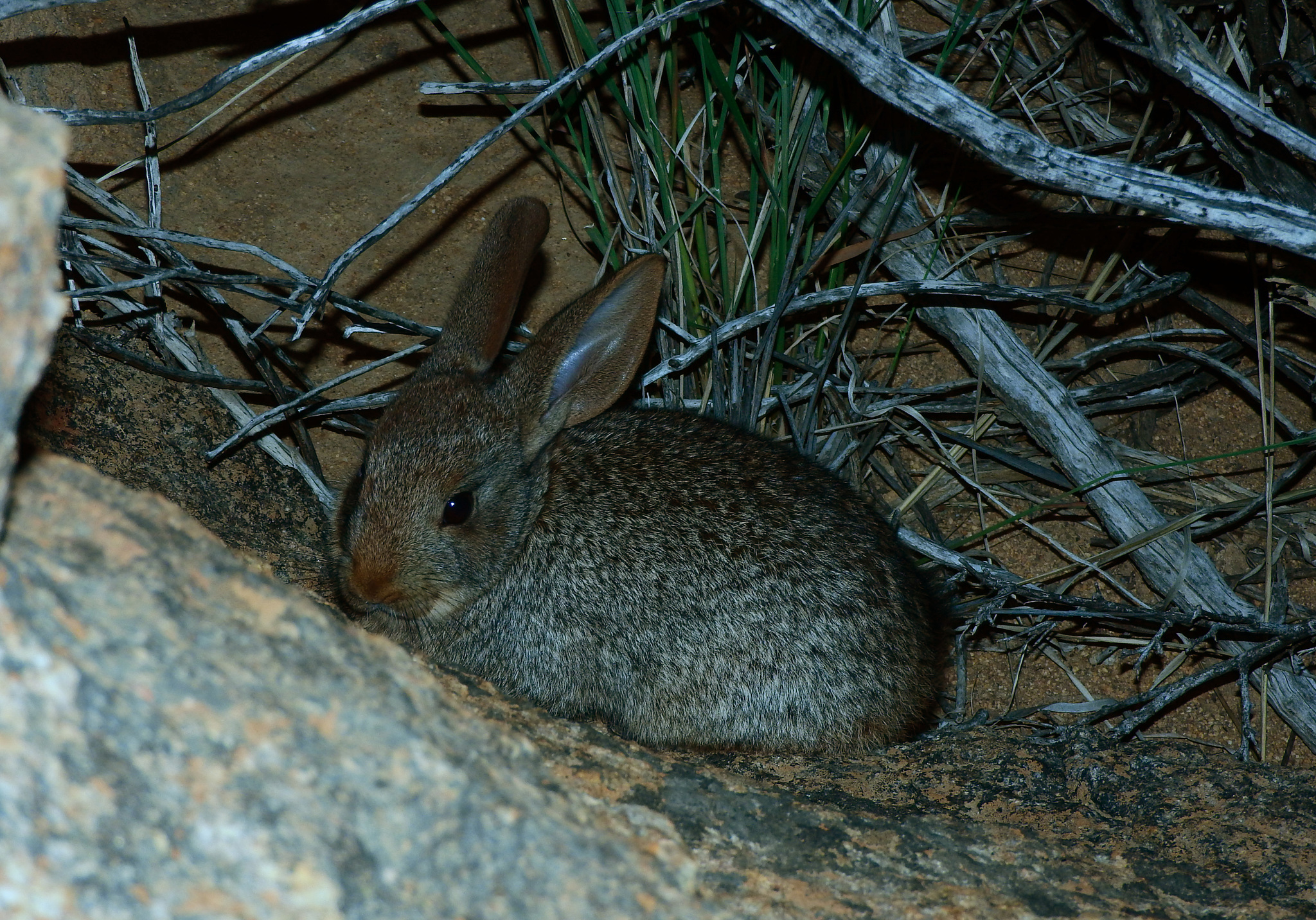

Conservation status
- Least Concern (IUCN 3.1)

Scientific classification
- Kingdom: Animalia
- Phylum: Chordata
- Class: Mammalia
- Order: Lagomorpha
- Family: Leporidae
- Genus: Pronolagus
- Species: P. rupestris

Binomial name
- Pronolagus rupestris (A. Smith, 1834)

Subspecies
- P. r. curryi Thomas, 1902; P. r. nyikae Thomas, 1902; P. r. rupestris Smith, 1834; P. r. saundersiae Hewitt, 1927; P. r. vallicola Kershaw, 1924
- P. rupestris range

Synonyms
- barretti Roberts, 1949; bowkeri Hewitt, 1927; australis Roberts, 1933; melanuris Ruppel, 1842; mulleri Roberts, 1938

= Smith's red rock hare =

Species of mammal

Smith's red rockhare, Smith's red rock hare or Smith's red rock rabbit (Pronolagus rupestris) is a species of mammal in the family Leporidae (rabbits and hares), and is the smallest member of the genus Pronolagus. The upperparts and gular collar are reddish brown in colour. It has warm, brown, grizzled, thicker hairs at the back of the body, and white to tawny, thinner underfur. It is native to Africa, found in parts of Kenya (Rift Valley), Lesotho, Malawi, Namibia, South Africa (Northern Cape, Free State, and North West), Tanzania, Zambia and Zimbabwe. It is a folivore, and usually forages on grasses (such as sprouting grass), shrubs and herbs. It breeds from September to February, and the female litters one or two offspring. The young leave the nest at three years of age. In 1996, it was rated as a species of least concern on the IUCN Red List of Endangered Species.

== Taxonomy ==
Scottish zoologist Andrew Smith first described the Smith's red rock hare in the year 1834. It was originally described in the genus Lepus, and was formerly included in Natal red rock hare (P. crassicaudatus). They are commonly known as rock rabbits in Zambia. In Swahili, its name is sungura mwekundu or kitengule.

The number of accepted subspecies has ranged from zero to eight. One classification from the 1940s accepted the following subspecies:

- P. r. rupestris (A. Smith, 1834)
- P. r. melanurus (Rüppell, 1842)
- P. r. nyikae (Thomas, 1902)
- P. r. curryi (Thomas, 1902)
- P. r. saundersiae Hewitt, 1927
- P. r. australis Roberts, 1933
- P. r. mulleri Roberts, 1938
- P. r. whitei Roberts, 1938
- P. r. barretti Roberts, 1949

Another classification from the 1980s had the following subspecies; differences came from moving whitei to P. randensis, including fitzsimonsi, and treating mulleri as a synonym of australis:

- P. r. rupestris (A. Smith, 1834)
- P. r. melanurus (Rüppell, 1842)
- P. r. curryi (Thomas, 1902)
- P. r. saundersiae Hewitt, 1927
- P. r. australis Roberts, 1933
- P. r. fitzsimonsi Roberts, 1938
- P. r. barbetti Roberts, 1949

In the third edition of Mammal Species of the World published in 2005, R. S. Hoffman and A. T. Smith listed Smith's red rock hare (Pronolagus rupestris) as a separate species and included five subspecies.

The taxonomic status of the east African Smith's red rock hare is uncertain. It is treated conspecific with the southern African P. rupestris. A paper looking at mitochondrial DNA argued that P. r. curryi is the only non-nominate subspecies. Mammals of Africa does not recognize any subspecies and rather that curryi, fitzsimonsi, melanurus, mülleri, nyikae, and vallicola are all just synonyms of P. rupestris.

== Description ==
The Smith's red rock hare is the smallest member of the genus Pronolagus, measuring 43 to 65 cm (17 to 26 in) in length from head to tail, having a 5 to 11 cm (2.0 to 4.3 in) long bushy, dark to reddish brown tail with a black tip, and weighing 1.3 to 2 kg (2.9 to 4.4 lb). The upperparts and gular collar are reddish brown in color. The ears are grey, measuring 6 to 10 cm (2.4 to 3.9 in) in length, and the hindfeet measure 7.5 to 10 cm (3.0 to 3.9 in) in length. It has a brownish forehead, with greyish buff cheeks. The sides of the face are gray, and the nuchal patch is reddish brown. It has pinkish buff coloured underparts, and some white in the mid-line of the abdomen. The hind legs and rump are bright reddish brown. It has warm, brown, grizzled, thicker hairs at the back of the body, and white to tawny, thinner underfur. The feet pads are covered by dense, greasy fur. The digits and claws are short and broad, and the limbs are russet, and the frontal bone measures almost the same as the snout. Possibly due to its diet, its flesh is aromatic.

It is similar to the Jameson's red rock hare (P. randensis) which has shorter ears and a longer tail, and the Hewitt's red rock hare (P. saundersiae) which has a shorter snout bone than the frontal bone. (The latter is regarded as P. r. saundersiae by some authorities.)

== Distribution and habitat ==
The Smith's red rock hare is native to Africa, found in parts of Kenya (Rift Valley), Lesotho, Malawi, eastern Zimbabwe, South Africa (Northern Cape, Free State, and North West), Tanzania, and Zambia. It occurs on rocky slopes and tops of rocky outcrops, in stony countries where grass, rocks, and bush are intermingled. It inhabits ravines with boulders, hillsides, slabs of stones, and rock creaks which provide cover from predators.

== Behaviour and ecology ==
While a nocturnal species, Smith's red rock hare occasionally comes out during early morning or late afternoon in places where it is not hunted. It is alert at most times, and usually hides prior to being seen. It can also exhibit rapid, startling manoeuvres which are depicted when chased by dogs. The Smith's red rock is observed to vocalize a series of loud, startling screams when running away at night, possibly to scare away predators or to warn other members of the species of potential threat. Despite not being restrained or in pain, it is known to produce shrill voices, contrary to most other leporids. The juvenile can produce churring sounds when caught in hand, and the adult can produce a barking sound when disturbed before sunrise.

It is a folivore, and usually forages on grasses (such as sprouting grass), shrubs, and herbs. The Smith's red rock hare breeds from September to February. The female makes a nest out of vegetable debris lined with its fur. The nest is about 15 centimetres (5.9 in) wide, 10 centimetres (3.9 in) length, and 4 to 8 cm (1.6 to 3.1 in) deep. The female has a gestation period of about one month, and litters one or two children, each weighing 40 to 50 g (1.4 to 1.8 oz). The young are altricial at birth, and leave the nest at three years of age, when they weigh about 180 to 200 g (6.3 to 7.1 oz). Although observed to be secluded, the Smith's red rock hare associate closely with dassies.

== Conservation ==
Since 1996, the Smith's red rock hare has been rated as a species of 'least concern' on the IUCN Red List of Endangered Species. This is because it is common in parts of its range in South Africa, has a large range—more than 20,000 square kilometres (7,700 sq mi)—and because its population numbers above 10,000 mature individuals in South Africa alone. Even though the state of the overall population is unclear, it is widespread, and characterized as abundant in Kuruman and Springbok. There is no data about the status of its east African range.

Hunting poses a threat to the species and, although not considered to be a severe threat, it is also adversely affected from habitat destruction due to the building of houses on rocky outcrops. Since the 1900s to 2000, more than 20% habitat loss has occurred, and if the habitat loss would have continued at this same rate till 2022, its population decline in South Africa was predicted in 2004 to become greater than 10%. It occurs in provincial parks, national parks, and wildlife refuges in South Africa, and is also protected as a game species by provincial nature conservation agencies, seasonally.

It occurs in Lavushi Manda National Park in Zambia.
