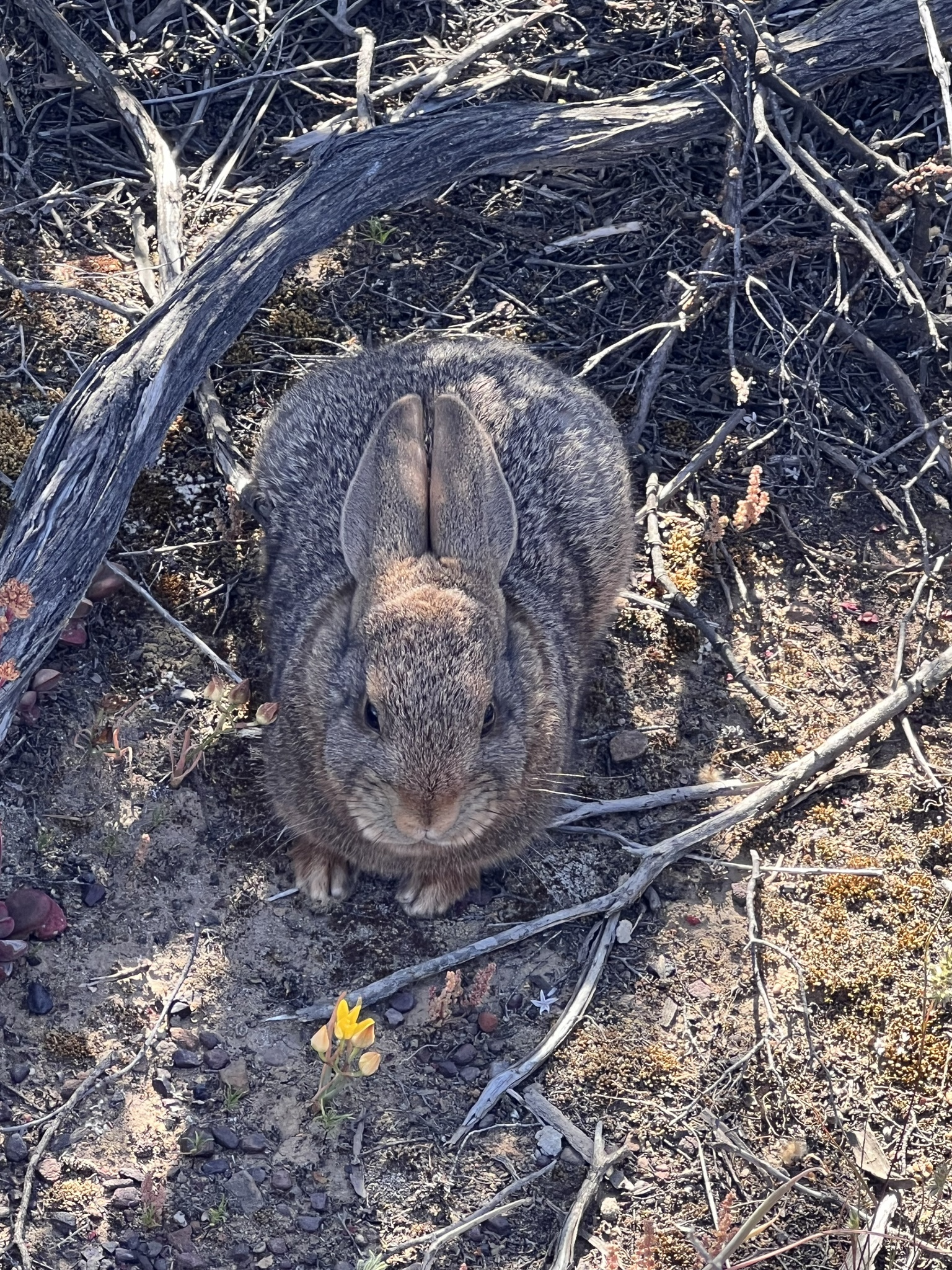
- P. saundersiae in Hantam, South Africa

Conservation status
- Least Concern (IUCN 3.1)

Scientific classification
- Kingdom: Animalia
- Phylum: Chordata
- Class: Mammalia
- Order: Lagomorpha
- Family: Leporidae
- Genus: Pronolagus
- Species: P. saundersiae

Binomial name
- Pronolagus saundersiae Hewitt, 1927
- P. saundersiae range

Synonyms
- Pronolagus barretti Roberts, 1949; Pronolagus bowkeri Hewitt, 1927; Pronolagus australis Roberts, 1933

= Hewitt's red rock hare =

Species of mammal

Hewitt's red rock hare (Pronolagus saundersiae) is a species of rabbit in the family Leporidae found in South Africa, Eswatini, and Lesotho. It is a medium-sized, densely furred rufous and brown rabbit that behaves similarly to other red rock hares, with a preference for higher elevated rocky habitats. Previously classified as a subspecies of Smith's red rock hare (Pronolagus rupestris), it is now regarded as its own species.

Like other red rock hares, P. saundersiae is nocturnal, and is presumed to feed on grasses, herbs, and shrubs. Its breeding patterns are also presumed to be similar to those of other red rock hares, with females producing three to four litters of altricial young each warm season. The species is predated upon by Verreaux's eagle, Cape eagle-owls, and leopards. It is considered a least-concern species by the International Union for Conservation of Nature (IUCN) and is said to be "abundant" throughout its range, despite not being protected by any specific conservation measures. As a result of habitat loss caused by humans, the global population is expected to decrease.

== Taxonomy ==
The Hewitt's red rock hare was named by John Hewitt (1880–1961), the director of the Albany Museum, South Africa. Hewitt originally described this taxon as a subspecies of Pronolagus crassicaudatus in his 1927 description. Its type locality was Grahamstown. He described this taxon based on skulls from Albany district, which were collected by Enid Saunders and Frank Bowker. The species was named after Saunders.

It is regarded as its own species due to differences in morphology (specifically having a snout bone shorter than its frontal bone, compared to Smith's red rock hare) and genetic differences in cytochrome b and 12S rRNA from other members of Pronolagus. It has been previously classified as a subspecies of Pronolagus rupestris by various zoologists, including Ellerman, Morrison-Scott and Hayman, as well as Hoffmann and Smith for the third edition of Mammal Species of the World. The two species are very closely related, diverging at an estimated date of 1.65 ± 0.69 million years ago.

=== Fossil record ===
Fossils of P. saundersiae are extremely sparse. Presence of its remains in archaeological studies are mentioned in lists of taxa found at a given site, but are never described or illustrated. It has specifically appeared in localities dating back to the Late Pleistocene, but further study is warranted to clarify its first appearance.

== Characteristics ==
P. saundersiae is a densely furred, medium-sized (1.35–2.05 kg (3.0–4.5 lb)) red rock hare that is largely brown with light rufous underparts and a sandy- to red-colored tail. Its sides are slightly lighter than its back in coloration, and its head is grayish-brown with grayish-white cheeks. The color of its fur varies by habitat.

In saundersiae, the wool hairs have slaty bases throughout head, body and tail, above and below: over the first half of the back these wool hairs show only a trace of rufous distally, are dark at the tip, and the bases are pale slate colour: but behind, near to the tail, the hairs become much longer and more deeply coloured, being slaty in the basal half and rufous in the distal half, the tips being blackish. On the tail, the wool hairs are slaty only at their bases. Longer hairs of back black over the greater portion of their length, a little paler basally, and with conspicuous white annulus near the tip.

— John Hewitt, On several new Rodents in the Albany Museum (Plates XXVI and XXVII), Records of the Albany Museum / Committee of the Albany Museum, [1914-1927]. Grahamstown, South Africa: Albany Museum. 3 (5): 434—435 —in Field Museum of Natural History Library.

Its adult head-body length measures between 380 and 535 mm (15.0 and 21.1 in), and tail length between 50 and 115 mm (2.0 and 4.5 in). The ear length measures 80–110 mm (3.1–4.3 in), and the hind foot 85–100 mm (3.3–3.9 in).

== Distribution and habitat ==
P. saundersiae is found in South Africa, Eswatini, and Lesotho. It specifically occurs in the South African provinces of Western Cape, Eastern Cape, Free State, and KwaZulu-Natal, as well as the western half of Eswatini and the entirety of Lesotho. Its range overlaps with that of Jameson's red rock hare in some regions, where the two species' habitats differ in elevation and rainfall, and the Natal red rock hare in others, where the two species are sympatric.

Its habitat is similar to that of other red rock hares. It occupies rocky escarpments, hillsides and kopjes, residing in particular on the tops of rocky outcroppings and in higher elevations in general. The tendency of P. saundersiae towards higher elevations in its habitat contributes towards its separation from other red rock hares in areas of overlapping distribution. Other regions P. saundersiae are found include elevated grassland and shrubland.

== Behavior and ecology ==
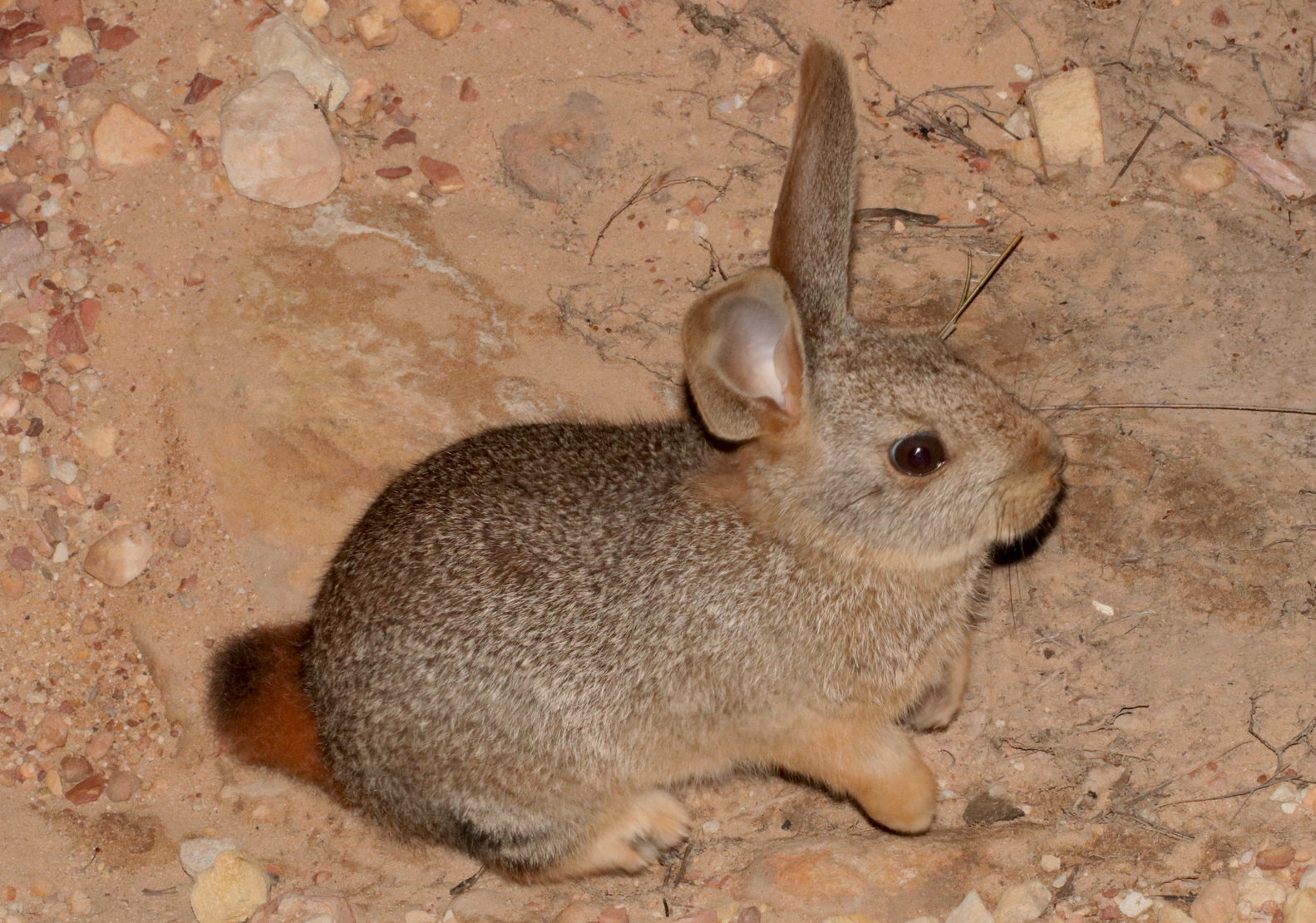
Juvenile in Central Karoo

P. saundersiae is presumed to behave similarly to Smith's red rock hare—a nocturnal forager that shelters under boulders and in crevices. It is likely a folivore, preferring to eat grasses, herbs and shrubs. Known predators of P. saundersiae and red rock hares in general are Verreaux's eagle, Cape eagle-owls, and leopards.

Breeding takes place during the warm season, in which a female produces three to four litters, each yielding one to two young born altricial.

== Threats and interactions with humans ==
The population of P. saundersiae was estimated to be over 10,000 mature individuals in 2004, and the species has been said to be "abundant" throughout its range. However, there are several threats to the species, of which many are anthropogenic. The main anthropogenic impact to the species is habitat loss caused by the ongoing expansion of commercial plantations, which has been ongoing for at least 100 years as of 2016. The expansion is expected to cause a decrease of less than 20% of the species' available habitat over the period of 2016 to 2036, which will cause a decline in the global population.

=== Conservation ===
P. saundersiae is listed as a species of least concern by the International Union for Conservation of Nature (IUCN). No specific conservation measures have been taken, though the species does occur in at least one protected area.
