= Brachylagus =

Brachylagus Temporal range: Early Pleistocene - Mid Pleistocene

Scientific classification
- Kingdom: Animalia
- Phylum: Chordata
- Class: Mammalia
- Order: Lagomorpha
- Family: Leporidae
- Genus: Brachylagus; Miller, 1900

Type species
- Lepus idahoensis (Merriam, 1891)

Species
- †Brachylagus coloradoensis

Genus of mammals

Brachylagus (/brækilæɡəs/) is a genus of lagomorph that contained the smallest living leporid, the pygmy rabbit before it was reclassified as a member of Sylvilagus in 2022. The genus name was originally proposed by Gerrit Smith Miller Jr. in 1900 as a subgenus for the pygmy rabbit, as it then had the scientific name Lepus idahoensis, but its characteristics differed greatly from the known subgenera of the time. Marcus Ward Lyon Jr. elevated the subgenus to genus level in 1904. One extinct species, Brachylagus coloradoensis, is known to belong to the genus.

== Habitat ==
Pygmy rabbits are small lagomorphs that are endemic to mature sagebrush habitats. They are identified as the smallest member of the leporid family in North America. The Habitat selection studies have shown that human practices have impacted a lot of wildlife habitats. The mature sagebrush is a habitat for a lot of pygmy rabbits during every phase of their life; it is a place for both food and shelter for them. The Pygmy rabbits live in the burrow for shelter. Surprisingly, there are only 2 rabbits left in North America, which are known to evacuate their own burrows and also require suitable soil conditions. There are several factors that have led to the decline in the size of the population of the Pygmy Rabbit. These factors are intensive fire, invasive species, overgrazing, and energy development. One study has demonstrated that out of 77 sampled habitats at the occupied and unoccupied sites in Utah. The results showed that the occupied sites had greater horizontal and vertical presence of sagebrush, which is also present in greater amounts compared to the unoccupied habitat sites.

== Mortality ==
According to scientists, in comparison to the large leporids, the small pygmy rabbits are less swift to hide when the avian predators stand under the dense big sagebrush. The carnivorous and raptors are predators, and the pygmy rabbit, weasels, bobcats, red foxes, and many more are their prey. The researchers aimed to determine the longevity of the pygmy rabbits and investigate the causes of their mortality. Therefore, they caught 298 pygmy rabbits; every rabbit had a radio transmitter attached to it, allowing the scientists to track them. The findings showed that the survival rate of the pygmy rabbits was really low. The mortality rate of the Adult rabbits was 88.6% and the survival rate of the young rabbits was 89.4%. Some of the causes of their death were being eaten by the predators, Such as coyotes, which killed 19.6% of the rabbits, and hawks and owls, killing 18.5% of the rabbits. Weasels killed around 9.8% of the pygmy rabbits.

== Genetic experiments ==
The researchers at Washington State University crossed-bred the pure Columbian pygmy rabbits with pygmy rabbits from Idaho. They were trying to understand the genetic effects on the mating success and growth of the pygmy rabbits. The findings suggested that the Columbian Basin pygmy rabbits had a low survival and growth rate. The cross-breeding had improved their reproduction and survival rate.
