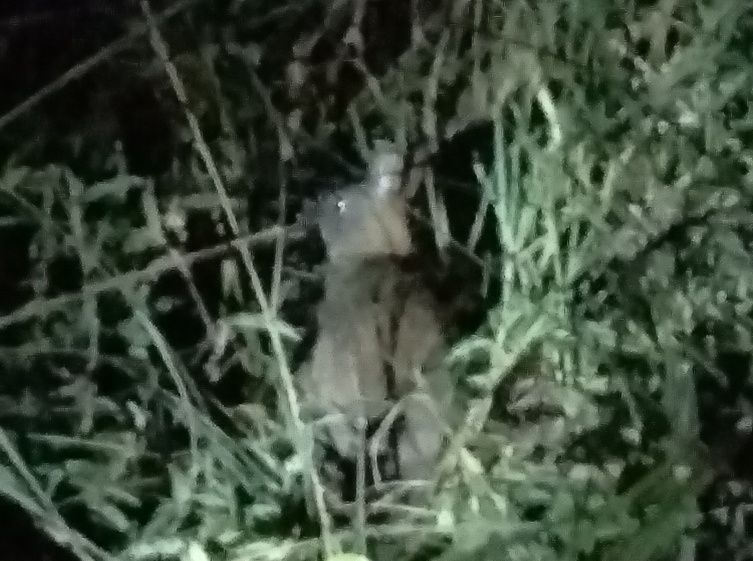
- Pakwach, Uganda

Conservation status
- Least Concern (IUCN 3.1)

Scientific classification
- Kingdom: Animalia
- Phylum: Chordata
- Class: Mammalia
- Order: Lagomorpha
- Family: Leporidae
- Genus: Poelagus; St. Leger, 1932
- Species: P. marjorita

Binomial name
- Poelagus marjorita (St. Leger, 1929)
- Bunyoro rabbit range Extant (resident) Presence uncertain

Synonyms
- Poelagus marjorita larkeni St. Leger, 1935; Poelagus marjorita oweni Setzer, 1956

= Bunyoro rabbit =

Species of rabbit

The Bunyoro rabbit or Uganda grass hare (Poelagus marjorita) is a species of mammal in the family Leporidae. It is the only member of the genus Poelagus. It is a medium-sized (400 to 605 millimetres (15.7 to 23.8 in) long), greyish-brown furred, nocturnal, plant-eating rabbit found in central Africa. Its typical habitat is damp savannah, often with rocky outcrops, but it also appears in forests and in rocky areas alongside rock hyraxes.

First described by British mammalogist Jane St. Leger in 1929 as a member of the hares, the Bunyoro rabbit was placed within its own genus in 1932 after specimens were examined in detail with relation to other leporids. Two subspecies from what is now South Sudan were described in the following decades, but neither is recognized today. The Bunyoro rabbit's genetic relationships have been variously described; most place it as closely related to the red rock hares (Pronolagus) and the striped rabbits (Nesolagus), but at least one study describes it as a sister group of the riverine rabbit (Bunolagus). While the Bunyoro rabbit was once considered abundant, and it is classified by the International Union for Conservation of Nature (IUCN) as a least-concern species, sightings have been infrequent, and its distribution is much more limited than early estimations.

== Taxonomy and evolution ==
The Bunyoro rabbit was first properly described in 1929 as Lepus marjorita or the "grass hare" by Jane St. Leger, a British mammalogist who worked with Oldfield Thomas. Four years earlier, it was misidentified by Geoffrey Douglas Hale Carpenter, who discovered a colony of the species and assumed them to be the feral descendants of European rabbits introduced to the region by Emin Pasha. The original description of the rabbit was from a specimen that was part of a collection of mammals sent to the British Museum from the Protectorate of Uganda by Charles Pitman, the game warden. The type locality of the original specimen is "Near Masindi, Bunyoro, Uganda" at an elevation of 4,000 feet (1,200 m). This species was described as "common on the roads at night", "strongly resembl[ing] the Indian Caprolagus", and of "unusually crisp fur" and "short ears". After receiving and reviewing additional specimens, and noting the species' skeletal characteristics, which resembled those of species in multiple genera—Lepus, Oryctolagus, Sylvilagus, and Pronolagus—St. Leger described the Bunyoro rabbit as belonging to a new monotypic genus, Poëlagus, in 1932. The name was later corrected to Poelagus, removing the diaeresis. Of the known leporids of Africa, Poelagus has been the most recently described.

The Bunyoro rabbit is named after its type locality, part of the Bunyoro kingdom. The common name "Uganda grass hare" references Cenchrus purpureus, a native species of plant known as Uganda grass, among other names. The generic name, Poelagus, references the epithet "grass hare", using the Greek póa (πόα), "grass", and lagós (λαγός), "hare". The specific name, marjorita, is named for Marjorie Pitman, Charles Pitman's wife.

There were two proposed subspecies of Poelagus marjorita, but neither is recognized and both are treated as synonyms of the species. Both of the proposed subspecies were described from what is now South Sudan, and displayed small differences in fur colour and skull morphology.

- Poelagus marjorita larkeni St. Leger, 1935, originally a subspecies with a type locality of Yambio in what was Anglo-Egyptian Sudan
- Poelagus marjorita oweni Setzer, 1956, originally a subspecies with a type locality of Lotti Forest in the Imatong Mountains of southern Sudan

=== Phylogeny ===
The Bunyoro rabbit's closest phylogenetic relations appear to be with the red rock hares (Pronolagus). Poelagus and Pronolagus were once thought to be congeneric, but are now considered part of a clade with Nesolagus. These genera likely arose from an ancestral leporid arriving from Asia and spreading to various parts of Africa during the middle Miocene, with a specific vicariance event that separated Nesolagus from the other African leporids occurring 11.3 ± 1.53 million years ago. However, a 2022 study of the phylogenetic relationships between mammals using ultraconserved elements in museum specimens found only distant relationships between Poelagus, Pronolagus and Nesolagus, and placed the riverine rabbit (Bunolagus) as the Bunyoro rabbit's sister clade. No fossils of Poelagus are known.

The phylogenetic relationships between the African leporids are described by the following cladogram, derived from work by Matthee et al., 2004. These relationships are supported by later analysis by Iraçabal et al., 2024:

Phylogeny of African lagomorphs and related taxa

- Rodents
- - Pikas
  - - - - Poelagus marjorita
        - Pronolagus
      - Nesolagus
    - Other leporids, including Lepus and Bunolagus

== Description ==
External image
- Photograph of a Bunyoro rabbit in Nwoya, Uganda

Poelagus marjorita has a head and body length of about 400 to 605 millimetres (15.7 to 23.8 in) and a weight of 2.26 to 3.17 kilograms (5.0 to 7.0 lb). Both the hind legs and ears are shorter than in other African species, and the coat is coarser. The general body colour is greyish-brown and the tail is yellowish above and white beneath. From the chest to the lower abdomen, a white stripe is visible that widens as it progresses downwards towards the hind limbs. Fur under the body, chin and throat is white, the soles of the feet are covered in whitish to grey fur, and the ear colour is similar to that of the rabbit's back. Rufous fur can be seen on the nuchal patch between the ears down to the base of the neck. The tail size ranges from 38 to 70 millimetres (1.5 to 2.8 in), the hind foot from 65 to 108 millimetres (2.6 to 4.3 in), and the ears from 61 to 70 millimetres (2.4 to 2.8 in).

The Bunyoro rabbit has morphological features that resemble both rabbits and hares. In regions where P. marjorita is present alongside other leporids, such as the African savannah hare (Lepus victoriae) and the Cape hare (Lepus capensis), the rabbit can be distinguished by the length of its ears, which are always shorter than the hind feet. Referring to the Bunyoro rabbit's skeletal morphology, its hard palate is longer than that of sympatric hares, even at the minimum length, and the zygomatic bone has external projections on the anterior side. The principal upper incisors have a single groove and lack cement.

== Distribution and habitat ==
The Bunyoro rabbit is native to Central Africa. Its range was once thought to extend from southern Chad and South Sudan to northeastern Democratic Republic of the Congo and western Kenya as far south as the northern end of Lake Tanganyika, with a separate population in Angola. However, later reviews of the known records and specimens determined that the species has a disjunct distribution, with four isolated populations that occur in Uganda, South Sudan, northeastern Democratic Republic of the Congo, and eastern Central African Republic. Several museum specimens were collected near Gabela, Angola in 1941, but their identity requires further verification to confirm if the rabbit is truly endemic there.

It occurs in various habitats: stony outcrops, woodland savannah, and hilly regions with short grasses. They may also reside in the forests of South Sudan. It may be found alongside trees in the genus Isoberlinia, and is often associated with rock hyraxes, sometimes sharing the same rock crevices.

== Behaviour and ecology ==
The Bunyoro rabbit is nocturnal, hiding alone during the day in a form (a shallow depression in the ground) among dense vegetation or a hole among rocks, and coming out to feed as part of a group at night. Its diet consists of grasses and flowering plants. It prefers the succulent young shoots that sprout from the ground after land has been cleared or burned, and tends towards pastures that are already grazed by larger mammals. When living in proximity to cultivated land, it feeds on rice and peanut plants. Predators that feed on the Bunyoro rabbit probably include hawks, owls, servals, cape genets and servaline genets. In regions where its range overlaps with that of hares, there is no physical aggression or otherwise antagonistic behaviour between rabbit and hare species.

=== Reproduction ===
Breeding seems to occur at any time of year, as indicated by records of newborn and juvenile rabbits in January, February, March, May, June, August, and October. The young are altricial, and are born covered by sparse, short hairs. The gestation period is about five weeks and one or two young are born in a breeding hole, the entrance of which is loosely blocked with soil or grass.

== Conservation ==
The population trend of the Bunyoro rabbit is believed to be stable and it is common in some parts of its range. The animal is hunted in Uganda using dogs and nets, and while it occurs in some protected areas, such as Garamba National Park, there are no particular protective measures that apply to the species. Some concerns have been raised over its limited distribution and the rarity of sightings compared with those in the early and mid-twentieth century. The International Union for Conservation of Nature (IUCN), in its Red List of Endangered Species, lists it as a least-concern species, but notes that its population may be decreasing.
