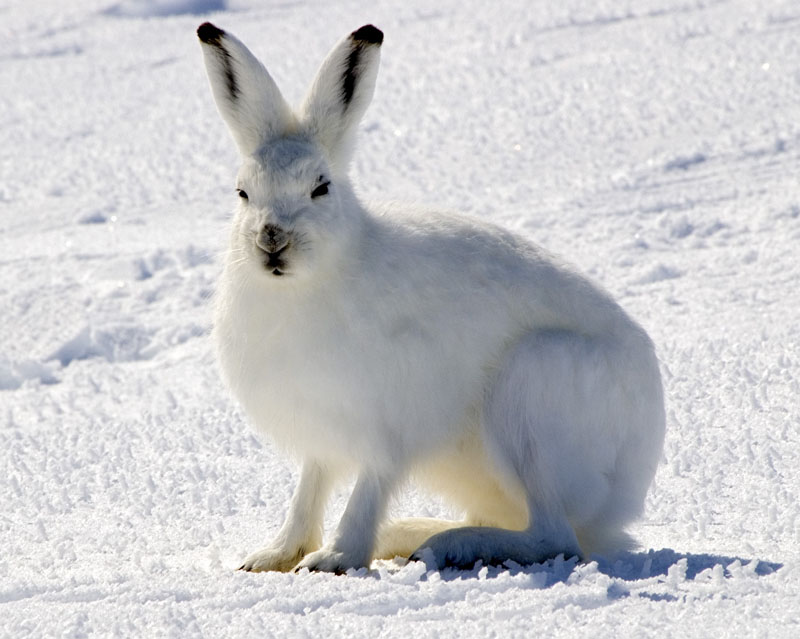
- Arctic hare (Lepus arcticus)

Scientific classification
- Kingdom: Animalia
- Phylum: Chordata
- Class: Mammalia
- Order: Lagomorpha
- Family: Leporidae; Fischer de Waldheim, 1817

Type genus
- Lepus Linnaeus, 1758

Genera
- Pentalagus; Bunolagus; Nesolagus; Romerolagus; Brachylagus; Sylvilagus; Oryctolagus; Poelagus; Caprolagus; Pronolagus; Lepus †Aztlanolagus †Nuralagus
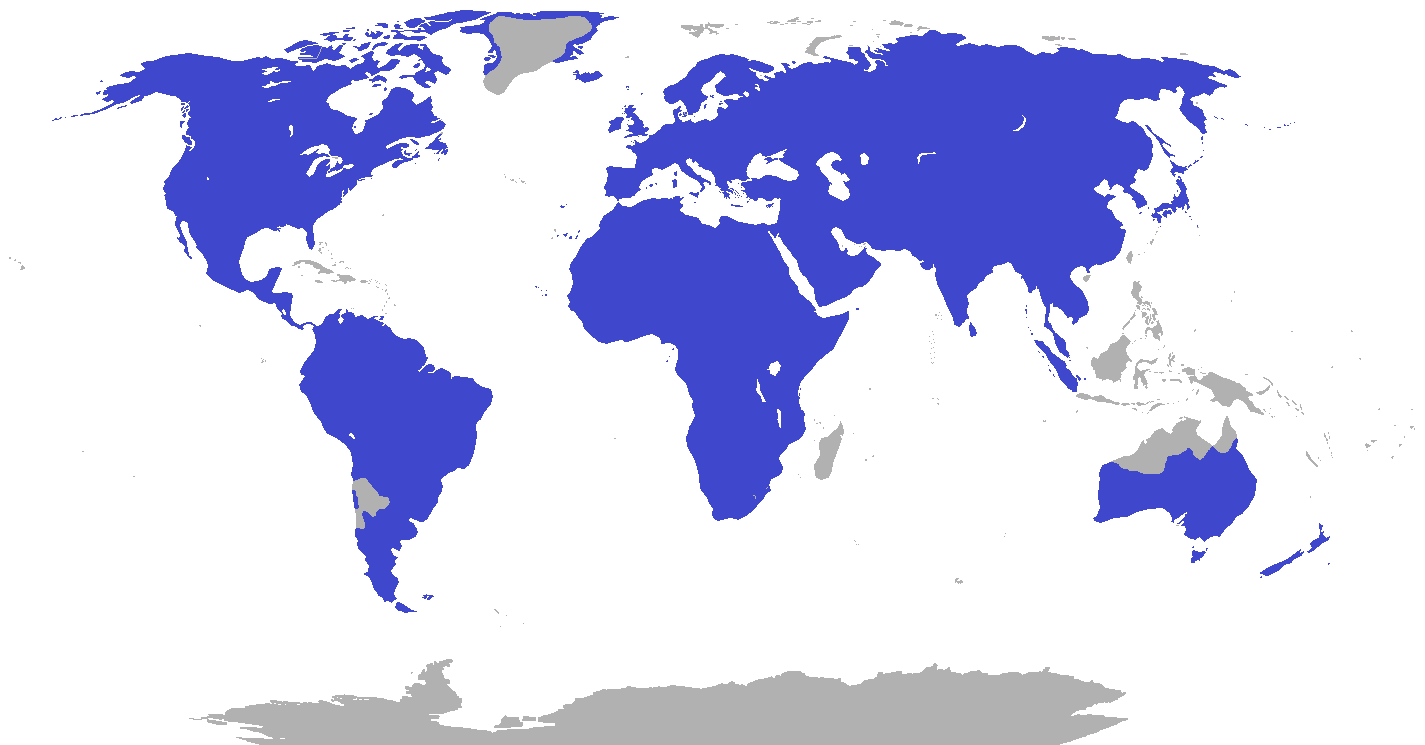
- Lagomorpha/Leporidae distribution

= Leporidae =

Rabbits and hares Temporal range: 53–0 Ma Eocene-Holocene

Family of lagomorphs

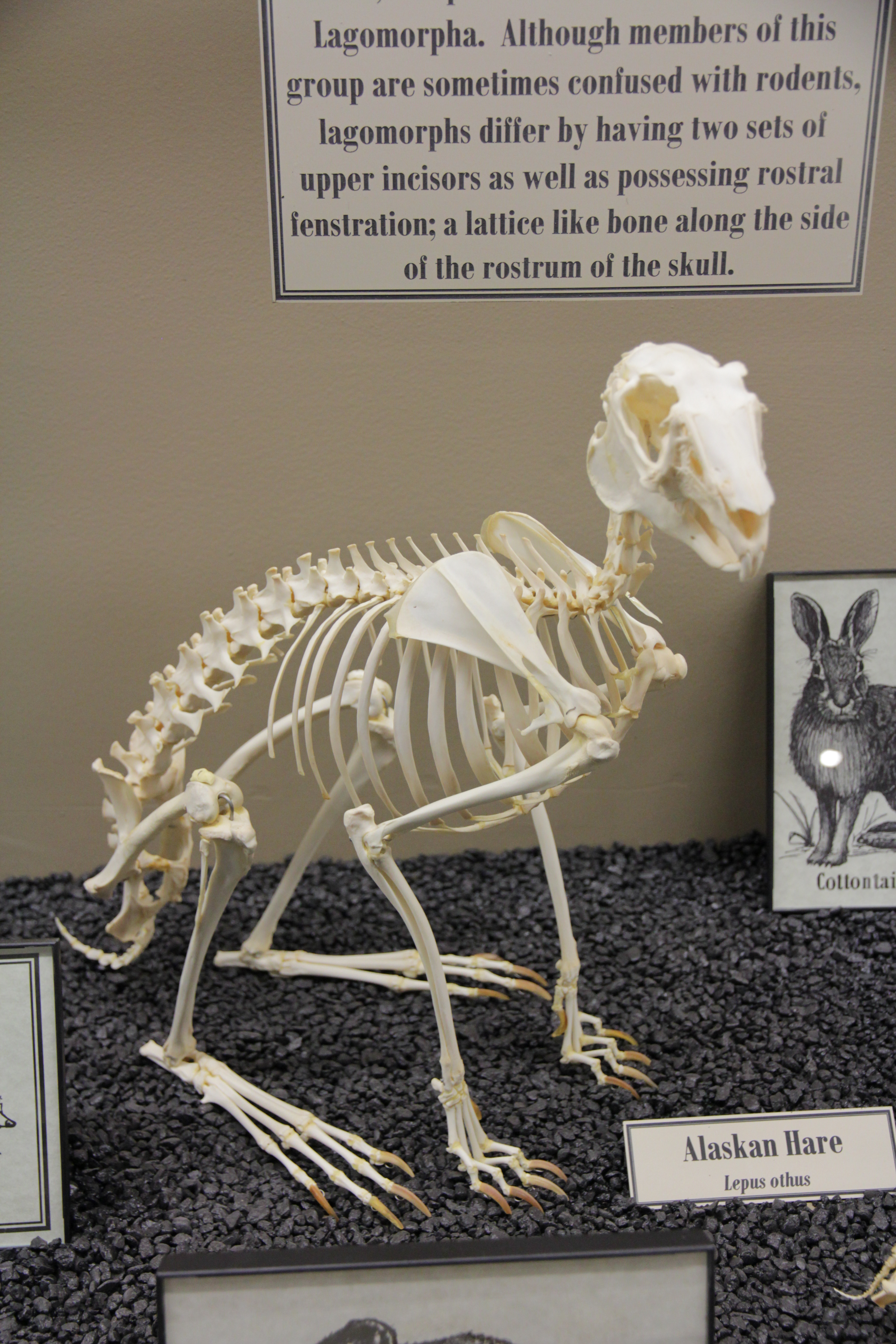
Skeleton of Alaskan hare on display at the Museum of Osteology

Leporidae (/ləˈpɔːrɪdiː, -daɪ/) is the family of rabbits and hares (Lepus), containing over 70 species of extant mammals in all. Together with the pikas, the Leporidae constitute the mammalian order Lagomorpha. Leporidae differ from pikas in that they have short, furry tails and elongated ears and hind legs.

The common name rabbit usually applies to all genera in the family except Lepus, while members of the genus Lepus (comprising nearly half the species) are usually called hares. Like most common names, however, the distinction does not match current taxonomy completely; jackrabbits are members of Lepus, and members of the genera Pronolagus and Caprolagus are called red rock hares and hispid hares respectively.

Various countries across all continents except Antarctica and Australia have indigenous species of Leporidae. Furthermore, the European rabbit, Oryctolagus cuniculus, and the European hare, Lepus europaeus, have been introduced to Australia and to many other islands, where they pose serious ecological and commercial threats due to their adaptability and lack of natural predators.

== Description ==
Leporids are small to moderately sized mammals, adapted for rapid movement. They have long hind legs, with four toes on each foot, and shorter fore legs, with five toes each. The soles of their feet are hairy, to improve grip while running, and they have strong claws on all of their toes. Leporids also have distinctive, elongated and mobile ears, and they have an excellent sense of hearing. Their eyes are large, and their night vision is good, reflecting their primarily nocturnal or crepuscular mode of living. Most have soft, woolly fur, though some like the hispid hare have more coarse hair. Their short tails are often rather fluffy. The noses of leporids are characterized by a Y-shaped groove that rises up from the upper lip and sensory pads at the entrance of each nostril.

Leporids are all roughly the same shape and fall within a small range of sizes with short tails, ranging in overall length from the 21 cm (8 in) long Tres Marias cottontail to the 76 cm (30 in) long desert hare. Female leporids are almost always larger than males, which is unusual among terrestrial mammals. It has been noted that the humerus bones of all leporids are extremely similar; their skulls, however, vary greatly between species, besides being notably arched with prominent brow ridges.

The dental formula of leporids is 2.0.3.31.0.2.3 = 28, meaning that they have two pairs of upper and one pair of lower incisors, no canines, three upper and two lower premolars on each side, and three upper and lower molars on either side of the jaw. Many leporids are classified by the characteristics of their teeth, and dental fossils, particularly the third upper premolar ("p3"), are often invaluable in identifying species. The Amami rabbit is unique among the leporids in that its generic name, Pentalagus, is derived from the fact that it is often found without its third upper molar, thus having 5 (penta-) total molars.

== Distribution, ecology, and behavior ==
=== Diet ===
Both rabbits and hares are almost exclusively herbivorous, although some hare species are known to eat carrion, and some leporids will eat fungi as well. Leporids feed primarily on grasses and herbs, although they also eat leaves, fruit, and seeds of various kinds. Easily digestible food is processed in the gastrointestinal tract and expelled as regular feces. In order to get nutrients out of hard to digest fiber, leporids ferment fiber in the cecum (in the GI tract) and then expel the contents as cecotropes, which are reingested (in a process known as cecotrophy). The cecotropes are then absorbed in the small intestine to utilize the nutrients, and the undigestible portion is expelled as pellets that are not eaten. This process is comparable to the cud-chewing behavior of ruminants.

=== Distribution ===
Leporids are found worldwide and have adapted to a remarkable range of habitats, from desert to tundra, forests, mountains, and swampland. Some rabbits dig burrows for shelter, the exact form of which varies between species. Other rabbits do not dig burrows but use forms, usually under a bush. Hares rarely dig shelters of any kind, instead using forms, and their bodies are more suited to fast running than to burrowing.

The adapatability of leporids has led to some species becoming invasive species upon introduction to exotic regions. Twelve species have been introduced outside of their native range, and three are considered to be invasive: the European rabbit, the European hare, and the eastern cottontail. The introduction of the European rabbit and European hare to Australia and remote islands is a major factor in the leporids' global distribution.

=== Ecology ===
Rabbits are near the bottom of the food chain in many ecosystems, being prey for a wide array of predators. These include weasels, birds of prey, snakes, dogs, coyotes, feral cats, and many other carnivores. Some wild cats, such as the Iberian lynx, are specialists, relying heavily on native rabbit populations for their food. Hares, too, have many predators, and rarely live past one year of age in the wild, though they have a potential lifespan of up to 12 years. Leporids, wherever they are found, inevitably end up as part of human diets as well, being considered as bushmeat.

=== Reproduction ===
Leporids are typically polygynandrous, and some have highly developed social systems. Their social hierarchies determine which males mate. Rabbits are induced ovulators (ovulate during mating). Species nesting below ground tend to have lower predation rates and have larger litters.

The gestation period in leporids varies from around 28 to 50 days, and is generally longer in the hares. This is in part because young hares (called leverets) are born precocial (eyes and ears open, fully furred), while young rabbits (called kits) are born altricial (eyes and ears closed, no fur). Higher latitudes correspond to shorter gestation periods. Leporids can have several litters a year, which can cause their population to expand dramatically in a short time when resources are plentiful. Gestation period and litter size correspond to predation rates as well.

== Evolution ==
The oldest known leporid species date from the late Eocene, by which time the family was already present in both North America and Asia. Over the course of their evolution, this group has become increasingly adapted to lives of fast running and leaping. For example, Palaeolagus, an extinct rabbit from the Oligocene of North America, had shorter hind legs than modern forms (indicating it ran rather than hopped) though it was in most other respects quite rabbit-like. The last common ancestor of the leporids likely had features not present in the last common ancestor of the lagomorphs, according to a 2022 study of the extant and extinct known lagomorphs—an intercranial joint and a facial tilt, specifically. Two as yet unnamed fossil finds—dated ~48 Ma (48 million yr) ago (from China) and ~53 Ma (53 million yr) ago (India)—while primitive, display the characteristic leporid ankle, thus pushing the divergence of Ochotonidae and Leporidae yet further into the past.

The following cladogram is based on work done by Matthee and colleagues in 2004 and clarifications from Abrantes and colleagues in 2011, and is based on nuclear and mitochondrial gene analysis:

- Leporidae
  - - Nesolagus (striped rabbits)
    - - Poelagus (Bunyoro rabbit)
      - Pronolagus (red rock hares)
  - - Romerolagus (volcano rabbit)
    - - - - - Sylvilagus (cottontails)
            - Brachylagus (pygmy rabbit)
          - - - - Bunolagus (riverine rabbit)
                - Oryctolagus (European rabbit)
              - Caprolagus (hispid hare)
            - Pentalagus (Amami rabbit)
      - Lepus (hares)

== Taxonomy ==
Family Leporidae (rabbits and hares):

- Genus Pentalagus
  - Amami rabbit, Pentalagus furnessi
- Genus Bunolagus
  - Riverine rabbit, Bunolagus monticularis
- Genus Nesolagus
  - Sumatran striped rabbit, Nesolagus netscheri
  - Annamite striped rabbit, Nesolagus timminsi
- Genus Romerolagus
  - Volcano rabbit, Romerolagus diazi
- Genus Brachylagus
  - Pygmy rabbit, Brachylagus idahoensis
- Genus Sylvilagus
  - Subgenus Tapeti
    - Swamp rabbit, Sylvilagus aquaticus
    - Andean tapeti, Sylvilagus andinus
    - Bogota tapeti, Sylvilagus apollinaris
    - Common tapeti, Sylvilagus brasiliensis
    - Dice's cottontail, Sylvilagus dicei
    - Central American tapeti, Sylvilagus gabbi
    - Northern tapeti, Sylvilagus incitatus
    - Omilteme cottontail, Sylvilagus insonus
    - Marsh rabbit, Sylvilagus palustris
    - Suriname tapeti, Sylvilagus parentum
    - Santa Marta tapeti, Sylvilagus sanctaemartae
    - Coastal tapeti, Sylvilagus tapetillus
    - Venezuelan lowland rabbit, Sylvilagus varynaensis
  - Subgenus Sylvilagus
    - Desert cottontail, Sylvilagus audubonii
    - Mexican cottontail, Sylvilagus cunicularis
    - Eastern cottontail, Sylvilagus floridanus
    - Tres Marias cottontail, Sylvilagus graysoni
    - Robust cottontail, Sylvilagus holzneri
    - Mountain cottontail, Sylvilagus nuttallii
    - Appalachian cottontail, Sylvilagus obscurus
    - New England cottontail, Sylvilagus transitionalis
  - Subgenus Microlagus
    - Brush rabbit, Sylvilagus bachmani
- Genus Oryctolagus
  - European rabbit, Oryctolagus cuniculus
- Genus Poelagus
  - Bunyoro rabbit, Poelagus marjorita
- Genus Pronolagus
  - Natal red rock hare, Pronolagus crassicaudatus
  - Jameson's red rock hare, Pronolagus randensis
  - Smith's red rock hare, Pronolagus rupestris
  - Hewitt's red rock hare, Pronolagus saundersiae
- Genus Caprolagus
  - Hispid hare, Caprolagus hispidus
- Genus Lepus
  - Subgenus Macrotolagus
    - Antelope jackrabbit, Lepus alleni
  - Subgenus Poecilolagus
    - Snowshoe hare, Lepus americanus
  - Subgenus Lepus
    - Arctic hare, Lepus arcticus
    - Alaskan hare, Lepus othus
    - Mountain hare, Lepus timidus
  - Subgenus Proeulagus
    - Black jackrabbit, Lepus insularis
    - Desert hare, Lepus tibetanus
    - Tolai hare, Lepus tolai
  - Subgenus Eulagos
    - Broom hare, Lepus castroviejoi
    - Yunnan hare, Lepus comus
    - Korean hare, Lepus coreanus
    - European hare, Lepus europaeus
    - Manchurian hare, Lepus mandshuricus
    - Ethiopian highland hare, Lepus starcki
  - Subgenus Sabanalagus
    - Ethiopian hare, Lepus fagani
    - African savanna hare, Lepus victoriae
  - Subgenus Indolagus
    - Hainan hare, Lepus hainanus
    - Indian hare, Lepus nigricollis
    - Burmese hare, Lepus peguensis
  - Subgenus Sinolagus
    - Chinese hare, Lepus sinensis
  - Subgenus Tarimolagus
    - Yarkand hare, Lepus yarkandensis
  - Incertae sedis
    - Tamaulipas jackrabbit, Lepus altamirae
    - Japanese hare, Lepus brachyurus
    - Black-tailed jackrabbit, Lepus californicus
    - White-sided jackrabbit, Lepus callotis
    - Cape hare, Lepus capensis
    - Corsican hare, Lepus corsicanus
    - Tehuantepec jackrabbit, Lepus flavigularis
    - Granada hare, Lepus granatensis
    - Abyssinian hare, Lepus habessinicus
    - Woolly hare, Lepus oiostolus
    - Scrub hare, Lepus saxatilis
    - White-tailed jackrabbit, Lepus townsendii
- Genus †Serengetilagus
  - †Serengetilagus praecapensis
- Genus †Aztlanolagus
  - †Aztlanolagus agilis

== See also ==
- Mara (mammal)
- Viscacha
- Pachyrukhos

== Notes ==
=== References ===
- Carnell, Simon (2010). Burt, Jonathan (ed.). Hare. London: Reaktion Books. ISBN 978-1-86189-431-1.
- Dickenson, Victoria (2014). Burt, Jonathan (ed.). Rabbit. London: Reaktion Books. ISBN 978-1-78023-181-5.
- Schai-Braun, S.C.; Hackländer, K. (2016). "Family Leporidae (hares and rabbits)". In Wilson, D.E.; Lacher, T.E.; Mittermeier, R.A. (eds.). Handbook of the Mammals of the World. Vol. 6. Lagomorphs and Rodents I. Lynx Edicions. pp. 62–149. ISBN 978-84-941892-3-4.
- de Sousa-Pereira, Patricia; Abrantes, Joana; Baldauf, Hanna-Mari; Esteves, Pedro José (1 March 2019). "Evolutionary studies on the betaretrovirus RERV-H in the Leporidae family reveal an endogenization in the ancestor of Oryctolagus, Bunolagus and Pentalagus at 9 million years ago". Virus Research. Integration of viral sequences into eukaryotic host genomes: legacy of ancient infections. 262: 24–29. doi:10.1016/j.virusres.2017.12.001. ISSN 0168-1702. PMID 29208424.
