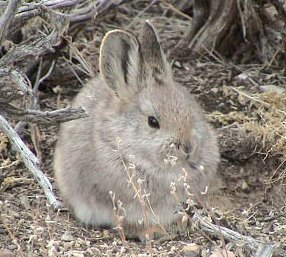

Conservation status
- Least Concern (IUCN 3.1)

- Apparently Secure (NatureServe)

Scientific classification
- Kingdom: Animalia
- Phylum: Chordata
- Class: Mammalia
- Order: Lagomorpha
- Family: Leporidae
- Genus: Sylvilagus
- Species: S. idahoensis

Binomial name
- Sylvilagus idahoensis (Merriam, 1891)
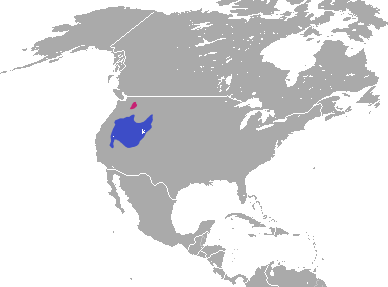
- Pygmy rabbit range (blue – native, pink – reintroduced)

Synonyms
- Lepus idahoensis (C. H. Merriam, 1891); Brachylagus idahoensis (Lyon, 1904); Microlagus idachoensis (Gureev, 1964); Sylvilagus idahoensis Corbet & J. Edwards Hill, 1980

= Pygmy rabbit =

Species of mammal

The pygmy rabbit (Sylvilagus idahoensis) is a rabbit species native to the United States. It is one of the only two native rabbit species in North America to dig its own burrow (the other is the volcano rabbit). The pygmy rabbit differs significantly from species within either the Lepus (hare) or Sylvilagus (cottontail) genera, and was once considered to be within the genus Brachylagus, which includes one extinct species. One isolated population, the Columbia Basin pygmy rabbit, is listed as an endangered species by the U.S. Federal government, though the International Union for Conservation of Nature lists the species as lower risk.

== Taxonomy ==
The pygmy rabbit was first described by Clinton Hart Merriam in 1891, as Lepus idahoensis; the type specimen, in winter pelage, had been collected in the Pahsimeroi Valley the previous autumn. In 1900, Gerrit Smith Miller Jr. erected the new subgenus Brachylagus for the pygmy rabbit. Historically, the pygmy rabbit has also been placed in the genera Microlagus and Sylvilagus. A 2022 study of ultraconserved elements within the lagomorphs recommended that Brachylagus idahoensis be reclassified as a member of Sylvilagus.

== Description ==
The pygmy rabbit is the world's smallest leporid. with adults weighing between 375 and 500 grams (0.827 and 1.102 lb), and having a body length between 23.5 and 29.5 centimeters (9.3 and 11.6 in); females are slightly larger than males. The pygmy rabbit is distinguishable from other leporids by its small size, uniquely rounded ears, gray color, small hind legs, and lack of white fuzzy fur. Like other rabbits and hares, it has a dental formula of 2.0.3.31.0.2.3 × 2 = 28—two pairs of upper and one pair of lower incisors, no canines, three upper and two lower premolars on each side, and three upper and lower molars on either side of the jaw.

== Distribution ==
The range of the pygmy rabbit includes most of the Great Basin and some of the adjacent intermountain areas of western North America. Pygmy rabbits are found in southwestern Montana from the extreme southwest corner near the Idaho border north to Dillon and Bannack in Beaverhead County. Distribution continues west to southern Idaho and southern Oregon, and south to northern Utah, northern Nevada, and north-eastern California. An isolated population occurs in east-central Washington, and another in Wyoming. The pygmy rabbit has a range that overlaps those of the desert (Sylvilagus audubonii) and mountain cottontails (Sylvilagus nuttallii), and it lives in sympatry with both species.

The elevational range of pygmy rabbits in Nevada extends from 1,370–2,135 meters (4,495–7,005 ft) and in California from 1,520–1,615 meters (4,987–5,299 ft).

The last male purebred Columbia Basin pygmy rabbit, found only in the Columbia Basin of Washington state, died 30 March 2006, at the Oregon Zoo in Portland. The last purebred female died in 2008. A crossbreeding program conducted by the Oregon Zoo, Washington State University, and Northwest Trek is attempting to preserve the genetic line by breeding surviving females with the Idaho pygmy rabbit.

== Lifecycle ==
The breeding season of pygmy rabbits is very short. In Idaho it lasts from March through May; in Utah, from February through March. The gestation period of pygmy rabbits is unknown. It is between 27 and 30 days in various species of cottontails (Sylvilagus spp.). An average of six young are born per litter and a maximum of three litters are produced per year. In Idaho the third litter is generally produced in June. It is unlikely that litters are produced in the fall. The growth rates of juveniles are dependent on the date of birth. Young from early litters grow larger due to a longer developmental period prior to their first winter. Pygmy rabbits are capable of breeding when they are about 1 year old.

The mortality of adults is highest in late winter and early spring. Green and Flinders reported in 1980 a maximum estimated annual adult mortality of 88% in Idaho. Juvenile mortality was highest from birth to 5 weeks of age. Pygmy rabbits may be active at any time of day; however, they are generally most active at dusk and dawn. They usually rest near or inside their burrows during midday.

== Habitat ==
Pygmy rabbits are normally found in areas on deep soils with tall, dense sagebrush which they use for shelter and food. Individual sagebrush plants in areas inhabited by pygmy rabbits are often 6 feet (1.8 m) or more in height. Extensive, well-used runways interlace the sage thickets and provide travel and escape routes. Dense stands of big sagebrush along streams, roads, and fencerows provide dispersal corridors for pygmy rabbits.

The pygmy rabbit is the only leporid native to North America that digs burrows. Juveniles use burrows more than other age groups. Early reproductive activities of adults may be concentrated at burrows. When pygmy rabbits can utilize sagebrush cover, burrow use is decreased. Pygmy rabbits use burrows more in the winter for thermal cover than at other times of the year.

Burrows are usually located on slopes at the base of sagebrush plants, and face north to east. Tunnels widen below the surface, forming chambers, and extend to a maximum depth of about 1 meter (3.3 ft). Burrows typically have 4 or 5 entrances but may have as few as 2 or as many as 10. In Oregon, pygmy rabbits inhabited areas where soils were significantly deeper and looser than soils at adjacent sites. Site selection was probably related to ease of excavation of burrows. In areas where soil is shallow pygmy rabbits live in holes among volcanic rocks, in stone walls, around abandoned buildings, and in burrows made by American badgers and yellow-bellied marmots.

Some researchers have found that pygmy rabbits never venture farther than 60 feet (18 m) from their burrows. However, Bradfield observed that pygmy rabbits range up to 100 meters (330 ft) from their burrows.

Some areas inhabited by pygmy rabbits are covered with several feet of snow for up to 2 or more months during the winter. During periods when the snow has covered most of the sagebrush, pygmy rabbits tunnel beneath the snow to find food. Snow tunnels are approximately the same height and width as burrows. They are quite extensive and extend from one sagebrush to another. Above ground movement during the winter months is restricted to these tunnel systems.

=== Cover requirements ===
Pygmy rabbits are restricted to areas with heavy shrub cover. Pygmy rabbits are seldom found in areas of sparse vegetative cover and seem to be reluctant to cross open space. In southeastern Idaho, woody cover and shrub height were significantly (p < 0.01) greater on sites occupied by pygmy rabbits than on other sites in the same area.

=== Plant communities ===
Pygmy rabbits are found primarily in big sagebrush and rabbitbrush dominated communities. Pygmy rabbits are also found in areas where greasewood is abundant. Some woody species found on sites inhabited by pygmy rabbits in southeastern Idaho include big sagebrush, antelope bitterbrush, threetip sagebrush, low rabbitbrush, gray horsebrush, and prickly phlox. Grasses and forbs include thick spike wheatgrass, plains reedgrass, sedges, prairie junegrass, Sandberg bluegrass, bluegrass, needle-and-thread grass, western yarrow, rosy pussytoes, milkvetch, arrowleaf balsamroot, buckwheat, tailcup lupine, and phlox. In the Upper Sonoran Desert pygmy rabbits occur in desert sagebrush associations dominated by big sagebrush and rabbitbrush with bitterbrush and sulphurflower (Eriogonum umbellatum var. stellatum).

== Food habits ==
The primary food of pygmy rabbits is big sagebrush, which may comprise up to 99% of the food eaten in the winter. Grasses and forbs are also eaten from mid- to late summer. In Idaho, Gates & Eng (1984) found that shrubs made up an average of 85.2% of pygmy rabbit diets from July to December. Shrub use was lowest in August (73.1%) and highest in December (97.9%). Big sagebrush was the most important shrub in the July to December diet (54.2%), followed by rubber rabbitbrush (25.8%) and winterfat (4.6%). Grasses comprised 10% of the July to December diet and were consumed mostly during July and August. Indian ricegrass and needlegrass were the most important grasses consumed. Forbs contributed 4.9% of the July to December diet.

In southeastern Idaho, Green & Flinders found that pygmy rabbits ate big sagebrush throughout the year, but in lesser amounts in summer (51% of diet) than in winter (99% of diet). Other shrubs in the area were consumed infrequently. Grass and forb consumption was relatively constant throughout the summer (39% and 10% of diet respectively) and decreased to a trace amount through fall and winter. Thickspike wheatgrass, bluebunch wheatgrass, and Sandberg bluegrass were preferred foods in the summer.

== Predators ==
Weasels are the principal predators of pygmy rabbits. Coyotes, red foxes, American badgers, bobcats, great horned owls, and northern harriers also prey on pygmy rabbits.

== Conservation status ==
=== Species-wide ===
In September 2007, Judge Edward Lodge of the U.S. District Court granted summary judgment to Western Watersheds Project, the litigant party, remanding the United States Fish and Wildlife Service 90 day finding denying conservationist parties' listing petition. The petition sought legal protection for pygmy rabbit as an endangered or threatened species.

Though the pygmy rabbit is vulnerable to habitat destruction due to its reliance on big sagebrush, which can be destroyed in brush fires and cleared in agricultural developments, there are several healthy populations in relatively undisturbed regions. The IUCN assessed the pygmy rabbit as a least-concern species in 2016.

=== Columbia Basin pygmy rabbit ===
An isolated population of pygmy rabbits was known to live in the Columbia River drainage basin. This population of rabbits declined due to its small size and inbreeding, and the last purebred Columbia Basin pygmy rabbit died in 2008. Efforts to revive the population through interbreeding with the wider pygmy rabbit population were led by the Oregon Zoo, which produced 26 kits in 2009, up to a total of 76 across the known breeding populations.

Results from 2011 through 2014 efforts were encouraging for recovery of the species to the state. WDFW developed techniques for breeding wild and captive-bred pygmy rabbits in protected semi-wild enclosures on wildlife areas to increase numbers of individuals for release. From 2011 to 2013, biologists translocated 109 pygmy rabbits from Nevada, Utah, Oregon and Wyoming to the breeding enclosures in Douglas and Grant Counties, along with the remaining captive rabbits. Today over 1,300 kits have been produced in the enclosures since 2011. This high production allowed for the release of over 1,200 rabbits to the wild on Sagebrush Flat Wildlife Area from 2011 through 2014. Due to this success, beginning in 2015, pygmy rabbits are being released into a second recovery area located on the private land of The Nature Conservancy Preserve in Grant County. Released pygmy rabbits are closely monitored to collect data on breeding, habitat use, survival, mortalities and other factors to modify reintroduction techniques and adaptively manage the newly-formed population.

== Further information ==
- This article incorporates public domain material from Brachylagus idahoensis. United States Department of Agriculture.
- Federal Register (PDF) (Report). United States Government. 2003.
- Columbia Basin Distinct population segment of the pygmy rabbit (Brachylagus idahoensis) (PDF) (Report). Recovery Outline. U.S. Fish and Wildlife Service. 2004.
- "Last-ditch effort to save endangered pygmy rabbits is nearing its end". Wenatchee World. Wenatchee, WA. 23 January 2009. Archived from the original on 23 January 2009.
- "Pygmy rabbits get last-minute reprieve". Wenatchee World. Wenatchee, WA. 12 March 2010.
