= Henry Lyster Jameson =

Irish zoologist, educationist and marxist

- Born: 1875; County Monaghan, Ireland
- Died: 26 February 1922 (aged 46–47); West Mersea, England
- Education: Trinity College Dublin; Heidelberg University
- Scientific career
- Fields: Zoology

Henry Paul William Lyster Jameson (1875 – 26 February 1922) was an Irish zoologist who studied pearl-formation. He also made contributions to speleology and encouraged the study of psychology in adult education.

== Early life ==
H. Lyster Jameson was born in County Monaghan the son of Paul Lyster Jameson, the rector of Killincoole. He was educated at Trinity College Dublin. In 1895 he explored the Marble Arch Caves with Édouard-Alfred Martel, and was the first to describe fauna in the Mitchelstown Cave.

After a year at the Royal College of Science in London, Jameson studied zoology under Otto Bütschli at the University of Heidelberg, writing his dissertation (1898) on Thalassema neptuni, a species of spoon worms. Put in charge of a pearling station in British New Guinea, he studied the causes of pearl-formation. He continued this research at the Lancashire Sea Fisheries Station in Piel Island, Barrow-in-Furness, developing the parasitic theory of pearl-formation in the common sea mussel.

== Natal, 1902-8 ==
After developing pulmonary tuberculosis, he went to South Africa in 1902 to take up a position with the Transvaal Education Department. He worked as a school inspector setting up schools in concentration camps to anglicise the Boers following their defeat in the Second Boer War. He married Millicent Lucy Parker at Krugersdorp. He worked for the Natal Education Department and later was professor of Biology the Transvaal Technical Institute in Johannesburg. However when the Institute – renamed the Transvaal University College – was reorganised in 1908. Jameson was unable to attract sufficient students to his courses and his post was abolished and he then returned to England.

== England 1908-1922 ==
On return to England in 1908 he had a post with the Board of Education and was elected a Fellow of the Royal Zoological Society later that year. Back in England from 1914 he was employed as a civil servant for Board of Agriculture and Fisheries. He quickly set up the Fisheries Experimental Station at West Mersea.

=== Outline of Psychology ===
Jameson became a Marxist and joined the Plebs' League, with whom he made "strenuous attempts [...] to develop psychology" as a component of working-class education in the League. He used the pen-name "Nordicus". He wrote the first draft of An Outline of Psychology, an introductory psychology textbook published by them. The final text was produced in an attempt at "communal production"

This version went through eight editions before Eden and Cedar Paul, with Edward Conze produced a revised edition in 1938, by which time 18,000 copies had been produced.

He died of tuberculosis in 1922.

== Works ==
- Contributions to the anatomy and histology of Thalassema neptunii Gaertner, 1899. Jena : G. Fischer, 1899.
- On the origin of pearls, 1902
- Studies on pearl-oysters and pearls. Pt. 1. Structure of the shell and pearls of the Ceylon pearl-oyster (Margaritifera vulgaris Schumacher); with an examination of the cestode theory of pearl-production, 1912
- Jameson, Henry Lyster; Drummond, Jack Cecil; Coward, Katharine Hope (1922). "Synthesis of Vitamin A by a Marine Diaton (Nitzschia closterium W Sm.) growing in Pure Culture". Biochemical Journal. 16 (4). London: 482–485. doi:10.1042/bj0160482. PMC 1259096. PMID 16743103.
- Outline of psychology, Plebs' League, 1922. 6th ed., 1933, revised and expanded by Eden and Cedar Paul.
