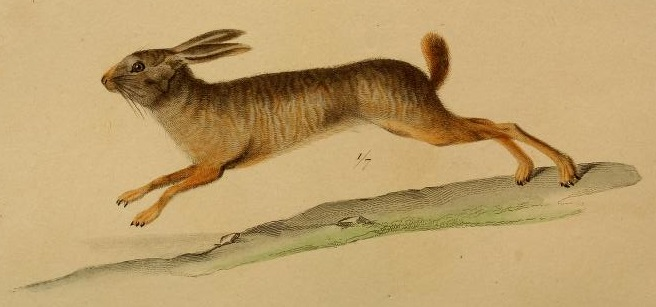
- Illustration of P. crassicaudatus from Geoffroy, 1832

Conservation status
- Least Concern (IUCN 3.1)

Scientific classification
- Kingdom: Animalia
- Phylum: Chordata
- Class: Mammalia
- Order: Lagomorpha
- Family: Leporidae
- Genus: Pronolagus
- Species: P. crassicaudatus

Binomial name
- Pronolagus crassicaudatus (I. Geoffroy Saint-Hilaire, 1832)

Subspecies
- P. c. crassicaudatus Geoffroy, 1832; P. c. ruddi Thomas and Schwann, 1905
- P. crassicaudatus range

Synonyms
- kariegae Hewitt, 1927; lebombo Roberts, 1936; lebomboensis Roberts, 1936

= Natal red rock hare =

Species of mammal

The Natal red rock hare or greater red rock hare (Pronolagus crassicaudatus) is a species of mammal in the family Leporidae (rabbits and hares). It has a slightly grizzled, grayish brown head and reddish brown upperparts. The dense fur is thick and rougher than other rock hares. It is endemic to Africa, and found in southeastern provinces of South Africa (Eastern Cape, Mpumalanga, and KwaZulu-Natal), eastern Lesotho, Eswatini (Highveld and Lumbobo), and southern Mozambique (Maputo Province). It is a herbivore, primarily feeding on grass. It breeds throughout the year, and one or two pups are usually born in the summer. It is rated as a species of least concern on the IUCN Red List of Endangered Species.

== Taxonomy ==
French zoologist Isidore Geoffroy Saint-Hilaire first described the Natal red rock hare in 1832 and classified it in the genus Lepus, giving it the name Lepus crassicaudatus. American mammalogist Marcus Ward Lyon Jr. later placed the Natal red rock hare in the genus Pronolagus in 1906, and it was given the name Pronolagus crassicaudatus. It was previously considered a subspecies of the Jameson's red rock hare (P. randensis).

In the third edition of Mammal Species of the World published in 2005, R. S. Hoffman and A. T. Smith listed the Natal red rock hare (Pronolagus crassicaudatus) as a separate species and included its four taxonomic synonyms: P. c. kariegae (Hewitt, 1927); P. c. lebombo (Roberts, 1936); P. c. lebomboensis (Roberts, 1936); and P. c. ruddi (Thomas and Schwann, 1905). They described the taxonomic relationship between the Natal red rock hare and Jameson's red rock hare (P. randensis) as unclear.

== Description ==
The Natal red rock hare is a large rabbit, measuring 46 to 56 cm (18 to 22 in) in length, having a 3.5 to 11 cm (1.4 to 4.3 in) long, bright reddish brown tail lighter in tone than other members of the genus, and weighing 2.4 to 3 kg (5.3 to 6.6 lb). It has a slightly grizzled, grayish brown head with gray or grayish white lower cheeks and chin, and a grayish white band running laterally along the jaw edge up to the nuchal patch. It has grizzled, brown dorsal pelage flecked with black, and pale reddish brown ventral pelage with non-uniform white patches and streaks. The flanks are paler than the dorsal fur and have fewer hairs, which feature black tips. The upperparts and gular collar are reddish brown in color, in contrast with the color of the chest and throat. The underparts are grayish, grizzled with rufous fur. The ears are short, measuring 7.5 to 8.5 cm (3.0 to 3.3 in) in length, sparsely furred, and are gray on the inner surface and whitish gray on the outer surface. The nuchal patch is brown to gray in color, and the rump is bright reddish brown. It has gray underfur. The feet pads are reddish brown, and the forelimbs and hindlimbs are a dull reddish brown. The dense fur is thick and rougher than other rock hares. The flesh is reported to have an odor comparable to urine.

It is similar to the Hewitt's red rock hare (P. saunderside), which is shorter, has shorter ears, and a longer tail.

== Distribution and habitat ==
The Natal red rock hare is endemic to southern Africa; it is present in southeastern provinces of South Africa (Eastern Cape, Mpumalanga, and KwaZulu-Natal), eastern Lesotho, Eswatini (Highveld and Lumbobo), and southern Mozambique (Maputo Province). It lives in steep, rocky terrain like cliffs, hillsides with scattered rocks and boulders, stone outcrops, and rocky gorges with edible grass. It takes refuge in tussock grasses or low, dense vegetation. It is found at heights of up to 1,550 metres (5,090 ft) above sea level.

== Behavior and ecology ==
The Natal red rock hare lives in small colonies consisting of a few hares. It is a nocturnal species, and hides in creeks or under rocks, boulders, or dense grass during the day. It is a herbivore, and feeds on grass, especially young grass, weeds, and herbs. As it obtains moisture from dew and from food, it is independent of water, but it drinks any available water. It travels to higher elevations at night to forage on grasses. It has a good, 360 degree vision, sense of smell, and hearing. On erecting its ears, a network of veins on the inner surface radiate heat to reduce the body temperature. The breeding period continues throughout the year. The nest is lined with plant material and female fur. After a gestation period of one month one or two pups weighing 70 to 100 g (2.5 to 3.5 oz) are usually born in the summer. It produces grunting calls while contacting with other members of the species, and produces shrill screams and cries when alarmed. It is known to fight through bites and kicks with the hindfeet when caught. It can live up to an age of five years.

Its predators include all larger carnivores such as leopards, caracals, African wildcats, snakes, and birds of prey.

== Status and conservation ==
Since 1996, the Natal red rock hare has been rated as a species of least concern on the IUCN Red List of Endangered Species. This is because it is widespread, having a large range—more than 20,000 square kilometres (7,700 mi^{2})—and although its range and population are decreasing, the number of mature individuals in the wild is above 10,000. It is abundant within its range in provincial parks, national parks, and wildlife refugees, and is also protected by Provincial Nature Conservation agencies seasonally, as a game species.

Human activities such as encroachment of settlements, agriculture, and hunting in rural areas poses a threat to the Natal red rock hare, due to which its population is decreasing. Since the 1900s, more than 21% to 50% of its habitat has been destroyed, which is predicted to remain between 21% and 50% till 2022, decreasing its population by 20% or more by then.
