= Oryctolagus valdarnensis =

Oryctolagus valdarnensis Temporal range: Late Villanyian–Early Biharian

Scientific classification
- Kingdom: Animalia
- Phylum: Chordata
- Class: Mammalia
- Order: Lagomorpha
- Family: Leporidae
- Genus: Oryctolagus
- Species: †O. valdarnensis

Binomial name
- †Oryctolagus valdarnensis Weithofer, 1889

Extinct species of mammal

Oryctolagus valdarnensis is a fossil species of rabbit known from the early Pleistocene of upper Valdarno, Italy. Its remains have been found in various regions around the Valdarno valley, including Monte Argentario. It is larger than the currently living European rabbit (O. cuniculus), as well as O. laynensis, and is distinguished from the comparable O. burgi by features of its second upper premolar. Fossils have been found that date between 2.1 to 1.2 million years ago.
