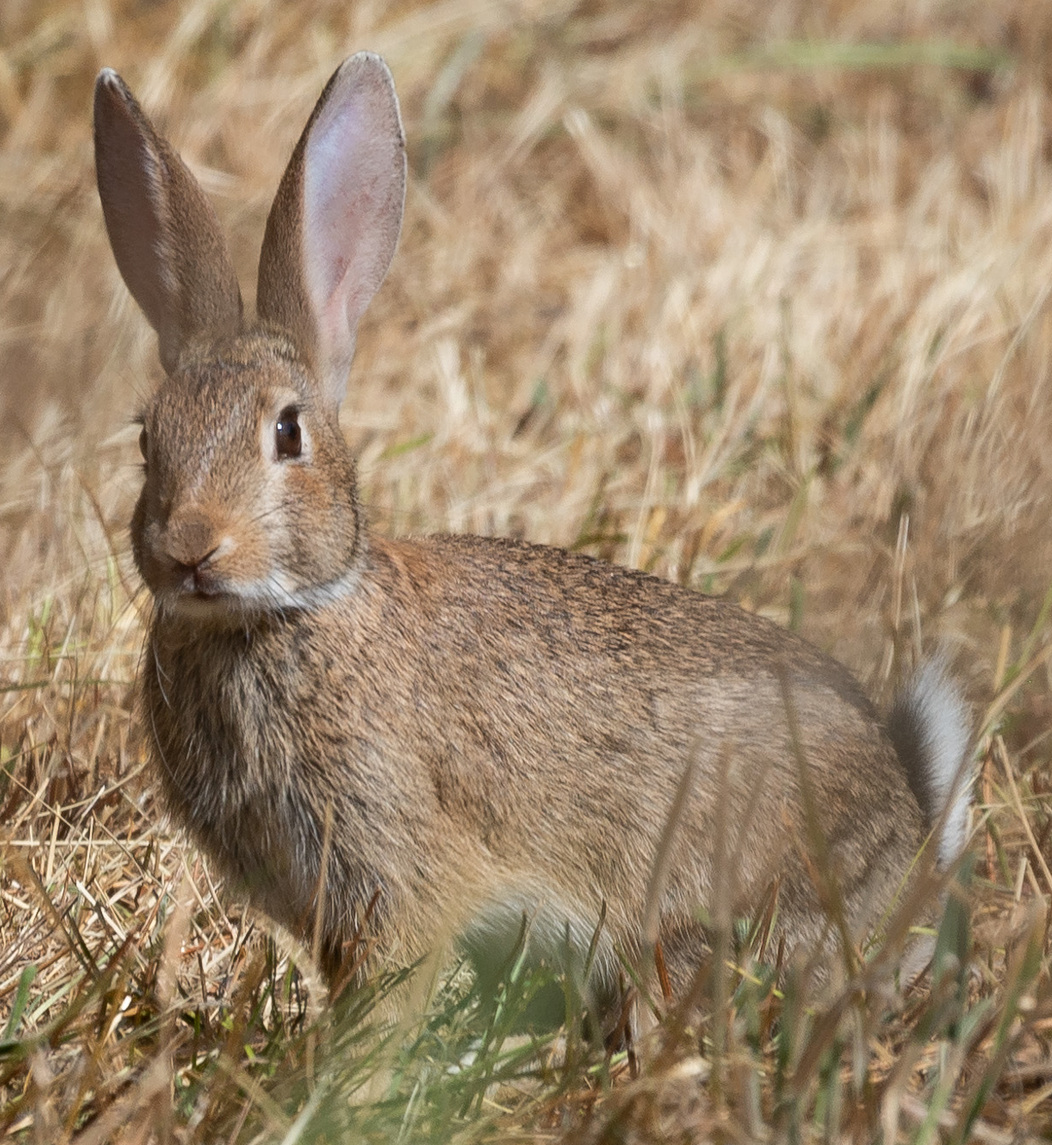
- O. c. cuniculus in Burgos, Spain
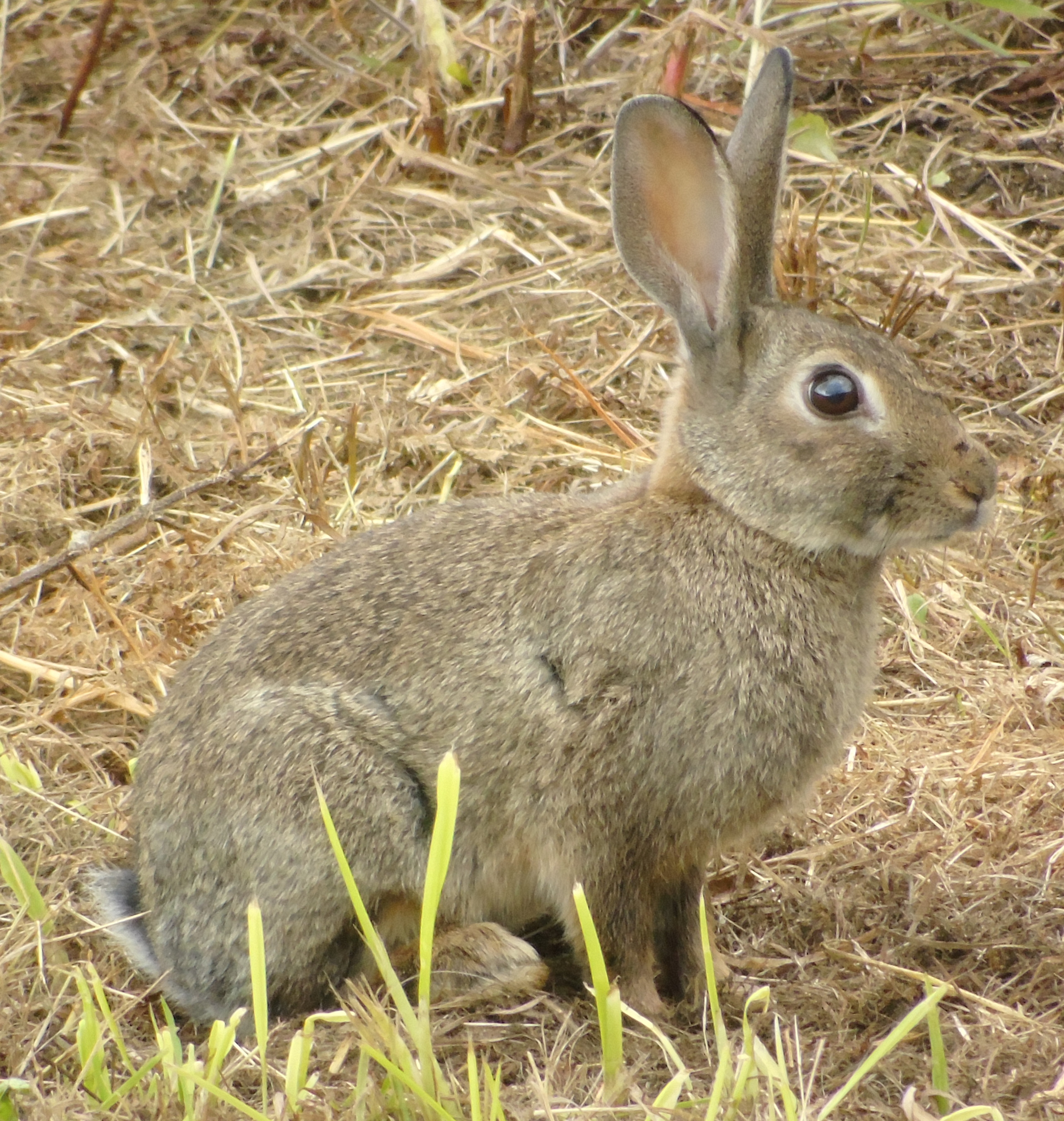
- O. c. algirus in A Coruña, Galicia, Spain

Conservation status
- Near Threatened (IUCN 3.1)

Scientific classification
- Kingdom: Animalia
- Phylum: Chordata
- Class: Mammalia
- Order: Lagomorpha
- Family: Leporidae
- Genus: Oryctolagus
- Species: O. cuniculus

Binomial name
- Oryctolagus cuniculus Linnaeus (1758)
- Range map: Native (IUCN, 2019) Introduced (IUCN, 2008)

Synonyms
- List: Lepus cuniculus Linnaeus, 1758; Cuniculus campestris F. A. A. Meyer, 1790; Lepus saccatus Kerr, 1792; Lepus sericeus Kerr, 1792; Lepus Angorensis W. Turton, 1802; Lepus magellanicus Lesson, 1826; Cuniculus varius S.D.W., 1836; Lepus vernicularis W. Thompson, 1837; Cuniculus dasypus Gloger, 1841; Lepus Vermicula J. E. Gray, 1843; Lepus domesticus P. Gervais, 1850; Cuniculus domesticus A. T. de Rochebrune, 1883; Lepus huxleyi Haeckel, 1874; Lepus nigripes A. D. Bartlett, 1857; Cuniculus algirus Loche, 1858; Cuniculus fodiens J. E. Gray, 1867; Cuniculus kreyenbergi Honigmann, 1913

Audio
- The calls of a pet rabbit

= European rabbit =

European rabbit Temporal range: Chibanian–Recent ~0.6–0 Ma

Species of mammal

The European rabbit (Oryctolagus cuniculus) or coney is a species of rabbit native to the Iberian Peninsula and southwestern France. It has been introduced to hundreds of locations around the world. Wild and domesticated European rabbits around the world can vary widely in size, shape, and colour. The average adult European rabbit is smaller than the European hare, though size and weight vary with habitat and diet.

European rabbits prefer grassland habitats and are herbivorous, mainly feeding on grasses and leaves, though they may supplement their diet with berries, tree bark, and field crops such as maize. They are prey to a variety of predators, including birds of prey, weasels, cats, and canids. The European rabbit's main defence against predators is to run and hide, using vegetation and its own burrows for cover. It is well known for digging networks of burrows, called warrens, where it spends most of its time when not feeding. The European rabbit lives in social groups centred around territorial females. European rabbits in an established social group will rarely stray far from their warren, with female rabbits leaving the warren mainly to establish nests where they will raise their young. Unlike hares, rabbits are born blind and helpless, requiring maternal care until they leave the nest.

The European rabbit has been hunted since the Paleolithic period, and raised as a food source since at least the first century BCE. It has also had major agricultural and biological impacts as an invasive species. It is the only domesticated species of rabbit, and all known breeds of domestic rabbit are its descendants. It has often been introduced to exotic locations as a food source or for sport hunting. It has been introduced to at least 800 islands and every continent except Antarctica, often with devastating effects on local biodiversity due to a lack of predators. However, the species is listed as near threatened by the International Union for Conservation of Nature, as it has faced population decline in its native range due to overhunting, habitat destruction, and diseases such as myxomatosis and rabbit haemorrhagic disease. This decline has directly led to negative impacts on populations of the Iberian lynx and Spanish imperial eagle, predators that rely on the rabbit as food.

== Evolution ==
=== Taxonomy ===
Originally assigned to the genus Lepus by Swedish biologist Carl Linnaeus in 1758, the European rabbit was placed in the newly created genus Oryctolagus in 1874 by Swedish zoologist Wilhelm Lilljeborg. This generic name derives from ὀρυκτός (oryktos, 'burrowing') and λαγώς (lagōs, 'hare'). Its species name, cuniculus, stems from the Low Latin root word cunicularia, the feminine form of the adjective cunicularius. The European rabbit had several characteristics that distinguished it from the known hares: it had unique burrowing habits, blind and helpless (altricial) young, and a narrow nasal opening. It is superficially similar to the North American cottontails (Sylvilagus) in that both are altricial, have white flesh, and display little sexual dimorphism. However, they differ in skull characteristics, and cottontails do not construct their own burrows as the European rabbit does. Molecular studies confirm the resemblance is due to convergent evolution, and that the European rabbit's closest relatives are the riverine rabbit (Bunolagus monticularis), the hispid hare (Caprolagus hispidus), and the Amami rabbit (Pentalagus furnessi). The European rabbit gene IGKC1, responsible for the principal immunoglobulin light chain, shows high amino acid divergence between domesticated types and ferals derived from them. This divergence can be as high as 40%, and indicates high genetic diversity of populations surviving over evolutionary time scales.

The following cladogram, based on analysis of nuclear and mitochondrial DNA done by Matthee and colleagues in 2004 and clarifications from Abrantes and colleagues in 2011, encompasses the known genera of rabbits and hares:

- - Nesolagus (striped rabbits)
  - - Poelagus (Bunyoro rabbit)
    - Pronolagus (red rock hares)
- - Romerolagus (volcano rabbit)
  - - - - - Sylvilagus (cottontails)
          - Brachylagus (pygmy rabbit)
        - - - - Bunolagus (riverine rabbit)
              - Oryctolagus (European rabbit)
            - Caprolagus (hispid hare)
          - Pentalagus (Amami rabbit)
    - Lepus (hares)

=== Subspecies ===
As of 2025, there are two recognized subspecies of the European rabbit: O. c. cuniculus and O. c. algirus. These subspecies are also referred to as the common rabbit and the Iberian rabbit, respectively. The common rabbit has a native range encompassing parts of southern France and north-east Spain, while the Iberian rabbit occurs in the south-west part of the Iberian Peninsula (Spain, Portugal and Andorra). Both subspecies have been introduced to regions beyond their native range, though the common rabbit is much more widespread. While the common rabbit has been introduced to every continent besides Antarctica and several hundred islands, the Iberian rabbit is only known as non-native on a few islands: the Azores, Madeira, Canary, and Balearic Islands; Corsica, Sardinia, and Sicily.

The two accepted subspecies of European rabbit differ enough such that they have been proposed for separation into distinct species. Compared to the common rabbit, the Iberian rabbit is smaller and has more pronounced reverse sexual dimorphism (females are larger). It is also affected by different parasites. The Iberian rabbit has a notably high diversity of nucleotides compared to other rabbits.

Historically, the number and names of the European rabbit's subspecies have changed. Their original descriptions were often differentiated only in body size or patterns in fur colour. Little to no reference was given for a subspecies' geographic range or variations in size or appearance. Writing in the Zoological Journal of the Linnean Society in 1996, Colin Sharples and colleagues noted that "[t]here has been no comprehensive account of the taxonomic status of the European rabbit since Miller's (1912) catalogue of European mammals". The referenced Gerrit Smith Miller Jr., an American naturalist, described two subspecies of European rabbit in 1912: the nominate subspecies O. c. cuniculus, and the Mediterranean rabbit O. c. huxleyi. He noted that the 19th-century species Lepus vernicularis and Lepus vermicula were nomina nuda (having no proper description) and should be considered synonyms of the common rabbit. Cuniculus fodiens was also made a synonym of the common rabbit in this work. Of the Mediterranean rabbit, Miller wrote that it was smaller than O. c. cuniculus and appeared to have a "more grey and finely grizzled" colour. (Note: This subspecies would later be made a synonym of O. c. algirus.) In 1951, Ellerman and Morrisson-Scott provided a list of six subspecies; there they wrote that the species Cuniculus kreyenbergi was a synonym of O. c. cuniculus. This was based on a 1938 account by American zoologist Glover Morrill Allen that presumed it to be a non-native population of the European rabbit in China. A profile of the species by John A. Gibb in 1990 followed Miller and again recognized only O. c. cuniculus and O. c. huxleyi. Sharples found in 1996 that there were two distinct lineages of mitochondrial DNA in Europe, but did not recommend which subspecies should be recognized going forward, if any. By 2005, six subspecies were recognized in the third edition of Mammal Species of the World:

- Common rabbit O. c. cuniculus (Linnaeus, 1758)
- Iberian rabbit O. c. algirus (Loche, 1858)
- Mediterranean rabbit O. c. huxleyi Haeckel, 1874
- Cretan rabbit O. c. cnossius Bate, 1906
- Camargue rabbit O. c. brachyotus Trouessart, 1917
- African rabbit O. c. habetensis Cabrera, 1923

This organization was similar to that put forth by Ellerman and Morrisson-Scott in 1951. The earlier account differed in that the Cretan rabbit was considered a synonym of the Mediterranean rabbit, and O. c. oreas—thought to be a subspecies endemic to Morocco—was an accepted name. This taxonomy was challenged by genetic studies undertaken in 2008, which indicated only two extant subspecies: O. c. cuniculus and O. c. algirus. These remain the two recognized subspecies of European rabbit, as of 2025. The two lineages are thought to have diverged during the Quaternary glaciation 2 million years ago (Mya). Most populations in regions where the European rabbit is not native are considered to belong to O. c. cuniculus. This includes O. c. brachyotus, O. c. cnossius, and O. c. habetensis. Conservation efforts have historically treated the common rabbit and Iberian rabbit as interchangeable with regards to policies and translocation programmes; this has impacted the declining Iberian rabbit population and spurred efforts to recognize the two lineages as separate species, based on differences in morphology and behavior; genomic data revealed that the population in western Iberia shared a common ancestor with those in the east roughly 2 million years ago.

Subspecies	Trinomial authority	Skull	Image	Description	Range	Synonyms
Common rabbit O. c. cuniculus (Nominate subspecies)	(Linnaeus, 1758)	Dorsal view of the common rabbit subspecies' skull	Grey rabbit	Longer ears and hind feet, greater body mass overall, less pronounced reverse sexual dimorphism compared to O. c. algirus. Domesticated.	Native to northeastern Iberia and southern France. Introduced to Crete, northern Morocco, northern Algeria, the British Isles, Central, Southern and Eastern Europe, Australia, New Zealand, Chile, Africa, and several Atlantic and Pacific islands.	brachyotus (Trouessart, 1917) cnossius (Bate, 1906) fodiens (Gray, 1867) habetensis (Cabrera, 1923) kreyenbergi (Honigmann, 1913) vermicula (Gray, 1843) vernicularis (Thompson, 1837)
Iberian rabbit O. c. algirus	(Loche, 1858)	Dorsal view of the Iberian rabbit subspecies' skull	Brown rabbit	Smaller and with more pronounced reverse sexual dimorphism compared to O. c. cuniculus. Notably high diversity of nucleotides compared to other rabbits. Affected by different parasites compared to O. c. cuniculus.	Native to Portugal and southern Spain. Introduced to the Azores, Madeira, and Canary Islands; the Balearic Islands, Corsica, Sardinia, and Sicily.	huxleyi (Haeckel, 1874)

=== Fossil record ===
The oldest known fossils of the currently living European rabbit species, Oryctolagus cuniculus, date to 0.6 million years ago in the Middle Pleistocene age in southern Spain. The first fossils belonging to the genus Oryctolagus were found in Granada and date to 6 Mya during the Miocene epoch. Species such as O. laynensis, a presumed ancestor of O. cuniculus, and O. lacosti were recorded from 3.5 Mya up until the appearance of O. cuniculus. This species, O. cuniculus, was the only member of its genus to survive to the Late Pleistocene, whereupon it spread from the Iberian Peninsula to the Mediterranean and northern Europe. Fossils of the European rabbit are also known in the Maghreb from this period, though they were likely introduced to the region by humans. During the Last Glacial Maximum, a period lasting roughly from 26.5 to 19 thousand years ago, much of Europe was covered in permafrost, and conditions were cold and dry. Glaciers were at their greatest extent from 20 to 18 thousand years ago. Rabbit populations during this period were largely confined to the Iberian Peninsula and southern France, where they remained in two distinct, isolated refugia. They dispersed away from these refugia into central Spain after glaciers retreated, in the Early Holocene epoch roughly 11.5 thousand years ago.

== Description ==
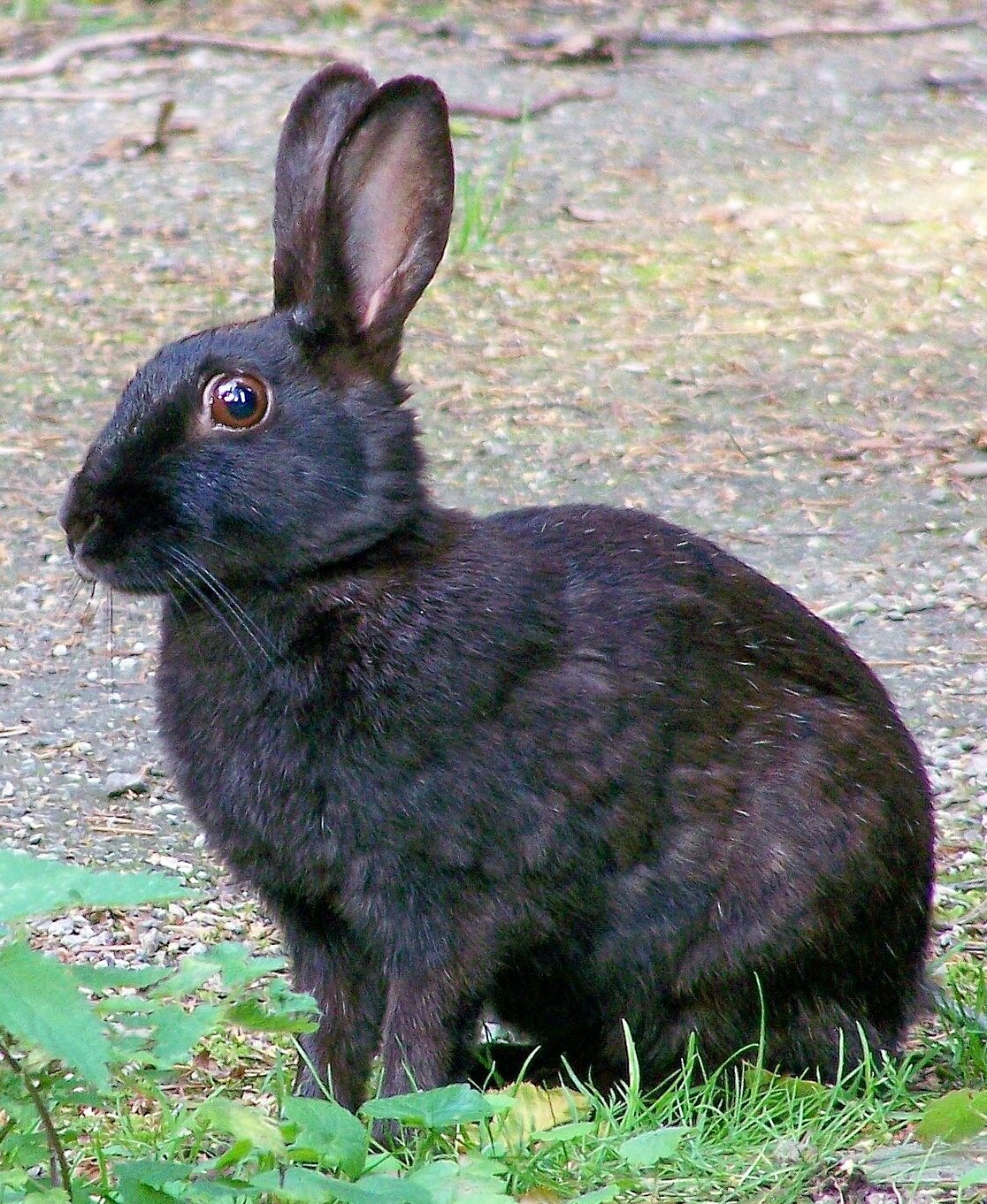
Melanistic rabbits are more common where ground predators are lacking, such as on islands or in large enclosures.

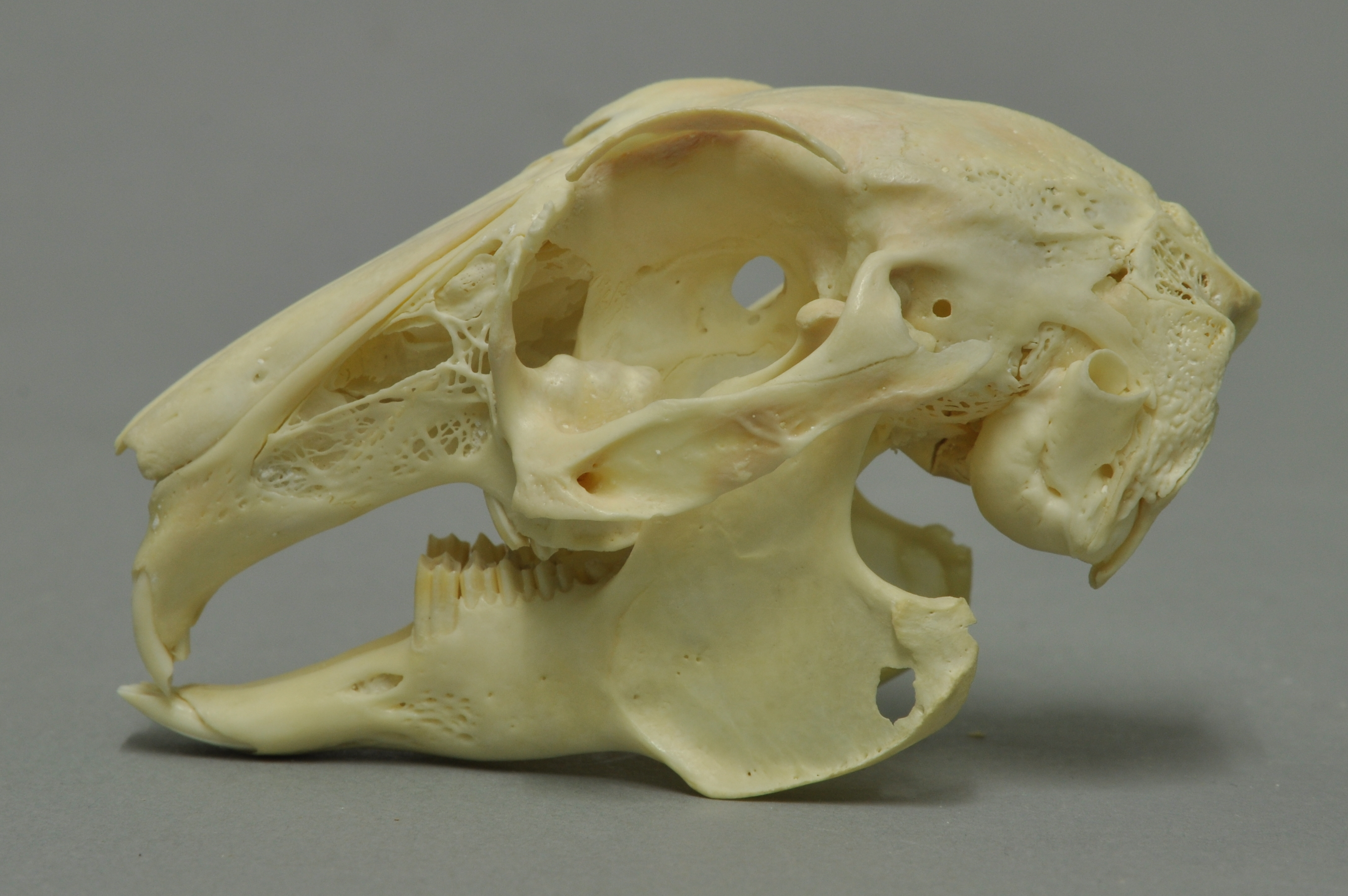
The skull of the European rabbit displays a significant facial tilt of roughly 45° forward relative to the base of the skull at rest, which supports its means of locomotion being mainly jumping or hopping (saltorial) rather than running (cursorial).

Adult European rabbits typically range from 36 to 38 centimetres (14 to 15 inches) in length and weigh 1.5 to 3 kilograms (3.3 to 6.6 pounds). The tail is 6.5 to 7 cm (2.6 to 2.8 in) long, and the hind foot measures 8 to 8.9 cm (3.1 to 3.5 in) in length. The ears are 7 to 8 cm (2.8 to 3.1 in) long. The European rabbit is smaller than the European hare and mountain hare, has proportionately shorter legs and lacks black ear tips.

Size and weight vary according to food and habitat quality. Rabbits living on light soil with nothing but grass to feed on are noticeably smaller than specimens living on highly cultivated farmlands with plenty of roots and clover. Pure European rabbits weighing 2.3 kg (5 lb) and upwards are uncommon, but are occasionally reported. One large specimen, caught in February 1890 in Lichfield, England, was weighed at 2.8 kg (6 lb 2 oz). Within its native range of the Iberian peninsula, the European rabbit is generally smaller than in regions it has been introduced to, weighing from 0.9 to 1.4 kg (2.0 to 3.1 lb). Unlike the brown hare, the male European rabbit is more heavily built than the female. The penis is located posterior to the scrotum and lacks a baculum (the penis bone, present in many mammals, but not in rabbits) and true glans. The testicles, which are located in scrotal sacs to each side of the penis, can be retracted into the abdomen when food is scarce or when sexually inactive. Rudimentary nipples are also present in male rabbits.

The fur of the European rabbit is made up of soft down hair covered by stiff guard hairs, and is generally greyish-brown, though this is subject to much variation. The guard hairs are banded brown and black, or grey, while the nape of the neck and scrotum are reddish. The chest patch is brown, while the rest of the underparts are white or grey. A white star shape is often present on kittens' foreheads, but rarely occurs in adults. The whiskers are long and black, and the feet are fully furred and buff-coloured. The tail has a white underside, which becomes prominent when escaping danger. This may act as a signal for other rabbits to run.

Moulting occurs once a year, beginning in March on the face and spreading over the back. The underfur is completely replaced by October–November. The European rabbit exhibits great variation in colour, from white and light sandy to dark grey and completely black. Such variation depends largely on the amount of guard hairs relative to regular pelage. Melanistic rabbits are not uncommon in mainland Europe, though albinos are rare.

The skeleton and musculature of the European rabbit, like other rabbits and hares, are suited to survival by rapid escape from predators. Compared to other mammals of similar size, the European rabbit's skeleton is fragile and light, making up 8% of the rabbit's body weight on average. For comparison, the skeleton of a domestic cat makes up 13% of its weight. Most of the muscular development in the rabbit is focused in the lumbar (abdominal) region and the limbs, particularly in the thighs. The rabbit's hind limbs are an exaggerated feature, being much longer and capable of producing more force than the forelimbs. Underuse of the rabbit's muscles leads to osteoporosis via bone rarefaction.

== Life history and behaviour ==
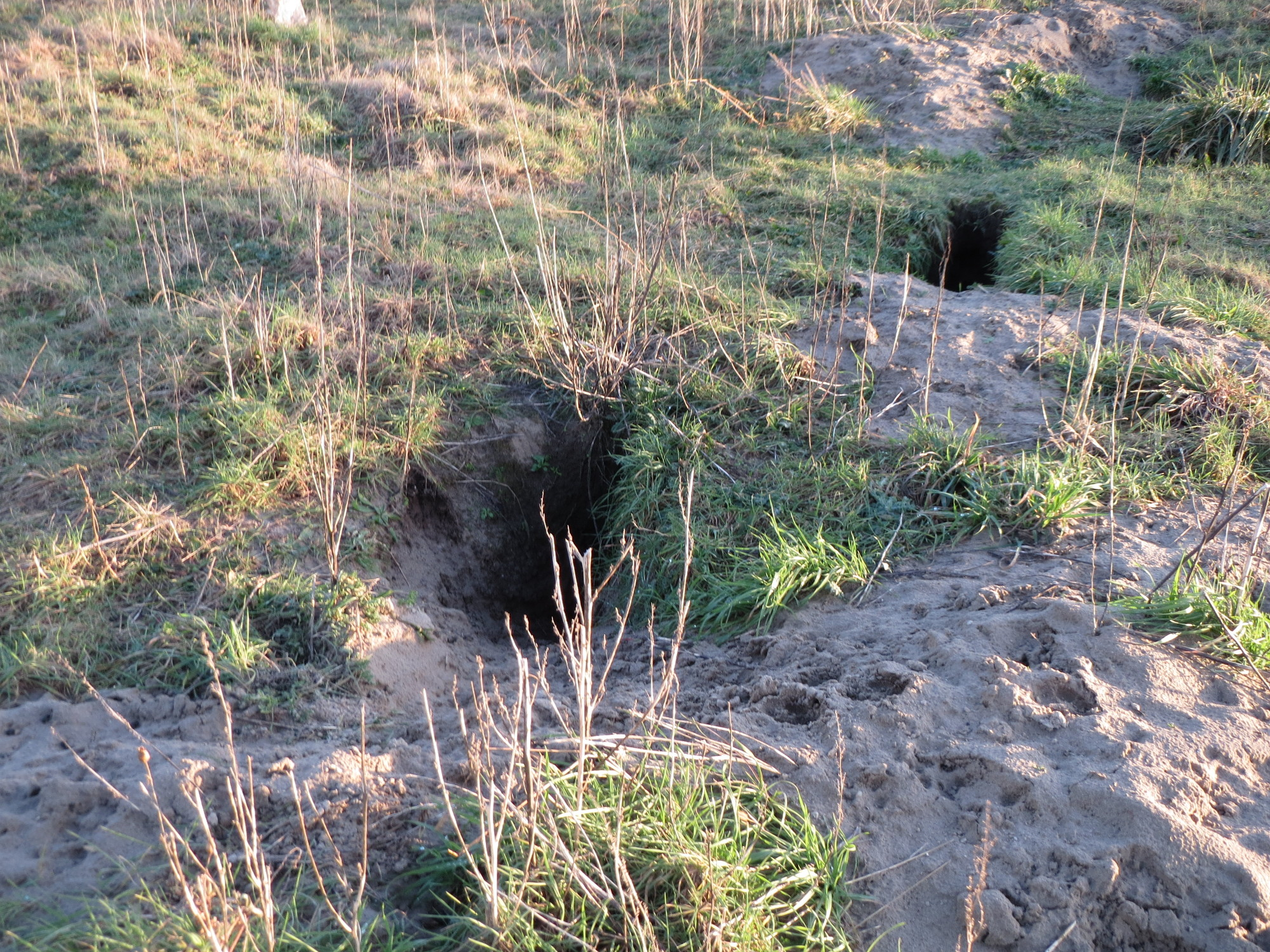
Entrances to a warren

=== Social and territorial behaviour ===
The European rabbit lives in burrows known as warrens that contain social groups consisting of one to five adult males, known as bucks, and one to eight adult females, known as does. These warrens often form around a dominant male and several subordinate females and males, and they benefit the population by providing a location safe from predators to raise young. Breeding groups of rabbits may extend to include two or more nearby warrens if beneficial to the population. European rabbits are territorial, and even within a warren will defend their territory against neighbouring social groups. Females tend to be more territorial than males. Rabbit territories are marked with dung hills, known as latrines.

The size of the species' home range varies according to habitat, food, shelter, cover from predators, and breeding sites, though it is generally small, encompassing about 4 ha (9.9 acres). Male ranges tend to be larger than those of females, though this can vary depending on environmental factors. Female home ranges have been observed to be larger than those of males when rabbit density is low and high-quality food is abundant. The European rabbit rarely strays far from its burrow; when feeding on cultivated fields, it typically only moves 25 m (80 ft) away from its burrow, and rarely 50 m (160 ft). It may, however, move as far as 500 m (1,600 ft) after an abrupt change in environment, such as a harvest. This behaviour may be an antipredator adaptation, as rabbits in areas where predators are under rigorous control may move three times further from their burrows than those in areas without predator management.

The European rabbit is a gregarious animal, which lives in stable social groups centred around females and sharing access to one or more burrow systems. Social structures tend to be looser in areas where burrow construction is relatively easy. Dominance hierarchies exist in parallel for both bucks and does. Among bucks, status is determined through access to does, with dominant bucks siring the majority of the colony's offspring. The dominant does have priority access to the best nesting sites, with competition over such sites often leading to serious injury or death; they have been observed fighting as hard or harder than bucks when vying for resources, including good nesting sites. Subordinate does, particularly in large colonies, typically resort to using single-entrance breeding spots far from the main warren, or may abandon the warren entirely, thus making themselves vulnerable to fox or badger predation.

=== Reproduction and development ===
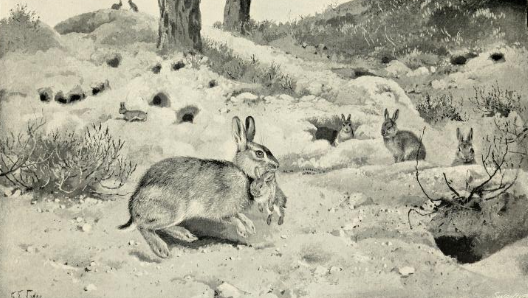
Maternal Instinct (c. 1898), illustrated by G. E. Lodge

In the European rabbit's mating system, dominant bucks exhibit polygyny, whereas lower-status individuals (both bucks and does) often form monogamous breeding relationships; monogamous relationships are also common among groups of rabbits with lower density of females. Rabbits signal their readiness to copulate by marking other animals and inanimate objects with an odoriferous substance secreted through a chin gland, in a process known as "chinning". Though male European rabbits may sometimes be amicable with one another, fierce fights can erupt among bucks during the breeding season, which typically starts in autumn and continues through to spring. Occasionally, the mating season will extend into the summer.

A succession of 4 to 5 litters are produced annually, but in overpopulated areas, pregnant does may lose all their embryos through intrauterine resorption. Each litter usually produces three to seven kittens. Shortly before giving birth, the doe constructs a separate burrow known as a "stop" or "stab", generally in an open field away from the main warren. These breeding burrows are typically a few feet long and are lined with grass and moss, as well as fur plucked from the doe's belly. The breeding burrow protects the kittens from adult bucks and predators, and the nest lining protects them from hypothermia.

The gestation period of the European rabbit is 30 days, with the sex ratio of male to female kittens tending to be 1:1. Kittens born to the dominant buck and doe—which enjoy better nesting and feeding grounds—tend to grow larger and stronger and become more dominant than those born to subordinate rabbits. Not uncommonly, European rabbits mate again immediately after giving birth, with some specimens having been observed to nurse previous young while pregnant. Female European rabbits may become pregnant at three months of age, but do not reach their full reproductive ability until they are two years old, after which they remain able to reproduce for four more years. Bucks reach sexual maturity at four months of age.

Female European rabbits nurse their kittens once a night, for only a few minutes. After suckling is complete, the doe seals the entrance to the stop with soil and vegetation. In its native Iberian and southern French range, European rabbit young have a growth rate of 5 g (0.18 oz) per day, though such kittens in non-native ranges may grow 10 g (0.35 oz) per day. Weight at birth is 30–35 g (1.1–1.2 oz) and increases to 150–200 g (5.3–7.1 oz) by 21–25 days, during the weaning period. European rabbit kittens are born blind, deaf, and nearly naked. They are predisposed to seek out chemical signals produced by the lactating female to obtain the milk needed to survive, in particular the pheromone known as 2-methyl-2-butenal. The rabbits' ears do not gain the power of motion until 10 days of age. The eyes open 11 days after birth. At 15 days, the rabbits start eating hay and other food in the nest besides milk, and by 18 days, the kittens begin to leave the burrow. Young rabbits that are approaching sexual maturity but have not left the nest are often forcibly removed by dominant males.

=== Burrowing behaviour ===
The European rabbit's burrows occur mostly on slopes and banks, where drainage is more efficient. The burrow entrances are typically 10–50 cm (4–20 in) in diameter, and are easily recognizable by the bare earth at their mouths. Vegetation growth is prevented by the constant passing and repassing of the resident rabbits. Large burrows are complex excavations which may descend to depths of several feet. They are not constructed on any specified plan, and appear to be enlarged or improved as a result of activity over several generations. Kittens sleep in chambers lined with grass and fur, while adults sleep on the bare earth, likely to escape dampness. Warmth is secured by huddling.

Digging is done by pulling the soil backwards with the fore feet and throwing it between the hind legs, which scatter the material with kicking motions. While most burrows are dug from the outside, some warrens feature holes dug from the inside, which act as emergency exits when escaping from predators below ground. These holes usually descend perpendicularly to 1–1.2 m (3–4 ft), and their mouths lack the bare earth characteristic of burrow entrances. Although both sexes dig, does do so more skilfully and for longer periods.

=== Communication ===
The European rabbit is a relatively quiet animal, though it has at least two vocalizations. The best-known is a high treble scream or squeal. This distress call has been likened to the cry of a piglet, and is uttered when in extreme distress, such as being caught by a predator or trap. During the spring, bucks express contentment by emitting grunting sounds when approaching other rabbits. These grunts are similar to shrill hiccups, and are emitted with the mouth closed. Aggression is expressed with a low growl. Besides screaming or growling, European rabbits are known to honk, purr, and hiss. Young rabbits are far more vocal than adults; their vocalizations are thought to be indicators that they are ready to start suckling.

Non-verbal communication occurs within social groups of rabbits, particularly within warrens, via chinning or scent marking of objects and other rabbits by dominant group members. Rabbits may groom themselves using secretions from their glands or with substances such as saliva or urine to signal their sexual or reproductive status. Glands in the groin region appear to be particularly important for individual identification, as rabbits will use these secretions to identify other rabbits as unfamiliar. Both rabbits and hares are known to thump the ground with their feet to communicate the presence of threats, such as predators, or when they are stressed. A stressed rabbit may also grind its teeth, but the role of this behaviour in communication is unclear.

== Ecology ==
=== Habitat ===
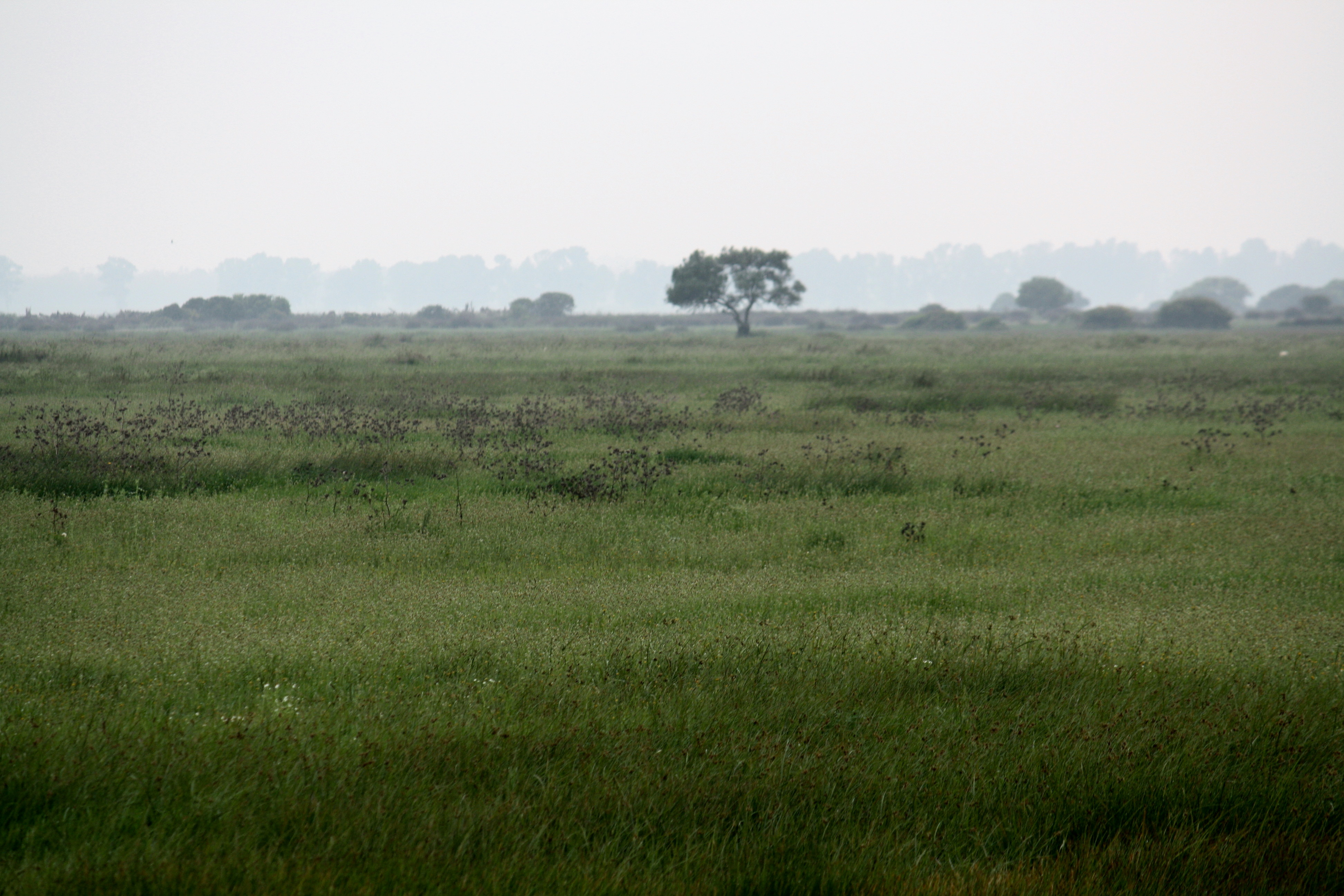
Grasslands in Doñana National Park, southern Spain, a favourable habitat for European rabbits to develop their warrens

The European rabbit's ideal habitat consists of short grasslands with secure refuge (such as burrows, boulders, hedgerows, scrub, and woodland) near feeding areas. The size and distribution of its burrow systems depend on the type of soil present. In areas with loose soil, it selects sites with supporting structures, such as tree roots or shrubs, to prevent burrow collapse. Warrens tend to be larger and to have more interconnected tunnels in areas with chalk than those in sand. In large coniferous plantations, the species only occurs on peripheral areas and along fire breaks and rides. In the rabbit's native range, it is strongly associated with Mediterranean shrubland. The European rabbit's grazing habits tend to promote its ideal open habitat via the dispersion of seeds and trimming of vegetation. In regions where the European rabbit is not native, the species is highly adaptive, preferring areas that have high amounts of vegetation and cover for escaping from predators. Rabbits can be found inhabiting steppes, forests, savannahs, and rocky outcrops in Argentina and south and central Chile, despite these not being preferred habitats.

=== Diet ===
The European rabbit eats a wide variety of herbage, especially grasses. It favours young leaves and shoots from nutritious species, particularly fescues. In cultivated areas, the rabbit's diet expands to various crops, including sugar beet, hay, and cereals. Winter wheat is preferred over maize and dicotyledons. The European rabbit generally grazes variably around its warren, creating a gradient of low vegetation and nutritional content closer to the burrow, where grazing is most intense, to high vegetation and available nutrition further away, where the rabbit is more exposed to predators and uses more energy to escape. The diet of a rabbit population is generally influenced by the available vegetation and competition from other herbivores; in areas with little competition, rabbits have been found to prefer endemic plant species over non-endemics. Hungry rabbits in winter may resort to eating bark on shrubs and young trees. Tree bark, seeds, and roots are examples of food items that the rabbit will forage in times of little food. Captive European rabbits in small breeding operations may be fed with freshly foraged vegetation, though most large-scale breeders provide rabbits with standardized feed in pellet form, formulated to provide a balance of fibre, starch and protein. Depending on the body's fat and protein reserves, a rabbit can survive without food in winter for about 2 to 8 days.

The European rabbit produces and ingests caecotropes, soft, mucus-covered pellets produced in the gastrointestinal tract. When food is first eaten, the rabbit is not able to completely break down the fibre and obtain the maximum amount of nutrition. In the region posterior to the colon in the hindgut, partially digested food is formed into soft pellets (caecotropes) filled with protein-rich bacteria, which pass to the rectum in glossy clusters. The rabbit swallows them whole, without breaking the enveloping membrane. Swallowed caecotropes are then fermented in the stomach before passing into the small intestine for nutrients to be absorbed; the indigestible matter is excreted as hard pellets at night. This behaviour is known as refection or caecotrophy, and is performed by all rabbits, hares, and pikas.

=== Predators ===
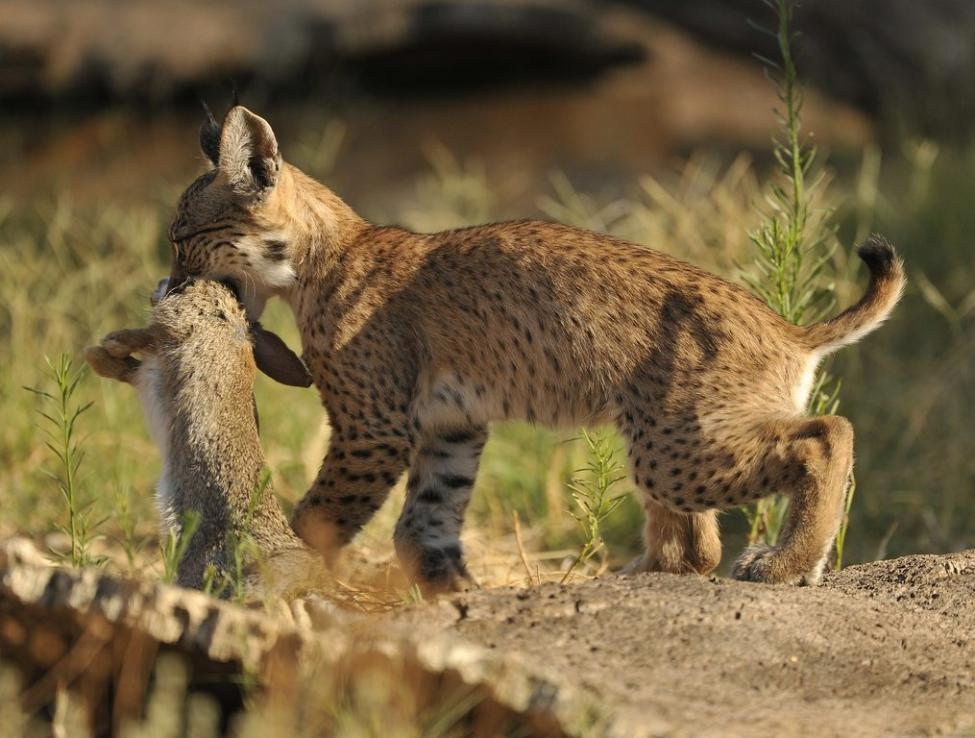
The Iberian lynx is a specialist predator of the European rabbit.

The European rabbit is prey to many different predatory species. Foxes, dingoes, wolves, lynxes, wolverines, and dogs kill both adult and young rabbits by stalking and surprising them in the open, but relatively few rabbits are caught this way, as they can quickly rush back to cover with a burst of speed. Both foxes and badgers will dig out kittens from shallow burrows; badgers are too slow to catch adult rabbits. Both wild and domestic cats can stalk and leap upon rabbits, particularly young specimens leaving their burrows for the first time. Wildcats take rabbits according to availability; in eastern Scotland, where rabbits are abundant, they can make up over 90% of the wildcats' diet. Most domestic cats are incapable of killing healthy, full-grown adults, but will take weak and diseased ones. Does can be fiercely protective of their kittens, having been observed to chase away large cats and mustelids, including ferrets, stoats, and weasels. However, rabbits typically run from mustelids, and may fear them innately. Cases are known of rabbits becoming paralysed with fear and dying when pursued by stoats or weasels, even when rescued unharmed. The European rabbit makes up 85% of the polecat's diet, and its availability is important to the success of breeding female mink. Brown rats are known to prey upon young rabbits; they will reside in rabbit burrows during the summer and attack them in groups.

Although many birds of prey are capable of killing rabbits, few are strong enough to carry them. Large species, such as golden and sea eagles, may carry rabbits back to their nests, while small eagles, buzzards, and harriers struggle to do so. Hawks and owls typically only carry off very small kittens. Due to its decline in the Iberian Peninsula, the Iberian lynx and Spanish imperial eagle, specialist predators of the European rabbit, have faced downturns in population. Ladder snakes will prey on juveniles.

In efforts to escape predators, the European rabbit will make use of its tail's white underside while fleeing to send signals to predators and other rabbits through tail flagging, a pursuit-deterrence signal. Right before fleeing, the display of a white tail warns a rabbit's relatives of potential danger. During escape, the tail display may serve two functions: one, as an honest signal, it indicates to a predator that the rabbit would be costly to catch; two, it may help to confuse the predator.

=== Diseases, parasites and immunity ===
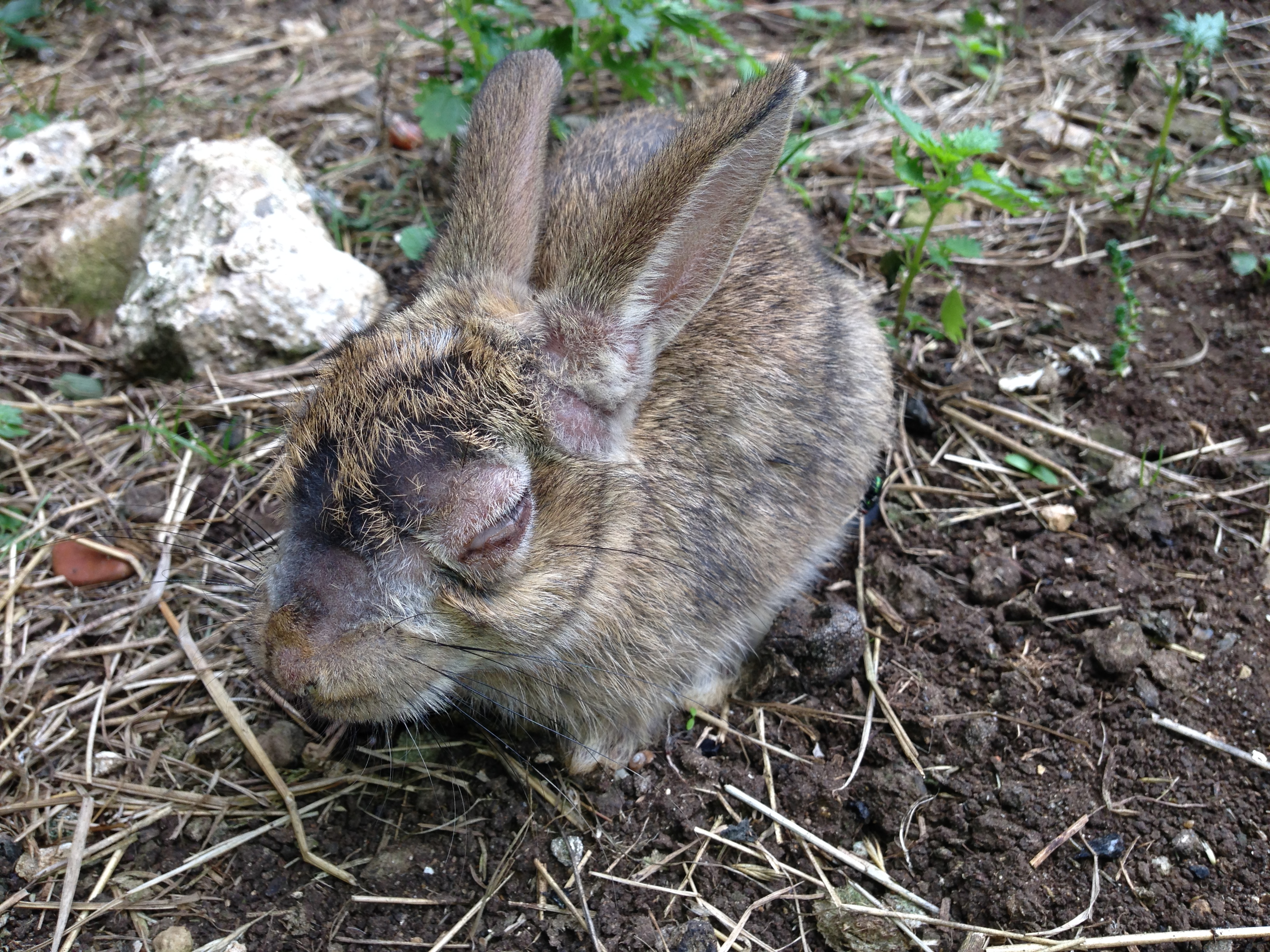
A rabbit displaying signs of myxomatosis

The European rabbit is the only species to be fatally affected by myxomatosis. The most lethal strain has a five-day incubation period, after which the eyelids swell and the inflammation quickly spreads to the base of the ears, the forehead, and nose. At the same time, the anal and genital areas also swell. During the last stages of the disease, the swellings discharge a fluid rich in viral material. Death usually follows on day 11 or 12. The primary carrier of myxomatosis varies based on location; in North America and Australia, it is carried by multiple species of mosquitoes, while in Britain its primary carrier is the rabbit flea (Spilopsyllus cuniculi).

Rabbit haemorrhagic disease (RHD) is an extremely contagious disease caused by the rabbit haemorrhagic disease virus (RHDV) that is largely specific to the European rabbit. It causes lesions of acute necrotizing hepatitis, disseminated intravascular coagulation, and haemorrhaging, mainly in the lungs. Susceptible specimens have a fatality rate of 70 to 95%. A variant of RHDV known as RHDV2 emerged in France in 2010. This strain is known to cause fatal infections in rabbits vaccinated against RHDV, and has since spread from France to other parts of Europe, Africa, and North America. The strain notably affects species besides the European rabbit, with fatal infections recorded in individual hares (Lepus), red rock hares (Pronolagus), riverine rabbits (Bunolagus), and cottontail rabbits (Sylvilagus).

The European rabbit has unique adaptations in its innate immune system due to a mutation in its CCR5 gene, which plays a part in inflammation and immune response. This mutation is derived from a gene conversion event in the related CCR2 gene; these adaptations are shared with rabbits in the genera Bunolagus and Pentalagus, which suggests a common ancestor that obtained this trait roughly 8 million years ago. Additionally, the European rabbit's adaptive immune system has significantly diverged from other tetrapods in the manner in which it employs immunoglobulin light chains. In one case, a unique additional disulfide bond was discovered between Cys 80 in Vκ and Cys 171 in Cκ, which has been suggested as serving to stabilize rabbit antibodies.

== Etymology ==
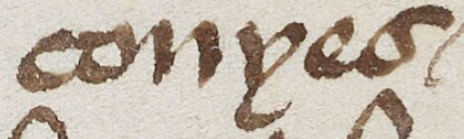
"Coneys" (written as conyes) in Chaucer's Parlement of Foules, from the Bodleian Library

Because of its origin outside of the British Isles, the species does not have a native name in English, with the usual terms coney and rabbit being foreign loanwords. The root word is the Walloon rabett, which was once commonly used in Liège. Rabett itself is derived from the Middle Dutch robbe, referring to a rabbit, with the addition of the suffix -ett. In the early 20th century, recorded pronunciations of rabbit included "rabbidge", "rabbert" (North Devon) and "rappit" (Cheshire and Lancashire). More archaic spellings include rabbette (15th–16th centuries), rabet (15th–17th centuries), rabbet (16th–18th centuries), rabatte (16th century), rabytt (17th century) and rabit (18th century).

The term coney or cony predates rabbit, and first occurred during the 12th century to refer to the animal's pelt. Later, coney referred to the adult animal, while rabbit referred to the young. The root of coney is the Old French connil or counil, of which the Norman was conin, plural coniz or conis. Connil comes from the Latin cuniculus. Its forerunner is the Greek κόνικλος (kóniklos), which first appeared around 204 BCE, as written in the Histories by Greek historian Polybius, though its origin is unclear: Aelian, who lived during the third century, linked the word to Celtiberian and later authors relate it to its Basque name unchi. The Roman scholars Varro and Pliny, who wrote in the first centuries BCE and CE respectively, connected it to cuneus, which refers to a 'wedge', thus making reference to the animal's digging ability. Both authors were apparently unaware of the word's non-Latin origin; the majority of Roman grammarians derived etymologies using only Greek and Latin. Some ambiguity also exists as rabbits and hares were referred to with the same words. At the time, hares were a much more important food source than were rabbits. Later study of the etymology of cuniculus has attested to its origin as a diminutive or adjectival form of the root word for 'dog' (cun–) in Celtiberian. The young of the rabbit are referred to as kittens in modern texts. A male rabbit is called a buck, as are male goats and deer, derived from the Old English bucca or bucc, meaning "he-goat" or "male deer", respectively. A female is called a doe, derived from the Old English dā, a word related to dēon, meaning "to suck".

The species' dwelling place is termed a warren or coney-garth. 'Warren' comes from the Old English wareine, itself derived from the Old French warenne, varenne, or garenne. The root word is the Low Latin warenna, which originally signified a preserve in general, only to be later used to refer specifically to an enclosure set apart for rabbits and hares. "Coney-garth" derives from the Middle English conygerthe, which may be a compound of connynge + erthe ('coney'+'earth'). The term stems from the Old French conniniere or coninyere, and later conilliere.

== Human relationships with rabbits ==
=== Origins ===
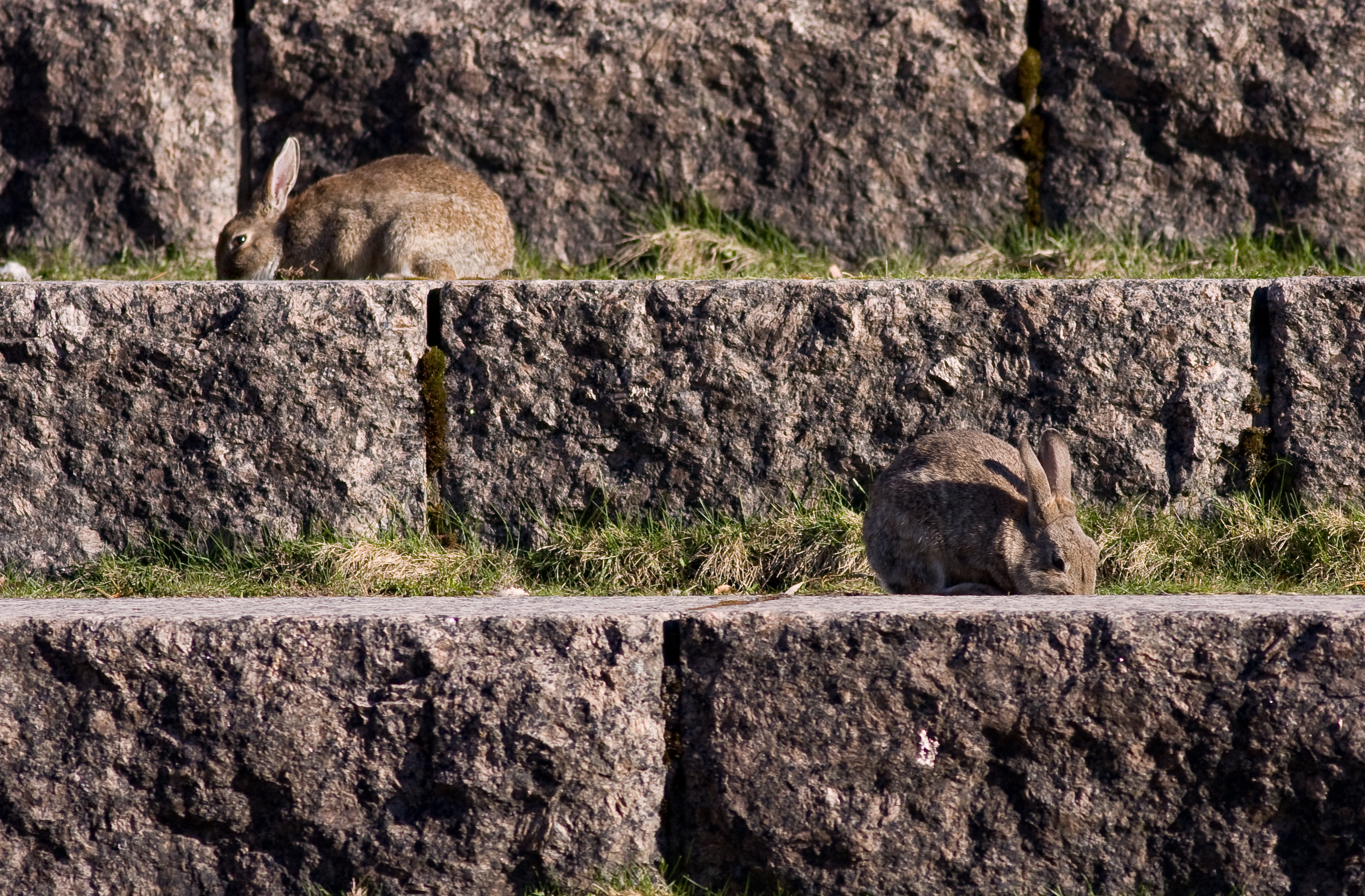
Two rabbits on the steps of the Finnish National Opera in Helsinki

Research in the late 20th century has shown that all European rabbits carry common genetic markers and descend from one of two maternal lines. These lines originated roughly 2 million years ago on the Iberian Peninsula and in southern France. Humans began hunting rabbits and hares in the Paleolithic period; these and other animals became more prominent in the human diet roughly 20,000 years ago. Rabbits were unfavourable prey to early humans due to their evasiveness and low fat-to-protein ratio, which could lead to protein toxicity (sometimes termed "rabbit starvation"). Despite these factors, during the Upper Paleolithic, rabbits, hares, and pikas made up most of the small animal prey hunted by humans throughout the Mediterranean and the Iberian Peninsula. Rabbits were used for more than just their meat by early humans; archaeological studies have found that their bones were used in needles and tubular ornaments, and their fur was likely used as well.

=== In culture ===
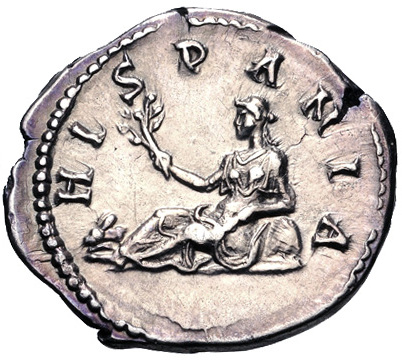
Obverse side of a denarius struck CE 134–138 during the reign of Hadrian. The personification of Hispania is seen with a rabbit at its feet.

European rabbits are seen both in contemporary and historical art as well as in folklore. Rabbits were associated with the Iberian peninsula when it was under Roman rule as the provinces of Hispania; several coins produced during the reign of Roman emperor Hadrian featured rabbits alongside the personification of Hispania. Rabbit warrens were described as undermining the ramparts of Tarraco by Pliny the Elder, who recommended a method of hunting rabbits with ferrets. The use of ferrets to hunt rabbits was still used in the 16th century, as described by English poet George Gascoigne. The English cleric Edward Topsell wrote on the European rabbit in his 1607 work The History of Four-footed Beasts, describing the species and its prevalence throughout England, as well as common beliefs about it, such as its uses in medicine: its brain was described as an effective antidote against poison, and the residue from a mixture of powdered rabbit and wine was thought to cure a sore throat.

=== Domestication ===
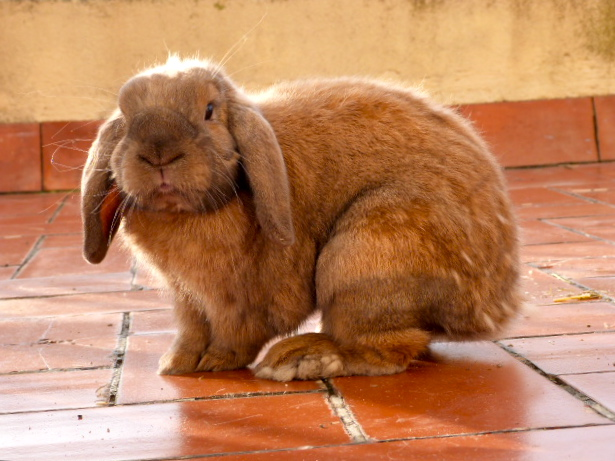
A domestic French Lop rabbit

The European rabbit is the only rabbit species to be widely domesticated, for meat, fur, wool, or as a pet. It was first widely kept in ancient Rome from the first century BCE, where Pliny the Elder described the use of rabbit hutches, along with enclosures called leporaria. These enclosures may have been intended more for hares rather than rabbits, however, as hares were a much more important food source—they were larger and provided more meat—and words for rabbits and hares at the time of ancient Rome referred to both species. In the present day, the European hare is still kept in captivity in some parts of Europe, though it faces stress, disease, and reproductive issues. The European rabbit has been refined into a wide variety of breeds during and since the emergence of animal fancy in the 19th century. Several breeds are widely used in research; the European rabbit is one of the first mammals to have its whole genome sequenced, and it has been important in the field of immune system research.

Selective breeding has been used since ancient times to produce rabbits with different characteristics, and while domestic rabbits are typically larger than wild rabbits, the various breeds of domestic rabbit exist in a range of sizes from "dwarf" to "giant". All rabbit breeds, from Netherland Dwarf to Flemish Giant, are descendants of the European rabbit. They have as much colour variation among themselves as other livestock and pet animals.

=== As pets ===
European rabbits have been kept as pets since the 1800s starting in the Victorian era, and Beatrix Potter wrote on the house rabbit in the 1900s. However, the public perception of the rabbit remained as that of a children's pet until the publication of Marinell Harriman's House Rabbit Handbook in 1985, after which their popularity grew significantly. The rabbit is the third most popular pet in the United Kingdom, and a 2024 survey found roughly 900,000 households with a pet rabbit in the United States. Adoptions in the United States increase significantly during Easter, though many rabbits adopted during this time are neglected, given to animal shelters, or abandoned.

In some urban areas, infestations of feral European rabbits descended from pets have become a problem. Helsinki, for example, is host to a notably persistent population of the species that originated from domestic rabbits released in the 1980s. Major infestations can have massive impacts on agriculture and biodiversity, and have been difficult to control through physical and biological means, such as that in Australia. Several attempts at extirpation, on the islands of Isola delle Femmine and Macquarie Island, have been successful.

=== Use for meat and fur ===
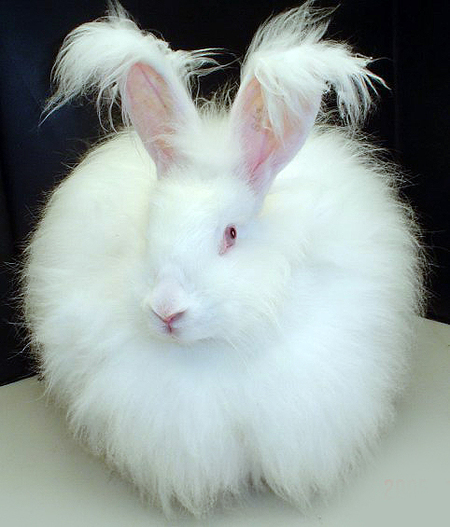
An Angora rabbit, bred for its fur

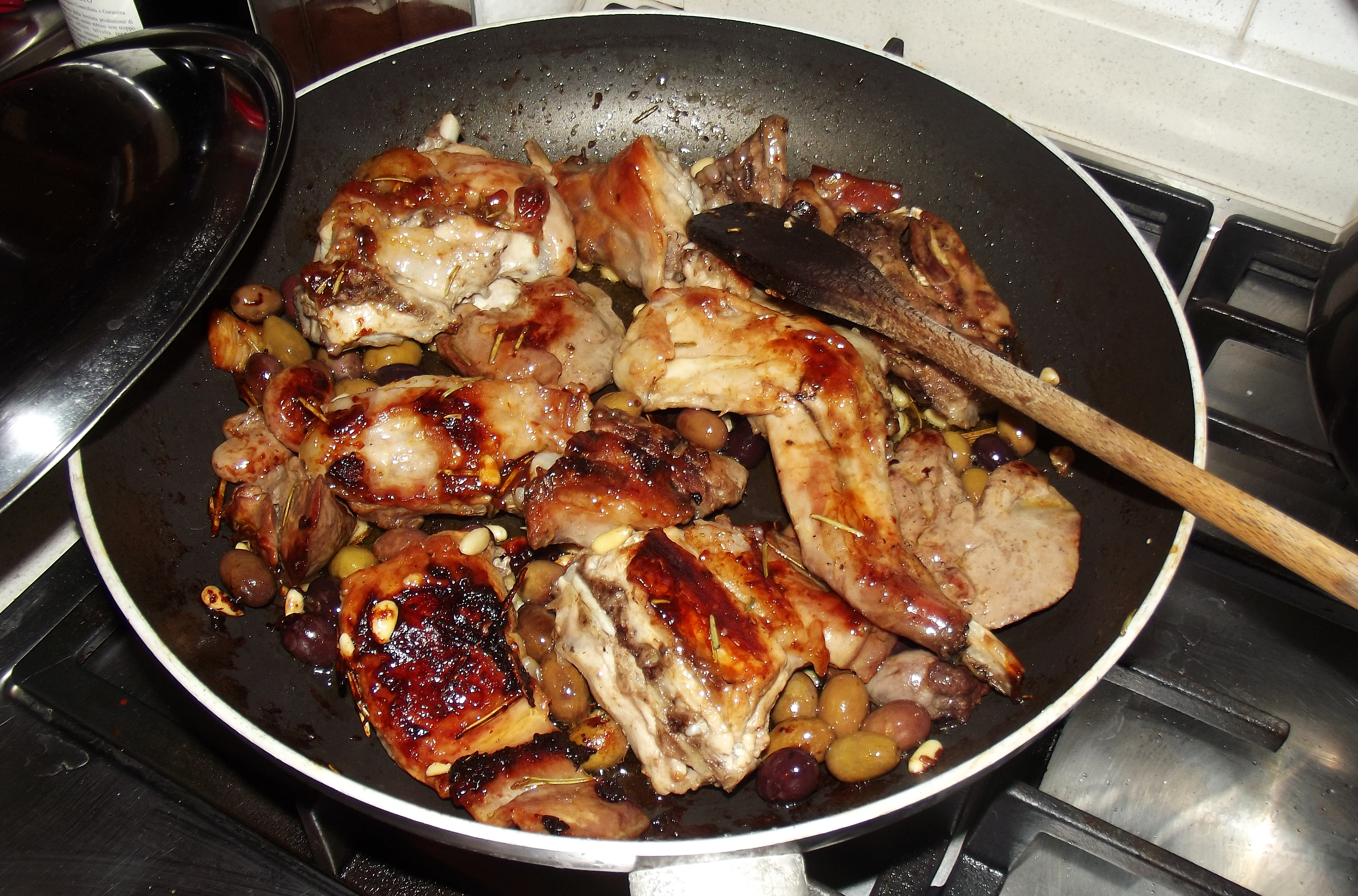
Coniglio alla ligure, an Italian rabbit-based dish

The European rabbit has been hunted in its native range since at least the Last Glacial Maximum roughly 20,000 years ago, and it continues to be a game animal. Much of the world's supply of rabbit meat comes from domestic rabbits. Over 4,000,000 tonnes (8.8×10^{9} lb) of rabbit meat was produced globally in 2024. Historically, rabbit was a popular food source in the United Kingdom for the poorer classes. Among wild rabbits, those native to Spain were reputed to have the highest meat quality, followed by those in the Ardennes. As rabbits hold very little fat, they were hardly ever roasted, being instead boiled, fried, or stewed.

William Marshall calculated in the 18th century that the value of the rabbit's skin in proportion to its carcass was greater than that of the sheep and ox. In the early 20th century, the pelt of the rabbit was seen as heavier and more durable than the hare's. Its fur was primarily used for felting or hats, and was also dyed or clipped, or sold as imitations of more valuable furbearers, such as fur seal. Development of rabbit breeds in the 21st century has caused meat and fur rabbits to become further separated. Some breeds of rabbit are bred for their fur, and others for their meat. Fur length varies depending on the breed. Large Angora rabbit breeds are raised for their long, soft fur, which is often spun into yarn. The Rex rabbit is raised for its smooth, velvet-like coat, with the hairs of its fur only measuring about 12 mm (0.47 in) long. There is no standard method for the tanning of rabbit skins. Skins are often used in gloves, footwear, linings and other garments, while yarn is used to make items such as blankets, hats, and thermal underwear. Compared to meat production, few statistics on rabbit fur and fiber production are known, though in 2014 France reported 70 million rabbit skins produced.

=== As an introduced species ===
The European rabbit has been introduced into several environments, often with harmful results to vegetation and local wildlife, making it an invasive species. The first known mention of the rabbit as an invasive species was made in regard to the introduction of the rabbit to the Balearic Islands after the Roman conquest of the first century BCE. According to both Strabo and Pliny the Elder, the multiplying rabbits caused famines by destroying crop yields and even collapsed trees and houses with their burrowing. The inhabitants petitioned Augustus for help, who sent troops to curb the rabbit population with the help of ferrets. This was possibly the first ever documented instance of an invasive species. The deliberate introduction of rabbits across Europe was common from the Middle Ages onwards, as the right to hunt or keep rabbits was used by monasteries, Norman dukes, and kings as a reward for services or to develop political allies. Rabbits were spread further as colonial powers developed across Europe, such as in the case of the Azores and Canary Islands, which were important strategic locations for Spanish and Portuguese ships on their way to the Americas.

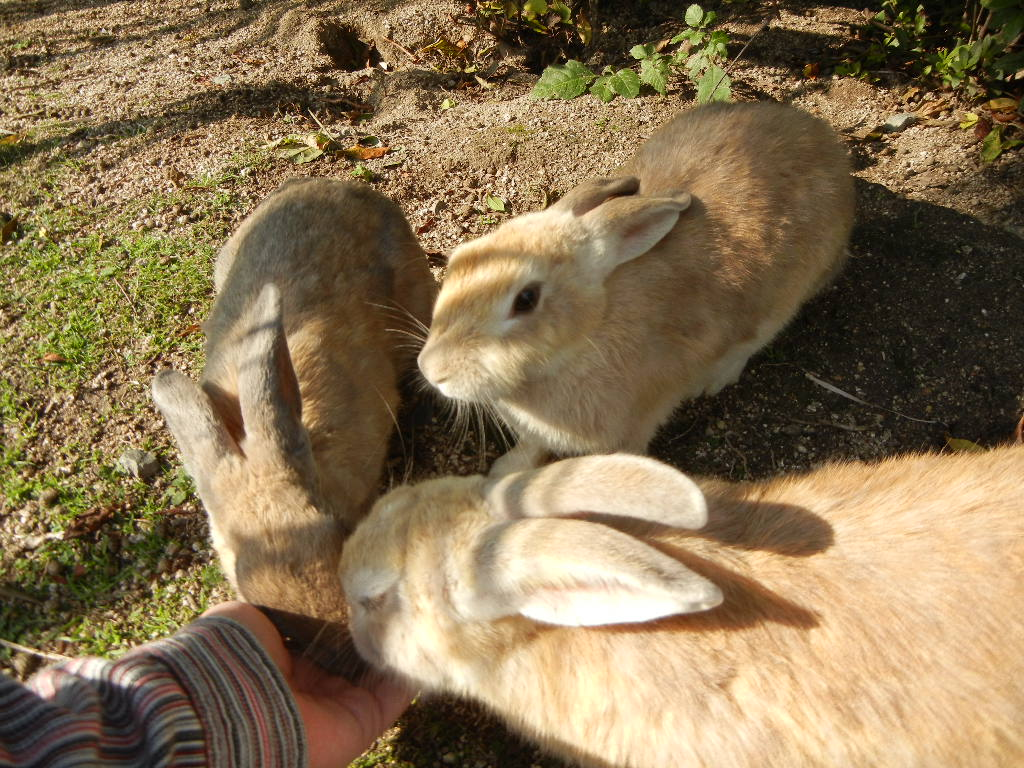
Feral domestic rabbits (O. c. domesticus) on the island of Ōkunoshima. The European rabbit was introduced and established a self-sustaining population in 1971 after a group of school children released 8 rabbits on the island.

Other locations where the European rabbit was introduced include Great Britain; two of the Hawaiian Islands (Laysan Island and Lisianski Island); Oceania's Macquarie Island; the island Ōkunoshima in Japan; Washington's Smith Island and San Juan Island (starting around 1900 and later spreading to the other San Juan Islands); Valle Nuevo National Park in the Dominican Republic in the 1950s; several islands off the coast of Southern Africa (including Robben Island); Australia; and New Zealand. In addition, the European rabbit has spread to at least 800 individual islands or island groups.

==== In the British Isles ====
The European rabbit is widespread in Great Britain, Ireland, and most other islands, except for Isles of Scilly, Rùm, Tiree, and some small Scottish islands, such as Gunna, Sanday, and most of the Treshnish Isles. One prominent theory is that the rabbit was first brought to Britain by the Normans after the 1066 conquest of England, as no pre-Norman British artistic or literary references to the animal are known. However, physical remains of rabbits have been found dating from the Roman conquest of Britain in the first century CE, indicating that Romans did introduce rabbits to the island, though likely not in great numbers. The rabbit was nonetheless scarce or absent throughout most of England following the Norman conquest, as warrens are not mentioned in the Domesday Book or any other 11th–century documents. Rabbits became well known, but not necessarily accepted members of British fauna between the 12th and 13th centuries. Evidence of their presence is found in a number of bones from the midden of Rayleigh Castle, which was occupied from the 11th–13th centuries. The first references to rabbits in Ireland occur roughly at the same time as English ones, thus indicating Norman introduction. They had become plentiful, probably at a local level, by the 13th century, as indicated by an inquisition of Lundy Island made in 1274 describing how 2,000 rabbits were caught annually. Subsequent allusions in official documents became more frequent, with the species later becoming an important food item at feasts.

Truly wild populations increased slowly, primarily in the coastal areas and lowland heaths of Breckland and Norfolk. There were notable population increases after 1750, when changes in agricultural practices created favourable habitats, and increasing interest in game management resulted in intensive predator control campaigns. Although now common in the Scottish lowlands, the species was little known in Scotland before the 19th century. Until then, it was confined to portions of the Edinburgh district at least as far back as the 16th century, certain islands and the coastal sand dunes of the Scottish mainland. Although unknown in Caithness in 1743, the species became well established there by 1793.

The infectious disease myxomatosis entered Britain from France in 1953, and reached Ireland by 1954, prompting the Royal Society for the Protection of Birds to set up "mercy squads" meant to euthanize myxomatous rabbits. Major myxomatosis outbreaks still occur in Britain, peaking twice annually: in spring and especially in late summer or autumn, though immunity has reduced the mortality rate from 99% to 5–33%.

Between 1996 and 2018, rabbit numbers fell by 88% in the east Midlands of England, 83% in Scotland, and 64% across the whole of the UK. Efforts have been made in these regions to encourage the preservation and development of safe rabbit habitats, as some arable pastures depend on rabbits' grazing habits to remain healthy.

==== In Australia and New Zealand ====
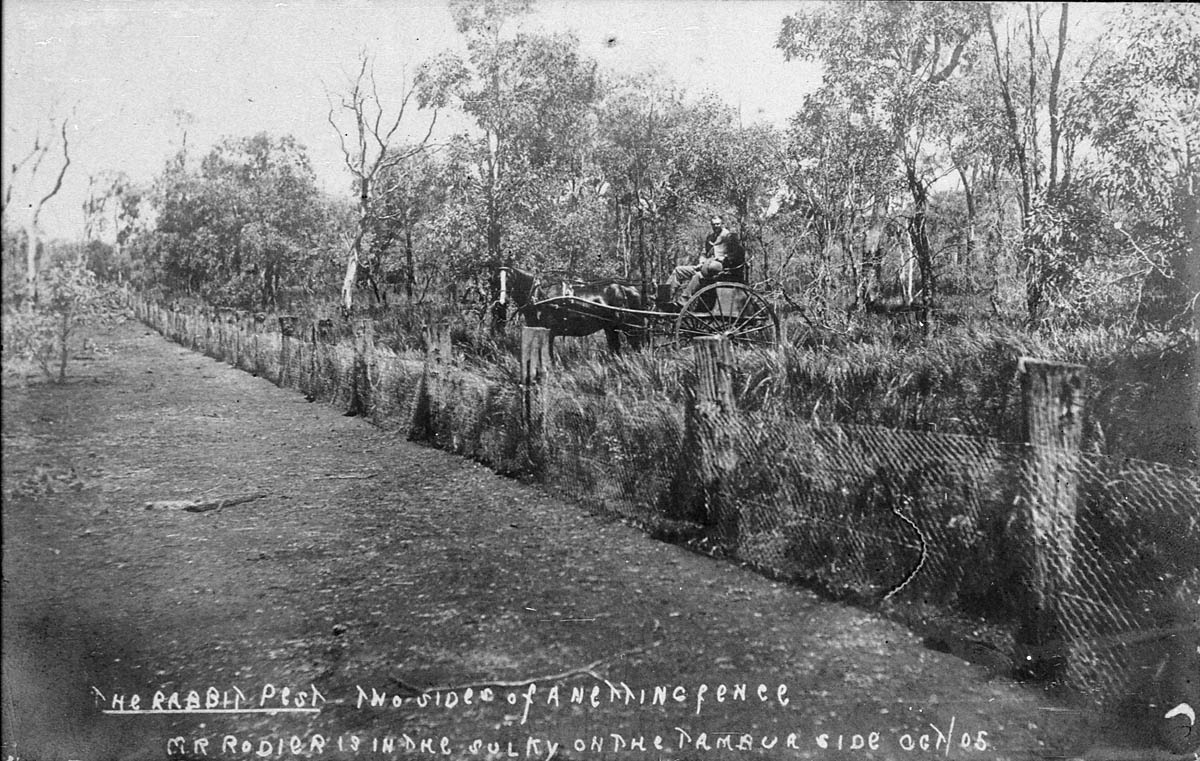
A rabbit-proof fence in Cobar, New South Wales. This photo was taken in 1905, when new fencing projects were spurred on by the devastating effects of rabbits on agriculture and ecology.

Though rabbits were first introduced to Australia in 1788 with the arrival of the First Fleet, the most significant population explosion occurred later on in the 19th century. Twenty-four European rabbits were introduced to Australia in 1859 by estate owner Thomas Austin in Victoria. These rabbits were introduced both for hunting purposes and to provide a sense of familiarity for colonists, allowing for the pastimes of sport shooting, coursing, and falconry. Rabbits were also introduced to New Zealand as a substitute for foxes in horseback hunting. Their descendants multiplied and spread throughout the country and caused severe agricultural damage and widespread ecological changes that contributed to the decline of native Australian species such as the greater bilby (Macrotis lagotis) and the southern pig-footed bandicoot (Chaeropus ecaudatus).

Between 1901 and 1907, Australia built an immense "rabbit-proof fence" to halt the westward expansion of the infestation. The European rabbit, however, can not only jump very high, but also burrow underground, and this fence failed to protect from rabbit infestation; despite this, further fencing projects were undertaken that also failed to control the spread of rabbits in Australia.

During the 1950s, the intentional introduction of the Myxoma virus, which causes myxomatosis, provided some relief in Australia, but not in New Zealand, where the insect vectors necessary for the spread of the disease were not present. Myxomatosis can also infect pet rabbits. Today's remaining feral rabbits in Australia are largely immune to myxomatosis. A strain of a second deadly rabbit virus, rabbit haemorrhagic disease virus (RHDV), was imported to Australia in 1991 as a biological control agent and was released accidentally in 1995, killing millions of rabbits. The virus has been developed further to address changes in environment and population, with a Korean variant referred to as K5 being released throughout Australia in 2017. RHDV was also introduced—illegally—in New Zealand with less success due to improper timing.

==== In South America ====
The exact date on which the European rabbit was introduced into Chile is unknown, though the first references to it occur during the mid-18th century. By the 19th century, several authors referred to the presence of both rabbits and rabbit hutches in central Chile. The importation and breeding of rabbits was encouraged by the state, as rabbits were seen as cheap sources of food for peasants. Whether or not their escape into the wild was intentional is unknown, but warnings over the dangers of feral rabbits were raised during the early 20th century and the species had propagated dramatically by the late 1920s in central Chile, Tierra del Fuego, and the Juan Fernández Islands. In the 1930s, the state sought to tackle the rabbit problem by banning fox hunting, though it was later discovered that indigenous South American foxes rarely preyed on rabbits, preferring native species. In modern times, the European rabbit problem has not been resolved definitively, though a deliberate outbreak of myxomatosis in Tierra del Fuego successfully reduced local rabbit populations. The species remains a problem in central Chile and on Juan Fernández, despite years-long hunting projects.

European rabbits cause ecological damage in Chile by uprooting vegetation with long regeneration cycles and overgrazing across large areas, reducing biodiversity. Rabbit burrows directly increase the risk of erosion. Where rabbits cannot burrow, such as along the Chilean coast, they use the nests of other animals, which has led to nesting failures in seabirds. Because burrowing is tied to the rabbit's reproduction, destroying burrows has been one of a few effective means of population control. Since its introduction into Chile, the European rabbit has spread into Argentina and Uruguay. In other Central and South American countries, there are no reported feral populations. Cuniculture is widespread, but there is a lack of standardized information or statistics across countries.

==== In Ukraine ====
The two accounts over the introduction of rabbits in Ukraine are conflicting. One holds that the species was brought there in the early 20th century by the Austrian nobleman, Graf Malokhovsky, who released them on his estate near the Khadzhibey Estuary, while another holds that rabbits were first brought to Kherson from Switzerland in 1894 or 1895 by landowner Pinkovsky. Since the 1980s, many populations of rabbits in the country have since declined or become extinct. Early populations introduced to the outskirts of Odesa were reported to have spread to a range spanning 300 kilometres (190 mi) in diameter by 1923, and by the peak of the rabbits' populations in 1980, they were reported as living among abandoned tenements and caves across the Odesa, Ternopil, Kherson and Crimea regions. Around this period, the total population of rabbits in Ukraine was estimated at 15 to 20 thousand individuals. Epidemics of myxomatosis starting in 1981 caused the gradual extinction of many colonies across the country; while other diseases such as tularemia or rabbit haemorrhagic disease may be responsible for some deaths, diagnoses almost always pointed to myxomatosis. Strains of the myxoma virus engineered in France to control populations in western Europe may have been responsible, having been transmitted east by ticks and fleas. State reports in 2016 indicated that only 100 to 300 rabbits were left in the country.

=== Conservation status ===
Though the European rabbit thrives in many of the locations where it was introduced, within its native range in Iberia, populations are dwindling. In 2005, the Portuguese Institute for Nature Conservation and Forests classified O. cuniculus in Portugal as "near threatened", while in 2006, Spanish authorities (SECEM) reclassified it in Spain as "vulnerable". In 2018, the International Union for Conservation of Nature reclassified O. cuniculus in Spain, Portugal, and France as "endangered", due to the extent of recent declines. The IUCN assessment of the species considers only those populations within its natural distribution, and as such it was considered endangered in their 2019 evaluation. It was noted as being both an important game species and an agricultural pest, and continuation of population management and monitoring plans were recommended. Hundreds of thousands of European rabbits have been released in Spain and France as part of reintroduction efforts, though these were not particularly successful in increasing rabbit populations. Remediation of abandoned land that had been overtaken by forest and scrubland was also recommended, as these encroachments contributed to habitat fragmentation and loss in regions where the rabbit was once abundant. The species was later reassessed by the IUCN within its European range in a 2025 publication; based on new information on subspecies population trends, a classification of "near threatened" was given. Within their native ranges, stable and positive population trends were noted for the common rabbit (O. c. cuniculus), while negative trends continued for the Iberian rabbit (O. c. algirus); future separate assessments have been suggested for the two subspecies.

== See also ==
- Cuniculture, on the practice of breeding and raising domesticated European rabbits
- List of breeds of the domesticated European rabbit
