= Fetal resorption =

Disintegration and assimilation of fetus in the uterus

Fetal resorption (also known as fetus resorption) is the disintegration and assimilation of one or more fetuses in the uterus at any stage after the completion of organogenesis, which, in humans, is after the ninth week of gestation. Before organogenesis, the process is called embryo resorption. Resorption is more likely to happen early on in the gestation than later on; a later death of a fetus is likely to result in a miscarriage.

== In rodents ==
Fetal resorption in rats is common. Non-viable concepti are generally resorbed instead of being aborted (miscarriage) like in humans. Factors that make it more common, sometimes to the point of infertility, include:

- Vitamin E deficiency. In fact, this class of vitamin was originally identified by its lack causing infertility in rats. A deficiency of many other vitamins as well as some minerals such as copper can also cause fetal resorption.
- Administration of antiestrogens, removal of ovaries.
- Various other drugs or toxins including trypan blue and sweet peas.
- Inflammation caused by e.g. lipopolysaccharide, interleukin 4, and interleukin 12.

== In canines ==
In 1998, an ultrasound study found that the resorption of one or two conceptuses happen in up to 10% of all dog pregnancies, although many cases of assumed complete resorption of an entire litter are likely to have just been the bitch experiencing a pseudopregnancy.

== See also ==
- Vanishing twin syndrome
- Lithopedion, calcified body of a dead fetus
