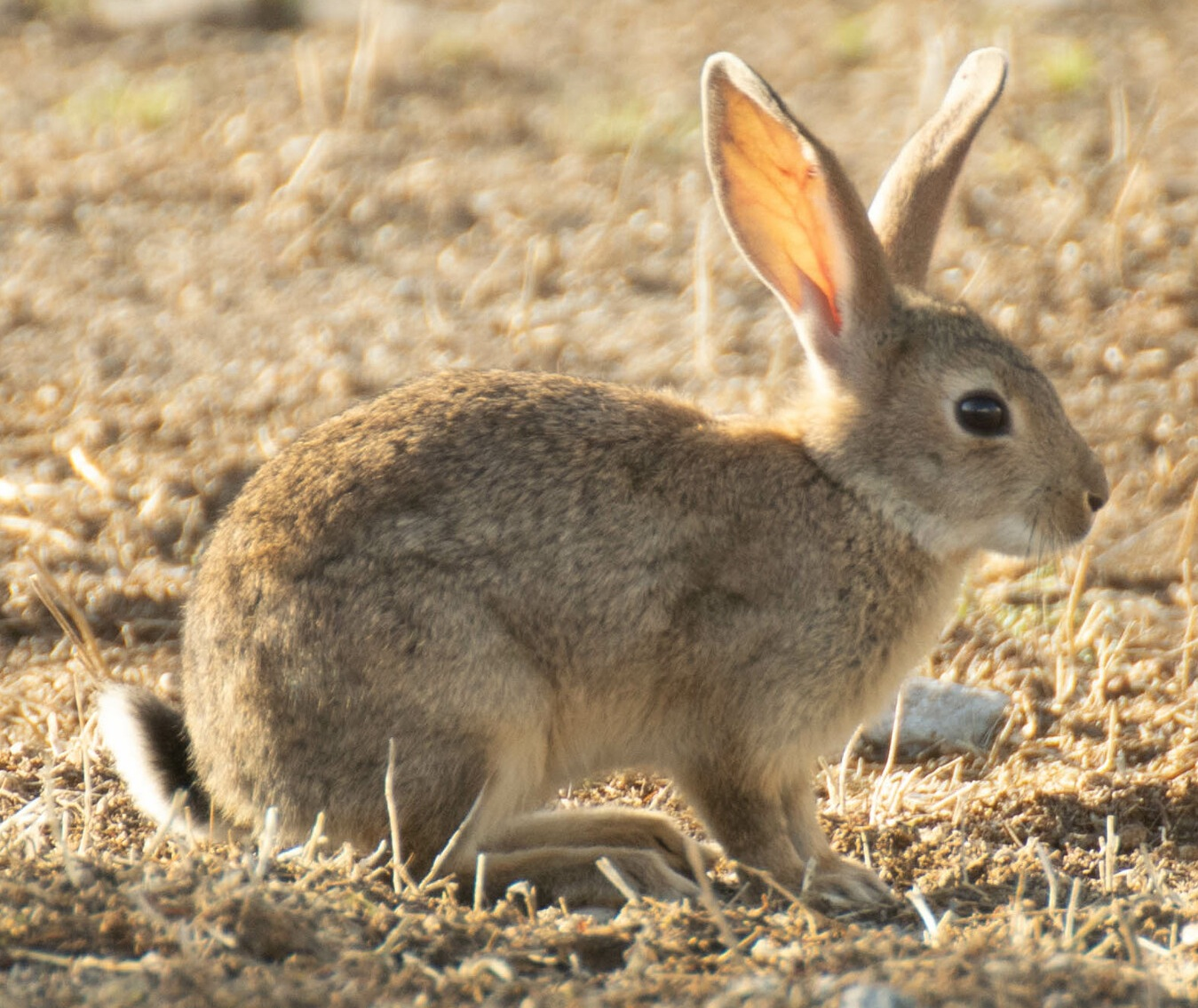
- European rabbit (Oryctolagus cuniculus)

Scientific classification
- Kingdom: Animalia
- Phylum: Chordata
- Class: Mammalia
- Infraclass: Placentalia
- Order: Lagomorpha
- Family: Leporidae
- Genus: Oryctolagus; Lilljeborg, 1873

Type species
- Lepus cuniculus Linnaeus, 1758

Species
- 1 living, several extinct (see text)

= Oryctolagus =

Oryctolagus Temporal range: 6.5–0 Ma Late Miocene–Recent

Genus of mammals

Oryctolagus (/ˌɔːrɪkˈtɑːləɡəs/) is a genus of lagomorph that today contains the European rabbit and its descendant, the domestic rabbit, as well as several fossil species.

The generic name derives from Ancient Greek: ὀρυκτός (oryktos, “dug up”) and λαγώς (lagōs, “hare”).

== Evolution ==
Oryctolagus first appeared at the end of the Miocene, around 6.5 million years ago . Fossil remains from the middle Pliocene led to the recognition of two species, Oryctolagus lacosti in southern France and northwestern Italy and Oryctolagus laynensis in the Iberian Peninsula. This latter form is thought to be the origin of the extant species.

== Species ==
- Oryctolagus cuniculus - European rabbit
  - Oryctolagus cuniculus domesticus - Domestic rabbit

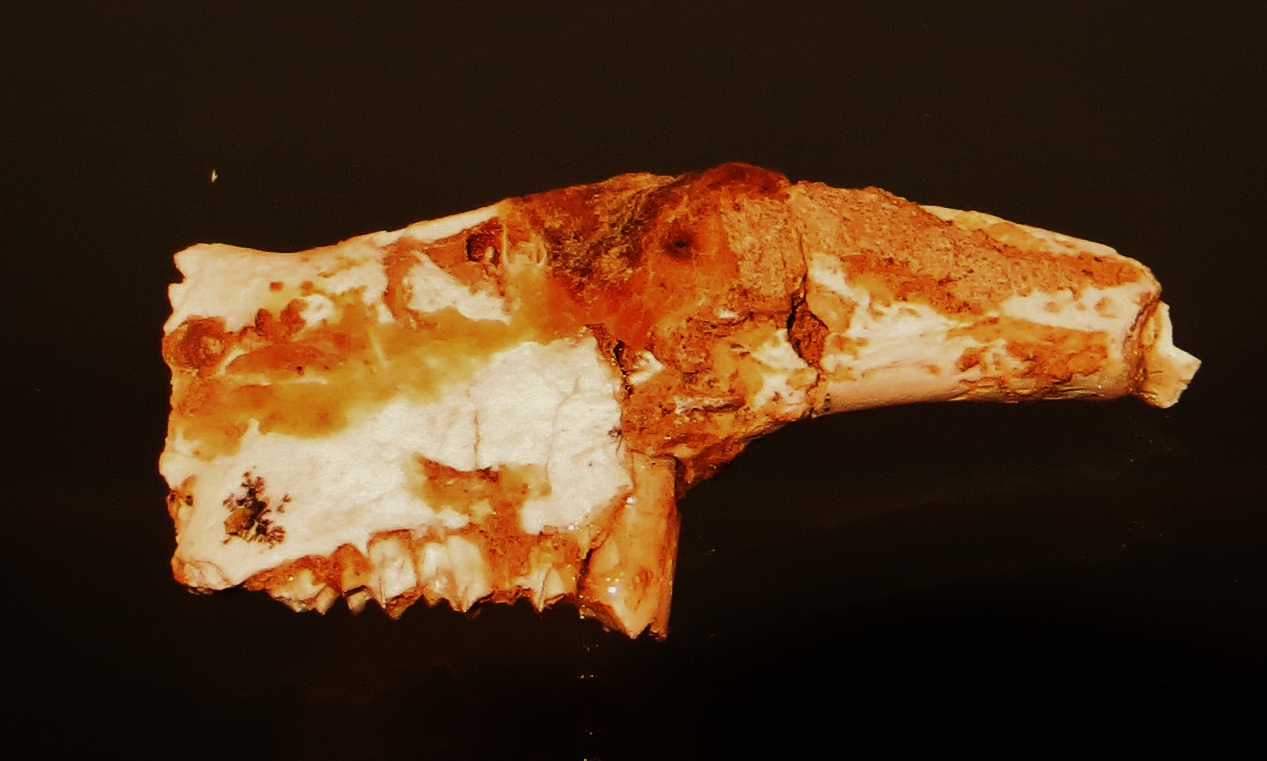
Lower jaw of O. lacosti.

- †Oryctolagus laynensis - Spain, Late Pliocene
- †Oryctolagus lacosti - France, Late Pliocene to Early Pleistocene
- †Oryctolagus giberti - Spain, France, and Portugal, Early Pleistocene
- †Oryctolagus valdarnensis - Italy, Early Pleistocene
