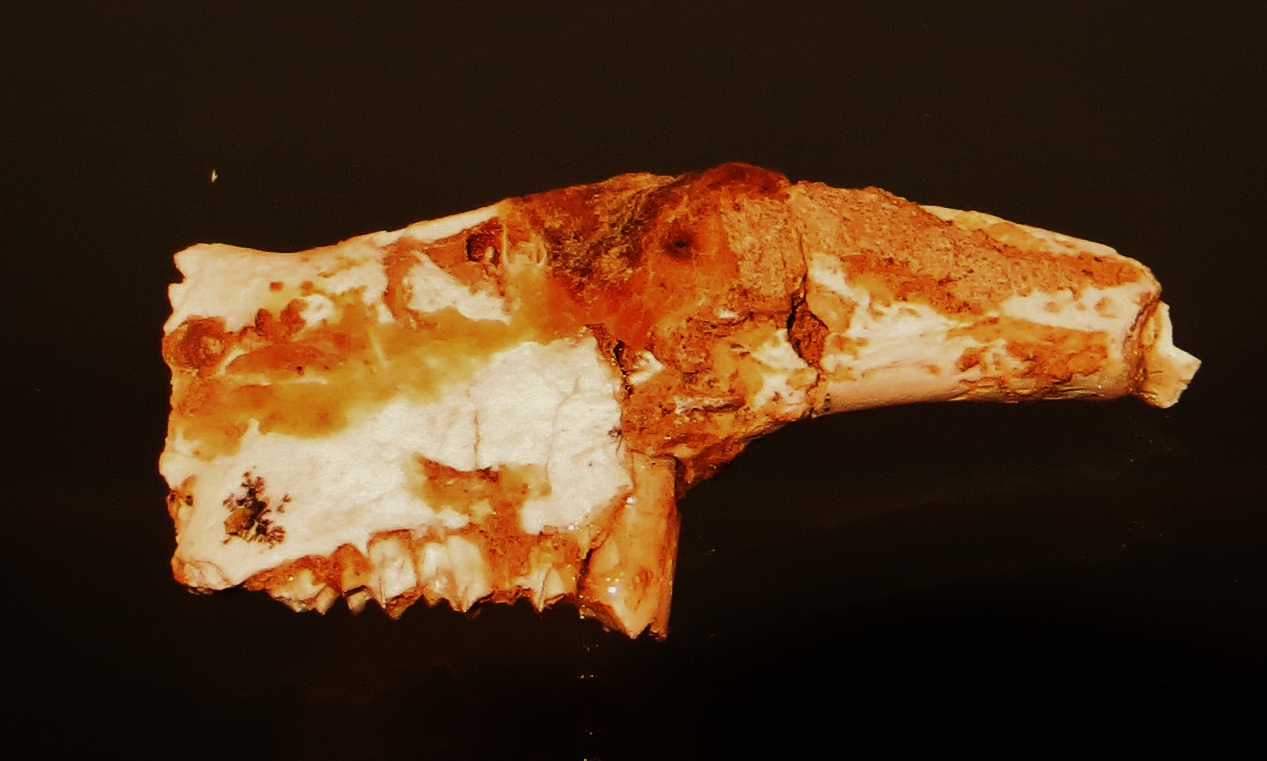
- Jawbone of O. lacosti

Scientific classification
- Kingdom: Animalia
- Phylum: Chordata
- Class: Mammalia
- Order: Lagomorpha
- Family: Leporidae
- Genus: Oryctolagus
- Species: †O. lacosti

Binomial name
- †Oryctolagus lacosti (Pomel, 1853)

= Oryctolagus lacosti =

Oryctolagus lacosti Temporal range: Late Pliocene

Extinct species of rabbit

Oryctolagus lacosti is an extinct species of large rabbit from the Late Pliocene of France. It is closely related to the living European rabbit.

== Description ==
This species is known for being much larger than its living relative, comparable in size to hares of the genus Lepus. Despite being comparable in size to the living brown hare, its lower incisor shape and limb proportions match those of the living Oryctolagus, confirming its position as a rabbit rather than a hare.
