= Bering Sinkhole =

Early American archaeological site

Bering Sinkhole is an early American archaeological site in Kerr County, Texas. The mortuary sinkhole included human remains of 62 individuals, animal remains, and turtle-shell, marine-shell, antler and stone artefacts. Radiocarbon dating found that the earliest burials were from approximately 5000 BC.

The natural limestone sinkhole on the Edwards Plateau was used as a burial place for 5,500 years by hunter-gatherers of the Llano River basin. Sinkholes are relatively common in the karst regions of Texas. The cavern at the base of the sinkhole is largely inaccessible without ladders or special equipment, so it is likely that bodies were simply dropped in the hole from the surface, and sometimes roughly covered by large limestone rocks. Similar mortuary sinkhole sites include Seminole Sink, Mason Ranch Sinkhole, and Hitzfelder Cave, and Cueva de la Candelaria in northern Mexico.

The sinkhole was discovered and initially excavated with heavy equipment by the land owner in the mid to late 1980s; upon discovery of human skulls and what was later identified as a wolf's spinal column, the land owner contacted archeologists at the University of Texas. More than 25 types of animal remains were found in the sinkhole including bison, badger, armadillo, coyote, gray wolf, domestic dog and hog-nosed skunk. One of the human bodies deposited in the sinkhole was found to have what was likely a lithopedion, or stone baby, the rare obstetric circumstance of a dead fetus calcifying within the mother's living body. The lithopedion dates to approximately 1100 BC and is the earliest documented case of a human lithopedion.

== See also ==
- List of sinkholes
- Devil's Sinkhole State Natural Area
