= Vanishing twin =

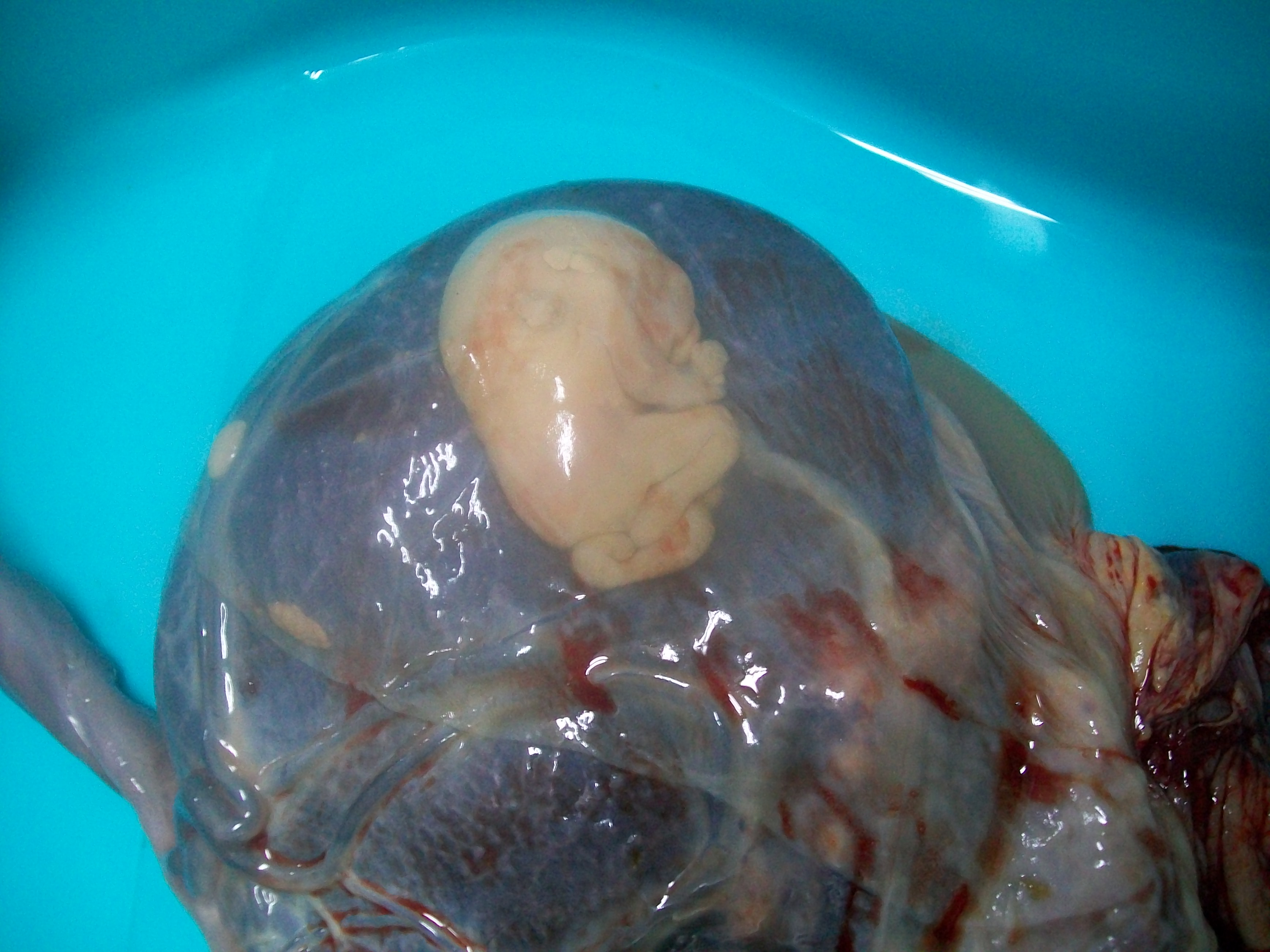
- A fetus papyraceus shown with its umbilical cord next to the placenta of its dichorionic diamniotic twin
- Specialty: Obstetrics and gynaecology
- Risk factors: Superfetation (in twin pregnancy)

A vanishing twin, also known as twin resorption, is a fetus in a multigestation pregnancy that dies in utero and is then partially or completely reabsorbed. In some instances, the dead twin is compressed into a flattened, parchment-like state known as fetus papyraceus.

Vanishing twins occur in up to one of every eight multifetus pregnancies and may not even be known in most cases. "High resorption rates, which cannot be explained on the basis of the expected abortion rate, suggest intense fetal competition for space, nutrition, or other factors during early gestation, with frequent loss or resorption of the other twin(s)." Vanishing twin syndrome has been characterized as the loss of a twin before 12 weeks of gestation, or early during the first trimester where it is uncommon for twin pregnancy to have been identified.

According to Boklage, most twin pregnancies are ultimately born as singles, and vanished twins are a possible source of abnormal cells. In one study, Boklage reported of 325 twin pregnancies, finding that only 61 ended as twins, with 125 ending as singletons; the remainder were lost. He has estimated that for every twin pair born, there are six singletons who survived a twin conception.

In pregnancies achieved by in vitro fertilization, "it frequently happens that more than one amniotic sac can be seen in early pregnancy, whereas a few weeks later there is only one to be seen and the other has 'vanished'".

== See also ==
- Chimera (genetics)
- Mosaicism
- Parasitic twin
- Runt
