= Johann Georg Steigerthal =

German physician (1666–1740)

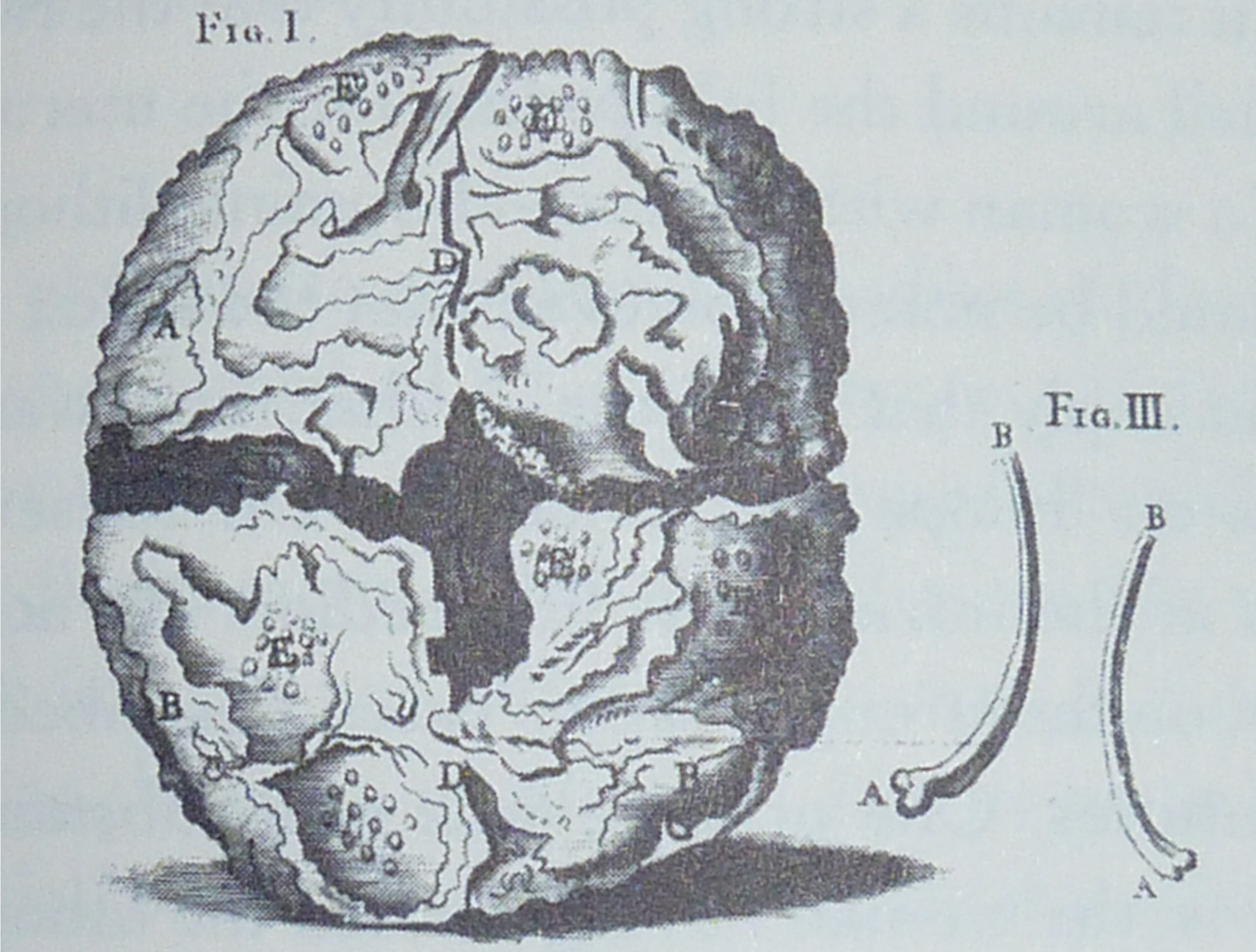
Illustration from Steigerthal's account of the Leinzell lithopedion.

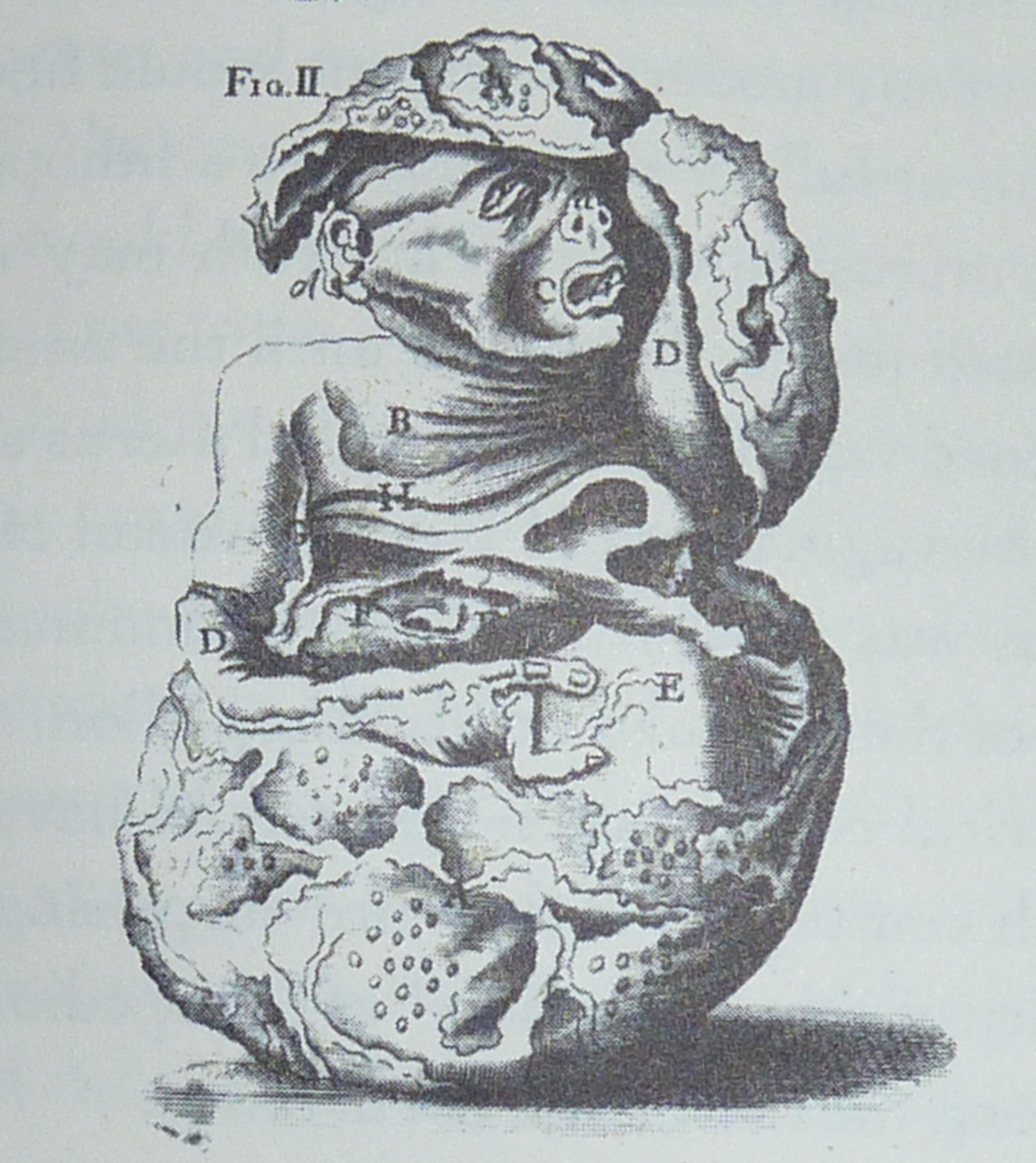
Illustration from Steigerthal's account of the Leinzell lithopedion.

Johann Georg Steigerthal (2 February 1666, Nienburg - 27 June 1740, Hanover) was a court physician and medical writer.

== Life ==
Steigerthal was one of the sons of Johann Georg Steigerthal senior, a city-preacher and later superintendent of Nienburg, and his wife Catharina Ursula Wessling. He studied medicine at Helmstedt in 1684, Leiden from 1688 and Utrecht from 1689. He graduated in 1690 and became professor of medicine at Helmstedt in 1703. He was elected a member of the Royal Society of London in 1714, the same year as the elector of Hanover became George I of Great Britain. In 1715 he became court physician and personal physician to George in Hanover.

Steigerthal wrote the first description of the lithopedion removed from Anna Mullern at Leinzell in 1720. In 1723 the President of the Royal Society Hans Sloane sent Steigerthal (then in Bad Pyrmont with George I) to Lemgo to buy Engelbert Kaempfer's east Asian collection - like the rest of Sloane's collection, it later became part of the foundational deposit of the British Museum.

In 1730 Steigerthal discovered a petroleum well in Linden, now a district of Hanover - a street has been named after him there since 1927. In 1732 Steigerthal carried out one of the first successful vaccination programmes in England and was also appointed to the 'Hofrat' or privy council of Hanover.

== Works ==
- De medicamentorum noxis, Diss. 1690
- De matheseos et philosophiae naturalis utilitate in arte medica oratio, 1702
- De aquarum mineralium praestantia programma quod praelectionibus publicis de thermis et acidulis praemittit J. G. Steigerthal, 1703
