= Oryctolagus giberti =

Oryctolagus giberti Temporal range: Calabrian

Scientific classification
- Kingdom: Animalia
- Phylum: Chordata
- Class: Mammalia
- Order: Lagomorpha
- Family: Leporidae
- Genus: Oryctolagus
- Species: O. giberti

Binomial name
- Oryctolagus giberti De Marfà, 2008

Extinct species of Oryctolagus

Oryctolagus giberti is an extinct species of rabbit belonging to the genus Oryctolagus that lived in Europe during the Calabrian stage of the Pleistocene epoch.

== Etymology ==
The specific epithet of Oryctolagus giberti references the palaeontologist Josep Gibert i Clols, who studied for years the fossils found at Cueva Victoria, where the holotype of O. giberti was discovered.

== Distribution ==
O. giberti fossil remains are only known to have been unearthed from Early Pleistocene deposits in France and Spain.

== Palaeobiology ==
=== Palaeoecology ===
Accumulations of the bones of this lagomorph species at Sima del Elefante have been attributed to predation by lynxes, as well as Eurasian eagle-owls and western barn owls.
