= Mortuary cave =

Type of burial place

== Definition ==
A mortuary cave or a mortuary sinkhole, alternately known as burial cave, burial sinkhole, or crevice interment, is a naturally formed cavity in the earth that is intentionally used for the placement of human remains. Unlike constructed tombs or graves, mortuary caves utilize pre-existing geological formation such as limestone caves, sinkholes and rock fissures. Archeological evidence has demonstrated that mortuary caves were used across multiple continents and time periods, ranging from prehistoric contexts to historic events. These sites are of particular importance in archaeology because cave environments often preserve human remains and associated artifacts more effectively than open-air burial sites do, while also providing strong ties to cultural and ritualistic practice surrounding death.

== Archaeological Context and Preservation ==
Mortuary caves are most commonly found in karst landscapes, where soluble rock such as limestone tends to form caves and sinkholes. Because these natural cavities are already present in the landscape and do not require human construction, archaeologists are able to distinguish mortuary caves from accidental cave deaths or natural deposition by examining the arrangement of skeletal remains, the presence of burial bundles, and associated burial artifacts such as tools, ornaments or textiles.

Environmental conditions within caves can contribute to the notable preservation of remains and artifacts. Providing stable temperatures, limited sunlight, and reduced disturbance may slow decomposition, allowing organic materials to survive longer. At the Bering Sinkhole in Texas, archeologists recovered the remains of multiple individuals along with associated artifacts, demonstrating a repeated and intentional mortuary use over an extended time period.

== North America ==
Mortuary caves and sinkholes have been documented in several regions of North America.

=== Texas ===
In Texas, a number of known Paleoindian mortuary sinkholes have been identified, including the Bering Sinkhole.

=== Virginia ===
In Virginia, mortuary caves such as the Bull Thistle Cave Archaeological Site contain human remains which have been recovered from cave shafts and chambers, reflecting burial practices and rituals during the Woodland-period.

=== Alaska ===
The use of mortuary caves has also been documented in Alaska. In the Western Aleutian islands, archaeologists identified a burial cave containing human remains and artifacts. Radiocarbon dating and analysis of the skeletal remains indicated intentional placement with the cave solely for mortuary purposes, providing insight into the indigenous burial traditions located in subarctic environments.

=== Hawaii ===
In Hawaii, cultural resources surveys conducted at Kalaeloa Heritage Park documented skeletal remains residing within natural sinkholes, indicating their use of a burial method during Pre-Colonial Hawaii.

=== Historical Period: Civil War ===
During the American Civil War, the bodies of 30 Union soldiers that were killed at the Battle of Wilson's Creek were temporarily placed in a natural sinkhole and were later relocated to Springfield National Cemetery.

== Africa ==
=== Rising Star Cave System ===
Skeletal remains of Homo naledi were found in the Rising Star Cave system, estimated to be up to 335,000 years old. Both partial and intact remains have been found deep in the cave, with researchers estimating that the partial remains had been dropped down a long, narrow part of the cave dubbed “the Chute”. The intact remains are thought to have been brought into the cave and placed there, some even having been placed into man-made divots in the cave floor. Drawings and other potential grave goods have been found in the vicinity of the burials to suggest this may be one of the first instances of intentional funerary practices.

== See also ==
- Aveline's Hole
