= Embryo loss =

Early pregnancy loss during the embryo's development

Embryo loss (also known as embryo death) is the death of an embryo at any stage of its development which in humans, is between the second through eighth week after fertilization. Failed development of an embryo often results in the disintegration and assimilation of its tissue in the uterus, known as embryo resorption. Loss during the stages of prenatal development after organogenesis of the fetus generally results in the similar process of fetal resorption or miscarriage. Embryo loss often happens without an awareness of pregnancy, and an estimated 40 to 60% of all embryos do not survive.

== Moral status ==
There is considerable debate about the moral status of human embryos. These debates are important in relation to abortion and IVF. Some argue that fetuses have the same moral status as infants, children, and adults. However, critics claim that this view is morally inconsistent due to the frequency of embryo loss/miscarriage/spontaneous abortion in general population. Some say that the debate ignores an important biological feature of human embryos, the fact that most human embryos die, before even doctors know they exist.

== Fertility clinics ==
Within fertility clinics embryo loss is associated with a high number of implanted embryos. The keeping of embryos in tanks can also increase risks of loss in instances where technical malfunctions can occur.

== See also ==
- Perinatal death
- Reproductive loss
- Early pregnancy loss
