= Oryctolagus laynensis =

Oryctolagus laynensis Temporal range: Early Pleistocene

Scientific classification
- Kingdom: Animalia
- Phylum: Chordata
- Class: Mammalia
- Infraclass: Placentalia
- Order: Lagomorpha
- Family: Leporidae
- Genus: Oryctolagus
- Species: †O. laynensis

Binomial name
- †Oryctolagus laynensis Lopez-Martinez, 1977

Extinct species of rabbit

Oryctolagus laynensis is an extinct species of rabbit that lived in the Iberian Peninsula during the Early Pleistocene.
