= Thorius magnipes =

Conservation status
- Critically Endangered (IUCN 3.1)

Scientific classification
- Kingdom: Animalia
- Phylum: Chordata
- Class: Amphibia
- Order: Urodela
- Family: Plethodontidae
- Genus: Thorius
- Species: T. magnipes

Binomial name
- Thorius magnipes Hanken & Wake, 1998

Species of salamander

Thorius magnipes is a species of salamander in the family Plethodontidae. It is endemic to the Sierra Madre de Oaxaca of Mexico, and only known from near its type locality near Acultzingo, Veracruz. Its natural habitat is pine-oak forest. It can be found in bromeliads, leaf axils, under rocks and leaf-litter, and inside piles of wood chips. It is threatened by habitat loss caused by logging and agriculture.
