= Cottontail (disambiguation) =

Cottontail may refer to:

== Biology ==
- Cottontail rabbit
  - Dice's cottontail, Sylvilagus dicei
  - Omilteme cottontail, Sylvilagus insonus
  - Desert cottontail, Sylvilagus audubonii
  - Manzano mountain cottontail, Sylvilagus cognatus
  - Mexican cottontail, Sylvilagus cunicularis
  - Eastern cottontail, Sylvilagus floridanus
  - Mountain cottontail, Sylvilagus nuttallii
  - Appalachian cottontail or rarely Allegheny cottontail, Sylvilagus obscurus
  - New England cottontail, Sylvilagus transitionalis

== Other uses ==
- Cottontail (film), a 2022 film
- Cottontail Tower, a landform in Utah, USA
- Peter Cottontail, a character in the works of Thornton W. Burgess
- "Cotton Tail", a 1940 composition by Duke Ellington
- Cotton-tail, a character in Beatrix Potter's Peter Rabbit stories
