= Thorius infernalis =

Conservation status
- Critically Endangered (IUCN 3.1)

Scientific classification
- Kingdom: Animalia
- Phylum: Chordata
- Class: Amphibia
- Order: Urodela
- Family: Plethodontidae
- Genus: Thorius
- Species: T. infernalis

Binomial name
- Thorius infernalis Hanken, Wake & Freeman, 1999

Species of amphibian

Thorius infernalis, commonly known as the Atoyac minute salamander, is a species of salamander in the family Plethodontidae. It is endemic to Mexico where it is only known from its type locality in the Sierra Madre del Sur mountains in central Guerrero. Its natural habitat is riparian vegetation along hillsides, presumably in forest. Much of the potential habitat is already converted into coffee plantations. It is threatened by habitat loss caused by expanding agriculture and human settlements.
