= Thorius arboreus =

Conservation status
- Critically Endangered (IUCN 3.1)

Scientific classification
- Kingdom: Animalia
- Phylum: Chordata
- Class: Amphibia
- Order: Urodela
- Family: Plethodontidae
- Genus: Thorius
- Species: T. arboreus

Binomial name
- Thorius arboreus Hanken & Wake, 1994

Species of salamander

Thorius arboreus, commonly known as the arboreal minute salamander, is a species of salamander in the family Plethodontidae. It is endemic to Sierra Juárez, Oaxaca, Mexico. The specific name arboreus, derives from the Latin word arbor, meaning tree, referring to the arboreal habitat of this species.

== Description ==
With males measuring 16.1–18.4 mm (0.63–0.72 in) and females 15.2–20.0 mm (0.60–0.79 in) in snout–vent length, it is a very small species even among the generally small Thorius. It has a slender habitus. The head is relatively wide; the snout is bluntly pointed. The eyes are relatively large. Maxillary teeth are lacking. The limbs are relatively long. There is a reddish dorsal stripe; some individuals have an ornate pattern where the dorsolateral margins of the stripe are "pinched" over the shoulders.

== Habitat and conservation ==
Its natural habitat is cloud forest. It is an arboreal species typically occurring in the leaf axils of bromeliads. It tolerates some habitat degradation provided that shade remains. The main threats to it are encroachment by agriculture and logging.

== See also ==
- Smallest organisms
