= Thorius lunaris =

Conservation status
- Critically Endangered (IUCN 3.1)

Scientific classification
- Kingdom: Animalia
- Phylum: Chordata
- Class: Amphibia
- Order: Urodela
- Family: Plethodontidae
- Genus: Thorius
- Species: T. lunaris

Binomial name
- Thorius lunaris Hanken & Wake, 1998

Species of salamander

Thorius lunaris, commonly known as the crescent-nostriled thorius, is a species of salamander in the family Plethodontidae. It is endemic to Pico de Orizaba, in Veracruz, Mexico, at elevations of 2,500–2,640 m (8,200–8,660 ft) asl. Its natural habitat is pine-oak forest where it occurs under the bark of stumps and fallen logs, in leaf-litter, and in piles of wood chips. This was formerly very abundant species is now very rare. It is threatened by habitat loss caused by logging and expanding agriculture.
