= Thorius spilogaster =

Conservation status
- Critically Endangered (IUCN 3.1)

Scientific classification
- Kingdom: Animalia
- Phylum: Chordata
- Class: Amphibia
- Order: Urodela
- Family: Plethodontidae
- Genus: Thorius
- Species: T. spilogaster

Binomial name
- Thorius spilogaster Hanken and Wake, 1998

Species of salamander

Thorius spilogaster, commonly known as the spotted thorius, is a species of salamander in the family Plethodontidae. It is endemic to Mexico and only known from the south and southeast flanks of Pico de Orizaba in central Veracruz, at elevations of 2,500–2,725 m (8,202–8,940 ft) asl.

Its natural habitat is pine-oak forest where it is living under the bark of stumps or fallen logs, or, in a partially cut forest, within piles of wood chips and shavings. This species was previously abundant, but has undergone massive declines, with only single specimen recorded over a 15-year period. It is threatened by habitat loss caused by logging, expanding agriculture, and increasing tourist development.
