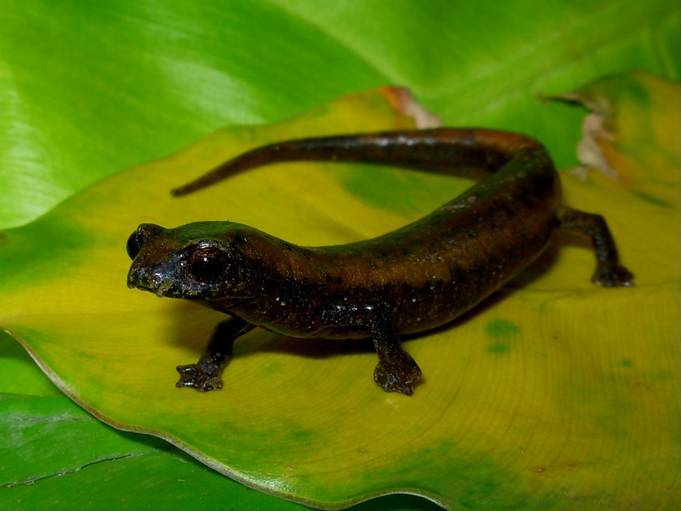

Conservation status
- Endangered (IUCN 3.1)

Scientific classification
- Kingdom: Animalia
- Phylum: Chordata
- Class: Amphibia
- Order: Urodela
- Family: Plethodontidae
- Genus: Bolitoglossa
- Species: B. pandi

Binomial name
- Bolitoglossa pandi Brame and Wake, 1963

= Bolitoglossa pandi =

Species of salamander

Bolitoglossa pandi is a species of salamander in the family Plethodontidae. It is endemic to the Cundinamarca Department of Colombia and only known to be from three locations on the western slopes of the Cordillera Oriental, including its type locality, Pandi; it is named after the type locality where it had been collected 50 years before being described as a new species in 1963.

== Description ==
Bolitoglossa pandi was described based on a single specimen, the holotype, which is an adult female that measured 50.4 mm (1.98 in) in snout–vent length (SVL). Individuals from a population in Supatá measured 15–53 mm (0.59–2.09 in) SVL; females were significantly larger than males. Acosta-Galvis and Gutiérrez-Lamus (2012) give size range 44.7–50.4 mm (1.76–1.98 in) SVL for mature females.

== Habitat, ecology, and conservation ==
The species' natural habitats are moist montane forests at elevations of 1,300–2,200 m (4,300–7,200 ft) above sea level. Salamanders from a population in Supatá were observed foraging on shrubs and perched on leaves at night. During the day, they were found hiding in the leaf litter and in the axils of bromeliads. Adults we perched on taller plants than juveniles. Their diet consisted of arthropods, in particular mites, beetles, and ants.

Bolitoglossa pandi is an uncommon species that is threatened by habitat loss and degradation caused by agriculture (both cultivation of crops and livestock farming). The habitat is severely fragmented. The Supatá population lives in a small protected area.
