= Thorius munificus =

Conservation status
- Critically Endangered (IUCN 3.1)

Scientific classification
- Kingdom: Animalia
- Phylum: Chordata
- Class: Amphibia
- Order: Urodela
- Family: Plethodontidae
- Genus: Thorius
- Species: T. munificus

Binomial name
- Thorius munificus Hanken & Wake, 1998

Species of salamander

Thorius munificus is a species of salamander in the family Plethodontidae. It is endemic to Mexico and only known from near its type locality near Las Vigas, Veracruz. Its natural habitats are pine-oak and pine forests, woodlands, and Arbutus forests with abundant shrubby and ericaceous plants. The species is threatened by habitat loss caused by logging, agriculture, and human settlement.
