= Arden H. Brame =

American herpetologist and genealogist (1934–2004)

Arden Howell Brame, Jr. II
- Born: 19 March 1934; Beverly Hills, California, U.S.
- Died: 19 August 2004 (aged 70); Pico Rivera, California, U.S.
- Education: University of Southern California
- Known for: Research on lungless salamanders
- Scientific career
- Fields: Herpetology, genealogy
- Workplaces: Los Angeles County Museum of Natural History; Eaton Canyon Nature Center

Arden Howell Brame, Jr. II (March 19, 1934 – August 19, 2004) was an American herpetologist and genealogist. His research focused on the family Plethodontidae (lungless salamanders).

== Biography ==
Brame's interest in salamanders began in 1952, when he collected his first living salamanders and corresponded with the German salamander experts Friedrich Pölz and Günther E. Freytag. Brame maintained a large collection of living animals, including a Japanese giant salamander, which he kept in his bathtub.

In the mid-1950s, Brame entered the University of California, Los Angeles, where biologist Bayard H. Brattstrom was his mentor. After transferring to the University of Southern California, he received a Bachelor of Arts degree in botany in 1957. In 1967, he received a Master of Science degree in zoology under the supervision of Jay Mathers Savage.

From 1957 to 1963, Brame was a member of the United States Army Ready Reserve. During six months of active duty at Fort Ord in 1958, he was able to collect salamanders throughout California on weekends. During a maneuver at Fort Ord, he collected specimens of worm salamanders and brought them to the mess hall. He discovered that the moisture-loving salamanders could frequently be observed even during long periods without rain, a phenomenon associated with prolonged summer fogs. From 1961 to 1965, he served as curator of the herpetological collection at the Natural History Museum of Los Angeles County.

In 1965, Brame became director of the Eaton Canyon Nature Center in Altadena, on the northern outskirts of Los Angeles. It was one of the nature centers operated by the Los Angeles County Department of Parks and Recreation. In 1968, he became collections manager at the Natural History Museum of Los Angeles County, but returned to his former position at the Eaton Canyon Nature Center in 1970. The position was eliminated in 1978 as part of a reorganization of the parks administration.

Brame participated in local conservation programs and served as president of the Pasadena Audubon Society from 1971 to 1976. He was also an active supporter of the Society for the Study of Amphibians and Reptiles, serving as its president in 1973.

Between 1956 and 2003, Brame published 40 papers on salamanders, the majority of them concerning lungless salamanders. During the 1950s, he planned to publish a checklist of extant and fossil salamanders in the scientific book series Das Tierreich. The project was never completed. In 1959, he participated in a five-month expedition to Costa Rica funded by the University of Southern California, which led him to study Neotropical salamanders.

Beginning in 1960, Brame published numerous papers on Neotropical salamanders, almost half of them in collaboration with David B. Wake. Numerous new species were described from eight countries ranging from Mexico to Peru. Among them were 26 species in the genus Bolitoglossa and seven in the genus Oedipina. Brame also described four new species of worm salamanders in the genus Batrachoseps from the arid regions of Southern California. These included the desert slender salamander, now regarded as a subspecies of the California slender salamander (Batrachoseps major). The California slender salamander was elevated to species status by Brame in 1968 after having been classified as a subspecies of Batrachoseps pacificus by Richard G. Zweifel in 1958. In total, Brame described 38 species of lungless salamanders.

From 1973 onward, Brame also worked extensively as a genealogist. He discovered that his ancestors included some of the early settlers from the Old World, and in 1989 he published the study Early History of the Brame-Brim Family, 1674–1725, in Middlesex County, Virginia and the Brend-Brim Family, 1544–1666, in the Dart River Valley, Devonshire, England in The English Genealogist. He also had a half-brother who was likewise named Arden Howell Brame, Jr.; consequently, he referred to himself as Arden Howell Brame, Jr. II.

Brame died on August 19, 2004, in a nursing home in Pico Rivera, a suburb of Los Angeles. He died from complications of hepatitis, which he had contracted several years earlier as a result of a blood transfusion.

== Taxa named in his honor ==
David B. Wake, Jay Mathers Savage, and James Hanken named the salamander species Bolitoglossa bramei in honor of Arden Howell Brame in 2007. In 2012, Elizabeth L. Jockusch, Inigo Martinez-Solano, Robert W. Hansen, and David B. Wake described the salamander species Batrachoseps bramei.

== Taxa described (selection) ==
- Batrachoseps relictus Brame & Murray, 1968
- Batrachoseps simatus Brame & Murray, 1968
- Batrachoseps stebbinsi Brame & Murray, 1968
- Bolitoglossa alberchi García-París, Parra-Olea, Brame & Wake, 2002
- Bolitoglossa anthracina Brame, Savage, Wake & Hanken, 2001
- Bolitoglossa capitana Brame & Wake, 1963
- Bolitoglossa chica Brame & Wake, 1963
- Bolitoglossa compacta Wake, Brame & Duellman, 1973
- Bolitoglossa cuna Wake, Brame & Duellman, 1973
- Bolitoglossa digitigrada Wake, Brame & Thomas, 1982
- Bolitoglossa epimela Wake & Brame, 1963
- Bolitoglossa equatoriana Brame & Wake, 1972
- Bolitoglossa hartwegi Wake & Brame, 1969
- Bolitoglossa hypacra (Brame & Wake, 1962)
- Bolitoglossa marmorea (Tanner & Brame, 1961)
- Bolitoglossa medemi Brame & Wake, 1972
- Bolitoglossa minutula Wake, Brame & Duellman, 1973
- Bolitoglossa nicefori Brame & Wake, 1963
- Bolitoglossa orestes Brame & Wake, 1962
- Bolitoglossa pandi Brame & Wake, 1963
- Bolitoglossa phalarosoma Wake & Brame, 1962
- Bolitoglossa ramosi Brame & Wake, 1972
- Bolitoglossa savagei Brame & Wake, 1963
- Bolitoglossa schizodactyla Wake & Brame, 1966
- Bolitoglossa silverstonei Brame & Wake, 1972
- Bolitoglossa stuarti Wake & Brame, 1969
- Bolitoglossa taylori Wake, Brame & Myers, 1970
- Bolitoglossa vallecula Brame & Wake, 1963
- Bolitoglossa walkeri Brame & Wake, 1972
- Oedipina altura Brame, 1968
- Oedipina carablanca Brame, 1968
- Oedipina grandis Brame & Duellman, 1970
- Oedipina paucidentata Brame, 1968
- Oedipina poelzi Brame, 1963
- Oedipina pseudouniformis Brame, 1968
- Oedipina stuarti Brame, 1968
- Plethodon stormi Highton & Brame, 1965
