= Thorius minydemus =

Conservation status
- Endangered (IUCN 3.1)

Scientific classification
- Kingdom: Animalia
- Phylum: Chordata
- Class: Amphibia
- Order: Urodela
- Family: Plethodontidae
- Genus: Thorius
- Species: T. minydemus

Binomial name
- Thorius minydemus Hanken & Wake, 1998

Species of amphibian

Thorius minydemus, commonly known as the La Hoya minute salamander, is a species of salamander in the family Plethodontidae. It is endemic to Mexico and only known from near its type locality near La Joya, Veracruz. Its natural habitats are cloud and pine-oak forests with many bromeliads.

The species is threatened by habitat loss and may already be extinct.
