= Thorius papaloae =

Conservation status
- Critically Endangered (IUCN 3.1)

Scientific classification
- Kingdom: Animalia
- Phylum: Chordata
- Class: Amphibia
- Order: Urodela
- Family: Plethodontidae
- Genus: Thorius
- Species: T. papaloae

Binomial name
- Thorius papaloae Hanken & Wake, 2001

Species of amphibian

Thorius papaloae, commonly known as the Papalo minute salamander, is a species of salamander in the family Plethodontidae. It is endemic to Mexico and only known from one locality near the village of Concepción Pápalo in Sierra Juárez, Oaxaca.

Its natural habitats are pine forests and cloud forests, where it is living under logs and stones, and in leaf-litter. Despite its small range, it is not particularly rare. However, its habitat is under threat from habitat loss caused by logging, human settlement, and cultivation of crops.
