= Thorius boreas =

Conservation status
- Endangered (IUCN 3.1)

Scientific classification
- Kingdom: Animalia
- Phylum: Chordata
- Class: Amphibia
- Order: Urodela
- Family: Plethodontidae
- Genus: Thorius
- Species: T. boreas

Binomial name
- Thorius boreas Hanken & Wake, 1994

Species of salamander

Thorius boreas, commonly known as the boreal thorius, is a species of salamander in the family Plethodontidae. It is endemic to Oaxaca, Mexico, and only known from the Sierra Juárez. Its natural habitats are pine-oak and fir forests, often at forest edges. It is threatened by habitat loss (logging), although it does explain the dramatic decline that this species has seen.
