= Thorius grandis =

Conservation status
- Critically Endangered (IUCN 3.1)

Scientific classification
- Kingdom: Animalia
- Phylum: Chordata
- Class: Amphibia
- Order: Urodela
- Family: Plethodontidae
- Genus: Thorius
- Species: T. grandis

Binomial name
- Thorius grandis Hanken, Wake & Freeman, 1999

Species of amphibian

Thorius grandis, commonly known as the grand minute salamander, is a species of salamander in the family Plethodontidae. It is endemic to Mexico where it is found in west-central Sierra Madre del Sur in Guerrero. Its natural habitats are pine-fir and pine-oak-fir forests; it tolerates some habitat modification. It usually occurs under logs or the bark of fallen rotting logs. It is threatened by habitat loss caused by logging and expanding agriculture.
