= Thorius omiltemi =

Conservation status
- Endangered (IUCN 3.1)

Scientific classification
- Kingdom: Animalia
- Phylum: Chordata
- Class: Amphibia
- Order: Urodela
- Family: Plethodontidae
- Genus: Thorius
- Species: T. omiltemi

Binomial name
- Thorius omiltemi Hanken, Wake & Freeman, 1999

Species of salamander

Thorius omiltemi is a species of salamander in the family Plethodontidae. It is endemic to the area around Omiltemi in the Sierra Madre del Sur of Guerrero, Mexico, at elevations of 2,500–2,950 m (8,200–9,680 ft) asl.

It is a terrestrial salamander that inhabits pine-oak-fir cloud forest and pine-oak forest. It lives under the bark of fallen tree logs. It is threatened by habitat loss caused by agriculture, logging, and human settlement.
