= Thorius insperatus =

Conservation status
- Critically Endangered (IUCN 3.1)

Scientific classification
- Kingdom: Animalia
- Phylum: Chordata
- Class: Amphibia
- Order: Urodela
- Family: Plethodontidae
- Genus: Thorius
- Species: T. insperatus

Binomial name
- Thorius insperatus Hanken & Wake, 1994

Species of salamander

Thorius insperatus is a species of salamander in the family Plethodontidae. It is endemic to Sierra Juárez, Oaxaca, Mexico. The holotype was collected near Vista Hermosa, at 1,500 m (4,900 ft) asl. The specimen was collected under a log in forest. A second specimen was collected in 1998. The species is threatened by habitat loss caused by logging and expanding agriculture.
