= Thorius smithi =

Conservation status
- Critically Endangered (IUCN 3.1)

Scientific classification
- Kingdom: Animalia
- Phylum: Chordata
- Class: Amphibia
- Order: Urodela
- Family: Plethodontidae
- Genus: Thorius
- Species: T. smithi

Binomial name
- Thorius smithi Hanken & Wake, 1994

Species of amphibian

Thorius smithi, commonly known as Smith's salamander, is a species of salamander in the family Plethodontidae. It is endemic to Mexico and only known from near the towns of Vista Hermosa and Metates in Sierra Juárez, Oaxaca. Its natural habitats are cloud and tropical forests where it occurs on the ground under rocks and logs. It is a very rare species known only from two locations, despite attempts to find it. Presumably, habitat loss caused by logging and expanding agricultural development are threats to its forest habitat.
