= Dwarf climbing salamander =

Conservation status
- Endangered (IUCN 3.1)

Scientific classification
- Kingdom: Animalia
- Phylum: Chordata
- Class: Amphibia
- Order: Urodela
- Family: Plethodontidae
- Genus: Bolitoglossa
- Species: B. minutula

Binomial name
- Bolitoglossa minutula Wake, Brame & Duellman, 1973

Species of amphibian

The dwarf climbing salamander (Bolitoglossa minutula) is a species of salamander in the family Plethodontidae. It is found in Costa Rica and Panama. Its natural habitat is subtropical or tropical moist montane forests. It is threatened by habitat loss.
