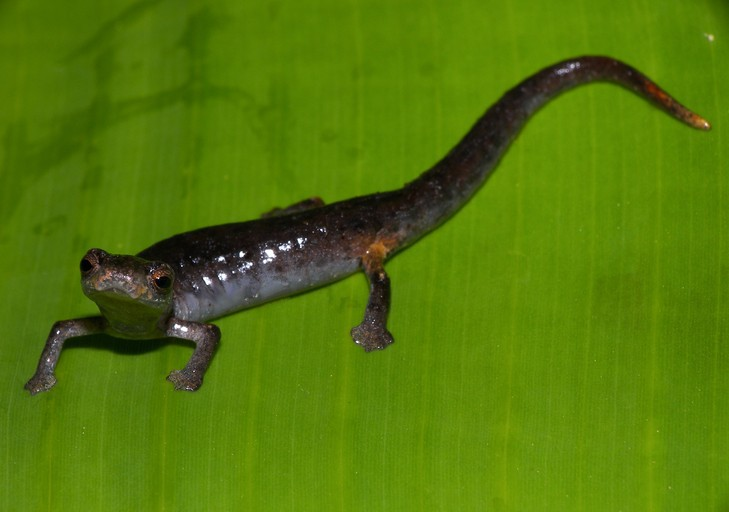

Conservation status
- Near Threatened (IUCN 3.1)

Scientific classification
- Kingdom: Animalia
- Phylum: Chordata
- Class: Amphibia
- Order: Urodela
- Family: Plethodontidae
- Genus: Bolitoglossa
- Species: B. phalarosoma

Binomial name
- Bolitoglossa phalarosoma Wake & Brame, 1962

= Medellin climbing salamander =

Species of amphibian

The Medellin climbing salamander (Bolitoglossa phalarosoma) is a species of salamander in the family Plethodontidae. It is found in Colombia and Panama. Its natural habitat is subtropical or tropical moist montane forests. It is threatened by habitat loss.
