= T. aureus =

T. aureus may refer to:

- Teinopalpus aureus, the golden kaiserihind, a butterfly species found in China and possibly Vietnam
- Thomasomys aureus, the golden Oldfield mouse, a rodent species found in Colombia, Ecuador, Peru and Venezuela
- Thorius aureus, a salamander species endemic to Mexico

== See also ==
- Aureus (disambiguation)
