= Taylor's climbing salamander =

Conservation status
- Endangered (IUCN 3.1)

Scientific classification
- Kingdom: Animalia
- Phylum: Chordata
- Class: Amphibia
- Order: Urodela
- Family: Plethodontidae
- Genus: Bolitoglossa
- Species: B. taylori

Binomial name
- Bolitoglossa taylori (Wake, Brame & Myers, 1970)

Species of amphibian

Taylor's climbing salamander (Bolitoglossa taylori) is a species of salamander in the family Plethodontidae. It is found in Panama and possibly Colombia. Its natural habitats are subtropical or tropical moist lowland forests and subtropical or tropical moist montane forests.
