= Silverstone's salamander =

Conservation status
- Data Deficient (IUCN 3.1)

Scientific classification
- Kingdom: Animalia
- Phylum: Chordata
- Class: Amphibia
- Order: Urodela
- Family: Plethodontidae
- Genus: Bolitoglossa
- Species: B. silverstonei

Binomial name
- Bolitoglossa silverstonei Brame & Wake, 1972

Species of amphibian

Silverstone's salamander (Bolitoglossa silverstonei) is a species of salamander in the family Plethodontidae. It is endemic to Colombia.

Its natural habitat is subtropical or tropical moist lowland forests. It is threatened by habitat loss.
