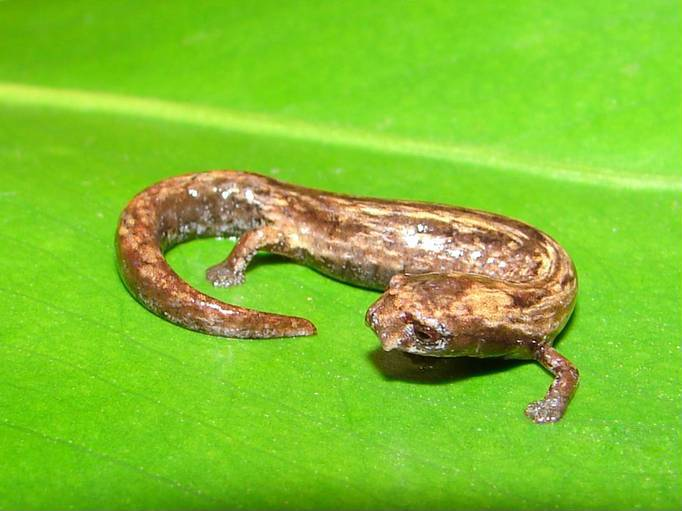

Conservation status
- Near Threatened (IUCN 3.1)

Scientific classification
- Kingdom: Animalia
- Phylum: Chordata
- Class: Amphibia
- Order: Urodela
- Family: Plethodontidae
- Genus: Bolitoglossa
- Species: B. ramosi

Binomial name
- Bolitoglossa ramosi Brame & Wake, 1972

= Bolitoglossa ramosi =

Species of salamander

Bolitoglossa ramosi is a species of salamander in the family Plethodontidae. It is endemic to Colombia.

Its natural habitats are subtropical or tropical moist montane forests, arable land, pastureland, rural gardens, and urban areas.
