= Thorius troglodytes =

Conservation status
- Endangered (IUCN 3.1)

Scientific classification
- Kingdom: Animalia
- Phylum: Chordata
- Class: Amphibia
- Order: Urodela
- Family: Plethodontidae
- Genus: Thorius
- Species: T. troglodytes

Binomial name
- Thorius troglodytes Taylor, 1941

Species of amphibian

Thorius troglodytes, commonly known as Taylor's pigmy salamander, is a species of salamander in the family Plethodontidae that is endemic to Mexico. It is found only near the village of Acultzingo (Veracruz) in the northern Sierra Madre de Oaxaca, at elevations of 2,380–3,000 m (7,810–9,840 ft) asl.

Its natural habitats are pine-oak forests (including somewhat degraded forests) where it lives under bark, logs, in wood chips, and under rocks. This formerly very common species has declined. It is threatened by habitat loss caused by logging, livestock farming, and subsistence agriculture.
