= Sierra Juarez hidden salamander =

Conservation status
- Near Threatened (IUCN 3.1)

Scientific classification
- Kingdom: Animalia
- Phylum: Chordata
- Class: Amphibia
- Order: Urodela
- Family: Plethodontidae
- Genus: Thorius
- Species: T. adelos

Binomial name
- Thorius adelos (Papenfuss and Wake, 1987)

Synonyms
- Nototriton adelos Papenfuss and Wake, 1987; Cryptotriton adelos (Papenfuss and Wake, 1987)

Species of amphibian

The Sierra Juarez hidden salamander (Thorius adelos), also known as the Sierra Juarez moss salamander, or simply Sierra Juarez salamander, is a species of salamander in the family Plethodontidae. It is endemic to the Caribbean slopes of the Sierra de Juarez and Sierra Mazateca, Oaxaca, Mexico.

== Description ==
The holotype of Thorius adelos (an adult male) measures 21.1 mm (0.83 in) in snout–vent length and has a 25.1 mm (0.99 in) long tail. The dorsum and tail are brown. There is a dorsal, cream-coloured stripe on both sides. The snout is blunt with slightly upward-tilted nostrils.

== Habitat and conservation ==
Thorius adelos is a very rare species only found in undisturbed cloud forests at elevations of 1,530–2,050 m (5,020–6,730 ft) above sea level. It is found in bromeliads and other epiphytic plants and in leaf-litter. It is threatened by habitat loss caused by logging, expanding agriculture, and human settlements.
