= Tapanti climbing salamander =

Conservation status
- Data Deficient (IUCN 3.1)

Scientific classification
- Kingdom: Animalia
- Phylum: Chordata
- Class: Amphibia
- Order: Urodela
- Family: Plethodontidae
- Genus: Bolitoglossa
- Species: B. epimela

Binomial name
- Bolitoglossa epimela Wake & Brame, 1963

Species of amphibian

The Tapanti climbing salamander (Bolitoglossa epimela) is a species of salamander in the family Plethodontidae, the salamander is endemic to Costa Rica. Its natural habitats are subtropical or tropical, moist lowland forests and subtropical or tropical, moist montane forests. Currently, the species is under threat due to habitat loss.
