= San Gil climbing salamander =

Conservation status
- Least Concern (IUCN 3.1)

Scientific classification
- Kingdom: Animalia
- Phylum: Chordata
- Class: Amphibia
- Order: Urodela
- Family: Plethodontidae
- Genus: Bolitoglossa
- Species: B. nicefori

Binomial name
- Bolitoglossa nicefori Brame & Wake, 1963

Species of amphibian

The San Gil climbing salamander (Bolitoglossa nicefori), also known as the San Gil mushroomtongue salamander, is a species of salamander belonging to the family Plethodontidae. It is endemic to Colombia, and its natural habitats are tropical highly humid forests; it has also been reported from a coffee plantation. The greatest threat posed to this species is habitat loss, however they are currently nowhere near the risk of extinction. The species' name honors Antoine Rouhaire (Brother Nicéforo María), a French naturalist who collected the species holotype.

== Description ==
B. nicefori have webbed hands and feet with no ventral pads on their digits. They are reddish brown with irregular pale blotches dorsally and brown with irregular cream markings ventrally. They range in size from 29 to 77 mm SVL. Adult females are generally larger than males.

== Habitat ==
The general habitat for B. nicefori consists of various locations throughout the East Andes of Colombia including the municipalities of Piedecuesta (Micro-cuenca La Venta, and Vereda la Amarillas) and Los Santos (Hacienda El Roble) in Santander department. They are found on the western slopes of the Colombian Cordillera Oriental between the elevations of 1400 m and 2400 m. This highly disturbed tropical forest habitat has an average rainfall per year of 1160 mm and an average temperature of 17.36 °C.

This species inhabits both arboreal and terrestrial sites. The majority of them (85%) have been found on herbaceous plants such as coffee plants of large plantations in Colombian municipalities. Preovulatory and pregnant females exclusively inhabit the leaf litter between January and March.

== Diet ==
Their diet consists of a wide range of arthropods. Their most prominent prey are ants, beetles, and larval flies. In rare cases, small traces of vegetation have been found in their stomachs. They either actively hunt or 'sit and wait' to catch their prey. Overall their hunting has only a small effect on even their most prominent food source species.

== Reproduction ==
Males of B. nicefori are capable of sexual activity year round, continually undergoing spermatogenesis. Females on the other hand reproduce seasonally between the dry months of April and June. "Eggs are laid and brooded during the dry season, and hatchlings emerge during the rainy season when moisture is favorable to growth and dispersal." Climate, microhabitat, and availability and abundance of resources can all have an effect on this process. Females produce one clutch (eggs) per year, consisting of anywhere between 20-50 eggs, and matings occur around the same general time of egg-laying.

The population exhibits strong sexual dimorphism in body size between male and female B. nicefori. Males reach a standard length of 29–50 mm at maturation, whereas females are considerably larger reaching a standard length of 39–75 mm. The overall time it takes for these salamanders to completely mature is thought to be approximately 6 years.
