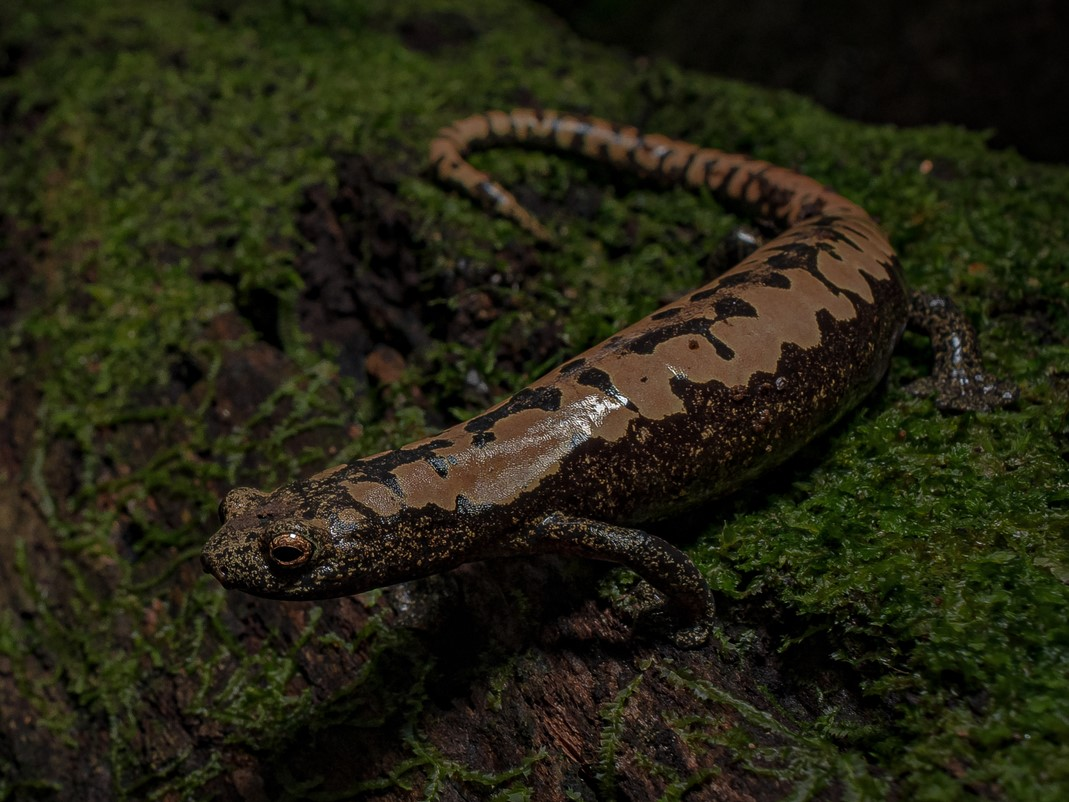

Conservation status
- Vulnerable (IUCN 3.1)

Scientific classification
- Kingdom: Animalia
- Phylum: Chordata
- Class: Amphibia
- Order: Urodela
- Family: Plethodontidae
- Genus: Bolitoglossa
- Species: B. alberchi

Binomial name
- Bolitoglossa alberchi García-París, Parra-Olea, Brame, and Wake, 2002

= Alberch's salamander =

Species of amphibian

Alberch's salamander (Bolitoglossa alberchi), also known as Alberch's mushroomtongue salamander, is a species of salamander in the family Plethodontidae. It is a large and long-tailed salamander for its genus, with females growing to a snout–vent length of 45.1–97.1 mm (1.78–3.82 in) and males reaching a snout–vent length of 59.4–69.6 mm (2.34–2.74 in). They are black with two bands of grayish-green to yellowish chevrons running down the back, frequently joined across the spine to make an irregular, complexly-patterned band punctuated by black patches. It is endemic to Mexico, where it is known from the Los Tuxtlas mountains of Veracruz and the Los Chimalapas mountains from far eastern Oaxaca to western and central Chiapas. It is classified as being vulnerable by the IUCN.

== Taxonomy ==
Bolitoglossa alberchi was formally described in 2002 based on an adult male specimen collected from near Sontecomapan in the Mexican state of Veracruz. The species is named after Pere Alberch, a scientist who worked on Bolitoglossa taxonomy. The species has the English common names Alberch's salamander and Alberch's mushroomtongue salamander.

It is placed within the subgenus Bolitoglossa.

== Description ==
Bolitoglossa alberchi is a large salamander for its genus, with females growing to a snout–vent length of 45.1–97.1 mm (1.78–3.82 in) and males reaching a snout–vent length of 59.4–69.6 mm (2.34–2.74 in). This boldly colored salamander has a black body, with two bands of grayish-green to yellowish chevrons running down the back. These chevrons often join each other across the spine, creating an irregular, complexly-patterned band punctuated by black patches. The snout and limbs are densely flecked with greenish-yellow. The underside is dark brown with whitish-yellow spots. The very long tail is usually black with large greenish-yellow blotches, sometimes giving it a ringed appearance, but only has fine flecks when regenerated.

== Distribution and habitat ==
Bolitoglossa alberchi is endemic to Mexico, where it has a disjunct range in the states of Veracruz, Chiapas, and Oaxaca. In Veracruz, it is known from the Caribbean slope of the Los Tuxtlas mountains. It also occurs in the Los Chimalapas mountains from far eastern Oaxaca to western and central Chiapas. The species largely inhabits relict lowland rainforest, woodland edge, and pastures. It is also known from plantations and banana farms, suggesting a tolerance of disturbed habitat, but is likely still dependent on forested habitat. The species is nocturnal.

== Conservation ==
Bolitoglossa alberchi is classified as being vulnerable by the IUCN. Its habitat is being fragmented and degraded by agricultural and urban expansion within its range. Its population is thought to be declining. Salamander chytrid fungus, a pathogen that has devastated European salamander populations post its 2010 introduction to that continent, has not yet spread to the Americas, but still presents a future threat to the species if it ever spreads to Mexico.
