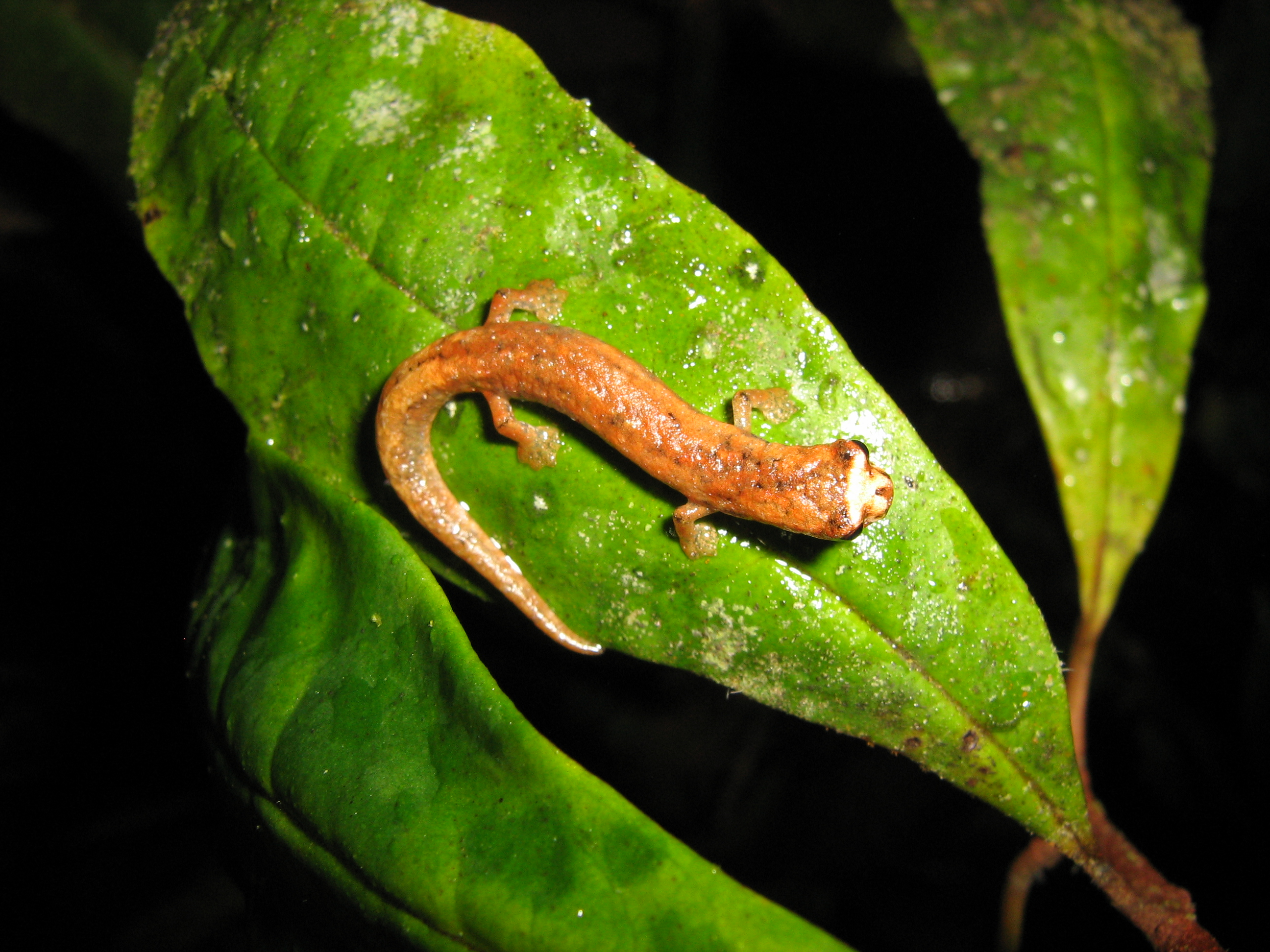

Conservation status
- Near Threatened (IUCN 3.1)

Scientific classification
- Kingdom: Animalia
- Phylum: Chordata
- Class: Amphibia
- Order: Urodela
- Family: Plethodontidae
- Genus: Bolitoglossa
- Species: B. walkeri

Binomial name
- Bolitoglossa walkeri Brame & Wake, 1972

= Walker's salamander =

Species of amphibian

Walker's salamander (Bolitoglossa walkeri) is a species of salamander in the family Plethodontidae. It is endemic to Colombia.

Its natural habitat is subtropical or tropical moist montane forests.
