= Rio Santa Rosa salamander =

Conservation status
- Data Deficient (IUCN 3.1)

Scientific classification
- Kingdom: Animalia
- Phylum: Chordata
- Class: Amphibia
- Order: Urodela
- Family: Plethodontidae
- Genus: Bolitoglossa
- Species: B. digitigrada

Binomial name
- Bolitoglossa digitigrada Wake, Brame & Thomas, 1982

Species of amphibian

The Rio Santa Rosa salamander (Bolitoglossa digitigrada) is a species of salamander in the family Plethodontidae. It is endemic to Peru. Its natural habitats are subtropical or tropical swamps, subtropical or tropical moist montane forests, and plantations .
