= Hotel Zaracay salamander =

Conservation status
- Critically Endangered (IUCN 3.1)

Scientific classification
- Kingdom: Animalia
- Phylum: Chordata
- Class: Amphibia
- Order: Urodela
- Family: Plethodontidae
- Genus: Bolitoglossa
- Species: B. chica

Binomial name
- Bolitoglossa chica Brame & Wake, 1963

Species of amphibian

The Hotel Zaracay salamander (Bolitoglossa chica) is a species of salamander in the family Plethodontidae. It is endemic to Ecuador. Its natural habitat is subtropical or tropical moist lowland forests. It is threatened by habitat loss.
