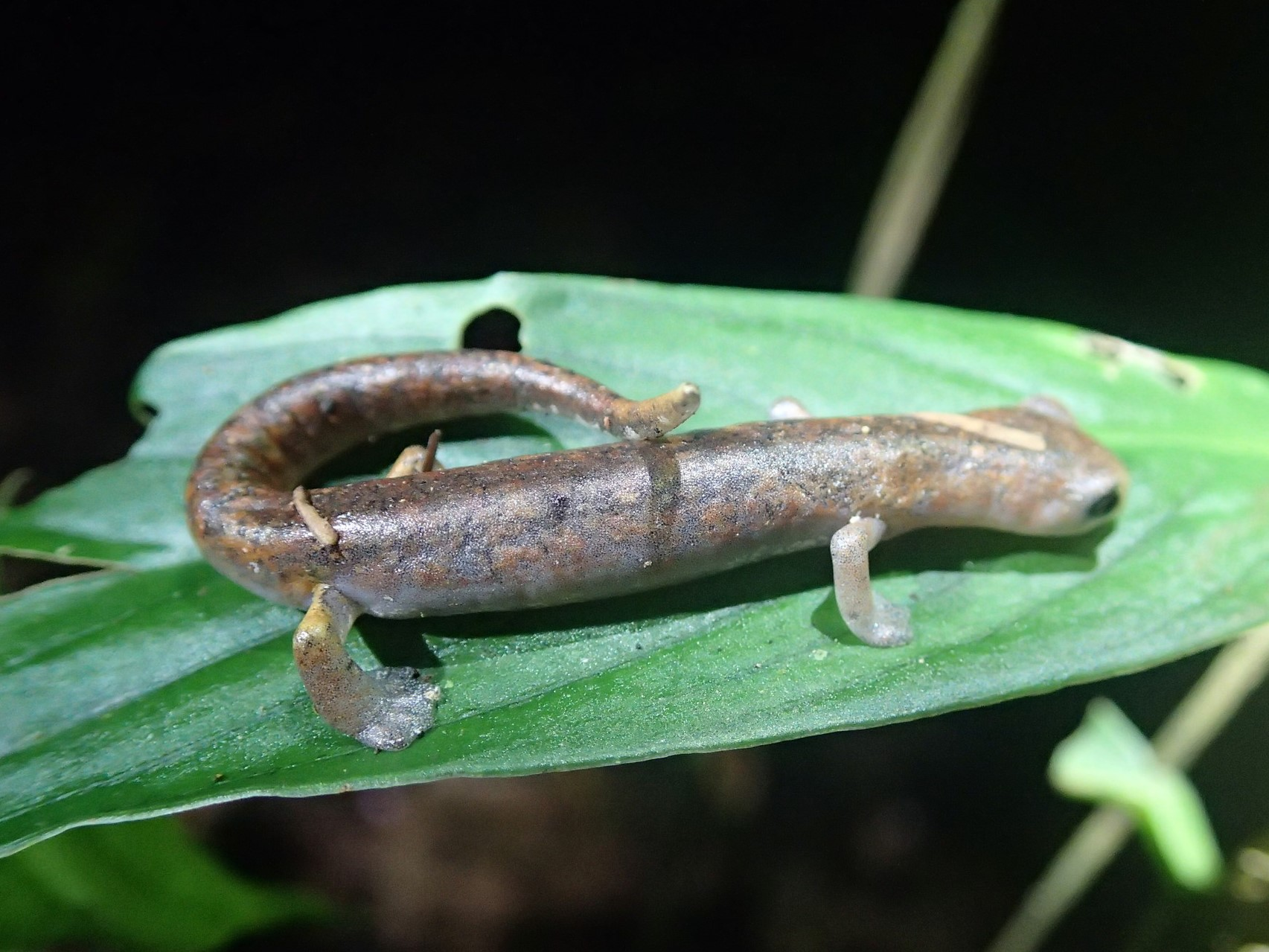

Conservation status
- Least Concern (IUCN 3.1)

Scientific classification
- Kingdom: Animalia
- Phylum: Chordata
- Class: Amphibia
- Order: Urodela
- Family: Plethodontidae
- Genus: Bolitoglossa
- Species: B. equatoriana

Binomial name
- Bolitoglossa equatoriana Brame & Wake, 1972

= Ecuadorian climbing salamander =

Species of amphibian

The Ecuadorian climbing salamander (Bolitoglossa equatoriana) is a species of salamander in the family Plethodontidae. It is found in Colombia and Ecuador. Its natural habitat is subtropical or tropical moist lowland forests. It is threatened by habitat loss.
