= Orphan salamander =

Conservation status
- Critically Endangered (IUCN 3.1)

Scientific classification
- Kingdom: Animalia
- Phylum: Chordata
- Class: Amphibia
- Order: Urodela
- Family: Plethodontidae
- Genus: Bolitoglossa
- Species: B. capitana

Binomial name
- Bolitoglossa capitana (Brame & Wake, 1963)

Species of amphibian

The orphan salamander (Bolitoglossa capitana) is a species of salamander in the family Plethodontidae. It is endemic to Colombia, only known from the type locality, "Hacienda La Victoria", an orphanage 6 kilometres (3.7 mi) north of Albán along the road to Sasaima in the Eastern Ranges at around 1,780 metres (5,840 ft) altitude. Its natural habitat is subtropical or tropical moist montane forests. It is threatened by habitat loss.
