= Paramo Frontino salamander =

Conservation status
- Endangered (IUCN 3.1)

Scientific classification
- Kingdom: Animalia
- Phylum: Chordata
- Class: Amphibia
- Order: Urodela
- Family: Plethodontidae
- Genus: Bolitoglossa
- Species: B. hypacra

Binomial name
- Bolitoglossa hypacra (Brame and Wake, 1962)

Synonyms
- Magnadigita hypacra Brame and Wake, 1962

Species of amphibian

The Paramo Frontino salamander (Bolitoglossa hypacra) is a species of salamander in the family Plethodontidae. It is endemic to the Western Ranges of the Colombian Andes (Cordillera Occidental) where it is known from the area of its type locality, Páramo Frontino. It is also known from the Colibri del Sol Bird Reserve near Urrao. both areas are in the Antioquia Department.

== Description ==
This species was described based on a single adult female, the holotype, measuring 62–63 mm (2.4–2.5 in) in snout–vent length. The tail length is 52 mm (2.0 in). The overall dorsal coloration is dark brown, getting lighter (gray brown) ventrally. There is coarse yellow to yellow-range dorsal speckling, and large, scattered yellow lateral spots, some of them extending onto the venter. The tail is sparsely spotted. The hands and feet are greatly reduced webbing.

== Habitat and conservation ==
Its natural habitat is subtropical or tropical high-altitude grassland at elevations of 3,600–3,700 m (11,800–12,100 ft) above sea level. The assessment by the International Union for Conservation of Nature (IUCN) states that the type locality is within the Paramillo National Natural Park, although this does not agree with the definition of Páramo Frontino elsewhere.
