= Bolitoglossa orestes =

Conservation status
- Endangered (IUCN 3.1)

Scientific classification
- Kingdom: Animalia
- Phylum: Chordata
- Class: Amphibia
- Order: Urodela
- Family: Plethodontidae
- Genus: Bolitoglossa
- Species: B. orestes

Binomial name
- Bolitoglossa orestes Brame and Wake, 1962

Synonyms
- Bolitoglossa spongai Barrio and Fuentes, 1999

Species of amphibian

Bolitoglossa orestes, commonly known as the Culata mushroomtongue salamander, is a species of salamander in the family Plethodontidae. It is endemic to the Mérida state of Venezuela.

== Taxonomy ==
Bolitoglossa spongai (common name: Sponga salamander), described in 1999, is since 2012 considered a synonym of Bolitoglossa orestes.

== Description ==
Adult Bolitoglossa orestes measure 34–46 mm (1.3–1.8 in) in snout–vent length. Males and females are alike. Their skin is smooth and brown-orange to pale brown or yellowish in colour in the dorsum but darker in the flanks. The tail is about as long as the snout–vent length. Breeding is by direct development.

== Habitat and conservation ==
This uncommon species is only found in cloud forests at the elevations of 2,000–3,500 m (6,600–11,500 ft) asl. Some populations might be threatened by habitat loss, but many populations are within protected areas.
