= Thorius aureus =

Conservation status
- Critically Endangered (IUCN 3.1)

Scientific classification
- Kingdom: Animalia
- Phylum: Chordata
- Class: Amphibia
- Order: Urodela
- Family: Plethodontidae
- Genus: Thorius
- Species: T. aureus

Binomial name
- Thorius aureus Hanken & Wake, 1994

Species of salamander

Thorius aureus, the golden thorius, is a species of salamander in the genus Thorius, the Mexican pigmy salamanders, part of the lungless salamander family. It is endemic to mountainous areas of north central Oaxaca State in Mexico. It is one of the largest Thorius species.

== Etymology ==
The specific name aureus, Latin for golden or splendid, refers to the distinctive golden dorsal stripe that is characteristic of the species.

== Description ==
Thorius aureus is a slender salamander with a narrow head and long tail. However, among Thorius it counts as a large and robust species, with males measuring 21.1–29.3 mm (0.83–1.15 in) and females 22.6–34.9 mm (0.89–1.37 in) in snout–vent length. The tail is relatively long and can be up to 1.16 times the snout–vent length in males. It grows to a total length of about 57 millimetres (2.2 in) and is one of the largest species in the genus. Females have a rounded snout but this is more pointed in males. The eyes are protuberant and the nasolabial grooves distinct. The nostrils are small and oval and the upper jaw contains teeth (these are absent in many other members of the genus). The limbs are short with slender hands and feet. The digits are partially fused but are free at the tips. The dorsal surface is light brown and there is a distinctive broad golden stripe running along the spine, widest on the head and back and narrower at the shoulders. There are several brown chevron-shaped markings on the stripe.

== Distribution and habitat ==
Thorius aureus is found in a restricted area around the peak of Cerro Pelón on the northern slopes of the Sierra Juárez, Oaxaca, Mexico, at altitudes of between 2,600 and 3,000 metres (8,500 and 9,800 ft) above sea level. It lives among the leaf litter on the forest floor of mixed woodland of oak, fir and pine and also in cloud forests. Being nocturnal, it hides during the daytime under rocks and fallen timber.

== Biology ==
Little is known of the biology of this species. It is believed to feed on grubs, insects and other small invertebrates found among the leaf litter or under the bark of rotting logs. No eggs have been observed but they are thought to be laid on land and to undergo direct development into juvenile salamanders without passing through a larval stage.

== Status ==
Thorius aureus is listed as being "Critically Endangered" by the International Union for Conservation of Nature in its Red List of Threatened Species. This is because, although at one time common within its range, by 2008 no populations could be located, with only one sighting in the previous few years. Normally a resident of virgin forest, it does not adapt well to living in secondary growth, but the amount of logging within its range is insufficient to account for its dramatic population decline, which remains unexplained.
