= Thorius schmidti =

Conservation status
- Critically Endangered (IUCN 3.1)

Scientific classification
- Kingdom: Animalia
- Phylum: Chordata
- Class: Amphibia
- Order: Urodela
- Family: Plethodontidae
- Genus: Thorius
- Species: T. schmidti

Binomial name
- Thorius schmidti Gehlbach, 1959

Species of amphibian

Thorius schmidti, commonly known as Schmidt's pigmy salamander, is a species of salamander in the family Plethodontidae. It is endemic to Mexico and only known from near the village of Zoquitlán in the Sierra Madre de Oaxaca of southern Puebla, possibly also from Oaxaca. It is named after Karl Patterson Schmidt, American herpetologist.

It is an uncommon leaf-litter species inhabiting dense pine-oak forest at elevations of 2,560–2,760 m (8,400–9,060 ft) asl. It is threatened by habitat loss caused by logging and expanding agriculture and human settlements.
