= Cyrtodactylus ayeyarwadyensis =

Conservation status
- Near Threatened (IUCN 3.1)

Scientific classification
- Kingdom: Animalia
- Phylum: Chordata
- Class: Reptilia
- Order: Squamata
- Suborder: Gekkota
- Family: Gekkonidae
- Genus: Cyrtodactylus
- Species: C. ayeyarwadyensis

Binomial name
- Cyrtodactylus ayeyarwadyensis Bauer, 2003
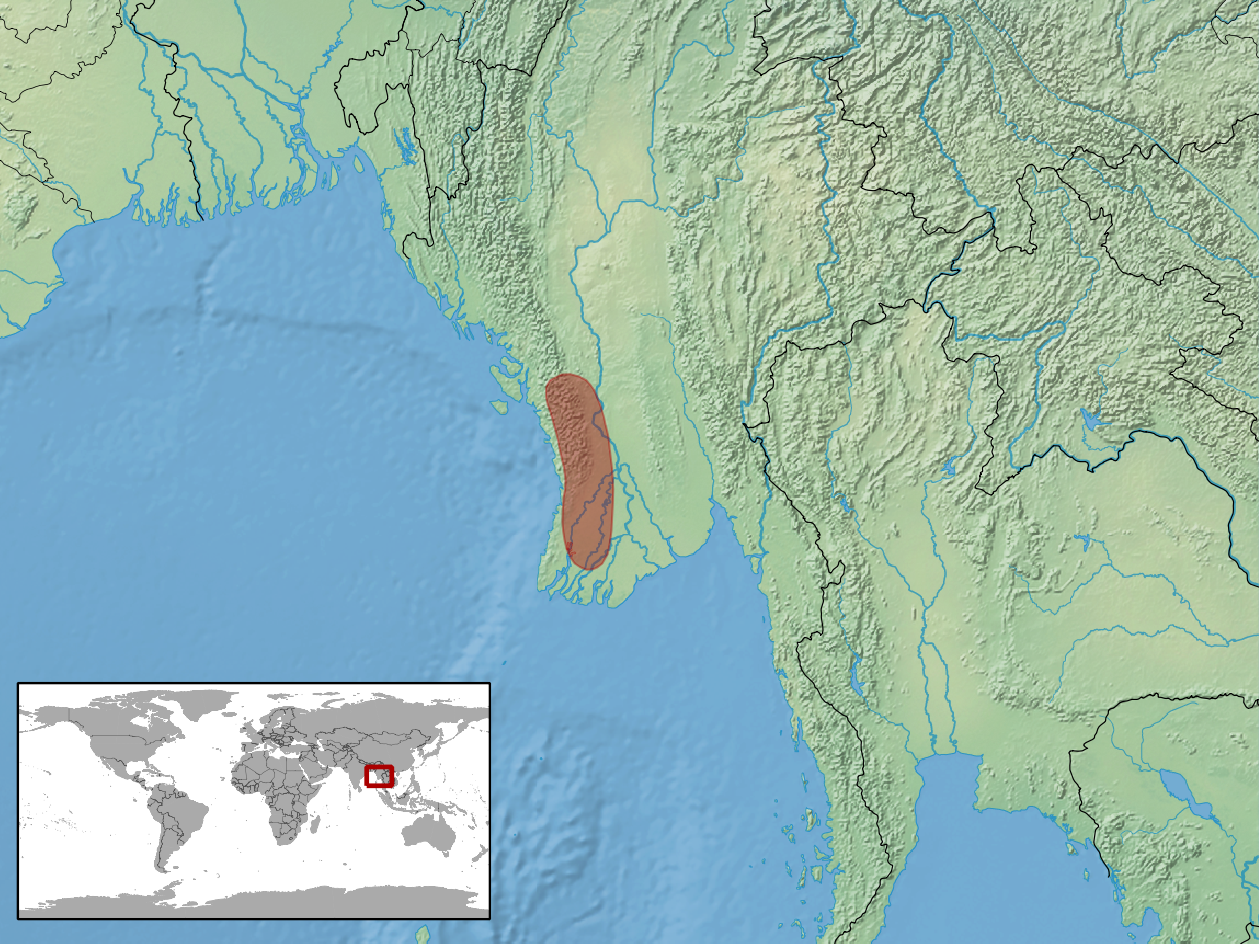

Species of lizard

Cyrtodactylus ayeyarwadyensis is a bent-toed gecko species that was discovered in 2001 in Myanmar's Rakhine Yoma Elephant Range and described in 2003.
