= Omiltemi Ecological State Park =

Protected area in Mexico

- Location within Mexico
- Nearest city: Chilpancingo
- Coordinates: 17°33′N 99°41′W
- Area: 36.13 km^{2} (13.95 sq mi)
- Designation: Ecological State Park

Omiltemi Ecological State Park is a protected area in southern Mexico. It is located in the Sierra Madre del Sur of Guerrero. The park includes well-preserved pine–oak forests and cloud forests.

== Geography ==
Omiltemi Ecological State Park is located in the Sierra Madre del Sur, 15 km west of Chilpancingo.

The topography is rugged, with steep slopes and deep gorges. Elevations range from 1800 to 2800 meters.

== Flora and fauna ==
The park is in the Sierra Madre del Sur pine–oak forests ecoregion. Plant communities include pine forest, pine–oak forest, cloud forest, oak forest, humid oak forest, and areas of dry scrub. The forests of the reserve are some of the best-preserved in Guerrero. 595 species of vascular plants from 102 families have been identified in the park, including 103 species orchids in 41 genera.

167 species of birds have been recorded. 79% of species are permanent residents, 18% are winter residents, 1% are summer residents, and 2% are of uncertain seasonality. 20 species or subspecies are endemic to the Sierra Madre del Sur. Bird species include the long-tailed wood partridge (Dendrortyx macroura), singing quail (Dactylortyx thoracicus), banded quail (Philortyx fasciatus), white-faced quail-dove (Zentrygon albifacies), military macaw (Ara militaris), dusky hummingbird (Phaeoptila sordida), white-tailed hummingbird (Eupherusa poliocerca), pine flycatcher, (Empidonax affinis), white-throated jay or Omiltemi jay (Cyanolyca mirabilis), Boucard's wren (Campylorhynchus jocosus), Aztec thrush (Ridgwayia pinicola), blue mockingbird (Melanotis caerulescens), red-headed tanager (Piranga erythrocephala), rufous-capped brushfinch (Atlapetes pileatus), and white-throated towhee (Melozone albicollis). Endemic and limited-range species include Wagler's toucanet (Aulacorhynchus wagleri), white-throated jay, white-tailed hummingbird, white-striped woodcreeper (Lepidocolaptes leucogaster), Aztec thrush, and subspecies of the long-tailed wood partridge. Omiltemi is designated an Important Bird Area for the presence of the white-tailed hummingbird and white-throated jay.

The Omiltemi cottontail (Sylvilagus insonus) and Omiltemi minute salamander (Thorius omiltemi) are limited to the park and surrounding mountains.
