= Thorius pennatulus =

Conservation status
- Endangered (IUCN 3.1)

Scientific classification
- Kingdom: Animalia
- Phylum: Chordata
- Class: Amphibia
- Order: Urodela
- Family: Plethodontidae
- Genus: Thorius
- Species: T. pennatulus

Binomial name
- Thorius pennatulus Cope, 1869

Species of salamander

Thorius pennatulus is a species of salamander in the family Plethodontidae and one of the smallest tetrapods, with adults reaching a length of about 15 to 21 millimetres (0.59 to 0.83 in). It is endemic to the mountains of Veracruz, Mexico.

== Description ==
Thorius pennatulus is a very small species of salamander reaching a total length of up to 21 millimetres (0.83 in). The head is broad with a pointed snout, small nostrils and protuberant eyes. The tail and limbs are relatively long. The hands and feet are slender with short digits, the longest of which are pointed. The colour is generally pale brown with a regular pattern of darker markings on the back.

== Distribution and habitat ==
Thorius pennatulus has been found at several locations on the Gulf slope of the northern Sierra Madre de Oaxaca, between 1,000 and 1,500 meters elevation. It is a terrestrial species and during the day hides under rocks, in or under rotten logs or among leaf litter in banana plantations. It inhabits cloud forest and lower altitude forest and is also found in damp coffee plantations.

== Biology ==
The young of Thorius pennatulus develop directly in the egg and do not have a larval stage.

== Status ==
Thorius pennatulus is listed as "Endangered" by the IUCN Red List of Threatened Species. At one time it was a very common species in the limited area of forest and plantation where it is found but it underwent a large, unexplained decrease in population so that by the mid-1970s it was uncommon and since then it has continued to decline. There has been an increase in agricultural activities within its range but there is still plenty of good quality habitat remaining so its decline is a mystery. One individual was recorded in 2004 and another in 2006.
