= Rakhine Yoma Elephant Range =

Protected area in Myanmar

- IUCN category IV (habitat/species management area)
- Location within Myanmar
- Location: Thandwe and Gwa Townships, Rakhine State, Myanmar
- Nearest city: Gwa
- Coordinates: 18°00′0″N 94°45′0″E
- Area: 1,755.7 km^{2} (677.9 sq mi)
- Established: 2002
- Governing body: Myanmar Forest Department

Rakhine Yoma Elephant Range is a protected area in Myanmar's Rakhine Yoma mountains, covering about 1,756 km^{2} (678 sq mi) of evergreen and mixed deciduous forest at an elevation of 20–1,270 m (66–4,167 ft). It is located at the southern end of the Arakan Yoma within Thandwe and Gwa townships. The area has over 100 wild elephants.

In 2002, the Rakhine Yoma Elephant Range was established for the protection of the Asian elephant (Elephas maximus). It harbours extensive tracts of bamboo (Melocanna baccifera), which provide shelter for the endangered Arakan forest turtle (Heosemys depressa).

== Biodiversity ==
Wildlife recorded during a camera trap survey in 2000 included large Indian civet (Viverra zibetha), clouded leopard (Neofelis nebulosa), Asiatic golden cat (Catopuma temminckii) and leopard cat (Prionailurus bengalensis).

In 2001, Bufo crocus was discovered by a stream in the sanctuary at an elevation of 83 m (272 ft). In 2001, the bent-toed geckos Cyrtodactylus ayeyarwadyensis and Cyrtodactylus wakeorum were discovered in the sanctuary and described as a new species in 2003.

The presence of western hoolock gibbon (Hoolock hoolock) was confirmed during surveys in 2008. Wildlife present also includes gaur (Bos gaurus), sun bear (Helarctos malayanus), white-rumped vulture (Gyps bengalensis), pale-capped pigeon (Columba punicea), white-winged duck (Asarcornis scutulata) and beautiful nuthatch (Sitta formosa).
