= Thorius pulmonaris =

Conservation status
- Critically Endangered (IUCN 3.1)

Scientific classification
- Kingdom: Animalia
- Phylum: Chordata
- Class: Amphibia
- Order: Urodela
- Family: Plethodontidae
- Genus: Thorius
- Species: T. pulmonaris

Binomial name
- Thorius pulmonaris Taylor, 1939

Species of amphibian

Thorius pulmonaris, commonly known as the lower cerro pigmy salamander or Cerro San Felipe salamander, is a species of salamander in the family Plethodontidae. It is endemic to Oaxaca, Mexico.

It is known only from the region of Cerro San Felipe, on the western slope of the Sierra Madre de Oaxaca in central Oaxaca, above the Valley of Oaxaca, from 2,100 to 2,500 meters elevation. The species' natural habitats are deciduous forests, including those with some pines. It is a terrestrial species usually found beneath leaves and bark. It tolerates some habitat degradation.

T. pulmonaris is a critically endangered species due to its extent of occurrence being less than 5,000 km^{2}. The species is only definitely known to exist in the Cerro San Felipe region, and its population is in decline. Its habitat is threatened by habitat loss due to agriculture, logging, and human settlement. It might exist in the Benito Juárez National Park.
