= Thorius macdougalli =

Conservation status
- Endangered (IUCN 3.1)

Scientific classification
- Kingdom: Animalia
- Phylum: Chordata
- Class: Amphibia
- Order: Urodela
- Family: Plethodontidae
- Genus: Thorius
- Species: T. macdougalli

Binomial name
- Thorius macdougalli Taylor, 1949

Species of amphibian

Thorius macdougalli, commonly known as MacDougall's pigmy salamander, is a species of salamander in the family Plethodontidae. It is endemic to Oaxaca, Mexico, and is known from Cerro de Humo (its type locality) and Sierra de Juárez. Its natural habitat is pine-oak forest, but it also occurs in degraded habitats. It is threatened by habitat loss caused by clear-cutting and livestock grazing.
