= Thorius minutissimus =

Conservation status
- Critically Endangered (IUCN 3.1)

Scientific classification
- Kingdom: Animalia
- Phylum: Chordata
- Class: Amphibia
- Order: Urodela
- Family: Plethodontidae
- Genus: Thorius
- Species: T. minutissimus

Binomial name
- Thorius minutissimus Taylor, 1949

Species of salamander

Thorius minutissimus is a species of salamander in the family Plethodontidae. It is endemic to Mexico. It is known only from one site near Santo Tomás Teipan in the Sierra Madre del Sur of Oaxaca, in pine–oak forest at 2,458 meters elevation. Its extent of occurrence (EOO) is 10 km^{2}, which represents the single location.

It is threatened by habitat loss.
