= Omilteme cottontail =

Conservation status
- Data Deficient (IUCN 3.1)

Scientific classification
- Kingdom: Animalia
- Phylum: Chordata
- Class: Mammalia
- Order: Lagomorpha
- Family: Leporidae
- Genus: Sylvilagus
- Species: S. insonus

Binomial name
- Sylvilagus insonus (E.W. Nelson, 1904)
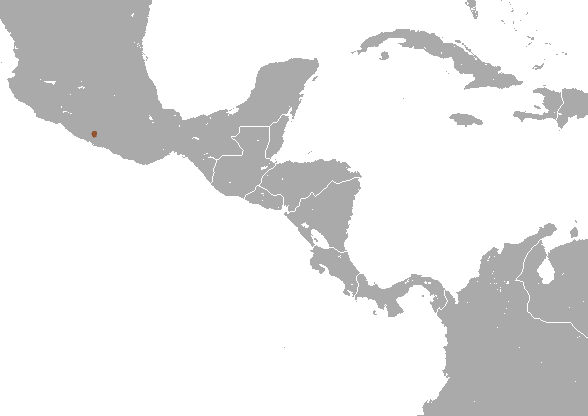
- Omilteme cottontail range

Synonyms
- Lepus insonus E.W. Nelson, 1904

Species of rabbit endemic to Mexico

The Omilteme cottontail (Sylvilagus insonus), or Omiltemi cottontail (Spanish: conejo de Omiltemi), is a species of cottontail rabbit in the family Leporidae found only in the Mexican state of Guerrero in the Sierra Madre del Sur mountain range. It is a nocturnal, large rabbit, rufous to black in fur color, with long ears and a short tail. This cottontail is restricted to cloud forests at elevations of up to 11,499 feet (3,505 meters).

First identified in 1904 by Edward William Nelson in Omilteme, Guerrero, Mexico under the scientific name Lepus insonus, the Omilteme cottontail was soon after reclassified as a member of the genus Sylvilagus, the cottontail rabbits. It is closely related to the Mexican cottontail (S. cunicularius) and the desert cottontail (S. audubonii); the former species overlaps in distribution with the Omilteme cottontail.

The Omilteme cottontail is considered one of the most endangered mammal species in the world, and is only known from a few specimens. Once listed by the International Union for Conservation of Nature and Mexican authorities as critically endangered, it is now considered a data deficient species. From the early 1900s up until the 1990s, no confirmed sightings of the cottontail were recorded, but two individuals were discovered in 1998, and more were found through the 2020s using camera traps. It is threatened by poaching and habitat destruction, and much about its natural history is unknown.

== Taxonomy and systematics ==
The Omilteme cottontail was first described by Edward William Nelson in 1904 as a new species of Lepus, "Lepus insonus". The description was made based on two specimens, which were collected with the assistance of Edward Alphonso Goldman. The type of this species was a female specimen collected from Omilteme, Guerrero, Mexico, stored at the National Museum of Natural History. It was described as "[a] dark, coarse-haired species with small short tail" and noted as "obviously belonging in the same group as [Lepus] gabbi and L. truei", though it had ears that were twice as large as either species. Both L. gabbi and L. truei are now known as subspecies of the Central American tapeti (Sylvilagus gabbi), a cottontail rabbit of wide distribution and unstable taxonomy. In June 1904, the month after Nelson published his description of Lepus insonus, Marcus Ward Lyon Jr. published his work Classification of the Hares and their Allies that clarified the genera of hares and rabbits. Nelson referred to this work in his 1909 publication The Rabbits of North America, where he placed the Omilteme cottontail in the genus Sylvilagus.

There is no fossil evidence of Sylvilagus insonus, and it is only known from its type locality in the province of Guerrero, Mexico. Phylogenetic analysis of the relationships between S. insonus and other species in the genus Sylvilagus yielded evidence that it is closely related to both the Mexican cottontail (S. cunicularius) and the desert cottontail (S. audubonii). The former species is sympatric with S. insonus. Prior studies indicated a relationship with the common tapeti (S. brasiliensis), and it has been variously placed in the subgenera Tapeti and Sylvilagus, but morphological studies find that the common tapeti is more closely related to Dice's cottontail (S. dicei) than it is to S. insonus.

== Characteristics ==
The Omilteme cottontail is a large rabbit (head and body length from 15.7 to 17.3 in (398 to 440 mm)) with long ears (2.4–3.0 in (60–76 mm)), hind feet of medium length (3.5–4.1 in (89–104 mm)) and a short tail (1.6–1.8 in (40–45 mm)). Around the nose and orbital (eye) area, its fur coat is a dull gray. The external, convex surface of the ears is a dark brown-black color; the black is concentrated along the border and tips of the ears. The rabbit's back is rufous (a red-brown color) mixed with black, while the sides are gray-black in color. The medium-sized hind feet are white on the dorsal side and the soles are a dark brown. The dorsal side of the tail is reddish-black while the ventral side is darkly buff or yellowish.

=== Anatomy ===
The anatomy of Sylvilagus insonus has been described with particular focus on the skull. The skull is large, approximately 3.1 in (78 mm) in length and 1.3 in (32 mm) in depth, with a large palate and a wide braincase (back and upper part of the skull; neurocranium). The supraorbital process (projecting bone structure above the eyes, or brow ridge) is flat, attached to the braincase and has two extensions (anterior and posterior). The anterior extension of the supraorbital process is attached to the skull, while the posterior extension is slender and can be free of the brain case or attached with a slit in between the process and the braincase. The supraoccipital shield (bony structure above the occiput) is square shaped. The tympanic bullae (bone structures that enclose the middle and inner ear, synonymous with but measured differently from the auditory bullae) are small and less than 0.48 in (12.3 mm) in length. They have medium-sized auditory bullae with a length of less than 0.38 in (9.6 mm). The width of the basioccipital is narrow: less than 0.35 in (9 mm), but broad across the carotid canals. The width of the infraorbital canals is very narrow, being less than 0.72 in (18.3 mm). The width across the nasal structures is very narrow, and their length is less than 1.26 in (32.1 mm).

The mouth consists of a mandible whose height is less than 1.43 in (36.3 mm), with a mandible ramus depth of less than 0.44 in (11.3 mm). The incisive foramen and the diastema are short. The premaxillaries have extensions on the dorsal side. Large maxillary and mandibular tooth rows are present. Like other leporids, the Omilteme cottontail is heterodont with a total of 28 teeth; it has incisors, premolars and molars, lacks canines, and its dental formula is 2.0.3.31.0.2.3. The length of the first upper incisor is generally less than 0.30 in (7.5 mm).

=== Similar species ===
Sylvilagus insonus differs from other Central American species in its skeletal and external characteristics. Compared to the common tapeti (S. brasiliensis) and Dice's cottontail (S. dicei), it has a larger skull, wider cheekbones, deeper rostrum, wide external openings for the carotid arteries, and dorsal extensions of the premaxillaries. S. insonus also has a narrower basioccipital and narrower post-dental process. The Omilteme cottontail has a longer bicolored tail (rufous and black) instead of a uni-colored tail (solely brown); hind feet with white and brown versus hind feet of only brown; and longer ears. These characteristics are also useful in differentiating the species from the Mexican cottontail (S. cunicularius), with which it shares its habitat. S. insonus is smaller in the length of its upper incisors, its skull length, nasal length, width of the basioccipital, auditory bulla length, the depth of shield bullae, skull depth, width across infraorbital canals, mandible height and mandible ramus depth. The Omilteme cottontail is a rufous-black color dorsally, whereas the Mexican cottontail is only gray in the same areas.

== Geographic range and habitat ==
Sylvilagus insonus is endemic to Mexico and is found only in the Sierra Madre del Sur in the state of Guerrero. It is only known from its type locality, Omiltemi Ecological State Park, located in a wooded summit of a semi-isolated mountain range. It occurs in habitats ranging from 6,998 to 11,499 ft (2,133 to 3,505 m) in elevation. Surrounding the wooded area is the village of Omiltemi at 7,651 ft (2,332 m) above sea level (in Municipio Chilpancingo). The Omilteme cottontail is restricted to a region of less than 193 sq mi (500 km^{2}).

The Omilteme cottontail lives at the summit of a steep-sloped mountain range with many ravines covered with dense cloud forests. Common tree genera in the forests it inhabits are pine (Pinus), oak (Quercus), and alder (Alnus).

== Behavior and ecology ==
Sylvilagus insonus shares its habitat with 37 other mammal species, including one cottontail rabbit, the Mexican cottontail. In the dense cloud forests, the rabbit lives amongst the undergrowth where it makes runways and burrows under rocks and other objects. It is a mainly nocturnal mammal. The only known predator of the species is humans through hunting, though its habitat is frequented by predators such as the wolf, jaguar, and cougar. Very little is known regarding its ecology and reproductive habits.

== Status and conservation ==
The International Union for Conservation of Nature (IUCN), in its Red List of Endangered Species, lists the Omilteme cottontail as "data deficient", though it previously listed the species as critically endangered in 1996 and 2004. A similar evaluation was given by the Mexican government around this time; as of 2019, the same authority describes it as "endangered". The major threats to the survival of this species are poaching and habitat destruction caused by deforestation. This rabbit went unreported in the wild from the early 1900s to the 1990s; however, two specimens were captured in 1998, confirming that the species was still extant. A team of scientists began searching for evidence of the species in 2019, with several specimens received in 2020 from local hunters and additional rabbits discovered from 2020 to 2022 in the Sierra Madre del Sur area within Guerrero, Mexico. In ten regions surveyed by camera traps, seven showed evidence of the species. The expedition was part of a larger effort to rediscover species without documented observations in at least 10 years. Prior to this expedition, the species was only known from five museum specimens and less than 10 total records.

Sylvilagus insonus is considered one of the most endangered mammals in the world, and though it is known to live within a protected area, it is still at risk. Conservation actions have yet to be implemented by local authorities and the National Commission of Natural Protected Areas, as additional studies are needed on the species' natural history to produce useful proposals. Efforts to study the species further have been stymied by the rough terrain of the Sierra Madre del Sur and social issues in the inhabited areas.
