= Thorius dubitus =

Conservation status
- Critically Endangered (IUCN 3.1)

Scientific classification
- Kingdom: Animalia
- Phylum: Chordata
- Class: Amphibia
- Order: Urodela
- Family: Plethodontidae
- Genus: Thorius
- Species: T. dubitus

Binomial name
- Thorius dubitus Taylor, 1941

Species of amphibian

Thorius dubitus, commonly known as the Acultzingo pigmy salamander, is a species of salamander in the family Plethodontidae. It is endemic to Mexico where it is found in the Sierra Madre de Oaxaca of west-central Veracruz and adjacent Puebla.

Thorius dubitus is an exclusively terrestrial species. Its natural habitats are pine-oak cloud forests. It occurs under wood chips, logs, and rocks, and under the bark of logs and inside logs. It is threatened by habitat loss caused by logging, livestock, and subsistence agriculture.
