= Thorius narisovalis =

Conservation status
- Endangered (IUCN 3.1)

Scientific classification
- Kingdom: Animalia
- Phylum: Chordata
- Class: Amphibia
- Order: Urodela
- Family: Plethodontidae
- Genus: Thorius
- Species: T. narisovalis

Binomial name
- Thorius narisovalis Taylor, 1940 "1939"

Species of salamander

Thorius narisovalis is a species of salamander in the family Plethodontidae. It is endemic to Mexico.

The species is known from four disjunct subpopulations in the mountains of northern central Oaxaca – Cerro San Felipe and adjacent upland areas in the Sierra Alaopaneca, the Sierra de Cuatro Venados, and from the vicinity of Tlaxiaco. Its estimated extent of occurrence (EOO) is 2,554 km^{2}. All currently recognized subpopulations have been confirmed as belonging to this species.

Its natural habitats are cloud forests and mixed forests between 2,590 and 3,185 meters elevation. It lives under bark or under fallen trees.

The species is negatively impacted by habitat loss caused by logging, agriculture, and human settlement. It has, however, declined even in suitable habitat.
