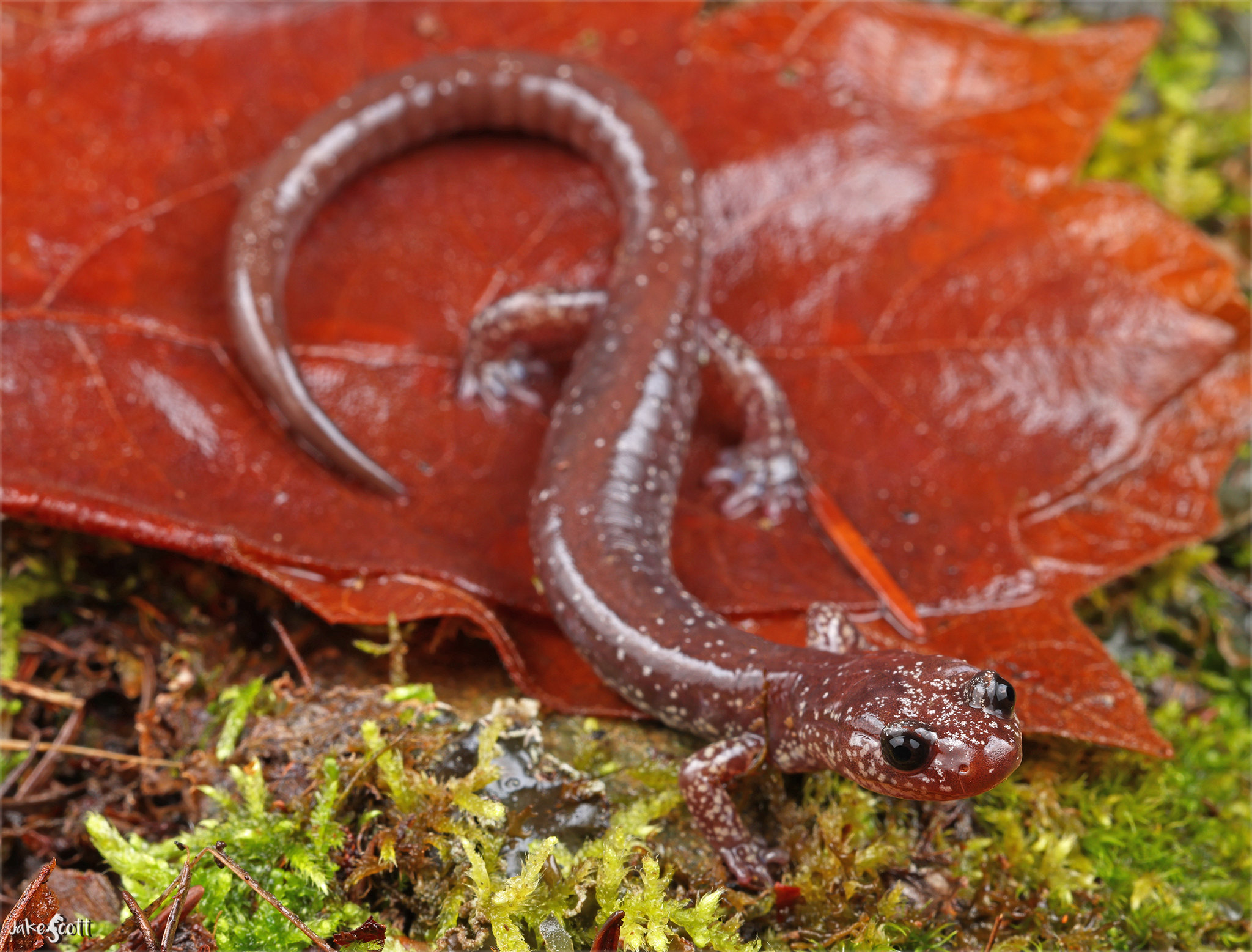

Conservation status
- Endangered (IUCN 3.1)

Scientific classification
- Kingdom: Animalia
- Phylum: Chordata
- Class: Amphibia
- Order: Urodela
- Family: Plethodontidae
- Genus: Plethodon
- Species: P. stormi

Binomial name
- Plethodon stormi Highton & Brame, 1965

= Siskiyou Mountains salamander =

Species of amphibian

The Siskiyou Mountains salamander (Plethodon stormi), also called the Siskiyou Mountain salamander, exists only in isolated locations along the Klamath River in northern California and southern Oregon. It is a close relative of the Del Norte salamander, and some herpetologists believe it may be a subspecies of that animal.

== Etymology ==
The specific name, stormi, is in honor of Canadian-American herpetologist Robert Macleod Storm.

== Description ==
The Siskiyou Mountains salamander is rich brown in color with white speckles. It is about 9 cm (4 in) long, not counting the tail, which is variable in length. Like all of the plethodontids, it lacks lungs and respires through its moist skin. It is nocturnal, prefers cool, moist environments, and is most active during rainfall or high humidity. It stays underground during hot periods and freezes.

== Habitat ==
The preferred natural habitat of P. stormi is rocky areas of forest, at altitudes of 490–1,463 m (1,608–4,800 ft).

== Reproduction ==
The adult female P. stormi lays a clutch of 2–18 eggs every other year.

== Conservation ==
Plethodon stormi is an IUCN Red List endangered species in California. Logging and damming have reduced its habitat.

== Other local amphibians ==
In 2005, researchers discovered through genetic analysis that a larger, darker variant of this salamander is in fact a separate species. It has been named the Scott Bar salamander (Plethodon asupak).

Other prominent amphibians within the range of P. stormi include the rough-skinned newt, Taricha granulosa.

== See also ==
- Siskiyou Mountains

== Sources ==
- Bishop, Sherman C., and Brodie, Edmund D., Jr. (1994). Handbook of Salamanders: The Salamanders of the United States, of Canada, and of Lower California. Ithaca, New York: Cornell University Press. 555 pp. ISBN 0-8014-8213-5.
