= Thorius narismagnus =

Conservation status
- Critically Endangered (IUCN 3.1)

Scientific classification
- Kingdom: Animalia
- Phylum: Chordata
- Class: Amphibia
- Order: Urodela
- Family: Plethodontidae
- Genus: Thorius
- Species: T. narismagnus

Binomial name
- Thorius narismagnus Shannon & Werler, 1955

Synonyms
- Thorius pennatulus narismagnus Shannon and Werler, 1955

Species of amphibian

Thorius narismagnus is a species of salamander in the family Plethodontidae. It is endemic to the San Martin Tuxtla volcano, in the Sierra de los Tuxtlas range in southern Veracruz state, Mexico. Its common name is San Martin pigmy salamander. Natural habitats of Thorius narismagnus are lowland and intermediate tropical forests. It occurs under rotten logs and among leaf-litter, and especially under fallen bromeliads.

This species had not been seen since 1970s, until it was rediscovered in 2012. It has suffered from habitat loss, but this might not suffice to explain the disappearance of this species.
