= Crater salamander =

Conservation status
- Endangered (IUCN 3.1)

Scientific classification
- Kingdom: Animalia
- Phylum: Chordata
- Class: Amphibia
- Order: Urodela
- Family: Plethodontidae
- Genus: Bolitoglossa
- Species: B. marmorea

Binomial name
- Bolitoglossa marmorea (Tanner & Brame, 1961)

Species of amphibian

The crater salamander (Bolitoglossa marmorea), also known as the marbled crater salamander, is a species of salamander in the family Plethodontidae. It is endemic to Costa Rica and Panama. Its natural habitat is subtropical, high-altitude moist montane forests. It has a small area of distribution (less than 5000 km2 and fewer than five locations) and is threatened by habitat loss therein.

== Appearance ==
The crater salamander is a moderately sized salamander. Adults of the species typically range from 128 to 134 millimeters. It is colored purplish-brown with small yellow spots and flecking across its body. The tail of this salamander composes approximately 48–56% of its total length.

== Habitat and ecology ==
The crater salamander is found in humid montane forest and is nocturnal, meaning it sleeps under rocks during the day and is found on mossy trunks and tree limbs at night.

It inhabits the lower montane and montane slopes of southern Cordillera de Talamanca of eastern Costa Rica and western Panama.

== Conservation ==
Although endangered, the species does occur in two protected areas, Parque Nacional Volcán Barú in Panama and La Amistad International Park in Panama and Costa Rica. Although known to be common, it is decreasing and the current population status is unknown due to lack of survey work.
