= Marvalee Wake =

American zoologist and professor

- Born: Marvalee Hendricks; July 31, 1939 (age 87)
- Education: University of Southern California
- Known for: Research in caecilian biology and vertebrate morphology
- Spouse: David B. Wake
- Awards: Guggenheim Fellowship; Henry S. Fitch Award for Excellence in Herpetology
- Scientific career
- Fields: Zoology
- Workplaces: University of California, Berkeley
- Theses: The comparative morphology and evolutionary relationships of the urogenital system of caecilians (1968); The ecogeographic distribution of the lizards of Costa Rica (1964)
- Doctoral advisor: Jay M. Savage
- Website: ib.berkeley.edu/people/faculty/wakem

Marvalee Hendricks Wake (born July 31, 1939) is an American zoologist and professor at the University of California, Berkeley, known for her research in the biology of caecilians (limbless amphibians) and vertebrate development and evolution. A 1988 Guggenheim Fellow, she has served as president of the American Institute of Biological Sciences, the American Society of Ichthyologists and Herpetologists, Society for Integrative and Comparative Biology, International Union of Biological Sciences, and the International Society of Vertebrate Morphology. She is a fellow of the American Association for the Advancement of Science and the California Academy of Sciences, and is a member of the American Academy of Arts and Sciences.

== Life ==
Marvalee Hendricks was born in Orange, California on July 31, 1939. She attended the University of Southern California (USC), earning a B.A. in 1961; M.S. in 1964; and completing her Ph.D. in 1968 under herpetologist Jay Savage. While at USC she met and married biologist David B. Wake and gave birth to a son. Wake became assistant professor at the University of Illinois at Chicago, and later she and her husband moved to the University of California, Berkeley, where David assumed directorship of the Museum of Vertebrate Zoology and Marvalee became a professor. She was rapidly promoted, eventually assuming the chair of the Department of Zoology and its successor, the Department of Integrative Biology. She nominally retired as professor in 2003, but remained active in research and since 2004 has held the position of Professor of the Graduate School at UC Berkeley.

Wake is known as an expert in caecilians—a relatively little-known group of limbless amphibians—and her research has included the developmental biology, evolution, reproduction, and anatomy of these creatures. Her research has been credited with stimulating renewed world-wide interest in the group which has historically received little research. In her doctoral dissertation and a series of early papers she explored comparative aspects of caecilian reproductive anatomy, and in 1972 co-described the first evidence of caecilians in the fossil record. She is also recognized for her contributions towards the field of vertebrate morphology. Biologist Brian K. Hall writes: "Consistently, passionately and effectively, Marvalee Wake has advocated the teaching of morphology as a multifaceted modern science that informs evolutionary biology and evolutionary theory, and is foundational to integrative biology." She has formally collaborated with her husband—an expert in salamanders—since 1975, although the two maintain separate labs and graduate students.

Wake has published or co-published over 200 journal articles and book chapters, edited a revision of the textbook Hyman's Comparative Vertebrate Anatomy (originally written by Libbie H. Hyman), and co-edited a general biology textbook (Biology, 1979) as well as the scholarly book The Origin and Evolution of Larval Forms (1999).

Wake is commemorated in the name of the caecilian Microcaecilia marvaleewakeae, and she and her husband are jointly commemorated in the names of the frog genus Wakea and the lizard Cyrtodactylus wakeorum (Wakes' gecko). A festschrift of papers in her honor was published in the journal Zoology in 2005.

Since 2013, Wake has been listed on the Advisory Council of the National Center for Science Education.

Wake has served as advisor to 17 doctoral students and 15 post-doctoral students. In 2014 she received the Henry S. Fitch Award for Excellence in Herpetology from the American Society of Ichthyologists and Herpetologists.

== Books ==
- Wake, Marvalee H., ed. (1979). Hyman's Comparative Vertebrate Anatomy (3rd ed.). Chicago: University of Chicago Press.
- Jensen, William A.; Heinrich, Bernd; Wake, David B.; Wake, Marvalee H., eds. (1979). Biology. Belmont, California: Wadsworth Publishing Company.
- Hall, Brian K.; Wake, Marvalee H., eds. (1999). The Origin and Evolution of Larval Forms. New York and San Diego: Academic Press.
