= Thorius =

Scientific classification
- Kingdom: Animalia
- Phylum: Chordata
- Class: Amphibia
- Order: Urodela
- Family: Plethodontidae
- Subfamily: Hemidactyliinae
- Genus: Thorius; Cope, 1869

Species
- See table.

Genus of salamanders

Thorius, also known as minute salamanders, pigmy salamanders, or Mexican pigmy salamanders, is a genus of salamanders in the family Plethodontidae. They are endemic to Mexico and found in southern Veracruz and Puebla to Guerrero and Oaxaca.

Thorius is the most species-rich tropical salamander genus relative to its distribution area (Bolitoglossa and Pseudoeurycea have many more species but also much wider distribution areas). It is not uncommon for two or even three species to occur in the same place. In such cases, species have diverged in terms of body size and dentition, apparently facilitating niche differentiation.

The members of this genus are characterized by a small body — some species are less than 2 cm (0.79 in) in snout–vent length (tail roughly doubles the total body length). Their extreme miniaturization is accompanied by determinate growth and skeletal reduction. Their skeleton also shows unique features, such as ossifications of many elements that remain cartilaginous in other salamanders. Consequently, they are easy to distinguish from other salamanders. In contrast, they tend to be similar in appearance, making it difficult to distinguish species. However, molecular genetic methods have greatly facilitated identification of new species.

== Species ==
As of November 15, 2016, this genus is composed of the following 29 species:

Binomial Name and Author	Common name
Thorius adelos (Papenfuss and Wake, 1987)	Sierra Juarez salamander
Thorius arboreus Hanken & Wake, 1994	Arboreal minute salamander
Thorius aureus Hanken & Wake, 1994	Golden minute salamander
Thorius boreas Hanken & Wake, 1994	Northern minute salamander
Thorius dubitus Taylor, 1941	Acultzingo minute salamander
Thorius grandis Hanken, Wake & Freeman, 1999	Grand minute salamander
Thorius hankeni Campbell, Brodie, Flores-Villela, and Smith, 2014	Hanken's minute salamander
Thorius infernalis Hanken, Wake & Freeman, 1999	Atoyac minute salamander
Thorius insperatus Hanken & Wake, 1994	Vista Hermosa minute salamander
Thorius lunaris Hanken & Wake, 1998	Orizaba minute salamander
Thorius macdougalli Taylor, 1949	MacDougall's minute salamanders
Thorius magnipes Hanken & Wake, 1998	Big-footed minute salamander
Thorius maxillabrochus Gehlbach, 1959	Zoquitlan pigmy salamander
Thorius minutissimus Taylor, 1949	Oaxacan minute salamander
Thorius minydemus Hanken & Wake, 1998	La Hoya minute salamander
Thorius munificus Hanken & Wake, 1998	McDiarmid minute salamander
Thorius narismagnus Shannon & Werler, 1955	San Martin minute salamander
Thorius narisovalis Taylor, 1940	Upper Cerro minute salamander
Thorius omiltemi Hanken, Wake & Freeman, 1999	Omiltemi minute salamander
Thorius papaloae Hanken & Wake, 2001	Papalo minute salamander
Thorius pennatulus Cope, 1869	Veracruz minute salamander
Thorius pulmonaris Taylor, 1940	Lower Cerro minute salamander
Thorius schmidti Gehlbach, 1959	Schmidt's minute salamander
Thorius smithi Hanken & Wake, 1994	Smith's minute salamander
Thorius spilogaster Hanken & Wake, 1998	Spotted minute salamander
Thorius troglodytes Taylor, 1941	Taylor's minute salamander
Thorius pinicola Parra-Olea et al., 2016	Pine-dwelling minute salamander
Thorius longicaudus Parra-Olea et al., 2016	Long-tailed minute salamander
Thorius tlaxiacus Parra-Olea et al., 2016	Heroic minute salamander
