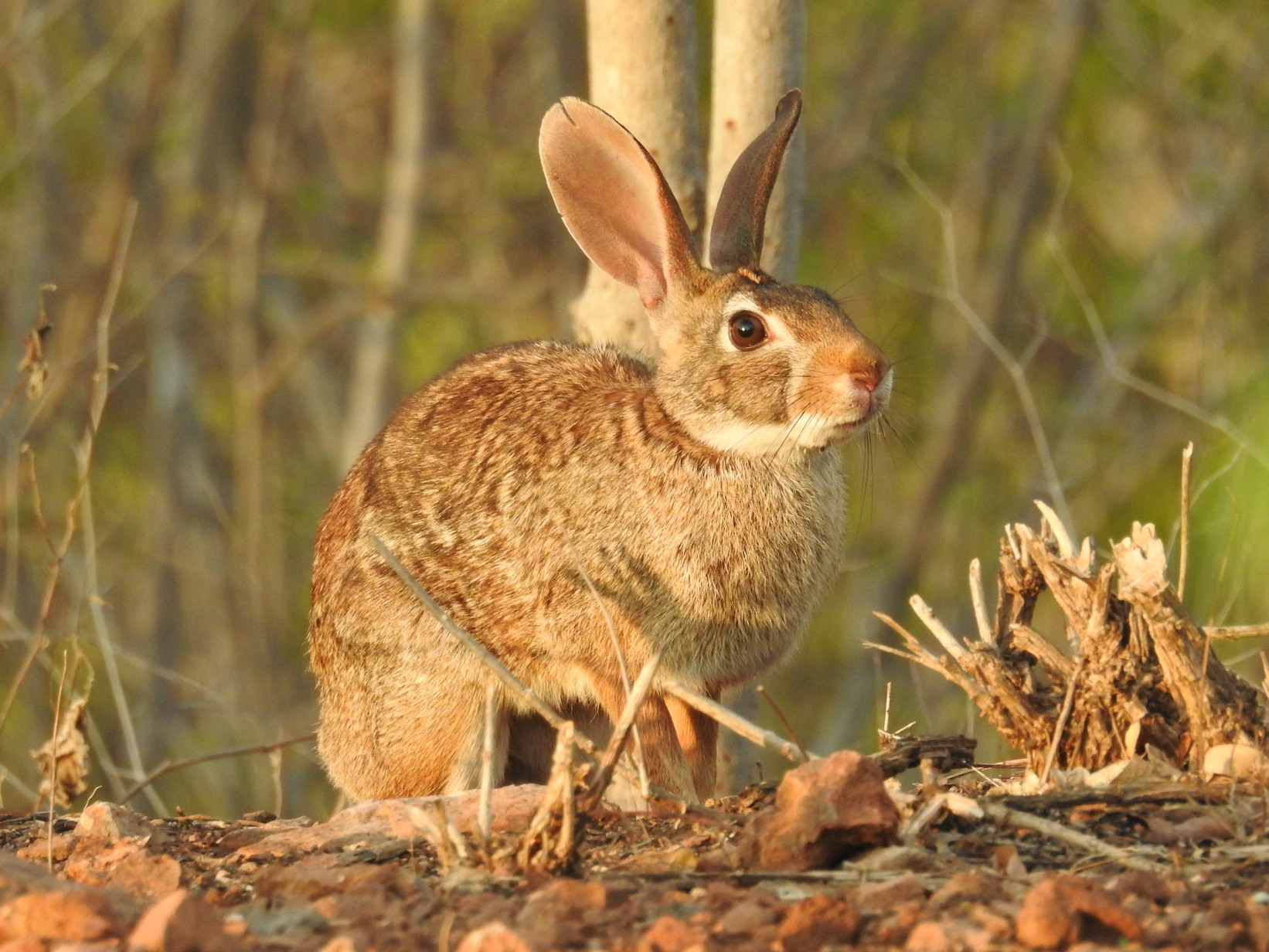
- San Ignacio, Sinaloa, Mexico

Conservation status
- Least Concern (IUCN 3.1)

Scientific classification
- Kingdom: Animalia
- Phylum: Chordata
- Class: Mammalia
- Order: Lagomorpha
- Family: Leporidae
- Genus: Sylvilagus
- Species: S. cunicularius

Binomial name
- Sylvilagus cunicularius (Waterhouse, 1848)
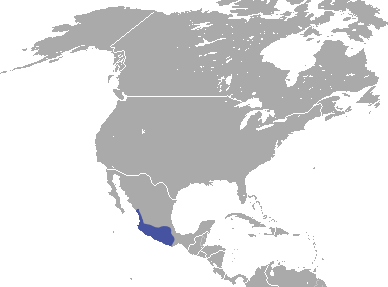
- Mexican cottontail range

Synonyms
- List: Lepus cunicularius H. Lichtenstein, 1830; Lepus cunicularius Waterhouse, 1848; Lepus verae-crucis Thomas, 1890; Lepus insolitus Allen, 1890; Lepus veraecrucis pacificus E. W. Nelson, 1904; Sylvilagus (Sylvilagus) insolitus Lyon, 1904; Sylvilagus (Sylvilagus) veræcrucis Lyon, 1904

= Mexican cottontail =

Mexican cottontail Temporal range: Late Blancan-present 2.7–0 Ma

Species of mammal

The Mexican cottontail (Sylvilagus cunicularius) is a species of cottontail rabbit that is endemic to southern Mexico. Its natural habitats are temperate forests, subtropical or tropical dry forests and pastureland.

== Taxonomy and evolution ==
The Mexican cottontail was first described by the English naturalist George Robert Waterhouse in 1848 as part of his work in classifying specimens in the collection of the museum of the Zoological Society of London. In his account, Waterhouse gave a very brief description compared to those of other species, noted that the specimen was from a population in Mexico (which was given as its type locality), and stated that its scientific name, Lepus cunicularius, was attributed to the German zoologist Hinrich Lichtenstein. Lichtenstein had written in 1830 about the Mexican cottontail very briefly, stating that the species described as Lepus cunicularius was a burrowing rabbit that differed from European rabbits in size, color, and proportions, and could be named the "white-breasted rabbit" (weifsbrüstige Kaninchen). Mammalogist Marcus Ward Lyon Jr. gave the Mexican cottontail its current genus, Sylvilagus, in 1904, though he provided only the names Sylvilagus insolitus and Sylvilagus veraecrucis, the former of which was clarified to be a subspecies of the latter, as written by American naturalist Edward William Nelson in 1909. Nelson also noted that S. veraecrucis was a synonym of S. cunicularius, the name that had priority, which remains in use today. In 1969, mammal curator George Gilbert Goodwin clarified the species' type locality as "Sacualpan", meaning Zacualpan, Mexico. The Mexican cottontail is closely related to the Tres Marias cottontail (S. graysoni), a species that lives only on the Islas Marías in Nayarit. It is also a close relative of the desert cottontail (S. audubonii), with which it forms a clade, and the Omilteme cottontail (S. insonus).

The Mexican cottontail is placed in the subgenus Sylvilagus. Based on analysis of the size and shape characteristics of the species, four subspecies have been identified:

- Sylvilagus cunicularius cunicularius, nominate subspecies
- Sylvilagus cunicularius insolitus
- Sylvilagus cunicularius pacificus, generally smaller than S. c. cunicularius, with longer hind feet and shorter ears, narrower rostrum and braincase, and larger brow ridge; occupies coastal areas in Guerrero state
- Sylvilagus cunicularius leptocephalus

Several fossils of the Mexican cottontail have been found in Mexico and the United States, with the oldest being those found in southern Arizona that date back to the Pliocene. These fossils were recovered from exposed beds to the southeast of Safford, Arizona, and are placed in the late Blancan faunal stage of North America, ranging from 2.7 to 2.4 million years ago.

== Description ==
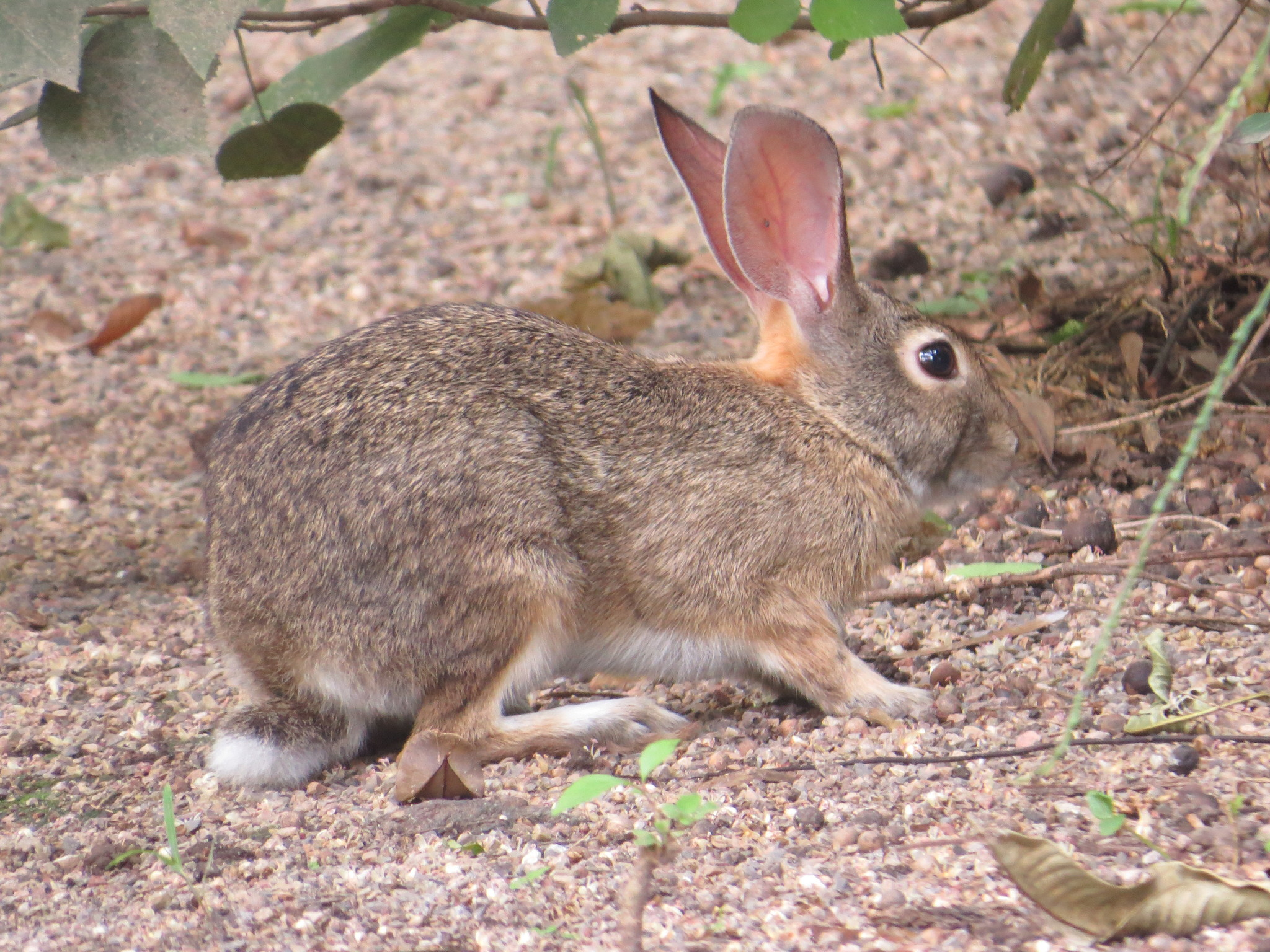
S. cunicularius in Morelos, Mexico

The Mexican cottontail is one of the largest members of the genus Sylvilagus, weighing from 1,800 to 2,300 grams (63 to 81 oz) on average, and is the largest Mexican rabbit. Its size is comparable with that of medium-sized hares. It has coarse reddish-brown or greyish-brown fur and white underparts. In maturity, the fur becomes a paler yellowish-gray. Adults measure at an average body length of 485–515 mm (19.1–20.3 in), tail length of 54–68 mm (2.1–2.7 in), hind foot length of 108–111 mm (4.3–4.4 in), and ear length of 60–63 mm (2.4–2.5 in). Individuals from populations in the Sierra Madre de Oaxaca mountain range tend to be slightly larger than those found elsewhere.

== Behavior and ecology ==
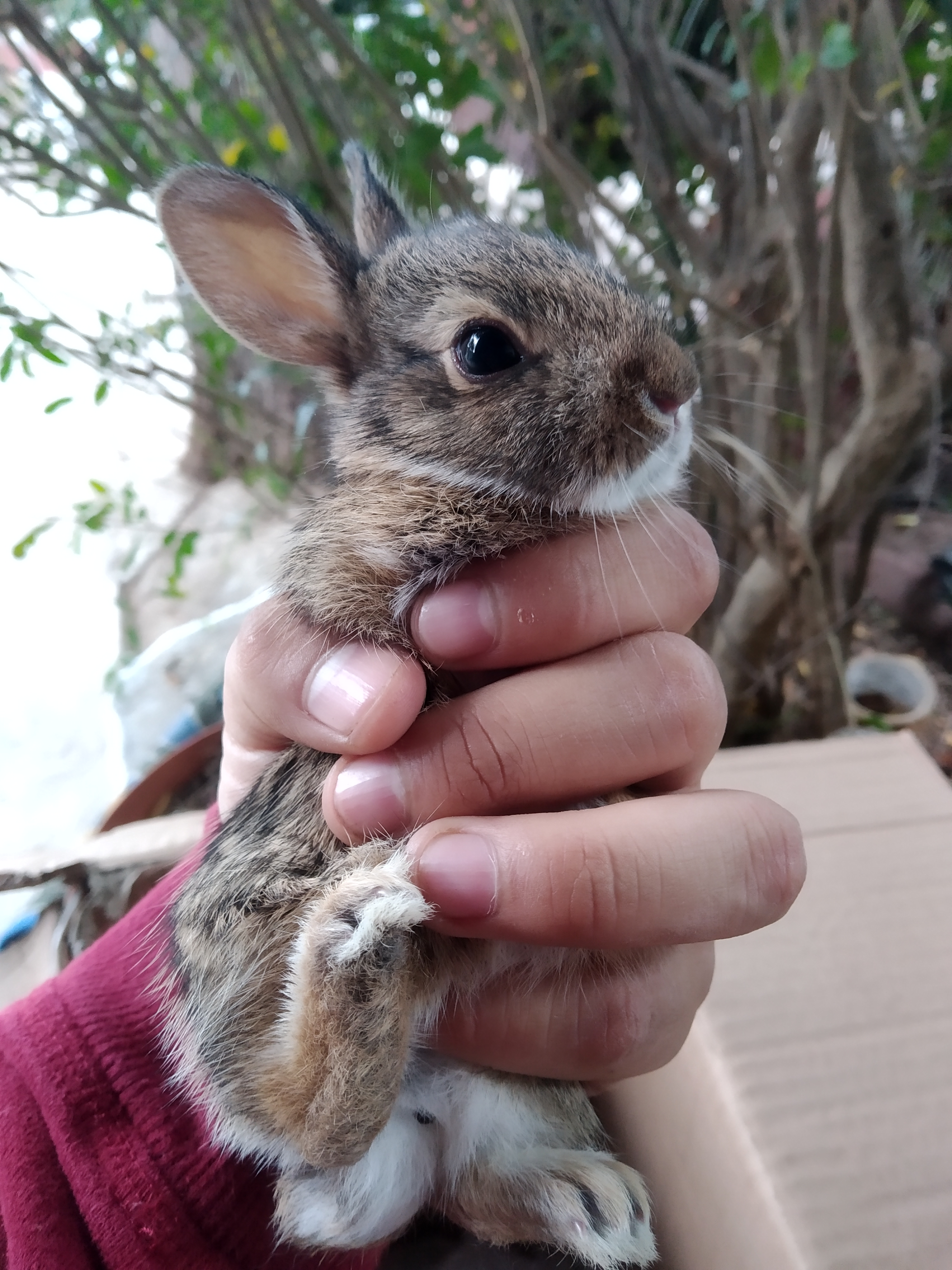
Juvenile Mexican cottontail in hand

The Mexicạn cottontail's breeding season occurs throughout the year, but especially during the warm and wet summer months (March to October). Mothers dig a nursery burrow to contain a nest before they give birth. The burrows are short, shallow tunnels averaging 23 cm (9.1 in) long that end in a chamber about 17 cm (6.7 in) below the surface. Nests are constructed of several materials including dry grasses, pine needles, and bits of woody plants. Oat straw and alfalfa hay are used in the nest as additional food sources. Nursing occurs at the burrow entrance until the young are about 12 days old; after the offspring are weaned, the mother closes the burrow entrance. The burrowing behavior of the Mexican cottontail more closely resembles that of the European rabbit (Oryctolagus cuniculus) and the pygmy rabbit (Brachylagus idahoensis) than other cottontail rabbits.

Predators of the Mexican cottontail include red foxes, coyotes, the long-tailed weasel, feral dogs, the great horned owl, red-tailed hawks, and American crocodiles. Additionally, snakes are known to prey upon the species infrequently.

== Habitat and distribution ==
The Mexican cottontail is found only in Mexico, where its range extends from the state of Sinaloa to the states of Oaxaca and Veracruz, including the mountainous regions of the Trans-Mexican Volcanic Belt. It ranges from sea level up to about 4,300 meters (14,000 feet). It occupies a wide range of habitats including tropical, temperate and dry deciduous forest, dense shrubland, grassland, and cultivated or otherwise disturbed land. In central Mexico, it is common in temperate pine and pine-oak forests with a ground cover of tussocky grasses such as Agrostis, Festuca and Muhlenbergia, while in western Mexico it tends towards drier forest habitats and pastures. Mexican cottontails in southern Sinaloa and western Michoacán can be found from sea level on the coastal plain up to the mountain slopes, where its habitat borders that of the eastern cottontail (S. floridanus). In mountainous areas south of Mexico City, its habitat borders both the eastern cottontail and the volcano rabbit (Romerolagus diazi).

== Threats and conservation ==
The Mexican cottontail is common over its range and is classified by the IUCN in its Red List of Threatened Species as being of least concern. It is present in the La Malinche National Park at densities of about 27 individuals per square kilometer. Its numbers may be dwindling in areas where it is hunted and in others where its habitat is being degraded or overgrazing is taking place.
