= Cyrtodactylus wakeorum =

Conservation status
- Endangered (IUCN 3.1)

Scientific classification
- Kingdom: Animalia
- Phylum: Chordata
- Class: Reptilia
- Order: Squamata
- Suborder: Gekkota
- Family: Gekkonidae
- Genus: Cyrtodactylus
- Species: C. wakeorum

Binomial name
- Cyrtodactylus wakeorum Bauer, 2003
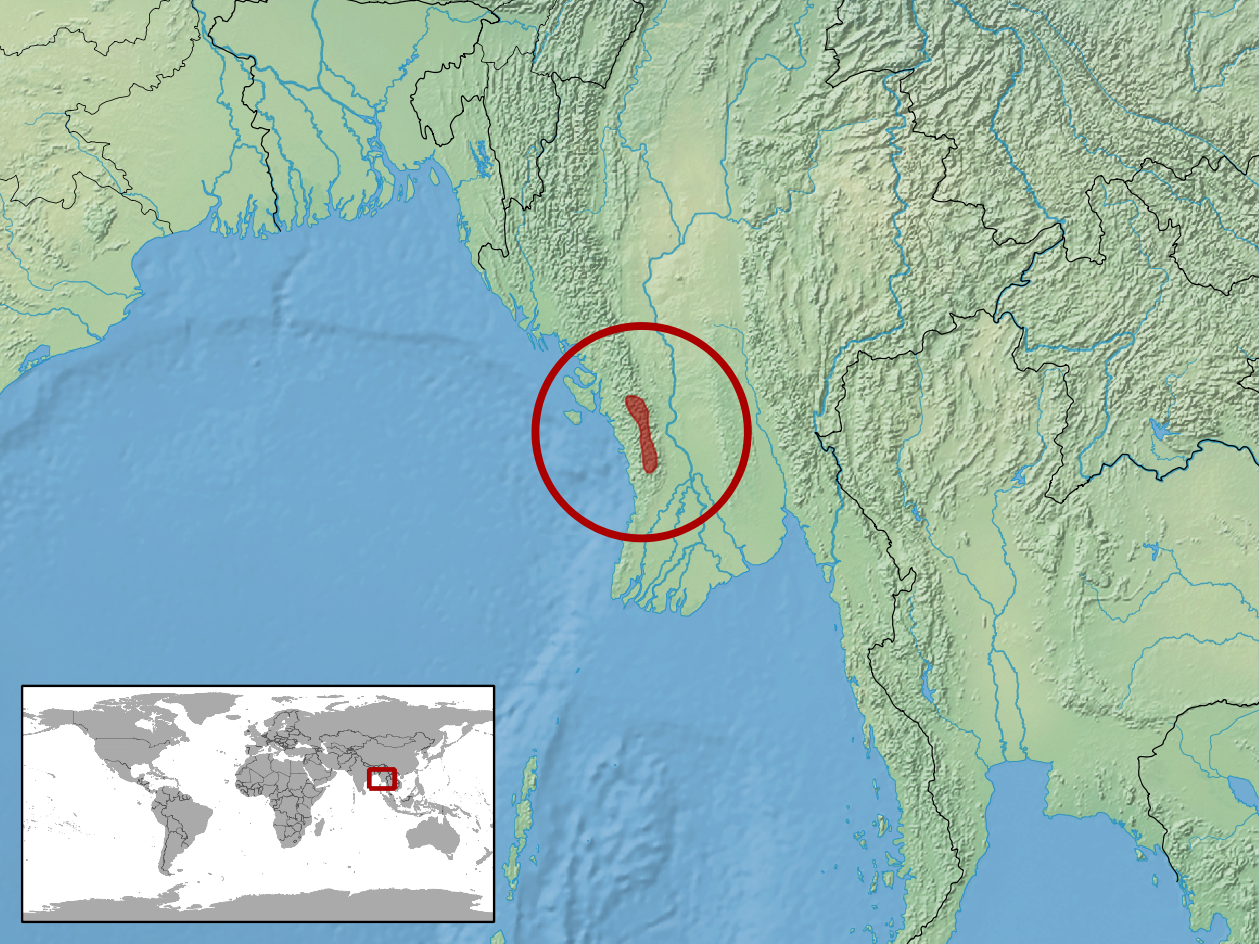

Species of lizard

Cyrtodactylus wakeorum is a species of bent-toed gecko, a lizard in the family Gekkonidae. The species is endemic to Myanmar.

== Etymology ==
The specific name, wakeorum (genitive plural), is in honor of American herpetologists David Burton Wake and Marvalee Hendricks Wake, husband and wife.

== Taxonomy ==
C. wakeorum was discovered in 2001 in Myanmar's Rakhine Yoma Elephant Range and described in 2003.

== Habitat ==
The preferred natural habitat of C. wakeorum is forest.

== Description ==
Small for its genus, C. wakeorum may attain a snout-to-vent length (SVL) of 6.4 cm (2.5 in).

== Reproduction ==
C. wakeorum is oviparous.
