= Pandi, Cundinamarca =

Pandi
- Municipality and town
- Coat of arms

- Location of the municipality and town inside Cundinamarca Department of Colombia

- Location in Colombia
- Coordinates: 4°11′N 74°29′W
- Country: Colombia
- Department: Cundinamarca
- Elevation: 1,024 m (3,360 ft)
- Time zone: UTC-5 (Colombia Standard Time)

Pandi is a municipality and town of Colombia in the department of Cundinamarca.

== Climate ==
Pandi has a tropical savanna climate (Köppen: Aw). The driest period is from June to September.

Climate data for Pandi, elevation 950 m (3,120 ft), (1981–2010)
Month	Jan	Feb	Mar	Apr	May	Jun	Jul	Aug	Sep	Oct	Nov	Dec	Year
Mean daily maximum °C (°F)	28.7 (83.7)	28.9 (84.0)	28.8 (83.8)	28.2 (82.8)	27.9 (82.2)	28.2 (82.8)	28.8 (83.8)	29.5 (85.1)	29.4 (84.9)	28.4 (83.1)	27.7 (81.9)	28.0 (82.4)	28.5 (83.3)
Daily mean °C (°F)	23.9 (75.0)	24.2 (75.6)	24.0 (75.2)	23.6 (74.5)	23.6 (74.5)	23.6 (74.5)	23.8 (74.8)	24.4 (75.9)	24.3 (75.7)	23.7 (74.7)	23.2 (73.8)	23.4 (74.1)	23.8 (74.8)
Mean daily minimum °C (°F)	19.6 (67.3)	19.8 (67.6)	19.9 (67.8)	19.9 (67.8)	19.9 (67.8)	19.8 (67.6)	19.7 (67.5)	20.1 (68.2)	20.1 (68.2)	19.7 (67.5)	19.5 (67.1)	19.4 (66.9)	19.8 (67.6)
Average precipitation mm (inches)	77.2 (3.04)	93.4 (3.68)	130.2 (5.13)	143.4 (5.65)	132.7 (5.22)	57.5 (2.26)	47.4 (1.87)	44.2 (1.74)	80.4 (3.17)	144.8 (5.70)	159.9 (6.30)	107.7 (4.24)	1,218.7 (47.98)
Average precipitation days	11	13	17	20	22	18	17	15	17	20	19	14	199
Average relative humidity (%)	72	70	73	77	79	75	71	66	68	74	78	77	73
Mean monthly sunshine hours	192.2	155.3	142.6	123.0	133.3	138.0	151.9	145.7	129.0	142.6	156.0	182.9	1,792.5
Mean daily sunshine hours	6.2	5.5	4.6	4.1	4.3	4.6	4.9	4.7	4.3	4.6	5.2	5.9	4.9
Source: Instituto de Hidrologia Meteorologia y Estudios Ambientales
