= Acultzingo =

- City and municipality
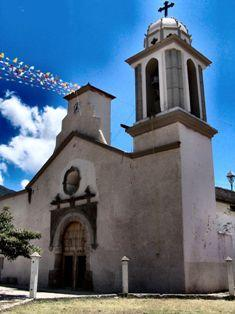
- Church of San Juan Bautista

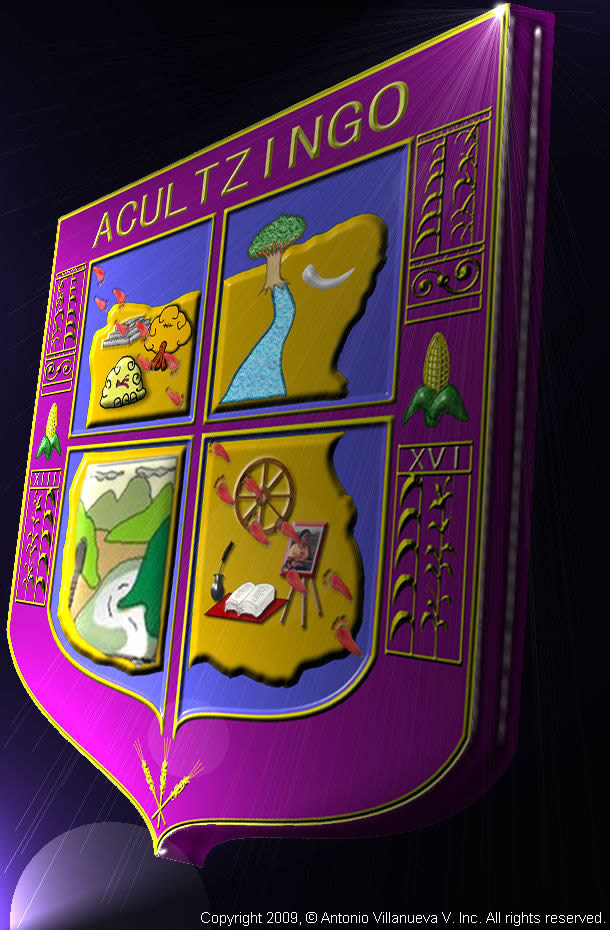
- Coat of arms

- Location within Veracruz Location within Mexico
- Coordinates: 18°43′N 97°19′W
- Country: Mexico
- State: Veracruz
- Municipality: Acultzingo

Government
  - Municipal President: René Medel Carrera (PES)

Area
  - Total: 167.89 km^{2} (64.82 sq mi)

Population (2010) Municipality
  - Total: 20,973
  - Density: 124.92/km^{2} (323.54/sq mi)
- Demonym: Acultzinguense
- Time zone: UTC−06:00 (Central)
- Postal code: 94760
- LADA: 272
- Website: www.acultzingo.gob.mx

Acultzingo is a municipality in the Mexican state of Veracruz. It is located about 220 km from the state capital Xalapa to the south-west.

== Products ==
It produces maize, rice and fabas.

== Geography ==
=== Borders ===
Acultzingo Municipality is delimited to the east by Soledad Atzompan Municipality, to the south and the west by the state of Puebla and to the north by Aquila Municipality.

=== Climate ===
Climate data for Acultzingo
Month	Jan	Feb	Mar	Apr	May	Jun	Jul	Aug	Sep	Oct	Nov	Dec	Year
Mean daily maximum °C (°F)	20.5 (68.9)	21.9 (71.4)	26.0 (78.8)	28.1 (82.6)	27.5 (81.5)	26.0 (78.8)	24.8 (76.6)	25.1 (77.2)	24.7 (76.5)	23.6 (74.5)	22.3 (72.1)	20.3 (68.5)	24.2 (75.6)
Mean daily minimum °C (°F)	6.9 (44.4)	8 (46)	10.4 (50.7)	12.6 (54.7)	13.1 (55.6)	13.4 (56.1)	12.4 (54.3)	12.3 (54.1)	12.9 (55.2)	11.4 (52.5)	9.1 (48.4)	7.9 (46.2)	10.9 (51.6)
Average precipitation mm (inches)	7.6 (0.3)	5.1 (0.2)	10 (0.4)	20 (0.8)	46 (1.8)	110 (4.4)	110 (4.4)	100 (4)	110 (4.2)	30 (1.2)	15 (0.6)	13 (0.5)	580 (22.8)
Source: Weatherbase
