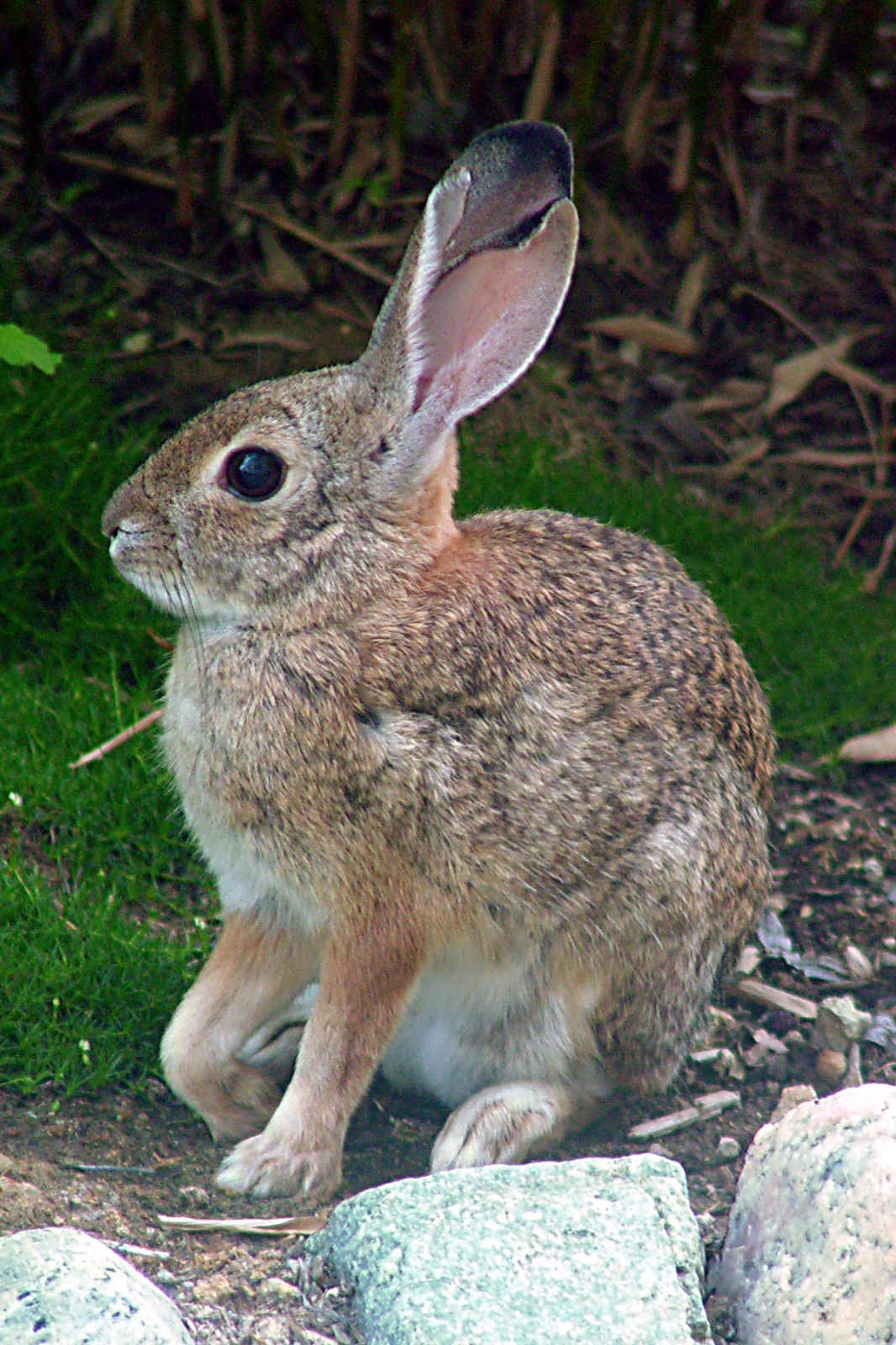

Conservation status
- Least Concern (IUCN 3.1)

Scientific classification
- Kingdom: Animalia
- Phylum: Chordata
- Class: Mammalia
- Order: Lagomorpha
- Family: Leporidae
- Genus: Sylvilagus
- Species: S. audubonii

Binomial name
- Sylvilagus audubonii (Baird, 1858)
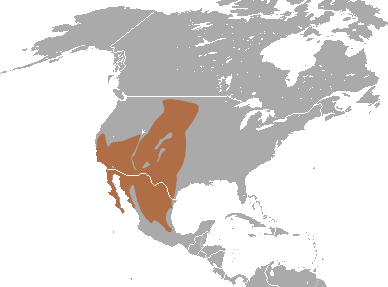
- Desert cottontail range

= Desert cottontail =

Species of mammal

The desert cottontail (Sylvilagus audubonii), also known as Audubon's cottontail, is a New World cottontail rabbit, and a member of the family Leporidae. Unlike the European rabbit (Oryctolagus cuniculus), they do not form social burrow systems, but compared with some other leporids, they are extremely tolerant of other individuals in their vicinity.

Cottontails give birth to their kits in burrows vacated by other mammals. They sometimes cool off, or take refuge in scratched out shallow created depressions of their own making, using their front paws like a back hoe. They are not usually active in the middle of the day but can be observed foraging in the early morning and early evening. Cottontails are rarely found out of their burrows looking for food on windy days, because the wind interferes with their ability to hear approaching predators, their primary defense mechanism.

== Lifespan ==
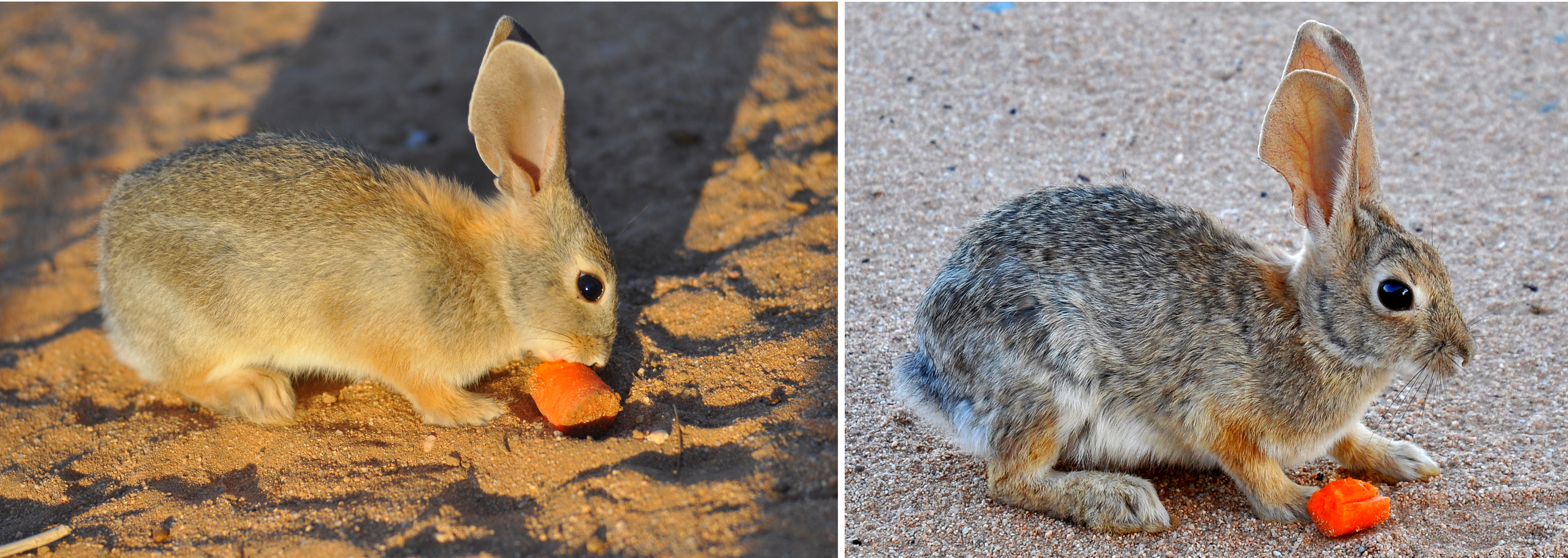
Male desert cottontail at 8 weeks, and the same specimen at 16 months of age

The lifespan of a cottontail that reaches adulthood averages less than two years, depending on the location. Unfortunately for the cottontail, almost every local carnivore larger or faster than the lagomorph is its predator. Some predators, like snakes for example, are familiar with the area inhabited by the cottontails, and can catch and eat the young at will; the mother is unable to defend the litter. Although cottontails are highly active sexually, and mated pairs have multiple litters throughout the year, few young survive to adulthood. Those that survive grow quickly and are full grown at three months.

== Description ==
The desert cottontail is quite similar in appearance to the European rabbit, though its ears are larger and are more often carried erect. It is social among its peers, often gathering in small groups to feed. Like all cottontail rabbits, the desert cottontail has a greyish-brown, rounded tail with a broad white edge and white underside, which is visible as it runs away. It also has white fur on the belly.

Adults are 36 to 42 cm (14 to 17 in) long and weigh anywhere from 700 to 1,200 g (1.5 to 2.6 lb). The tail is 3.0 to 6.0 cm (1.2 to 2.4 in), ears are 6 to 9 cm (2.4 to 3.5 in) long and the hindfeet are large, about 7 to 9 cm (2.8 to 3.5 in) in length. There is little sexual dimorphism, but females tend to be larger than the males, but have much smaller home ranges, about 4,000 m^{2} (1 acre) compared with about 61,000 m^{2} (15 acres) for a male.

== Distribution and habitat ==
The desert cottontail is found throughout the Western United States from eastern Montana to western Texas, and in Northern and Central Mexico. Its eastern range extends barely into the Great Plains. Westward, its range extends to central Nevada, central and southern California and Baja California, touching the Pacific Ocean. It is found at heights of up to 1,830 m (6,000 ft). It is particularly associated with the dry near-desert grasslands of the American southwest, though it is also found in less arid habitats such as pinyon-juniper forest. It is also frequently found in the riparian zones in arid regions.

== Behavior ==
=== Diet and feeding ===
Cottontails are herbivores, with 90% of their diet consisting of grass. They also feed on the leaves and peas of mesquite, barks, fallen fruit, the juicy pads of prickly pear and twigs of shrubs. It rarely needs to drink, getting its water mostly from the plants it eats or from dew. Due to seasonality and changes in moisture conditions of their habitat, cottontails adjust their diets based on many influential factors that impact the seasonal changes of vegetation (i.e. moisture content, abundance, nutrition value, etc.). Like most lagomorphs, it is coprophagic, re-ingesting and chewing its own feces to extract the nutrients as effectively as possible.

The desert cottontail, like all cottontails, eats on all fours. It can only use its nose to move and adjust the position of the food that it places directly in front of its front paws on the ground. The cottontail turns the food with its nose to find the cleanest part of the vegetation (free of sand and inedible parts) to begin its meal. The only time a cottontail uses its front paws to enable eating is when vegetation is above its head on a living plant. The cottontail then lifts a paw to bend the branch and bring the food within reach.

=== Thermoregulation ===
Due to variable temperatures of their habitats, desert cottontails must be adequate thermoregulators to minimize water loss during the hotter seasons and require shaded areas of their environment to conduct evaporative water loss through thermal heat transfer. In open-desert areas, they can withstand for a short period extremely high temperatures of around 45 °C (113 °F), and have a large evaporative water loss capacity of around 1.5% body mass/hour, though cottontails can withstand longer in an ideal environment with shaded areas. To cope with evaporative heat loss, they do panting and undergo changes in production of their basal metabolic rate in relation to the ambient temperature of the environment. Ears of desert cottontails make up 14% of their body size and may help with thermoregulation.

=== Predators and threats ===
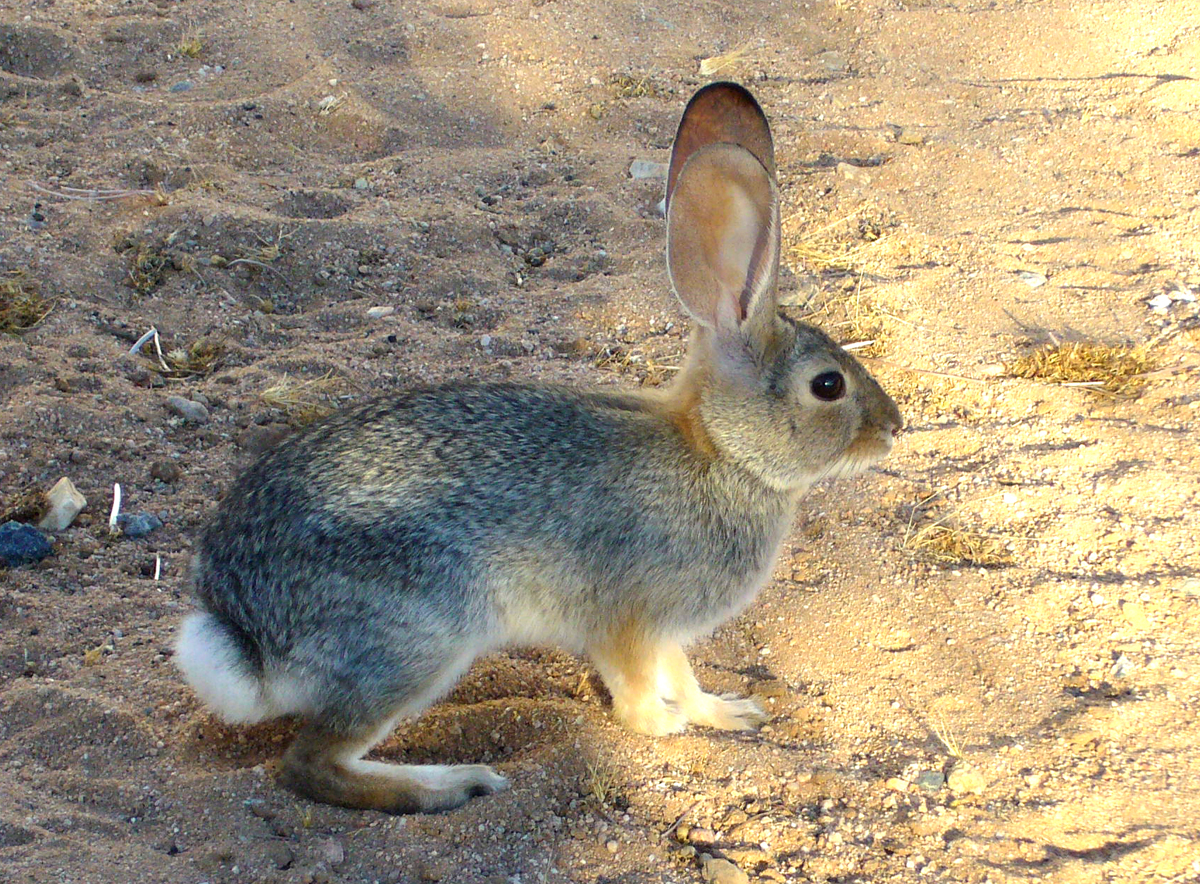
Desert cottontail on alert for predators in the High Desert of California

Many desert animals prey on cottontails, including birds of prey, mustelids, coyotes, bobcats, Mexican wolves, mountain lions, snakes, weasels, humans, and even squirrels, should a cottontail be injured or docile from illness. Alien species, such as cats and dogs, are also known predators, and also pose a threat. Southwestern Native Americans hunted them for meat but also used their fur and hides. It is also considered a game species, due to which it is hunted for sport. The desert cottontail's normal behavior upon spotting a potential predator is to freeze in place in an attempt to avoid being detected. If it determines that it is in danger, it will flee the area by hopping away in a zigzag pattern. Cottontails can reach speeds of over 30 km/h (19 mph). When defending itself against small predators or other desert cottontails, it will nudge with its nose, or slap with its front paws, usually preceded by a hop straight upwards as high as two feet when threatened or taken by surprise.

Habitat loss due to land clearing and cattle grazing may severely affect the population of the desert cottontail. Human-induced fires are also a potential threat for desert cottontail populations. Another factor is its competition with the black-tailed jackrabbit (Lepus californicus), because both have the same diet, and share the same habitat. When a season has been particularly dry, there is less plant life to go around. The cottontail does not fear the jackrabbit, in fact the jackrabbit is very skittish and will retreat from a confrontation in most instances. However, the black-tailed jackrabbit is much bigger, and consumes much more food at eating times.

== Status and conservation ==
Since 1996, the desert cottontail has been rated of least concern on the IUCN Red List; it does not appear on the state or federal list of endangered species. The desert cottontail is considered a game species in the United States by individual state wildlife agencies. It is also not considered to be threatened by the state game agencies in the United States, It is common throughout most of its range in Mexico. None of the twelve subspecies are thought to be under threat and no new conservation measures are needed.
