= James Hanken =

James Hanken is the Alexander Agassiz Professor of Zoology at Harvard University as well as the director of the Museum of Comparative Zoology.

Hanken received his bachelor's degree and Ph.D. from the University of California, Berkeley. He then did post-doctoral research at Dalhousie University before joining the faculty of the University of Colorado at Boulder. He joined the Harvard faculty in 1999.

Hanken has written over 100 scientific papers. He is also a photographer, his photos having been published in Natural History and Audubon among other publications. Hanken is also one of the people involved in the creation of the Encyclopedia of Life.

Among books by Hanken is The Skull: Functional and Evolutionary Mechanisms (University of Chicago Press) written with Brian Keith Hall.

In popular culture, Prof James Hanken has appeared on an episode of a show called Da Ali G Show, where Sacha Baron Cohen interviews James as a fictional character called Ali G.

== Sources ==
- Harvard faculty page
- article on the creation of the Encyclopedia of Life
- speaker bio for Hanken
