= David B. Wake =

American herpetologist (1936–2021)

- Born: June 8, 1936; Webster, South Dakota, U.S.
- Died: April 29, 2021 (aged 84); Oakland, California, U.S.
- Education: University of Southern California; Pacific Lutheran University
- Spouse: Marvalee Wake
- Scientific career
- Fields: Zoology
- Workplaces: Museum of Vertebrate Zoology; University of California, Berkeley; University of Chicago
- Thesis: Comparative osteology and evolution of the lungless salamanders, family Plethodontidae (1964)
- Doctoral advisor: Jay M. Savage
- Notable students: Jonathan Wells
- Website: ib.berkeley.edu/people/faculty/waked

David Burton Wake (June 8, 1936 – April 29, 2021) was an American herpetologist. He was professor of integrative biology and Director and curator of herpetology of the Museum of Vertebrate Zoology at the University of California, Berkeley. Wake is known for his work on the biology and evolution of salamanders as well as general issues of vertebrate evolutionary biology. He has served as president of the Society for the Study of Evolution, the American Society of Naturalists, and American Society of Zoologists. He was a member of the American Association for the Advancement of Science, the Linnean Society of London, the American Academy of Arts and Sciences, the American Philosophical Society, and in 1998 was elected into the National Academy of Sciences. He was awarded the 2006 Leidy Award from the Academy of Natural Sciences of Philadelphia.

== Early life ==
Wake was born in Webster, South Dakota, and grew up in nearby Pierpont. His mother was a high school biology teacher. He cited as a strong influence his maternal grandfather, a Lutheran pastor and amateur naturalist who took David on botanical walks and introduced him to Latin terminology and evolutionary principles. When Wake was in high school his family moved to Washington state where he completed high school and enrolled in Pacific Lutheran College, declaring a history major and considering a career in law. He soon decided to become a biologist instead, graduating in 1958, and chose to pursue graduate school at the University of Southern California under Jay M. Savage. He chose salamanders as a model of how species diversify, earning an M.S. in 1960 and PhD in 1964: writing his doctoral dissertation on the biology of lungless salamanders (family Plethodontidae).

== Academic career ==
Wake was hired by the University of Chicago in 1964, where he worked until 1969, when he was hired as faculty member of UC Berkeley and curator of the Museum of Vertebrate Zoology. He served as director of the MVZ from 1971 to 1998. During his time as a graduate student, Wake met his future wife, Marvalee Hendricks, who was a student in a course he taught. She also became a graduate student in the Savage lab, and they married in 1962. Their son, Thomas, is a zooarchaeologist. Along with Elizabeth Jockusch, he identified several new species of Batrachoseps salamanders in 2001.

== Personal life ==
Wake died on April 29, 2021, at his home in Oakland, California.

== Honors and awards ==
Wake is commemorated in the names of the salamander Cryptotriton wakei (Wake's moss salamander), the skink genus Davewakeum, the frog genus Wakea, a species of the Jurassic salamander Marmorerpeton and the lizard Cyrtodactylus wakeorum (Wakes' gecko)—the latter two named jointly after him and his wife.

The specific epithet of the extinct Qikiqtania wakei was also given in his memory.

David Wake was elected to the American Philosophical Society (1996), the American Academy of Arts and Sciences (1997), and the National Academy of Sciences of the United States (1998). He was a Guggenheim Fellow (1981 – 82) and was recipient of the Distinguished Herpetologist Award from the Herpetologists’ League (1984), the Grinnell Medal from the MVZ (1998), the Henry S. Fitch Award from the American Society of Ichthyologists and Herpetologists (1999), the Joseph Leidy Medal of the Academy of Natural Sciences of Philadelphia (2006) and the Fellows Medal of the California Academy of Sciences (2012). In 1967, he received the Quantrell Award.

== Book publications ==
- Jensen, William A.; Heinrich, Bernd; Wake, David B.; Wake, Marvalee H., eds. (1979). Biology. Belmont, California: Wadsworth Publishing Company. ISBN 9780879011000.
- Wake DB; Roth G, eds. (1989). Complex Organismal Functions: Integration and Evolution in Vertebrates. Chicester: John Wiley & Sons. ISBN 978-0471923756.
