= List of zoology journals =

This is a list of scientific journals which cover the field of zoology.

== A ==
- Acta Entomologica Musei Nationalis Pragae
- Acta Zoologica Academiae Scientiarum Hungaricae
- Acta Zoologica Bulgarica
- Acta Zoológica Mexicana
- Acta Zoologica: Morphology and Evolution
- African Entomology
- African Invertebrates
- African Journal of Herpetology
- African Zoology
- Alces
- American Journal of Primatology
- Animal Biology, formerly Netherlands Journal of Zoology
- Animal Cognition
- Animal Physiology
- Arctic
- Australian Journal of Zoology
- Australian Mammalogy

== B ==
- Bulgarian Journal of Agricultural Science
- Bulletin of the American Museum of Natural History

== C ==
- Canadian Journal of Zoology
- Caribbean Herpetology
- Central European Journal of Biology
- Contributions to Zoology
- Copeia
- Crustaceana

== E ==
- Environmental Biology of Fishes

== F ==
- Frontiers in Zoology

== H ==
- Herpetological Monographs

== I ==
- Integrative and Comparative Biology, formerly American Zoologist
- International Journal of Acarology
- Israel Journal of Entomology
- International Journal of Primatology

== J ==
- Journal of Applied Ichthyology
- Journal of Crustacean Biology
- Journal of Experimental Zoology
- Journal of Fish Biology
- Journal of Herpetology
- Journal of Mammalogy
- Journal of Molluscan Studies
- Journal of Morphology
- Journal of Natural History
- Journal of Zoological Systematics and Evolutionary Research
- Journal of Zoology

== M ==
- Malacologia

== N ==
- North-Western Journal of Zoology

== P ==
- Physiological and Biochemical Zoology

== R ==
- Raffles Bulletin of Zoology
- Rangifer
- Russian Journal of Nematology

== V ==
- The Veliger

== W ==
- Worm Runner's Digest

== Z ==
- Zoo Biology
- ZooKeys
- Zoologica Scripta
- The Zoological Journal
- Zoological Journal of the Linnean Society
- Zoological Science
- Zoologicheskii Zhurnal, Russian Academy of Sciences
- Zoologische Mededelingen
- Zoologischer Anzeiger
- Zoology
- Zoomorphology
- Zootaxa

== See also ==
- List of biology journals
- List of ornithology journals
- List of entomology journals
