= Zoology journal =

Zoology journal may refer to one of the following:

== A ==
- Animal Biology, formerly Netherlands Journal of Zoology
- Australian Journal of Zoology

== C ==
- Canadian Journal of Zoology
- Contributions to Zoology (Bijdragen tot de Dierkunde)

== I ==
- Integrative and Comparative Biology, formerly American Zoologist

== J ==
- Journal of Experimental Zoology
- Journal of Zoology
- Journal of Zoological Systematics and Evolutionary Research

== N ==
- New Zealand Journal of Zoology
- North-Western Journal of Zoology

== Z ==
- The Zoological Journal
- Zoological Journal of the Linnean Society
- Zoology (journal)

== See also ==
- List of zoology journals
