= Zoological society =

A zoological society is a group or organization, often a voluntary association, interested in fields of study related to the animal kingdom. These fields generally include zoology, animal physiology, pathology, veterinary medicine, wildlife conservation, conservation biology, and related topics. Zoological societies are often associated with the operation and/or management of zoos, public aquariums, veterinary hospitals, research institutions, and conservation projects, and with the publication of scientific journals and periodicals. The first such society was the Zoological Society of London, founded in 1826.

Zoological society may refer to:

== Africa ==
- Zoological Society of Southern Africa, publishing African Zoology

== Asia ==
- International Society of Zoological Sciences (founded 2004), based in Beijing, China
- Zoological Society of Bangladesh (founded 1972)
- Zoological Society of Pakistan (founded 1968)
- Malaysian Zoological Society, operating the National Zoo of Malaysia
- Zoological Society of Israel, associated with Heinz Steinitz
- Zoological Society of Nepal

=== India ===
- Zoological Society of India (founded 1938), based in Gaya, India; publishing Proceedings of the Zoological Society of India
- Zoological Society, Kolkata (founded 1945 as the Zoological Society of Bengal), publishing Proceedings of the Zoological Society
- Zoological Society, Madras Christian College, Chennai
- Zoological Society of Odisha State

=== Japan ===
- Fukuoka City Zoological Society (founded 1952), affiliated with the Fukuoka Municipal Zoo and Botanical Garden
- Tokyo Zoological Park Society (founded 1948), operating the Ueno Zoo, Tama Zoological Park, Tokyo Sea Life Park, Inokashira Park Zoo, and Ohshima Park Zoo
- Zoological Society of Japan (founded 1878 as the Biological Society of Tokyo), publishing Zoological Science

== Atlantic islands ==
- Puerto Rico Zoological Society
- Bermuda Zoological Society (founded 1978), affiliated with the Bermuda Aquarium, Museum and Zoo
- Zoological Society of Trinidad and Tobago, affiliated with the Emperor Valley Zoo

== Europe ==
- Société zoologique de France (English: "Zoological Society of France", founded 1876)
- Unione Zoologica Italiana (English: "Zoological Society of Italy"; founded 1900), publishing The European Journal of Zoology
- Zoological Society of Ireland (founded 1830), operating the Dublin Zoo and Fota Wildlife Park
- Koninklijke Maatschappij voor Dierkunde Antwerpen (English: "Royal Zoological Society of Antwerp"), operating the Antwerp Zoo and Planckendael Zoo
- Société impériale zoologique d'acclimatation (English: "Imperial Zoological Society of Acclimatization", founded 1854), affiliated with the Jardin d'Acclimatation
- Zoologisch-Botanische Gesellschaft (English: "Zoological-Botanical Society") of Vienna (founded 1851 by Georg Ritter von Frauenfeld)
- Koninklijke Belgische Vereniging voor Dierkunde vzw - Société Royale Zoologique de Belgique asbl (English: "Royal Belgian Zoological Society"), publishing the diamond open access journalThe Belgian Journal of Zoology

=== Germany ===
- Frankfurt Zoological Society (founded 1858), operated the Frankfurt Zoological Garden
- Deutsche Zoologische Gesellschaf (English: "German Zoological Society"), affiliated with Frontiers in Zoology
- Verein Zoologischer Garten München e.V. (English: "Society of the Zoological Garden of Munich", founded 1905), affiliated with the Hellabrunn Zoo
- Zoologische Gesellschaft für Arten- und Populationsschutz (English: "Zoological Society for the Conservation of Species and Populations", founded 1982), based in Munich and affiliated with the Angkor Centre for Conservation of Biodiversity
- Zoologische Gesellschaft in Hamburg (English: "Zoological Society of Hamburg", 1860–1920), operated the now-defunct Zoological Garden of Hamburg

=== Netherlands ===
- Koninklijke Nederlandse Dierkundige Vereniging (English: "Royal Dutch Zoological Society"), publishing Animal Biology
- Natura Artis Magistra (English: "Nature Is the Teacher of Art and Science"; founded 1838), a Royal Zoological society in Amsterdam operating the zoo Natura Artis Magistra and, formerly, the now-defunct Ethnographic Museum Artis

=== United Kingdom ===
- Royal Zoological Society of Scotland (founded 1909), operating the Edinburgh Zoo and Highland Wildlife Park
- Zoological Society of London (founded 1826), operating the London Zoo, Whipsnade Zoo, and Institute of Zoology, and publishing the Journal of Zoology
- Bristol, Clifton and West of England Zoological Society, affiliated with the Bristol Zoo and Wild Place Project
- Dudley and West Midlands Zoological Society (founded 1935), owns and runs Dudley Zoo
- Hints Zoological Society (founded 1954) and East Midlands Zoological Society (founded 1972), both founded by Molly Badham and Nathalie Evans
- North of England Zoological Society (founded 1934), operating the Chester Zoo
- Zoological Society of East Anglia, operating Africa Alive! and the Banham Zoo
- Zoological Society of Glasgow and West of Scotland (founded 1936), operated the now-defunct Glasgow Zoo
- Zoological Society of Wales (founded 1983), operating the Welsh Mountain Zoo

== North America ==
=== Canada ===
- Wildlife Conservation Society Canada (founded 2004), Canadian affiliate of the Wildlife Conservation Society
- Calgary Zoological Society (founded 1929), operating the Calgary Zoo
- Canadian Society of Zoologists, affiliated with the Canadian Journal of Zoology
- Kamloops Wildlife Park Society (founded 1965 as the Greater Kamloops Zoological Society), operating the British Columbia Wildlife Park
- Saskatoon Zoo Society (founded 1976 as the Saskatoon Regional Zoological Society), affiliated with the Forestry Farm Park and Zoo
- Zoological Society of Manitoba (founded 1956), associated with the Assiniboine Park Zoo
- Zoological Society of Montreal (founded 1964)

=== United States ===
==== Northeast ====
- Wildlife Conservation Society (founded 1895 as the New York Zoological Society), operating the Bronx Zoo, Central Park Zoo, New York Aquarium, Prospect Park Zoo, and Queens Zoo
- Boston Zoological Society, affiliated with the Franklin Park Zoo
- Buttonwood Park Zoological Society (founded 1969), affiliated with the Buttonwood Park Zoo
- Cape May County Zoological Society/ZooFriends (founded 1986), associated with the Cape May County Park & Zoo
- Erie Zoological Society (founded 1962), operating the Erie Zoo
- Staten Island Zoological Society (founded 1933), operating the Staten Island Zoo
- Zoological Society of Philadelphia (founded 1859), affiliated with the Philadelphia Zoo

==== Midwest ====
- Chicago Zoological Society (founded 1921), operating the Brookfield Zoo
- Detroit Zoological Society (founded 1911), operating the Detroit Zoo
- Fort Wayne Zoological Society (founded 1966), operating the Fort Wayne Children's Zoo
- Greater Minot Zoological Society (founded 1970), operating the Roosevelt Park Zoo
- Henry Vilas Park Zoological Society (founded 1914 as the Madison Zoological and Aquarium Society), associated with the Henry Vilas Zoo
- Indianapolis Zoological Society (founded 1944), operating the Indianapolis Zoo
- John Ball Zoological Society (founded 1949), affiliated with the John Ball Zoological Garden
- Lake Area Zoological Society (founded 1972), affiliated with the Bramble Park Zoo
- Lincoln Park Zoological Society (founded 1961), operating the Lincoln Park Zoo
- Potawatomi Zoological Society, operating the Potawatomi Zoo
- Potter Park Zoological Society (founded 1969 as the Friends of the Zoo Society), affiliated with the Potter Park Zoo
- Red River Zoological Society (founded 1993), operating the Red River Zoo
- Sedgwick County Zoological Society, associated with the Sedgwick County Zoo
- Toledo Zoological Society, operating the Toledo Zoo
- Zoological Society of Cincinnati (founded 1873), operating the Cincinnati Zoo and Botanical Garden
- Zoological Society of Milwaukee (founded 1910), affiliated with the Milwaukee County Zoo
- Zoological Society of St. Louis (founded 1910), affiliated with the Saint Louis Zoo

==== South ====
- Society for Integrative and Comparative Biology (founded 1902 as the American Society of Zoologists); based in McLean, Virginia; publishing Integrative and Comparative Biology (formerly titled American Zoologist) and Physiological and Biochemical Zoology
- Abilene Zoological Society, affiliated with the Abilene Zoological Gardens
- Alabama Zoological Society (founded 1971), affiliated with the Birmingham Zoo
- Baltimore City Zoological Society, affiliated with The Maryland Zoo in Baltimore
- Blue Ridge Zoological Society, operating the Mill Mountain Zoo
- Dallas Zoological Society (founded 1955), operating the Dallas Zoo
- Delaware Zoological Society (founded 1950), associated with the Brandywine Zoo
- Delmarva Zoological Society, affiliated with the Salisbury Zoo
- Fort Worth Zoological Association (founded 1939 as the Fort Worth Zoological Society), operating the Fort Worth Zoo
- Jacksonville Zoological Society (founded 1971), operating the Jacksonville Zoo and Gardens
- Lowry Park Zoological Society of Tampa (founded 1982 as the Lowry Park Zoo Association), operating the Lowry Park Zoo
- Maryland Zoological Society (founded 1974), affiliated with The Maryland Zoo in Baltimore
- Montgomery Area Zoological Society/Zoo Friends (founded 1976 as the Dixieland Zoological Society), affiliated with the Montgomery Zoo
- North Carolina Zoological Society (founded 1968), affiliated with the North Carolina Zoo
- Oklahoma Zoological Society/ZooFriends (founded 1954), affiliated with the Oklahoma City Zoo and Botanical Garden
- Zoological Society of the Palm Beaches (founded 1969), operating the Palm Beach Zoo
- Virginia Zoological Society (founded 1974 as Friends of the Zoo), affiliated with the Virginia Zoological Park

==== West ====
- Denver Zoological Society, affiliated with the Denver Zoo
- Fresno Zoological Society (1949–2006), affiliated with the Fresno Chaffee Zoo
- Portland Zoological Society, operated the Oregon Zoo
- Pueblo Zoological Society, operating the Pueblo Zoo
- Sacramento Zoological Society (founded 1958), operating the Sacramento Zoo
- San Francisco Zoological Society (founded 1954), operating the San Francisco Zoo
- Zoological Society of San Diego (founded 1916), doing business as San Diego Zoo Wildlife Alliance since 2021; operating the San Diego Zoo, San Diego Zoo Safari Park, San Diego Zoo Institute for Conservation Research, and San Diego Zoo Global Wildlife Conservancy

== Oceania ==
=== Australia ===
- Royal Zoological Society of New South Wales (founded 1879)
- Taronga Conservation Society (founded 1973), operating the Taronga Zoo and Taronga Western Plains Zoo
- Royal Zoological and Acclimatization Society of Victoria (1857–1957; founded as the Zoological Society of Victoria, renamed the Acclimatization Society of Victoria from 1861–70), operated the Melbourne Zoo from 1862–1937
- Royal Zoological Society of South Australia (founded 1878 as the South Australian Acclimatization and Zoological Society), doing business as Zoos South Australia; operating the Adelaide Zoo and Monarto Safari Park

=== New Zealand ===
- Auckland Zoological Society (founded 1929), affiliated with the Auckland Zoo
- Ōtorohanga Zoological Society
