= Acta Zoologica (disambiguation) =

Acta Zoologica is one of the world's leading zoological journals.

Acta Zoologica is also used in the title of the following scientific journals:

- Acta Zoologica Academiae Scientiarum Hungaricae
- Acta Zoologica Bulgarica
- Acta Zoologica Cracoviensia
- Acta Zoologica Fennica
- Acta Zoologica Lilloana
- Acta Zoologica Lituanica
- Acta Zoológica Mexicana
- Acta Zoologica Sinica
- Acta Zoologica Taiwanica
- Acta Zoologica Universitatis Comenianae
