= Zoology (disambiguation) =

Zoology is the scientific study of animals.

Zoology may also refer to:

- Zoology (journal), a scientific journal established in 1886
- Zoology (film), a 2016 Russian drama film directed by Ivan Tverdovsky
- Zoology (album), the debut studio album by the Philippine band The Zoo

== See also ==
- Animal science, a branch of agriculture
- Zoology journal (disambiguation)
- List of zoology journals
- Zoological Science, a scientific journal published by the Zoological Society of Japan
