= Terry Maple =

American ethologist, conservationist, and zoo director (1946–2023)

- Born: Terry Lee Maple; September 10, 1946; Chula Vista, California, U.S.
- Died: December 3, 2023 (aged 77); Mount Pleasant, South Carolina, U.S.
- Occupations: Ethologist, conservationist, zoo director

Terry Lee Maple (September 10, 1946 – December 3, 2023) was an American ethologist, wildlife conservationist, and zoo director.

Maple authored many publications on animal welfare. He was best known for his 18-year tenure as director, and later President and CEO, of Zoo Atlanta. He was credited with transforming the troubled zoo into a model institution and fiscally sound cultural attraction.

== Career ==
In 1984, Atlanta Mayor Andrew Young appointed Maple, then an animal behaviourist, to serve as interim director of the Atlanta Zoo. An investigation revealed the facility was in disrepair and plagued with problems from political infighting to scandal. In addition, the zoo's membership was revoked by the Association of Zoos and Aquariums, the national zoo association and regulatory body. Maple was appointed interim director and ultimately director. That same year, the zoo was listed in Parade magazine as one of the ten worst zoos in the United States. The negative publicity prompted a public outcry, and increased a growing public sentiment that the facility should be closed down.

In 1985, the management of zoo operations was put in the hands of a new private non-profit organization, the Atlanta-Fulton County Zoo, Inc, with Maple responsible for overseeing all departments from animal care and veterinary services to fundraising. The zoo was rebranded Zoo Atlanta.

Under Maple's leadership, the reputation of Atlanta's metropolitan zoo was restored and the zoo became a popular cultural attraction and pioneering zoological facility in terms of the management and study of endangered species. In partnership with Atlanta's WSB-television, the zoological organization won six Emmy Awards for local educational programming.

Maple retired from Zoo Atlanta in 2003 as the founding President and CEO and assumed the title of Zoo Director Emeritus.

Maple developed an organizational culture and instituted practices at Zoo Atlanta whereby evidence-based methods were starting to be employed. Zoo Atlanta emulated modern-day natural history museums, which have traditionally been considered more scholarly and scientific than zoos. Zoo Atlanta followed this approach in an effort to foster research activities and cultivate practices based on science. Through Maple's dual appointment he was able to establish a unique relationship between zoos and local universities.

Maple was President of the Association of Zoos and Aquariums (AZA) from 1998 to 1999.

Maple was the founding editor of the scientific journal Zoo Biology, which was originally published by John Wiley/Blackwell in association with the AZA. When Maple retired from editorial roles with Zoo Biology, he was bestowed the title of Editor Emeritus of the Journal, along with Donald Lindburg of the Zoological Society of San Diego and Dan Wharton, formerly of the Chicago Zoological Society.

== Research ==
Using his background on the behavior, welfare, and conservation of great apes, Maple developed ethological programming for Zoo Atlanta's lowland gorilla exhibit. The partnership between Georgia Tech and Zoo Atlanta permitted Maple and his staff to advance lowland gorilla conservation, exhibition, husbandry, propagation and research, for which the Zoo won the AZA's Edward H. Bean Award. The Zoo's work was made possible by a partnership with Yerkes National Primate Research Center of Emory University which loaned the gorillas and orangutans to the Zoo. The Zoo's gorilla exhibit is sponsored by Ford Motor Company and branded as the Ford African Rain Forest.

== Later career ==
Maple served from 2011 to 2014 as the San Francisco Zoo’s first "Professor-in- Residence" and the architect of their "Stanton Family Wellness Initiative" including applications to exhibit and facility design.

In his engagement as Professor-in-Residence, Maple was a mentor to keepers, curators, and veterinarians at the Jacksonville Zoo and Gardens. As a Scholar-in-Residence, he also taught and mentored students at the University of North Florida.

In 2005, Maple was granted a formal leave of absence from Georgia Tech to become the President/CEO of the Palm Beach Zoo. On Earth Day 2009, the Palm Beach Zoo opened the Melvin J. and Claire Levine Animal Care Complex. Maple retired as CEO of the Palm Beach Zoo in 2011. He resumed his affiliation with Florida Atlantic University and finished his thirteenth book, Zoo Animal Welfare (co-authored with Bonnie Perdue) published by Springer-Verlag in 2013.

== Death ==
Maple died on December 3, 2023, after complications from an infection; he was living in Mount Pleasant, South Carolina.

== Selected publications ==
- Zoo Animal Welfare (2013)
- Beyond Animal Welfare: The Art and Science of Wellness (2019)
