= Bulletin of the Iraq Natural History Museum =

- Discipline: Natural History
- Language: English
- Edited by: Razzaq Shalan Augul

Publication details
- History: 1961–present
- Publisher: University of Baghdad (Iraq)
- Frequency: Biannual
- Open access: Yes

Standard abbreviations
- ISO 4: Bull. Iraq Nat. Hist. Mus.

Indexing
- ISSN: 1017-8678 (print); 2311-9799 (web)

Links
- Journal homepage

Bulletin of the Iraq Natural History Museum is a peer-reviewed open access scholarly journal publishing original articles, article reviews, and case reports in the natural history sciences. It affiliated with the Iraq Natural History Research Center and Museum / University of Baghdad. The current editor-in-chief is Razzaq Shalan Augul.

== Abstracting and indexing ==
The journal is abstracted and indexed in:

- Scopus
- Zoological Record
