= JZS =

JZS may refer to:

- Jamalpur Zilla School, a secondary school in Bangladesh
- Journal of Zoological Systematics and Evolutionary Research, an English-language animal sciences journal
- Jelczańskie Zakłady Samochodowe, a Polish automotive company now known as Jelcz
