= Graham Budd =

British palaeontologist

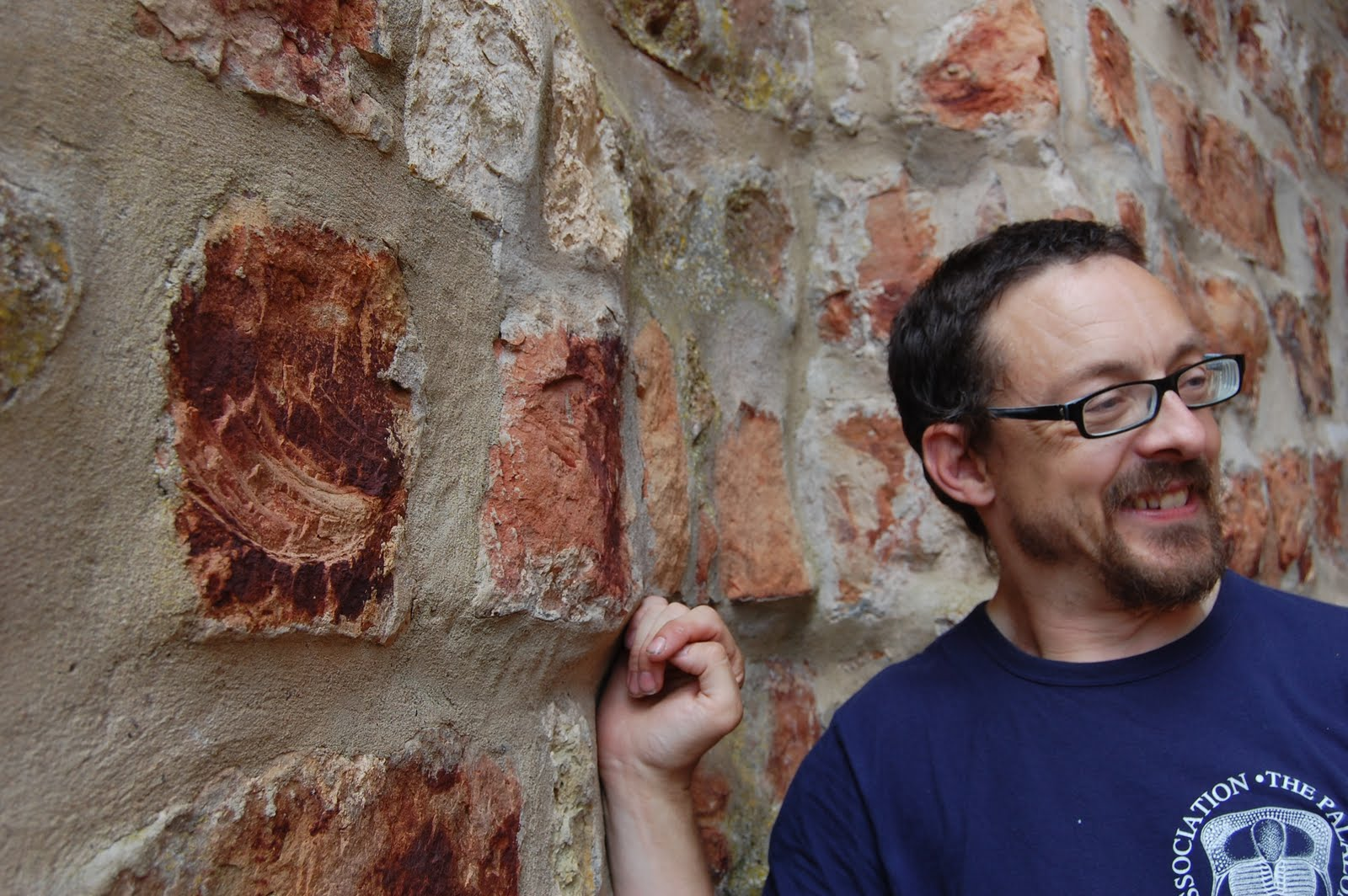
- Budd in 2011
- Born: 7 September 1968 (age 57); Colchester, England, United Kingdom
- Education: University of Cambridge
- Known for: Early bilaterian "Savannah" hypothesis
- Awards: Hodson Fund of the Palaeontological Association President's Medal of the Palaeontological Association Nathorst Prize of the Geologiska Foreningen
- Scientific career
- Fields: Palaeontology
- Workplaces: Uppsala University
- Doctoral advisor: Simon Morris; John Peel

Graham Edward Budd (born 7 September 1968) is a British palaeontologist. He is Professor and head of palaeobiology at Uppsala University.

Budd's research focuses on the Cambrian explosion and on the evolution and development, anatomy, and patterns of diversification of the Ecdysozoa, a group of animals that include arthropods.

== Life and work ==
Budd was born on 7 September 1968 in Colchester, England. He obtained his undergraduate degree at the University of Cambridge and remained there, in the Department of Earth Sciences, to continue his studies at a doctoral level by investigating the Sirius Passet fossil lagerstätte from the Cambrian of North Greenland. He finished his doctorate in 1994, with one of the findings being a new species of lobopodian, Kerygmachela. Budd then moved to Sweden as a postdoc along with his PhD supervisor John Peel.

Together with Sören Jensen he reintroduced the concepts of stem and crown groups to phylogenetics and is a major critic of molecular clocks current usage in determining the origin of animal and plant groups.

He has edited Acta Zoologica together with Lennart Olsson; he has also edited the Geological Magazine.

== Accolades ==
- Hodson Fund of the Palaeontological Association in 2002.
- President's Medal of the Palaeontological Association in 2015.
- Nathorst Prize of the Geologiska Foreningen in 2021.

== Selected publications ==
- G. E. Budd. 2002. A palaeontological solution to the arthropod head problem. Nature 417: 271-275.
- G. E. Budd. 2006. On the origin and evolution of major morphological characters. Biological Reviews 81: 609-628.
- G. E. Budd. 2017. The origin of the animals and a 'Savannah' hypothesis for early bilaterian evolution. Biological Reviews 92(1), 446-473

== See also ==
- Arthropod head problem
