= Silliman Journal =

- Discipline: Multidisciplinary
- Language: English
- Edited by: Margaret U. Alvarez

Publication details
- History: 1953-present
- Publisher: Silliman University (Philippines)
- Frequency: Biannual

Standard abbreviations
- ISO 4: Silliman J.

Indexing
- ISSN: 0037-5284

Links
- Journal homepage

The Silliman Journal is a biannual peer-reviewed academic journal published by Silliman University (Dumaguete, Philippines). The editor-in-chief is Margaret U. Alvarez. The journal was established in 1953, starting as a quarterly and interdisciplinary in content. The initial issues contained research papers and articles by faculty and graduate students, but eventually, contributions from non-Silliman scholars and scholars outside of the Philippines were also accepted. The initial publication of the journal was funded by the James W. Chapman Research Foundation.

The Silliman Journal generally accepts contributions in all fields from both Philippine and foreign scholars. Articles are required to have some relevance to the Philippines, Asian, or the Pacific regions. The journal publishes research articles, reviews, notes, and book reviews.

The journal is accredited with the Philippine Commission on Higher Education and is abstracted and indexed by The Zoological Record.
