= Zoological Science (journal) =

- Discipline: Zoology
- Language: English
- Edited by: Susumu Hyodo

Publication details
- History: 1984–present
- Publisher: Zoological Society of Japan (Japan)
- Frequency: Monthly
- Impact factor: 0.955 (2021)

Standard abbreviations
- ISO 4: Zool. Sci.

Indexing
- CODEN: ZOSCEX
- ISSN: 0289-0003
- OCLC no.: 51963016

Links
- Journal homepage

Zoological Science is a peer-reviewed scientific journal published by the Zoological Society of Japan covering the broad field of zoology. The journal was established in 1984 as a result of the merger of the Zoological Magazine (1888–1983) and Annotationes Zoologicae Japonenses (1897–1983), the former official journals of the Zoological Society of Japan. Zoological Science has been a BioOne member since 2007.

== See also ==
- List of zoology journals
