= Journal of Exotic Pet Medicine =

- Discipline: Veterinary medicine
- Language: English
- Edited by: Nicola Di Girolamo

Publication details
- Former name(s): Seminars in Avian and Exotic Pet Medicine
- History: 1992–present
- Publisher: Elsevier
- Frequency: Quarterly
- Impact factor: 0.582 (2018)

Standard abbreviations
- ISO 4: J. Exot. Pet Med.

Indexing
- ISSN: 1557-5063
- OCLC no.: 65284415

Links
- Journal homepage; Online access; Online archive; Journal page at publisher's website

Journal of Exotic Pet Medicine is a quarterly peer-reviewed medical journal published by Elsevier in cooperation with the Association of Exotic Mammal Veterinarians and the European Association of Avian Veterinarians. It was established in 1992 as Seminars in Avian and Exotic Pet Medicine, obtaining its current title in 2006. The editor-in-chief is Nicola Di Girolamo (Oklahoma State University).

== Abstracting and indexing ==
The journal is abstracted and indexed in the Science Citation Index Expanded, The Zoological Record, Global Health (Index Veterinarius, Veterinary Bulletin), CAB Abstracts, and Scopus. According to the Journal Citation Reports, the journal has a 2018 impact factor of 0.244.
