= Hemidonax pictus =

Scientific classification
- Kingdom: Animalia
- Phylum: Mollusca
- Class: Bivalvia
- Order: Venerida
- Family: Hemidonacidae
- Genus: Hemidonax
- Species: H. pictus

Binomial name
- Hemidonax pictus (Tryon, 1870)

Species of bivalve

Hemidonax pictus is a species of bivalve in the family Hemidonacidae.

== Recommended literature ==
- Ohn M. Healy, Paula M. Mikkelsen, Rüdiger Bieler fls (2008) Sperm ultrastructure in Hemidonax pictus (Hemidonacidae, Bivalvia, Mollusca): comparison with other heterodonts, especially Cardiidae, Donacidae and Crassatelloidea. Zoological Journal of the Linnean Society 153 (2), 325–347 doi:10.1111/j.1096-3642.2008.00385.x
