= Harald Rosenthal =

German hydrobiologist and fisheries scientist

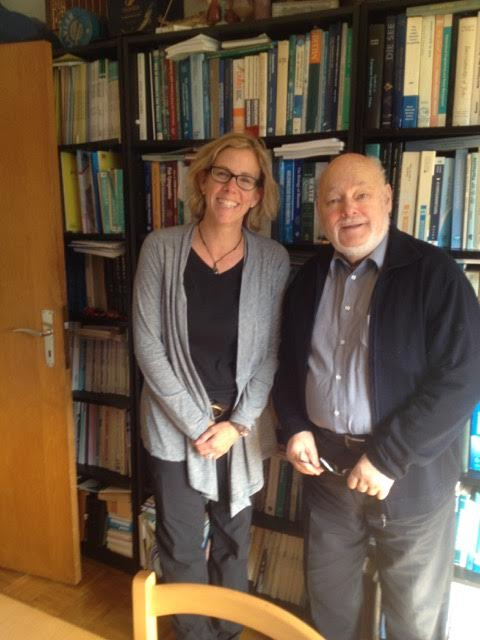
- Born: 9 June 1937 (age 89); Berlin
- Education: Freie Universität Berlin; Hamburg
- Known for: Work in fish farming, ecology, and international cooperation
- Scientific career
- Fields: Hydrobiology, fishery science
- Institutions: Kiel University

Harald Rosenthal (born 9 June 1937) is a German hydrobiologist and fisheries scientist known for his work in fish farming, ecology, and international cooperation.

== Life ==
Rosenthal was born and raised in Berlin. From 1957 to 1962, he studied zoology, botany, chemistry, geography, and philosophy at the Freie Universität Berlin (Free University of Berlin). From 1963 to 1968, he studied hydrobiology and fishery science in Hamburg.

He wrote his doctoral thesis in 1969 on mass rearing of larval herring and his habilitation thesis in 1981 on closed-circuit systems in fish farming and research. From 1989 to 2002, he was a professor at the Institut für Meereskunde (Institute for Marine Sciences) of Kiel University.

Rosenthal research focused on two areas:but

1. Aquaculture: Here, he concentrated on applied research on the one hand, particularly on closed-circuit fish farms, and ecological aspects on the other, in particular control and prevention of pollution, and sustainability especially in developing countries.
2. Ballast water: Rosenthal was one of the first to recognize and research the danger posed to ecosystems by the transport of marine life across huge distances in the ballast water of ships. He lobbied for regulations and other measures to combat this danger.

In addition to his own research, Rosenthal plays an important role in the international collaboration of hydrobiologists and aquaculturists, in particular between Canada and Germany as well as Israel and Germany.

Rosenthal is editor of the Journal of Applied Ichthyology and founder and president of the World Sturgeon Conservation Society (WSCS). He holds honorary doctorates of the universities of Edinburgh (1985), Moncton (1996), and Szczecin (2003) and is a member of the Royal Swedish Academy of Sciences.
