= Telosticta =

Scientific classification
- Kingdom: Animalia
- Phylum: Arthropoda
- Clade: Pancrustacea
- Class: Insecta
- Order: Odonata
- Suborder: Zygoptera
- Family: Platystictidae
- Subfamily: Protostictinae
- Genus: Telosticta; Dorr & Orr, 2012

Type species
- Telosticta feronia Lieftinck, 1933

Species
- See text

Genus of damselflies

Telosticta is a genus of damselflies in the family Platystictidae, and subfamily Protostictinae. It is endemic to Borneo and Palawan. The genus was established with Telosticta feronia as the type species. Currently, there are seventeen described species in Telosticta.

== Taxonomy ==
Telosticta was established to address an artificial taxonomic distinction made within the family, Platystictidae, particularly concerning the genera Drepanosticta and Protosticta.

Historically, Drepanosticta was defined by the presence of an anal bridge vein, a minute venational characteristic that distinguished it from Protosticta. However, this distinction has since, been deemed problematic as occasionally, specimens exhibit the Protosticta condition on one side and the Drepanosticta condition on the other. Additionally, this distinction is widely considered to be artificial as it separates closely related species on the basis of arbitrary structural differences. The limitations and inconsistencies of venation-based classification within the Old World Platystictidae have been critically examined by multiple researchers.

This issue became more apparent when Lieftinck (1933) described Protosticta feronia and Drepanosticta dupophila, noting their close resemblance despite their placement in separate genera based on minor venational differences. Currently, there are seventeen described species in Telosticta.

To resolve this, Telosticta was formally described as a new genus with Telosticta feronia designated as the type species.

=== Diagnosis ===
Telosticta has species ranging from medium to long in body length. They are generally dark in colour but always have pale antehumeral markings and at least some pale markings on the tip of the abdomen.

Males can be distinguished from other Platystictidae by several key morphological traits including:

- A narrow vertex;
- Flattened, ventrally projecting lateral processes on the posterior pronotal lobe;
- Pale antehumeral markings and terminal segment of penis with a well-developed convex tongue-like structure between the horns;
- Superior anal appendages that curve downward, with a dorsal basal process or bulbous swelling; and
- An inferior anal appendage featuring an internal subapical spine and a scoop-like apical modification.

== Etymology ==
The genus name Telosticta is a feminine noun. Its prefix, Telo, originates from the Greek word τ λος (télos), meaning "toll," and is named in honor of Jan van Tol, whose surname originates from the Dutch word of the same meaning, for his significant contributions to the study of the family Platystictidae. The suffix, sticta, is a common generic ending within the family.

== External morphology ==
Telosticta have predominantly black-coloured heads, with pale areas on the face. The top of the head is narrow, with the eyes nearly touching at the vertex.

The thorax is mostly pale at the front, becoming darker towards the rear. A distinctive feature in males is a pair of downward-pointing, flattened processes on the back of the pronotum, sometimes referred to as “remarkable pending appendages.” These structures are less developed or absent in females. The synthorax is bronzy-black with pale markings on the sides, and the legs are mostly pale.

The abdomen is long and slim, mostly dark above, with pale rings or markings, especially on the rear segments. Males have distinct terminal appendages used in mating. The superior appendages have complex internal and external projections that vary between species. The inferior appendages are scoop-like, often with setae, and typically feature an inward-facing spine near the base.

== Geographical distribution ==
Telosticta is endemic to Southeast Asia. Of the 17 named species in this genus, 16 occur in Borneo, while T. paruatia is found in Palawan. Within Borneo, 15 species have been recorded in Sarawak, 1 in Brunei, and some occurrences have also been documented in Sabah. However, compared to Sarawak and Brunei, relatively little sampling of T. Odonata in habitats suitable for Telosticta has been conducted in Kalimantan and Sabah.

== Habitat ==
Although the habitat preferences of Telosticta species remain presently unclear, available records and research suggest that members of this genus seem to favour forested stream environments typically in hilly or mountainous terrain. They also seem to have some tolerance to disturbance, although it is noted that more research is needed to fully understand their ecological requirements and resilience to habitat changes.

Telosticta berawan for instance, has been recorded in the Paya Maga Conservation Area in Sarawak, where it inhabits moderately high gradient stream systems in a disturbed forest.

Similarly, Telosticta ulubaram has been recorded in the Ravenscourt Forest Management Unit (FMU) in Sarawak. Although it appears to be relatively common in the area, it is typically encountered at low densities. Field surveys in the Ravenscourt region have documented T. ulubaram along various steep, rocky forest streams and tributaries. While the species has been observed in forest areas that have been disturbed by logging, earlier records were primarily from pristine habitats or areas subjected only to more gradual or low-intensity disturbances, rather than large-scale commercial logging. This suggests that T. ulubaram may have some tolerance to habitat modification, though it may still show a preference for less disturbed environments.

== Species ==
According to the Global Biodiversity Information Facility (GBIF) and recent taxonomic revisions, the genus Telosticta comprises the following species:

- Telosticta belalongensis Dow & Orr, 2012
- Telosticta berawan Dow & Orr, 2012
- Telosticta bidayuh Dow & Orr, 2012
- Telosticta dayak Dow & Orr, 2012
- Telosticta dupophila Lieftinck, 1933
- Telosticta feronia Lieftinck, 1933
- Telosticta fugispinosa Dow, Afendy & Rahman, 2016
- Telosticta gading Dow & Orr, 2012
- Telosticta iban Dow, 2014
- Telosticta janeus Dow & Orr, 2012
- Telosticta kajang Dow & Orr, 2012
- Telosticta longigaster Dow & Orr, 2012
- Telosticta paruatia van Tol, 2005
- Telosticta santubong Dow & Orr, 2012
- Telosticta serapi Dow & Orr, 2012
- Telosticta tubau Dow, 2010
- Telosticta ulubaram Dow & Orr, 2012

The genus Telosticta was formally established by Dow and Orr in 2012, with its description published in Volume 60[2] of The Raffles Bulletin of Zoology and Telosticta feronia. In that publication, eleven species were newly described and assigned directly to the newly created genus. In addition, three previously described species were transferred from other genera into Telosticta: Drepanosticta dupophila, Protosticta paruatia, and Protosticta tubau. The genus was also redefined to accommodate Protosticta feronia, which is now recognized as Telosticta feronia.

Since the original 2012 publication, two additional species have been described and added to the genus: Telosticta iban and Telosticta fugispinosa; both of which are also listed in GBIF.
