= Index to Organism Names =

Online taxonomic database

- Abbreviation: ION
- Formation: 2000
- Headquarters: York, United Kingdom
- Main organ: Website
- Parent organization: Clarivate Analytics
- Website: www.organismnames.com/query.htm

The Index to Organism Names (ION) is an extensive compendium of scientific names of taxa at all ranks in the field of zoology, compiled from the Zoological Record (later supplemented with content from Sherborn's Index Animalium) by its operators as a publicly accessible internet resource. Initially developed by BIOSIS, its ownership then passed to Thomson Reuters and is currently with Clarivate Analytics.

== History ==
ION was initially developed as a freely available, web accessible component of a larger project, "TRITON" (the Taxonomy Resource and Index To Organism Names system) by BIOSIS, the then publishers of the Zoological Record ("ZR") and Biological Abstracts, in approximately 2000. As originally released it covered all animal names (sensu lato) reported in Zoological Record since 1978, along with names from some other groups not covered by the Zoological Record contributed by several partner organizations (the latter were subsequently deprecated in the system). Its initially stated aim was to provide basic nomenclatural and hierarchy information, plus ZR volume occurrence counts (reflecting use in the literature) for animal names, to identify the taxonomic group to which an organism belongs, and to link to further information from ZR (or initially, other collaborating organization).

By 2006, the BIOSIS products had been purchased by Thomson Scientific, subsequently Thomson Reuters, who continued and extended the ION database (example archived search interface here) using the URL www.organismnames.com, where it continues to reside. The Intellectual Property and Science division of Thomson Reuters was subsequently acquired by Clarivate Analytics who continue to make ION available (as at mid 2019).

== Included content ==
In its initial release, the Index contained content from Zoological Record dating back to 1978, which was subsequently extended to the full span of the Zoological Record commencing in 1864. In 2011, Nigel Robinson of Thomson Reuters described an in-progress upgrade of the database to include an additional >200,000 names from a digitised version of Sherborn's Index Animalium, extending the content of ION back to the commencement of official zoological nomenclature in 1758. As at 2019, the Index contained over 2 million newly published names from 1758 onwards (with a small gap around the period 1850-1864 corresponding to the difference between the end of coverage of Index Animalium and the commencement of the "Zoological Record"), out of a total complement of over 5 million name instances, each with an associated unique numeric identifier (ION LSID).
