= Lennart Olsson =

Swedish zoologist and embryologist

Lennart Olsson (born 1961) is a Swedish zoologist and embryologist, professor of comparative zoology at the University of Jena, Germany.

Olsson focuses his research primarily on the embryological development of the vertebrate head. He is also a major contributor to the history of ideas in comparative anatomy.

Olsson edits the journal Acta Zoologica together with Graham Budd.
