= Hungarian Natural History Museum =

Natural history museum in Budapest, Hungary

Coordinates: 47°28′56″N 19°05′08″E

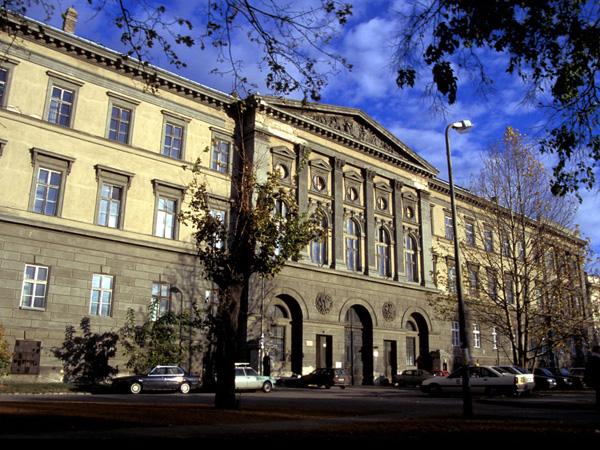
Ludovika Academy, Budapest, the present site of the museum

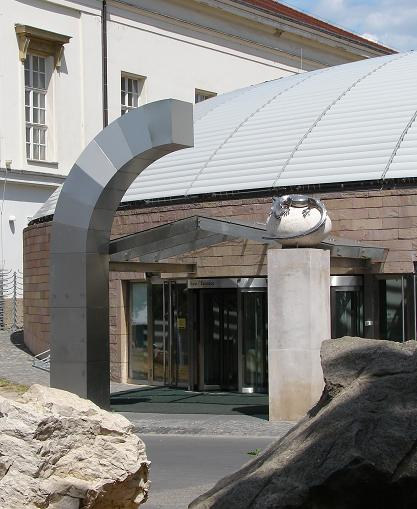
The main entrance to the exhibitions on Ludovika Square

The Hungarian Natural History Museum (Hungarian: Magyar Természettudományi Múzeum) in Budapest, dating back to 1802, houses the largest natural history collections of Hungary and the region.

== History of the museum ==
=== Foundation ===
In 1802, Count Ferenc Széchényi offered his library and his numismatic collection for the benefit of the Hungarian nation, so as to establish the base of a future national library, and a scientific and education center. This foundation gave rise to the Hungarian National Museum (and the Széchényi Library). Within the museum, the mineral collection of Julianna Festetics, the wife of the count, served as the origin of the future natural history collections.

The first paleontological collection was a gift of Archduke Rainer in 1811, and the first zoological collection was bought in the same year. In 1818 the late Pál Kitaibel's herbarium was offered to the museum, giving rise to the new Botanical department.

At the time of Hungary's revolution against the Austrian Empire in 1848, the mineral collection harbored about 13.000 specimens and the zoological collection about 35.000 specimens. In the period after the fall of the revolution, however, the only major change was the acquisition of the collections of the Royal Hungarian Natural History Society in 1856.

From 1870, the Hungarian National Museum had separate departments zoology, botany, and mineralogy. The size of these collections exceeded 1 million specimens at by the end of the nineteenth century.

=== Between the World Wars ===
In 1927, when Budapest hosted the Tenth World Congress of Zoology, the insect collection harbored about 3 million specimens, thus it had to be moved to a building in Baross Street. The ever-increasing collections were too crowded and difficult to maintain within the framework of the National Museum, thus the partially separate Natural History Museum was established in 1933.

Most of the botanical collections perished during the war.

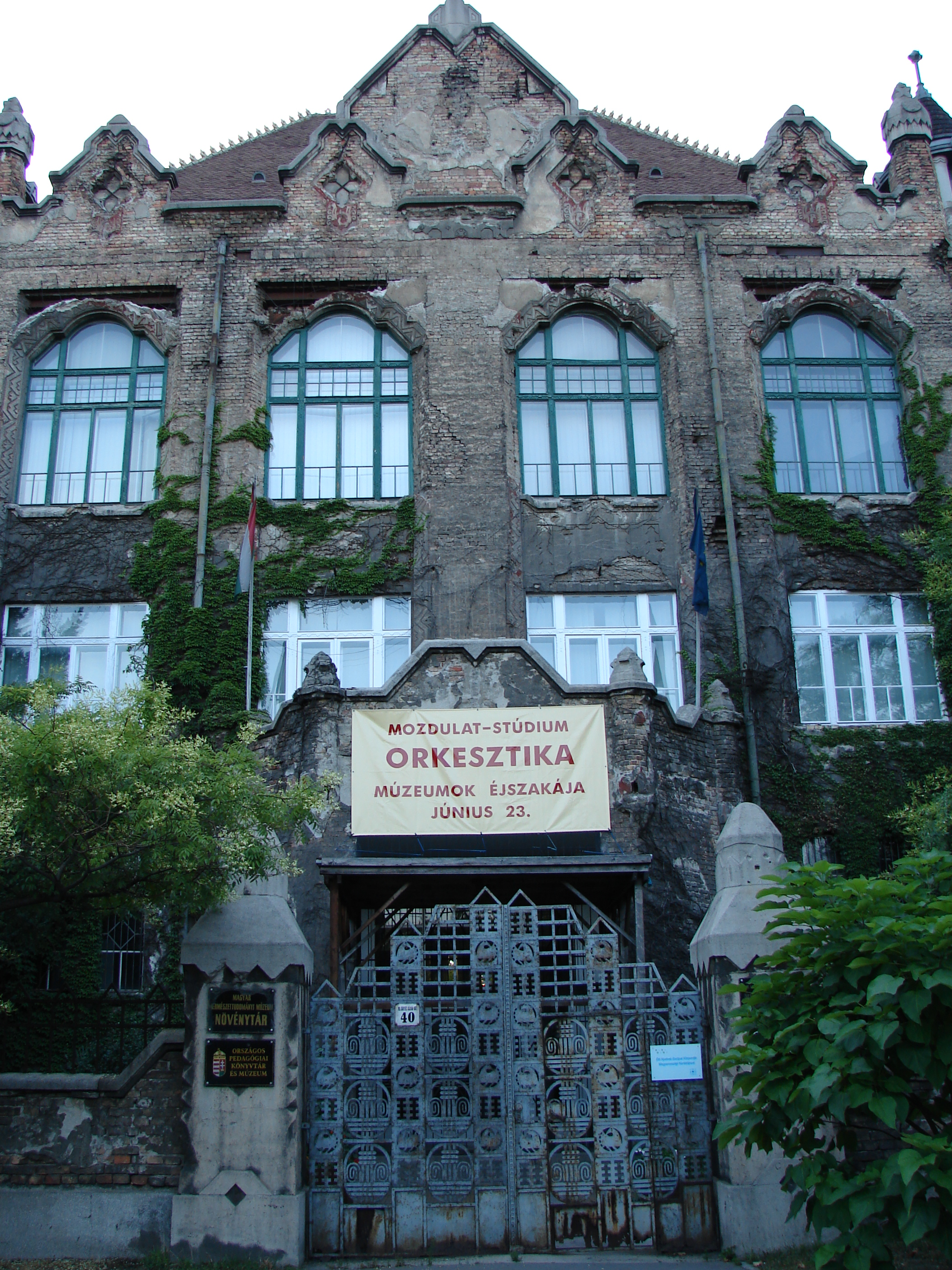
Botanical collections are still housed in this historical building on Könyves Kálmán Street, but are not open for visitors

=== After the Second World War ===
Soon after the war, the museum opened its Department of Anthropology, that now is one of the ten largest collections in Europe.

The research restarting in this period was focused mostly on the Hungarian flora and fauna.

During the 1956 revolution against the Soviet occupation, artillery shots hit the main building of the National Museum. The Africa-exhibition and the majority of mineralogical and paleontological collections perished. Furthermore, the Baross Street building also was hit a few days later. 36,000 stuffed birds, 22,000 avian eggs, 13,000 fish, 40,000 amphibians and reptiles, 500,000 molluscs, 60,000 dragonflies, and 200,000 dipterans were burnt, together with 100,000 volumes of scientific books and reprints. (Many of the animal specimens had been kept in alcohol.)

Few years after the fall of the revolution, Zsigmond Széchenyi made game-hunting expeditions to Africa to replace what was lost at the Africa exhibition, at least partially. From the 1960s and 1970s the museum's researchers made frequent trips to third world Soviet allies, such as North-Korea, Vietnam, Cuba, and Mongolia, so now the museum houses considerable collections referring to the flora and fauna of these countries up to the present.

In 1979, the Department of Botany moved to a historical building designed by Ödön Lechner, one of the most prestigious architects in the country.

== Contemporary history ==
The Natural History Museum, departing from the National Museum had no separate exhibition space up to the early 1990s, and the collections were growing steadily, thus all available space became overcrowded again. The Hungarian Government decided to move the museum to the building of Ludovika Academy: a historical site built originally as the Military Academy of Hungary. Renovations of these worn buildings started, but by 2007, had not been completed.

Departments of Anthropology, Mineralogy and Petrology, Geology and Paleontology, and the Library already are housed in Ludovika. Furthermore, the bird and mammal collections of the Zoology department, the Molecular Genetics Lab, Paleontological Research Group, and the Animal Ecology Research Group of the Hungarian Academy of Sciences-Hungarian Natural History Museum also are found here.

Exhibitions opened in the Ludovika buildings (Budapest, Ludovika Square 2–6) in 1996. Open 10:00–18:00 every day except for Tuesday.

In 2015, the museum received a mummy identified as that of a monk, Liuquan, a Buddhist master of the Chinese Medical School, which came from the Drents Museum in Amersfoort. It will be on display through May 2015. The mummy had been contained within a statue of Buddha that is reported to date to the eleventh or twelfth century.

== Functions ==
The museum has the following responsibilities:

- to maintain and enlarge collections,
- to carry out scientific research, mostly in fields related to the collections,
- to present collections and research results to the public by means of permanent and temporary exhibitions.

== Structure ==
The main Departments:

- Dept. of Anthropology
- Dept. of Zoology
- Dept. of Botany
- Dept. of Mineralogy and Petrology
- Dept. of Geology and Paleontology
- Library

Furthermore, the Department of Education and Exhibitions is responsible for planning and building exhibitions, for organising visitor-friendly, interactive programs, and also for advancing museum-based education activities.

== Publications ==
The museum publishes several books and four periodicals, including Acta Zoologica Academiae Scientiarum Hungaricae.

== Gallery ==
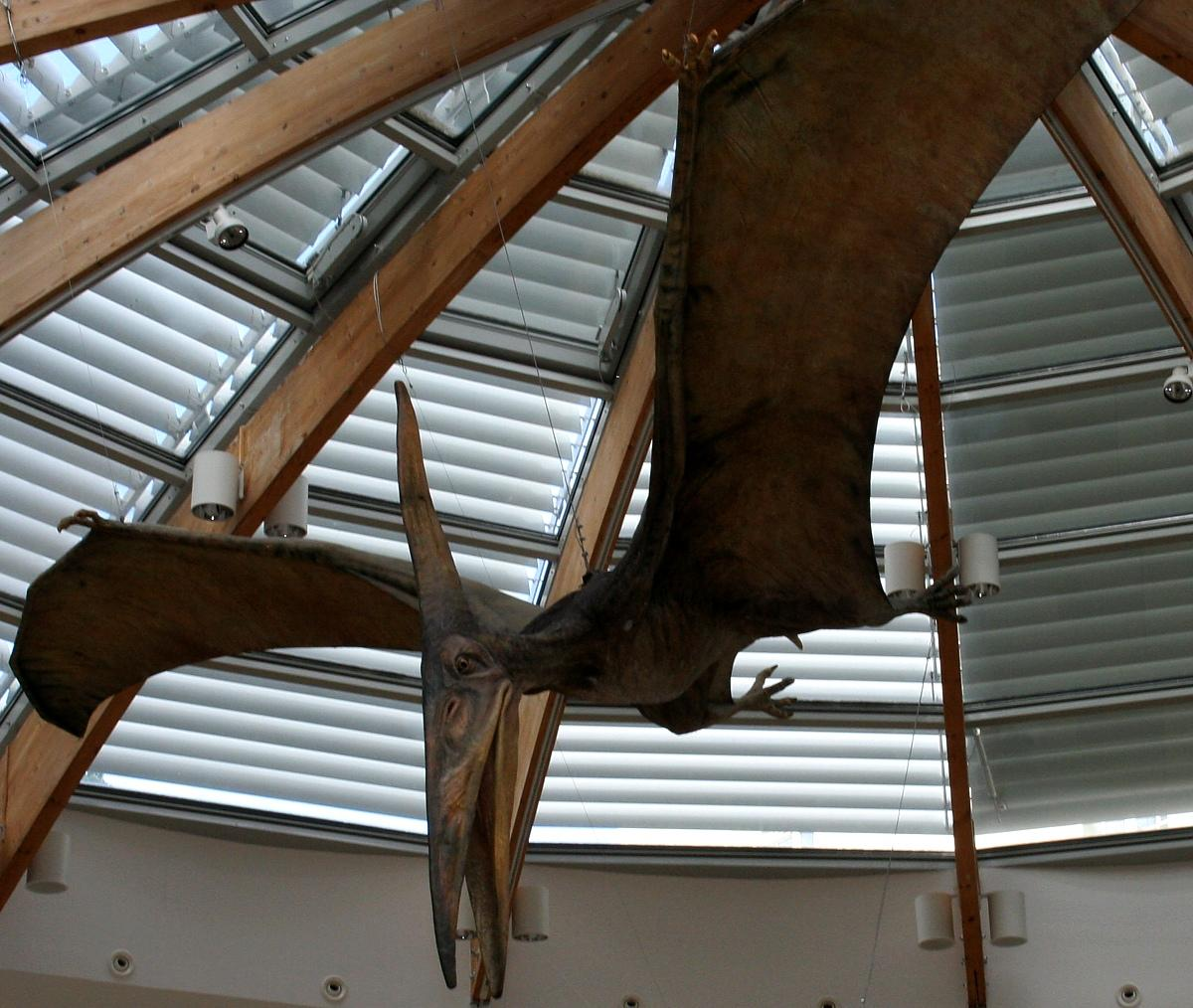

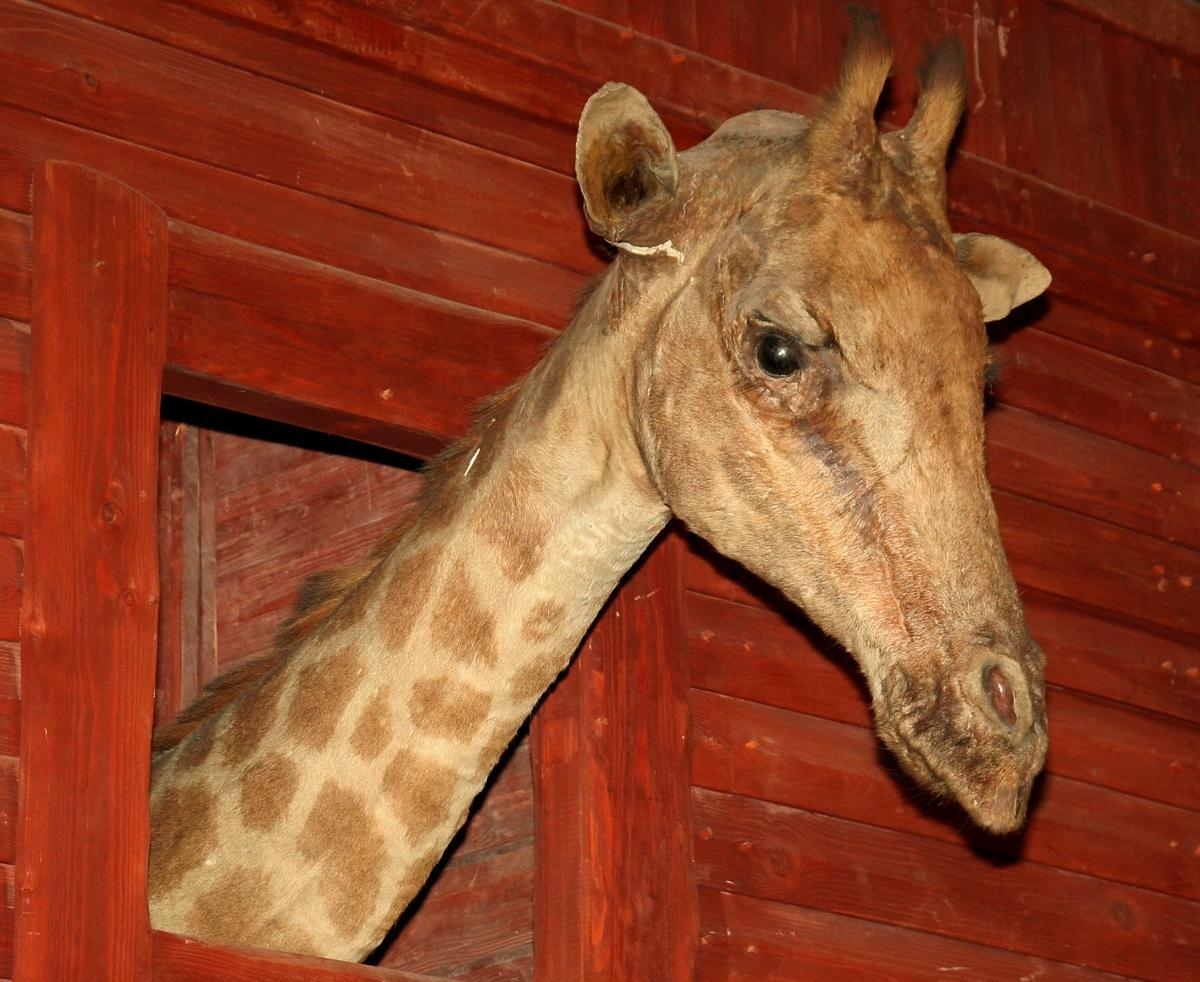

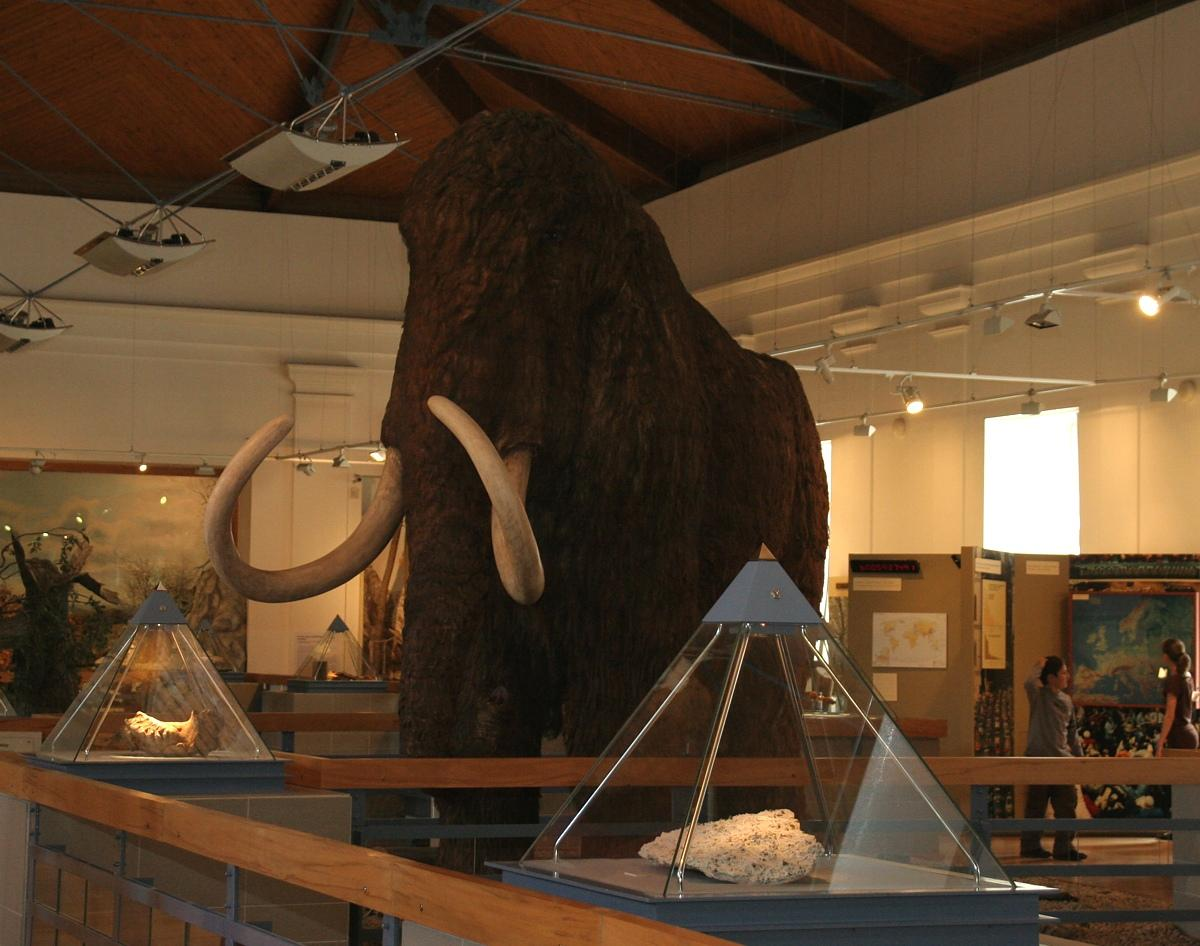

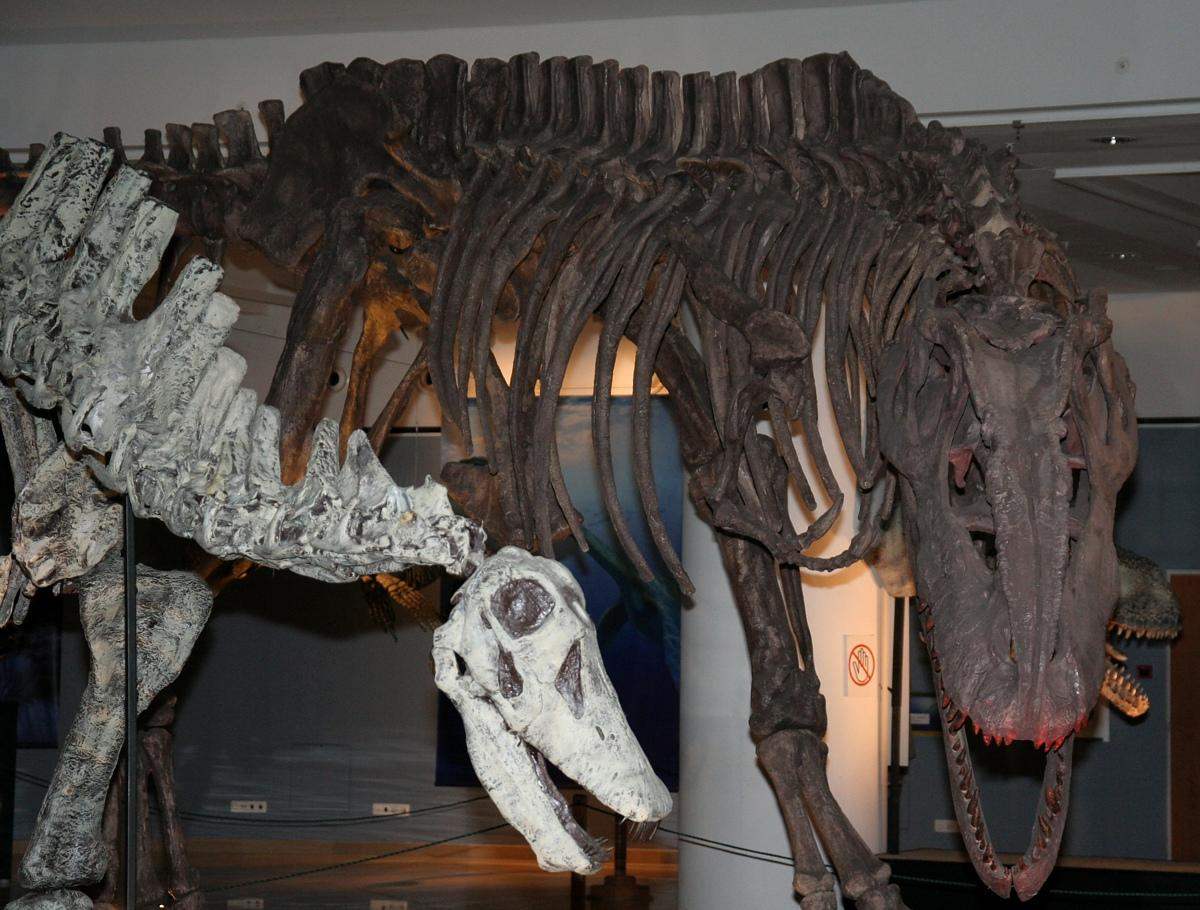
