= North-Western Journal of Zoology =

Open-access journal

- Discipline: Zoology
- Language: English
- Edited by: Istvan Sas, Severus D. Covaciu-Marcov

Publication details
- History: 2005–present
- Publisher: University of Oradea (Romania)
- Frequency: Biannually
- Open access: Yes
- Impact factor: 0.733 (2016)

Standard abbreviations
- ISO 4: North-West. J. Zool.

Indexing
- ISSN: 1584-9074 (print); 1843-5629 (web)

Links
- Journal homepage

The North-Western Journal of Zoology is an open access peer-reviewed scientific journal on zoology and animal ecology. It was established in 2005, and is the official journal of the Herpetological Club of Oradea (Romania).

The journal is indexed and abstracted in the Science Citation Index Expanded, The Zoological Record, Scopus, and EBSCOhost.

== See also ==
- List of zoology journals
