= Wallace Arthur =

Irish zoologist

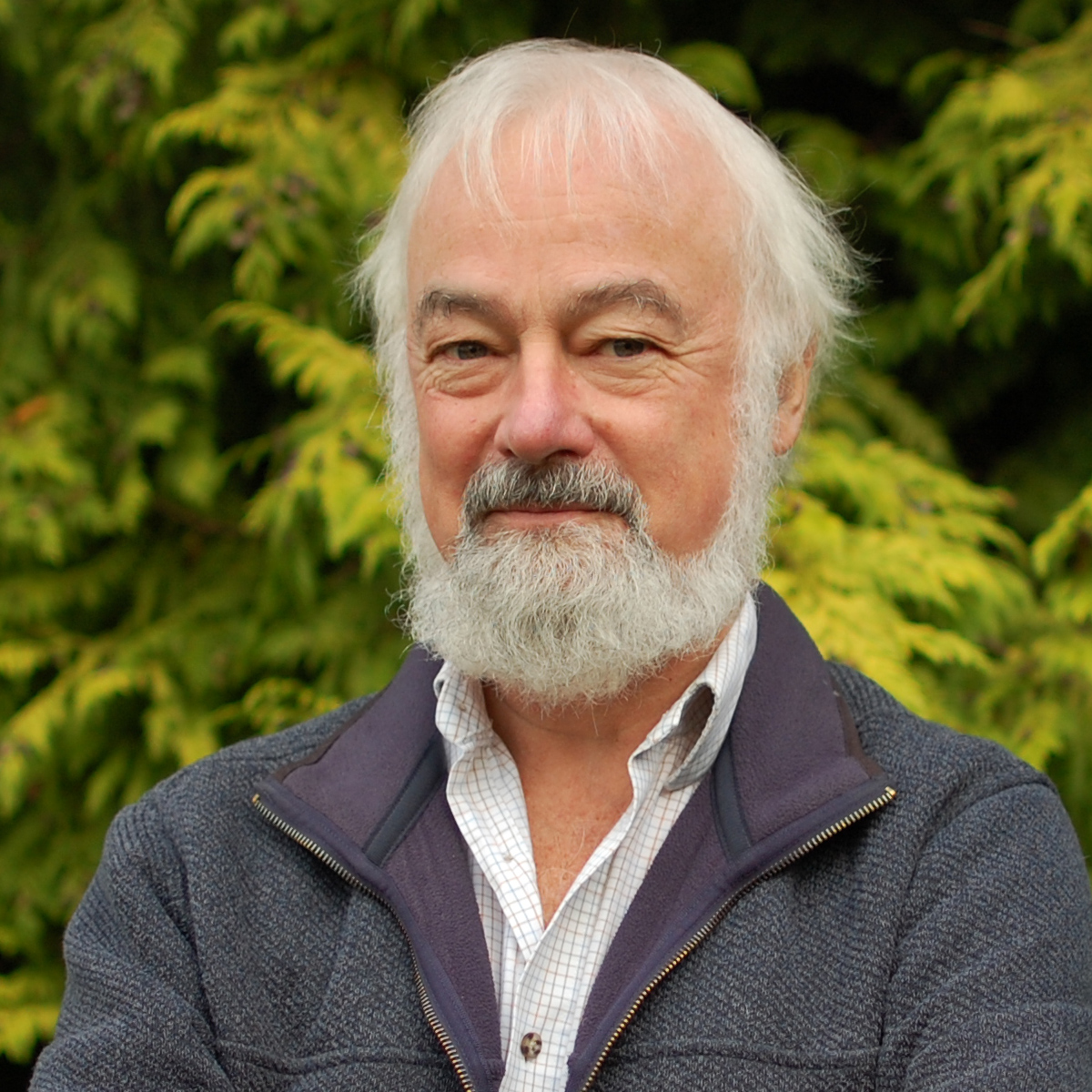
- Wallace Arthur in 2016
- Born: 30 March 1952 (age 74); Belfast, Northern Ireland
- Education: University of Ulster; University of Nottingham
- Known for: evo-devo, popular science
- Scientific career
- Fields: Evolutionary Biology
- Workplaces: University of Galway

Wallace Arthur (born 30 March 1952) is an evolutionary biologist and science writer. He is Emeritus Professor of Zoology at the University of Galway. His most recent book is Parallel Worlds: Evolution of Life Across the Cosmos, published by World Scientific, which focuses on the probable nature of extraterrestrial life, and in particular on the question of whether that life is likely to be broadly similar to life on Earth. He was one of the founding editors of the journal Evolution & Development, serving as an editor for nearly 20 years. He has held visiting positions at Harvard University, Darwin College Cambridge and the University of Warmia and Mazury in Olsztyn, Poland.

== Early life and education ==
Wallace Arthur was born in Belfast, Northern Ireland, in 1952. He attended Friends School Lisburn and Campbell College Belfast. He received a BSc in biology from the University of Ulster in 1973 and a PhD in evolutionary biology from the University of Nottingham in 1977.

== Scientific work ==
Arthur describes himself as "a bit of a maverick" who likes "making connections across disciplinary boundaries". His early work was at the interface between evolution and ecology, his later work at the interface between evolution and development, or ‘evo-devo’. His main contributions have been on the origin of animal body plans, the role of developmental bias in evolution, and the evolution of arthropod segmentation. His most recent books explore the interface between biology and astronomy, with two key themes: the likelihood of life having evolved on multiple exoplanets, and the nature of that life being probably not too different to life on Earth.

Arthur is a proponent of an expanded evolutionary synthesis that takes into account progress in the field of evo-devo.

== Books ==
- Mechanisms of Morphological Evolution: 1984, Wiley
- Theories of Life: Darwin, Mendel and Beyond: 1987, Penguin
- The Niche in Competition and Evolution: 1987, Wiley
- A Theory of the Evolution of Development: 1988, Wiley
- The Green Machine: Ecology and the Balance of Nature: 1990, Blackwell
- The Origin of Animal Body Plans: 1997, Cambridge University Press
- Biased Embryos and Evolution: 2004, Cambridge University Press
- Creatures of Accident: The Rise of the Animal Kingdom: 2006, Hill & Wang (Farrar, Straus & Giroux)
- Evolution: A Developmental Approach: 2011, Wiley-Blackwell
- Evolving Animals: 2014, Cambridge University Press
- Life through Time and Space: 2017, Harvard University Press
- The Biological Universe: Life in the Milky Way and Beyond: 2020, Cambridge University Press
- Understanding Evo-Devo: 2021, Cambridge University Press
- Understanding Life in the Universe: 2022, Cambridge University Press
- Parallel Worlds: Evolution of Life Across the Cosmos: 2025, World Scientific
