= Zoomorphology =

- Discipline: Zoology
- Language: English

Publication details
- Former names: Zeitschrift für Morphologie der Tiere; Zeitschrift für Morphologie und Ökologie der Tiere
- Publisher: Springer Science+Business Media
- Frequency: Quarterly

Standard abbreviations
- ISO 4: Zoomorphology

Indexing
- Zoomorphology
- ISSN: 0720-213X (print); 1432-234X (web)
- Zoomorphologie
- ISSN: 0340-6725 (print); 2365-0109 (web)
- Zeitschrift für Morphologie der Tiere
- ISSN: 0044-3131 (print); 2365-0095 (web)
- Zeitschrift für Morphologie und Ökologie der Tiere
- ISSN: 0372-9389 (print); 2365-0087 (web)

Links
- Journal homepage

Zoomorphology is a quarterly academic journal published by Springer-Verlag Germany of Berlin, Germany. The journal has been published earlier under the names Zoomorphologie, Zeitschrift für Morphologie der Tiere, and Zeitschrift für Morphologie und Ökologie der Tiere.

According to EBSCOhost, it "features original papers based on morphological investigation of invertebrates and vertebrates at the macroscopic, microscopic and ultrastructural levels, including embryological studies."

== See also ==
- List of zoology journals
