= Sulcosticta =

Scientific classification
- Kingdom: Animalia
- Phylum: Arthropoda
- Clade: Pancrustacea
- Class: Insecta
- Order: Odonata
- Suborder: Zygoptera
- Family: Platystictidae
- Subfamily: Protostictinae
- Genus: Sulcosticta van Tol, 2005

Genus of damselflies

Sulcosticta is a genus of shadowdamsel in the damselfly family Platystictidae, and subfamily Protostictinae. There are about five described species in Sulcosticta.

== Species ==
These five species belong to the genus Sulcosticta:

- Sulcosticta pallida van Tol, 2005
- Sulcosticta sierramadrensis Villanueva, Van Der Ploeg & Van Weerd, 2011
- Sulcosticta striata van Tol, 2005
- Sulcosticta vantoli Villanueva & Schorr, 2011
- Sulcosticta viticula van Tol, 2005
