= African Zoology =

- Discipline: Zoology
- Language: English
- Edited by: T Wossler & C Baker

Publication details
- Former names: Zoologica Africana, South African Journal of Zoology
- History: 1965–present
- Publisher: Zoological Society of Southern Africa (South Africa)
- Frequency: Quarterly (online); Biannually (print)
- Impact factor: 0.86 (2019)

Standard abbreviations
- ISO 4: Afr. Zool.

Indexing
- ISSN: 1562-7020
- LCCN: 00227123
- OCLC no.: 44395820

Links
- Journal homepage; Online access at BioOne; Latest Issue

African Zoology is a biannual peer-reviewed scientific journal that covers any aspect of zoology relevant to Africa and its surrounding oceans, seas, and islands. It is published by the Zoological Society of Southern Africa. It publishes topical reviews, full-length papers, short communications, and book reviews.

== History ==
The journal was established by the Zoological Society of Southern Africa in 1965 as Zoologica Africana, which was renamed to South African Journal of Zoology in 1979, when the South African Bureau of Publications became its publisher. In 2000, the journal returned to the society and obtained its current name.

== Abstracting and indexing ==
African Zoology is abstracted and indexed in Biological Abstracts, Chemical Abstracts, Current Advances in Biology, GeoAbstracts, Science Citation Index, and The Zoological Record. According to the Journal Citation Reports, the journal has a 2019 impact factor of 0.86.

== See also ==
- List of zoology journals
