= Evolution & Development =

- Discipline: Biology
- Language: English
- Edited by: Rudolf A. Raff

Publication details
- History: 1999-present
- Publisher: Wiley-Blackwell
- Impact factor: 3.179 (2009)

Standard abbreviations
- ISO 4: Evol. Dev.

Indexing
- ISSN: 1520-541X (print); 1525-142X (web)
- OCLC no.: 41390326

Links
- Journal homepage

Evolution & Development is a peer-reviewed scientific journal publishing material at the interface of evolutionary and developmental biology. Within evolutionary developmental biology, it has the aim of aiding a broader synthesis of biological thought in these two areas. Its scope ranges from paleontology and population biology, to developmental and molecular biology, including mathematics and the history and philosophy of science.

It was established in 1999 by five biologists: Wallace Arthur, Sean B. Carroll, Michael Coates, Rudolf Raff, and Gregory Wray. It is published by Wiley-Blackwell on behalf of the Society for Integrative and Comparative Biology.
