= Paul Cooper (academic) =

Paul Cooper as of 2024 is an American zoologist, and the editor-in-chief of the Australian Journal of Zoology. He was appointed associate professor, in the College of Medicine, Biology and Environment of Australian National University in 1987–present.

== Background ==
He received his PhD from UCLA by investigating water balance in desert beetles. He obtained postdoctoral positions at University of Tennessee-Knoxville, University of Arizona and University of British Columbia and La Trobe University. Directly following this last position, in 1987 he was appointed as a contract lecturer at Australian National University. Cooper has lectured in physiological, behavioral and introductory ecology; invertebrate and vertebrate zoology; entomology; and courses in physiology. He was awarded a 2015 Award for Excellence in Education by the ANU Colleges of Science. Cooper's areas of expertise are life histories, crop and pasture protection (pests, diseases and weeds), invertebrate biology, comparative physiology, animal neurobiology, animal physiology biophysics, and animal physiology systems.
