= Acta Zoologica Cracoviensia =

Peer-reviewed academic journal

- Discipline: Biology
- Language: English
- Edited by: Ewa Krzemińska; Katarzyna Kozakiewicz; Paweł Matus; Sabina Denkowska; Kamil Fijorek

Publication details
- History: 1956–present
- Publisher: Polish Academy of Sciences
- Frequency: Biannual
- Open access: Yes
- License: CC BY
- Impact factor: 0.3

Standard abbreviations
- ISO 4: Acta Zool. Crac.

Indexing
- ISSN: 0065-1710 (print); 2300-0163 (web)
- ISSN: 2299-6060

Links
- Journal homepage

Acta Zoologica Cracoviensia is a rapid open-access peer-reviewed journal published by the Institute of Systematics and Evolution of Animals, Polish Academy of Sciences. The current editor-in-chief is Ewa Krzemińska (Polish Academy of Sciences).

The journal was established in 1956, and issues started being made available online from December 2004. From 2005 to 2011, the journal was split into two series:

- Acta Zoologica Cracoviensia – Series A: Vertebrata
- Acta Zoologica Cracoviensia - Series B: Invertebrata

Since 2018, the journal has moved to an electronic-only publication model.

The journal covers systematics, phylogeny, biogeography, ecology and paleontology of animals, including descriptions of single species. Some of the most cited publications from the journal are paleontological reports.

== Abstracting and indexing ==
The journal is abstracted and indexed in:

- Biological Abstracts
- BIOSIS
- Zoological Record
