= Australian Journal of Zoology =

- Discipline: Zoology
- Language: English
- Edited by: Paul Cooper

Publication details
- History: 1953–present
- Publisher: CSIRO Publishing (Australia)
- Frequency: Bimonthly
- Impact factor: 1.073 (2021)

Standard abbreviations
- ISO 4: Aust. J. Zool.

Indexing
- ISSN: 0004-959X (print); 1446-5698 (web)

Links
- Journal homepage

The Australian Journal of Zoology is a bimonthly peer-reviewed scientific journal published by CSIRO Publishing. It covers research on all aspects of zoology, with a special focus on the fauna of Australia. The editor-in-chief is Paul Cooper (Australian National University).

== Abstracting and indexing ==
The journal is abstracted and indexed in AGRICOLA, Elsevier Biobase, Biological Abstracts, BIOSIS Previews, CAB Abstracts, Chemical Abstracts Service, Current Contents/Agriculture, Biology & Environmental Sciences, Science Citation Index Expanded, Scopus, and The Zoological Record. According to the Journal Citation Reports, the journal has a 2021 impact factor of 1.073.

== See also ==
- List of zoology journals
