= Caribbean Herpetology =

- Discipline: Herpetology
- Language: English
- Edited by: S. Blair Hedges

Publication details
- History: 2010–present
- Open access: Yes

Standard abbreviations
- ISO 4: Caribb. Herpetol.

Indexing
- ISSN: 2333-2468

Links
- Journal homepage

Caribbean Herpetology is a peer-reviewed open access scientific journal established in 2010. It covers Caribbean herpetology, including evolution, ecology, ethology, biogeography, systematics, and natural history. The editor-in-chief is S. Blair Hedges (Temple University). The journal is abstracted and indexed in BIOSIS Previews and The Zoological Record.
