= Russian Journal of Nematology =

- Discipline: Nematology
- Language: English
- Edited by: Roland Perry; Sergei Subbotin; Sergei Spiridonov

Publication details
- History: 1993–present
- Publisher: Russian Society of Nematologists
- Frequency: Biannual
- Impact factor: 0.57 (2014)

Standard abbreviations
- ISO 4: Russ. J. Nematol.

Indexing
- ISSN: 0869-6918
- OCLC no.: 33215621

Links
- Journal homepage; Online access

The Russian Journal of Nematology (Russian: Российский нематологический журнал, romanized: Rossiyskiy nematologicheskiy zhurnal) is a peer-reviewed scientific journal covering all aspects of studying nematodes. It was established in 1993 and is published by the Russian Society of Nematologists. The editors-in-chief are Roland Perry (Rothamsted Research) Sergei Subbotin (California Department of Food and Agriculture) and Sergei Spiridonov (Russian Academy of Sciences).

== Abstracting and indexing ==
The journal is abstracted and indexed in:

- Science Citation Index
- Current Contents/Agriculture, Biology & Environmental Sciences
- CAB Direct
- Scopus
- The Zoological Record
- BIOSIS Previews
- Biological Abstracts
- SCImago Journal Rank
- Russian Science Citation Index
- ESI
