= Protostictinae =

Scientific classification
- Kingdom: Animalia
- Phylum: Arthropoda
- Clade: Pancrustacea
- Class: Insecta
- Order: Odonata
- Suborder: Zygoptera
- Family: Platystictidae
- Subfamily: Protostictinae; Dijkstra, Kalkman, Dow, Stokvis & van Tol, 2014

Genera
- Drepanosticta; Protosticta; Sulcosticta; Telosticta

Subfamily of damselflies

Protostictinae is a subfamily of damselflies in the family Platystictidae, comprising four genera.
