= Journal of Zoology =

Scientific journal

- Discipline: Zoology
- Language: English
- Edited by: Nigel Bennett

Publication details
- Former names: Proceedings of the Zoological Society of London, Journal of Zoology: Proceedings of the Zoological Society of London
- History: 1830–present
- Publisher: Wiley-Blackwell for the Zoological Society of London (England)
- Frequency: Monthly
- Impact factor: 2.322 (2020)

Standard abbreviations
- ISO 4: J. Zool.

Indexing
- CODEN: JOZOEU
- ISSN: 0952-8369 (print); 1469-7998 (web)
- OCLC no.: 15264754

Links
- Journal homepage

The Journal of Zoology is a scientific journal concerning zoology, the study of animals. It was founded in 1830 by the Zoological Society of London and is published by Wiley-Blackwell. It carries original research papers, which are targeted towards general readers. Some of the articles are available via open access, depending on the author's wishes. According to the Journal Citation Reports, the journal has a 2020 impact factor of 2.322, ranking it 36th out of 175 journals in the category "Zoology".

From around 1833, it was known as the Proceedings of the Zoological Society of London (ISSN 0370-2774). From 1965 to 1984, it was known as the Journal of Zoology: Proceedings of the Zoological Society of London (ISSN 0022-5460).

== See also ==
- List of zoology journals
