= Current Zoology =

Academic journal

- Discipline: Zoology
- Language: English
- Edited by: Ya-Ping Zhang

Publication details
- Former name: Acta Zoologica Sinica
- History: 1935–present
- Publisher: Oxford University Press
- Frequency: Bimonthly
- Open access: Yes
- Impact factor: 2.624 (2020)

Standard abbreviations
- ISO 4: Curr. Zool.

Indexing
- ISSN: 1674-5507 (print); 2396-9814 (web)
- OCLC no.: 1073633355

Links
- Journal homepage; Online archive

Current Zoology is a bimonthly peer-reviewed open access scientific journal of zoology. It was established in 1935 as Acta Zoologica Sinica, obtaining its current name in 2009. It is published by Oxford University Press and sponsored by both the Institute of Zoology, Chinese Academy of Sciences and the China Zoological Society. The editor-in-chief is Ya-Ping Zhang (Kunming Institute of Zoology). According to the Journal Citation Reports, the journal has a 2020 impact factor of 2.624, ranking it 25th out of 175 journals in the category "Zoology".
