= Acta Zoológica Mexicana =

- Discipline: Zoology
- Language: English, French, Portuguese, Spanish
- Edited by: Sergio Ibáñez Bernal

Publication details
- History: original series [1955-1971 (ceased, vol. 10, no.4), new series (1984 - present)
- Publisher: Instituto de Ecologia (Mexico)
- Frequency: Triannual
- Open access: since 1994

Standard abbreviations
- ISO 4: Acta Zool. Mex.

Indexing
- CODEN: AZMEEF
- ISSN: 0065-1737
- OCLC no.: 1461038

Links
- Journal homepage

Acta Zoológica Mexicana is a Mexican peer-reviewed scientific journal in the field of terrestrial zoology.

It was established in July 1955 by the Escuela Nacional de Ciencias Biológicas del Instituto Politécnico Nacional (National School of Biological Sciences, National Polytechnic Institute), and taken over in 1966 by the Museo de Historia Natural de la Ciudad de México (Natural History Museum in Mexico City), which published it from 1966 to 1971, the last issue being volume 10, number 4. It was not published from 1971 through 1983. In 1984, a new series (nueva serie) was started by the Ecological Institute of Mexico (Instituto de Ecología).

The new series was published irregularly and instead of collated volumes was simply sequentially numbered, with 90 issues through December 2003. Beginning with the April 2004 issue, volume 20, number 1, it was again collated into volumes, and placed on a regular schedule of three issues a year.

Acta Zoológica Mexicana is indexed in Biological Abstracts and The Zoological Record.
