= Banham Zoo =

Banham Zoological Gardens
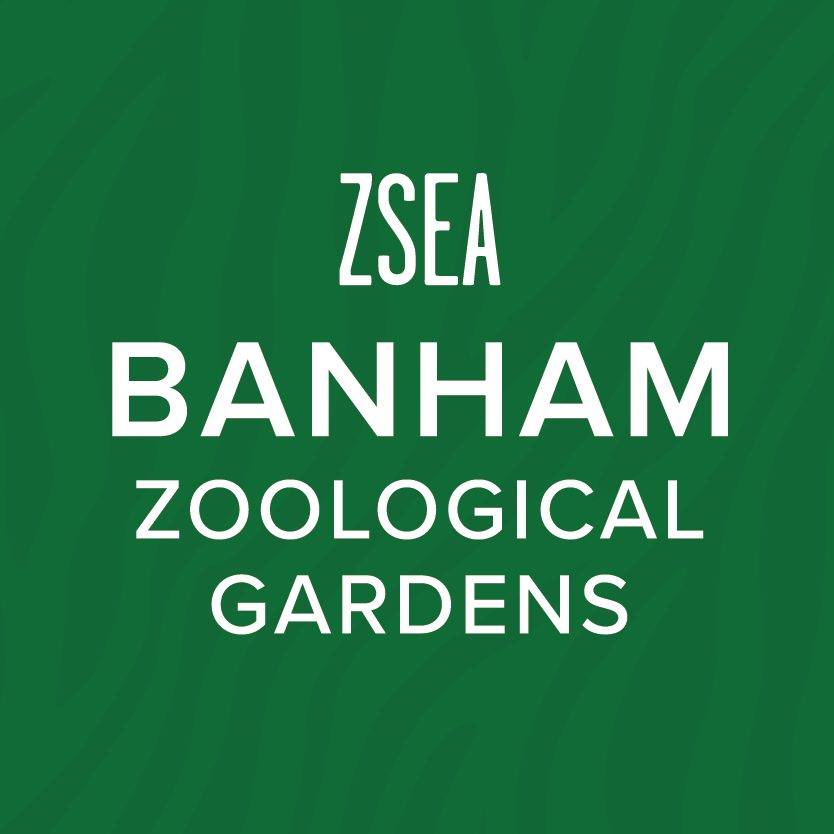
- ZSEA Banham Zoological Gardens Green Logo
- Interactive map of Banham Zoological Gardens
- 52°26′41″N 1°1′30″E
- Date opened: 1968
- Location: Banham, Norfolk, England
- Land area: 50 acres (20 ha)
- No. of animals: 2000+
- No. of species: 100
- Annual visitors: 200,000
- Memberships: BIAZA, EAZA, WAZA
- Website: www.banhamzoo.co.uk

Banham Zoological Gardens is a 50-acre (20 ha) zoo in Banham, Norfolk, England. The zoo, which in 2024 was reported to be a home to more than 2,000 animals, opened to the public in 1968, became a charity in 2013, and has since been often awarded the prize of Norfolk's Top Attraction, by numerous different organisations, with an annual visitor attendance of in excess of 200,000 people. It is part of the Zoological Society of East Anglia, a registered charity which also owns Africa Alive Zoological Reserve near Lowestoft, Suffolk.

== History ==
Banham Zoo began as a collection of pheasants and parrots, and opened to the public in 1968. In 1971, it acquired a colony of Woolly Monkeys and became 'Banham Zoo and Woolly Monkey Sanctuary'. Banham Zoological Gardens became the first collection in the UK to breed the silvery woolly monkey. In 1974, Banham Zoological Gardens was accepted as a member of the Federation of British Zoos. Today, it has acquired a much larger collection of animals, but it still retains one of the best collections of smaller monkeys in Europe

== Animals ==
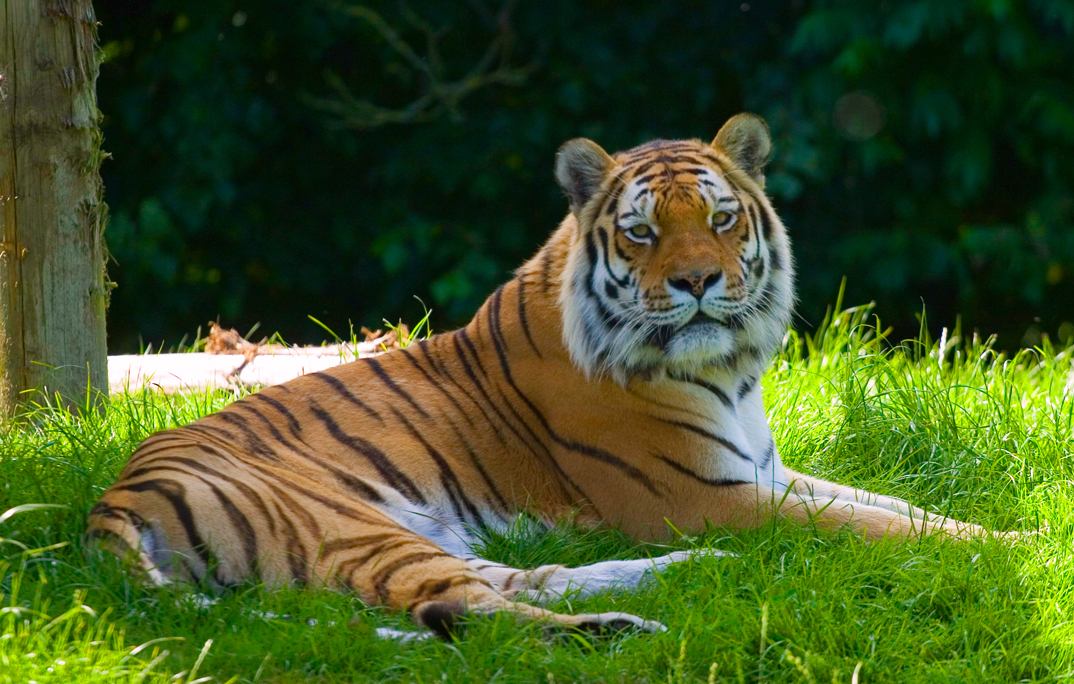
Siberian tiger

Birds housed at the zoo include Hooded vultures, Laughing kookaburras, Verreaux's eagle-owls, Barn owls, Great grey owls, Blue-and-yellow macaws, Galahs, Red-legged seriemas, a White-cheeked turaco, a Laggar falcon, Harris's hawks, Northern white-faced owls, a Common kestrel, Spectacled owls, Moreporks, Rufous-legged owls, Helmeted curassows, a Sulphur-crested cockatoo, Solomons cockatoos, White-backed vultures, Rüppell's vultures, Red-crested turacos, Sun conures, Rainbow lorikeets, Common emerald doves, Snowy owls, Emus, African spoonbills, Giant wood rails, Scarlet ibises, Striated caracaras, Victoria crown pigeons and Bali mynas.

Primates kept at the zoo include siamangs, black-headed spider monkeys, black howler monkeys, black-and-white ruffed lemurs, Goeldi's monkeys, Geoffroy's marmosets, ring-tailed lemurs, pied tamarins, golden lion tamarins, golden-headed lion tamarins, blue-eyed black lemurs, western lesser bamboo lemurs, red-bellied lemurs, pygmy marmosets, silvery marmosets, geladas, white-faced sakis, cotton-top tamarins, and emperor tamarins.

Other mammals at the zoo include margays, red kangaroos, giraffes, rhinoceroses, Sri Lankan leopards, black-tailed prairie dogs, Asian small-clawed otters, red pandas, meerkats, sitatungas, yaks, wildebeests, elks, zebras, saola, gazelles, maned wolves, Amur tigers, cheetahs, snow leopards, California sea lions, Linnaeus's two-toed sloths, southern pudus, kunekune pigs, Cameroon sheep, alpacas and llamas.

Reptiles and invertebrates at the zoo include Cuvier's dwarf caimans, red-footed tortoises, Amazon Basin emerald tree boas, ball pythons and curlyhair tarantulas.

In 2023, the Banham Zoo announced its plans to expand its native species breeding and wildlife programs over the next seven years.

== Exhibits ==
The Province of the Snow Cat is an exhibit that opened in the year 2009 for the zoo's breeding pair of snow leopards. It features rock-faces and a meandering stream. Three cubs were born here in 2010.

The Giraffe House was built and opened as a celebration of the zoo's 40th anniversary. Since its opening in 2008, there have been several successful giraffe births.

The Bird Garden is a short walk on a meandering path. It features several aviaries with other enclosures opposite. These feature different birds and smaller monkeys respectively. Such species include Bali starlings, Geoffroy's marmosets, cotton-top tamarins, and golden-headed lion tamarins.

== Notes ==
- Media related to Banham Zoo at Wikimedia Commons
