= Acta Zoologica Bulgarica =

- Discipline: Zoology, taxonomy, ecology
- Language: English
- Edited by: Boyko B. Georgiev

Publication details
- History: 1949–present
- Publisher: Institute of Biodiversity and Ecosystem Research, Bulgarian Academy of Sciences (Bulgaria)
- Frequency: Quarterly
- Impact factor: 0.532 (2014)

Standard abbreviations
- ISO 4: Acta Zool. Bulg.

Indexing
- ISSN: 0324-0770 (print); 2603-3798 (web)
- OCLC no.: 183335844

Links
- Journal homepage

Acta Zoologica Bulgarica is a peer-reviewed scientific journal publishing original research studies in the fields of animal taxonomy, biogeography and ecology. The journal provides online access to abstracts since 2005 and to articles since 2011. Most articles focus on the Bulgarian and Balkan fauna but articles from other geographical areas are also published.

Acta Zoologica Bulgarica has also a supplement series (7 supplement have been published till 2014).

The journal is abstracted and indexed in Science Citation Index, Journal Citation Reports (impact factor for 2013 is 0.357), Biological Abstracts, BIOSIS Previews, Scopus and Zoological Record.
