= Integrative and Comparative Biology =

- Discipline: Biology; Zoology
- Language: English

Publication details
- History: American Zoologist 1961 - 2002; ICB 2002 - present
- Publisher: Oxford University Press for the Society for Integrative and Comparative Biology (United Kingdom)
- Frequency: Bimonthly (Monthly throughout 2007)
- Open access: No
- Impact factor: 2.149

Standard abbreviations
- ISO 4: Integr. Comp. Biol.

Indexing
- ISSN: 1557-7023

Links
- Journal homepage; Current issue; American Zoologist at BioOne

Integrative and Comparative Biology is the scientific journal for the Society for Integrative and Comparative Biology (formerly the American Society of Zoologists). Prior to volume 42 (2002), the journal was known as American Zoologist ISSN 0003-1569.

== See also ==
- List of zoology journals
