= Acta Zoologica Academiae Scientiarum Hungaricae =

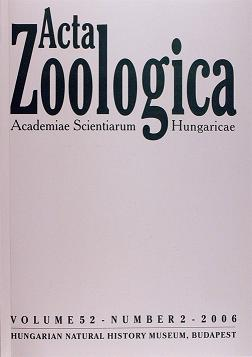
- Discipline: Zoology, taxonomy, ecology
- Language: English
- Edited by: Gábor Bakonyi

Publication details
- Former name: Acta Zoologica Hungarica
- History: 1954–present
- Publisher: Hungarian Natural History Museum and the Hungarian Academy of Sciences (Hungary)
- Frequency: Quarterly
- Open access: yes
- Impact factor: 0.923 (2020)

Standard abbreviations
- ISO 4: Acta Zool. Acad. Sci. Hung.

Indexing
- ISSN: 2064-2474
- OCLC no.: 30598589

Links
- Journal homepage

Acta Zoologica Academiae Scientiarum Hungaricae is a peer-reviewed, open access scientific journal no-publication fee, publishing original research studies in the fields of animal taxonomy, systematics, biogeography, and ecology. It was established in 1954 under the title Acta Zoologica Hungarica (1984–1993).

It is indexed in the Journal Citation Reports. The journal is also indexed in BIOSIS, Biological Abstracts, Abstracts of Entomology, CAB Abstracts, Forest Science Database, Current Contents, Human Genome Abstracts, Science Citation Index, and The Zoological Record.

== See also ==
- Open access in Hungary
