= Acta Zoologica =

- Discipline: Zoology
- Language: English
- Edited by: Lennart Olsson

Publication details
- Former name: Zoon
- History: 1920–present
- Publisher: Wiley-Blackwell on behalf of the Royal Swedish Academy of Sciences and the Royal Danish Academy of Sciences and Letters
- Frequency: Quarterly
- Open access: Hybrid
- Impact factor: 1.261 (2020)

Standard abbreviations
- ISO 4: Acta Zool.

Indexing
- CODEN: AZOSAT
- ISSN: 0001-7272 (print); 1463-6395 (web)
- LCCN: 58035899
- OCLC no.: 1461033

Links
- Journal homepage; Online access; Online archive

Acta Zoologica is a peer-reviewed scientific journal published by Wiley-Blackwell on behalf of the Royal Swedish Academy of Sciences and the Royal Danish Academy of Sciences and Letters. It is one of the world's leading zoological journals and focuses on animal development, structure, and function, including physiological organization. It primarily publishes original research papers, but occasionally also publishes review articles.

Increasingly, it has concentrated on animal development, with emphasis on the functional, comparative, and phylogenetic aspects. The editor-in-chief is Lennart Olsson (University of Jena).

== History ==
The journal was established in 1920 with Nils Holmgren serving as the first editor.

In 1980, the journal absorbed Zoon : a journal of zoology which ran 1973–1979 and was a continuation of the publication Zoologiska Bidrag från Uppsala (1911–1972).

== Abstracting and indexing ==
The journal is abstracted and indexed in:

- Academic Search
- Animal Breeding Abstracts
- Aquatic Sciences and Fisheries Abstracts
- Elsevier BIOBASE
- Biological Abstracts
- BIOSIS Previews
- CAB Abstracts
- CAB Health
- CABDirect
- Chemical Abstracts Service
- Animal Behavior Abstracts
- Current Contents/Agriculture, Biology & Environmental Sciences
- EMBASE
- Index Veterinarius
- InfoTrac
- ProQuest databases
- Science Citation Index
- Scopus
- Tropical Diseases Bulletin
- Veterinary Bulletin
- VINITI Database RAS
- The Zoological Record

According to the Journal Citation Reports, the journal has a 2020 impact factor of 1.261, ranking it 15th out of 21 journals in the category "Anatomy & Morphology" and 105th out of 174 journals in the category "Zoology"

== See also ==
- List of zoology journals
