= The Raffles Bulletin of Zoology =

Singaporean academic journal

- Discipline: Zoology
- Language: English

Publication details
- Former names: Bulletin of the Raffles Museum, Bulletin of the National Museum of Singapore
- History: 1928–present
- Publisher: Lee Kong Chian Natural History Museum, National University of Singapore (Singapore)
- Frequency: Annually
- Open access: Yes

Standard abbreviations
- ISO 4: Raffles Bull. Zool.

Indexing
- ISSN: 0217-2445 (print); 2345-7600 (web)

Links
- Journal homepage

The Raffles Bulletin of Zoology is a peer-reviewed open-access scientific journal published by the Lee Kong Chian Natural History Museum at the National University of Singapore.

== Overview ==
It covers the taxonomy, ecology, and conservation of Southeast Asian fauna. Supplements are published as and when funding permits and may cover topics that extend beyond the normal scope of the journal depending on the targets of the funding agency. It was established as the Bulletin of the Raffles Museum in 1928 and renamed Bulletin of the National Museum of Singapore in 1961, before obtaining its current title in 1971.

== See also ==
- List of zoology journals
