= Frontiers in Zoology =

- Discipline: Zoology
- Language: English
- Edited by: Jürgen Heinze, Ulrich Technau

Publication details
- History: 2004–present
- Publisher: BioMed Central
- Frequency: Upon acceptance
- Open access: Yes
- License: Creative Commons Attribution 2.0
- Impact factor: 2.781 (2016)

Standard abbreviations
- ISO 4: Front. Zool.

Indexing
- CODEN: FZROAJ
- ISSN: 1742-9994
- LCCN: 2004243836
- OCLC no.: 810434771

Links
- Journal homepage; Online access

Frontiers in Zoology is a peer-reviewed open access scientific journal covering all aspects of zoology. It was established in 2004 and is published by BioMed Central on behalf of the German Zoological Society. The editors-in-chief are Jürgen Heinze (University of Regensburg) and Ulrich Technau (University of Vienna).

== Abstracting and indexing ==
The journal is abstracted and indexed in:

- Biological Abstracts
- BIOSIS Previews
- Chemical Abstracts Service
- Current Contents/Agriculture, Biology & Environmental Sciences
- Science Citation Index Expanded
- Scopus
- The Zoological Record

According to the Journal Citation Reports, the journal has a 2016 impact factor of 2.781.
