= Africa Alive =

Africa Alive Zoological Reserve
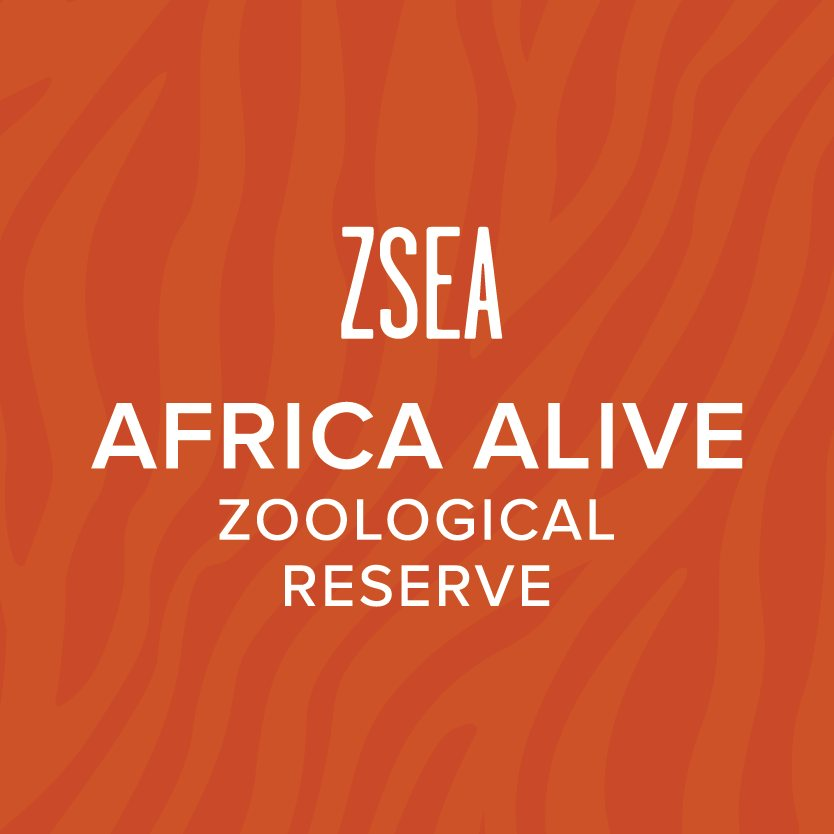
- SEA Africa Alive Zoological Reserve Orange Logo
- Interactive map of Africa Alive Zoological Reserve
- 52°25′7.5″N 1°42′19″E
- Location: Kessingland, Suffolk, UK
- Land area: 80 acres (32 ha)
- Memberships: WAZA, EAZA, BIAZA
- Major exhibits: Plains of Africa, Farmyard
- Website: www.africa-alive.co.uk

Africa Alive Zoological Reserve, formerly known as Africa Alive! and Suffolk Wildlife Park, is a zoo located in Kessingland, Suffolk, UK. It is situated off the A12 at Kessingland 2 miles (3 km) south of Lowestoft.

Africa Alive Zoological Reserve is part of the Zoological Society of East Anglia, a registered charity, and a member of the World Association of Zoos and Aquariums (WAZA), the European Association of Zoos and Aquaria (EAZA), and the British and Irish Association of Zoos and Aquariums (BIAZA).

== History ==
Suffolk Wildlife Park was acquired by Banham Zoo in 1991 with the idea of creating an animal park hosting some animals bred in their zoo, without having to transfer them long distances. The theme of `animals from the African continent' was decided upon when the park was created. On Tuesday 21 March 2006, the Park officially rebranded as Africa Alive! Africa Alive! along with Banham Zoo became a charity in 2013 under the Zoological Society of East Anglia. In February 2022, a part of the lion enclosure's fence was smashed by a fallen tree during Storm Eunice. The ZSEA launched a fundraiser to meet the costs of the damage, which had reached over £63,000.

== Animals ==
Africa Alive! Zoological Reserve is an African themed zoo, and has the following species:

Primates:

- Mongoose lemur
- Sclater's lemur
- Drill
- Chimpanzee
- King colobus
- Black lemur
- Ring-tailed lemur
- Black-and-white ruffed lemur
- Crowned lemur
- Red-bellied lemur

Other mammals:

- Fossa
- African crested porcupine
- Aardvark
- Meerkat
- Short-clawed otter
- Straw-coloured fruit bat
- Cameroon sheep
- Somali black-headed sheep
- African hunting dog
- Somali wild ass
- Congo buffalo
- African lion
- Barbary sheep
- Southern white rhinoceros
- Cheetah
- Reticulated giraffe
- Blesbok
- Chapman's zebra
- Domestic water buffalo
- Bongo
- Sitatunga
- Lowland nyala
- Nile lechwe
- Kafue Flats lechwe
- Rock hyrax
- African pygmy goat
- Domestic rabbit
- Guinea pig

Birds:

- Greater flamingo
- Grey crowned crane
- Demoiselle crane
- White stork
- Helmeted guineafowl
- White-faced scops owl
- Kenyan eagle owl
- Grey parrot
- Greater vasa parrot
- Milky eagle owl
- Egyptian vulture
- Hamerkop
- Black-masked lovebird
- Superb starling
- Ostrich

Reptiles and invertebrates:

- Royal python
- African land snail
- Madagascan hissing cockroach
- Plated lizard
- Leopard tortoise
- Spur-thighed tortoise
