= Society for Integrative and Comparative Biology =

The Society for Integrative and Comparative Biology is organized to integrate the many fields of specialization which occur in the broad field of biology.

The society was formed in 1902 as the American Society of Zoologists, through the merger of two societies, the "Central Naturalists" and the "American Morphological Society" (founded in 1890). The Ecological Society of America split from it in 1915, and another society of geneticists also split from it in 1930. In 1996 the name was changed to the Society for Integrative and Comparative Biology.

The society publishes two scientific journals: the bimonthly journal Integrative and Comparative Biology (formerly the American Zoologist) and Evolution & Development. It is organized in a flexible structure with many lightweight divisions. As of 2014, it has approximately 3500 members.
