= The Zoological Journal =

- Discipline: Zoology
- Language: English

Publication details
- History: 1824–1834
- Publisher: W. Phillips

Standard abbreviations
- ISO 4: Zool. J.

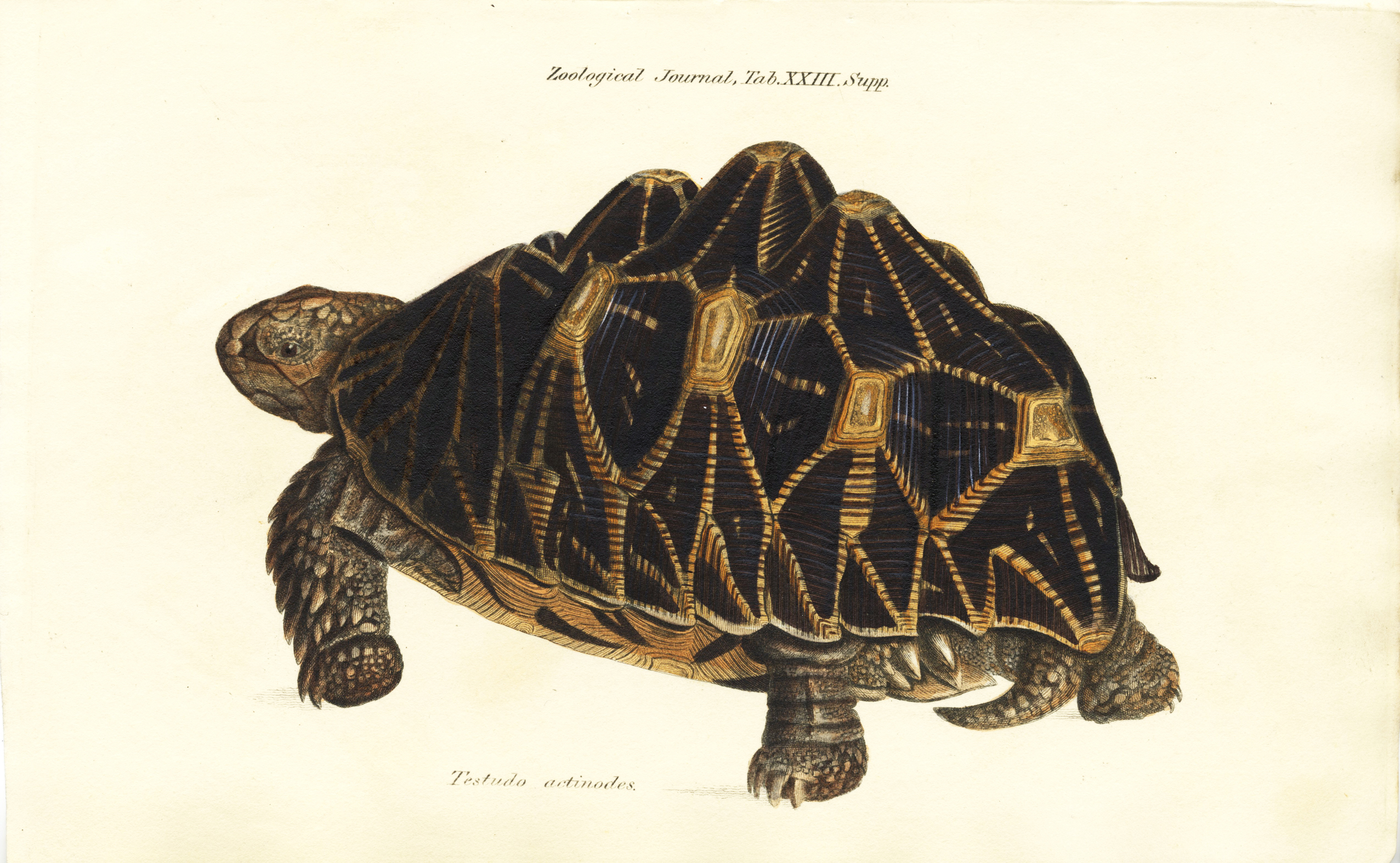
Testudo actinodes (Geochelone elegans) from the Zoological Journal

The Zoological Journal was an early nineteenth century quarterly scientific journal devoted to zoology.

It published "Original Communications, Translations of new and interesting Papers from Foreign sources and notices of new and remarkable facts in any way connected with Zoology".

The Zoological Journal was published in London by W. Phillips. The editors were Thomas Bell, John George Children, James De Carle Sowerby, George Brettingham Sowerby, and (later) Nicholas Aylward Vigors. It was established by a splinter group of the Linnean Society who favoured the Quinarian system and was only short-lived.

Five volumes were published between 1824 and 1834: volume 1 1824-1825, volume 2 1825-1826, volume 3 1827-1828, volume 4 1828-1829, volume 5 1832-1834 (no issues 1830-1831).
