= Zoology (journal) =

- Discipline: Zoology
- Language: English
- Edited by: Christa Beckmann

Publication details
- History: 1886–present
- Publisher: Elsevier
- Frequency: Bimonthly
- Open access: Hybrid
- Impact factor: 2.0 (2022)

Standard abbreviations
- ISO 4: Zoology

Indexing
- CODEN: ZOLGEA
- ISSN: 0944-2006 (print); 1873-2720 (web)
- LCCN: sn94039030
- OCLC no.: 183249157

Links
- Journal homepage; Online archives

Zoology is a bimonthly peer-reviewed scientific journal covering zoology that was established in 1886. It is published by Elsevier and the editor-in-chief is Christa Beckmann (Western Sydney University).

According to the Journal Citation Reports, the journal has a 2022 impact factor of 2.0.

== See also ==
- List of zoology journals
