= Palm Beach Zoo =

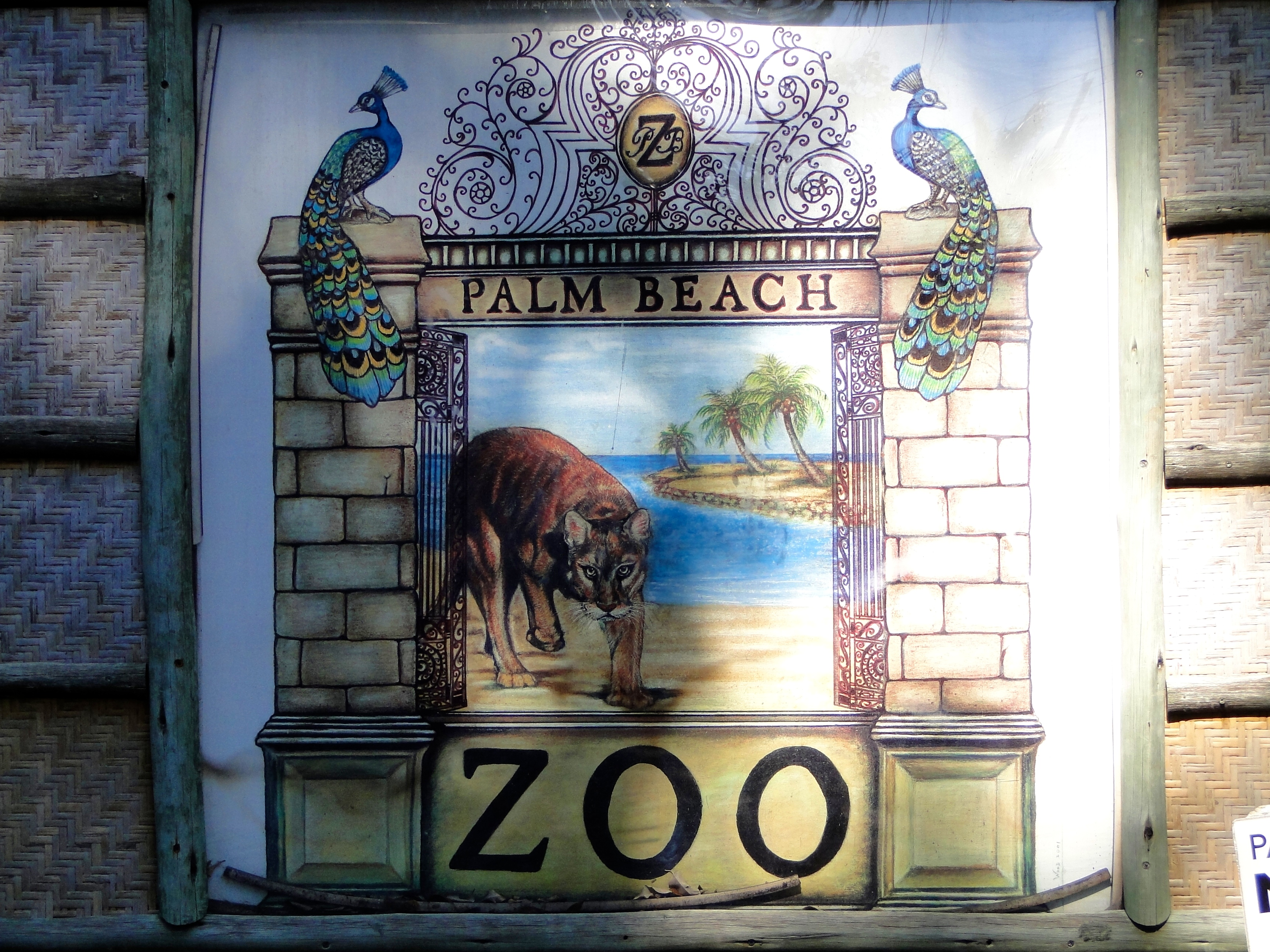
- Interactive map of Palm Beach Zoo
- 26°39′59.06″N 80°4′9.47″W
- Date opened: 1961
- Location: Dreher Park, West Palm Beach, Florida, United States
- Land area: 23 acres (9.3 ha)
- Annual visitors: 380,000
- Memberships: AZA, WAZA
- Website: www.palmbeachzoo.org

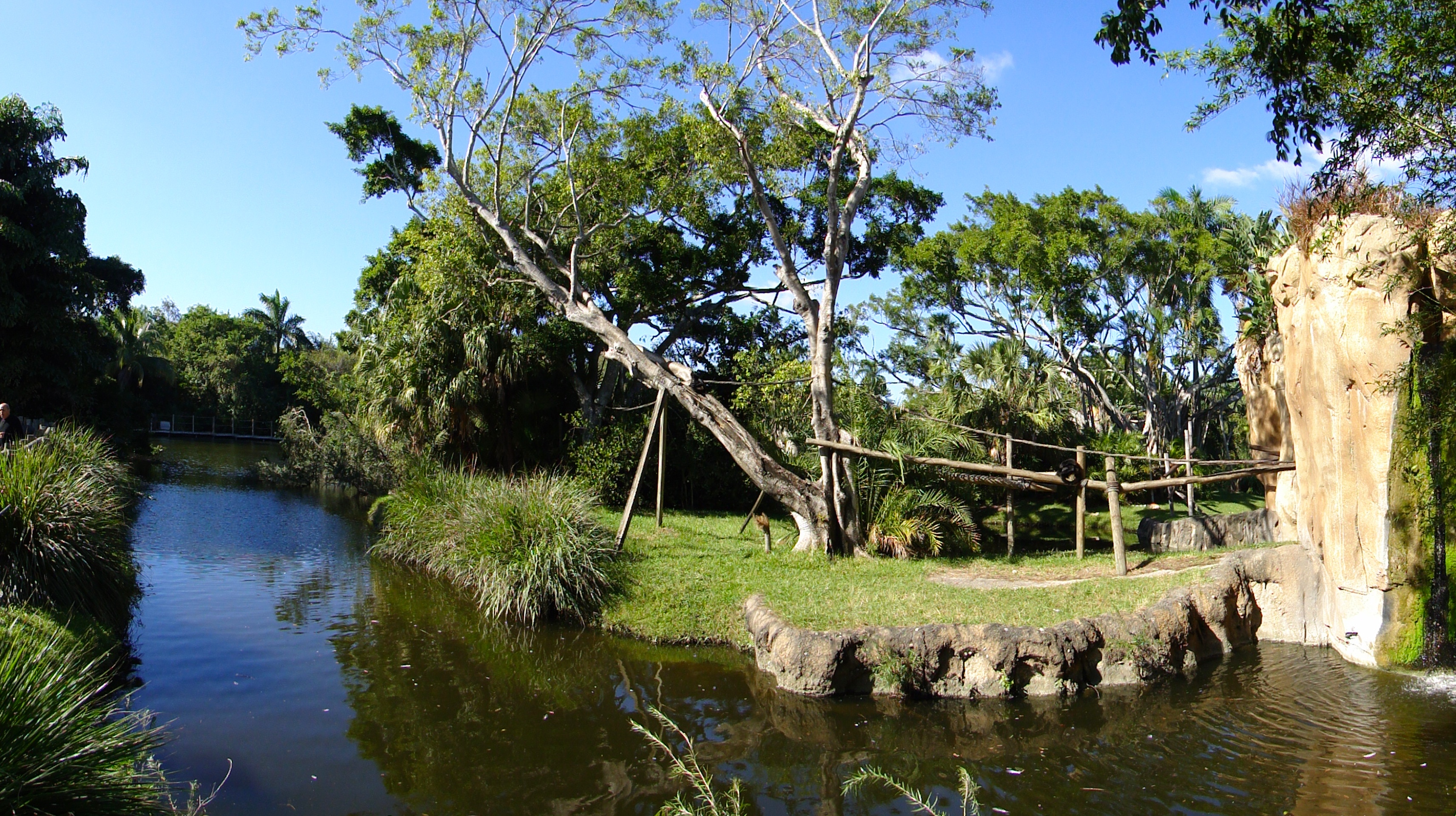

The Palm Beach Zoo is a zoo located at Dreher Park in West Palm Beach Florida. The zoo houses hundreds of animals, many of them endangered, within 23-acres of lush tropical habitat. The Palm Beach Zoo is a member of the Association of Zoos and Aquariums and the World Association of Zoos and Aquariums.

== Exhibits and Animals ==
=== Florida Wetlands ===
The Florida Wetlands showcases a recreation of a cypress swamp and showcases the following:

- American alligator
- American black bear
- American flamingo
- Bald eagle
- Barn owl
- Barred owl
- Black swan
- Florida panther
- Gopher tortoise
- Nene
- North American river otter
- Redhead
- Ruddy duck
- Turkey vulture
- Wood duck

=== Asia ===
The Henry and Charlotte Kimelman Tiger Falls opened in 2000.

On November 8, 2006, Malayan tigers "Mata" and "Rimba" arrived at the zoo from the San Diego Zoo. Malayan tiger "Berapi" came to the zoo in November 2010. Three cubs sired by Rimba were born to Berapi on May 12, 2011. The three tigers "Jaya", "Bunga" and "Penari" were moved to the Jacksonville Zoo on October 28, 2013.

In March 2015, the zoo opened its "Tiger River" habitat, adding an extra exhibit yard to the Henry and Charlotte Kimelman Tiger Habitat. Here, visitors will find:

- Aldabra giant tortoise
- Black howler monkey
- Llama
- Malayan tiger
- Red-crowned crane
- Rhinoceros hornbill
- Southern ground hornbill
- White-tailed deer

=== Harriet W. and George D. Cornell Tropics of the Americas ===
This 18 million-dollar exhibit complex opened in 2004 and features animals and the Mayan culture found in Central and South America. The exhibit is located on a three-acre peninsula in the zoo. Animal Planet featured Tropics of the Americas on the television show "Ultimate Zoo" in 2006. On January 15, 2018, the zoo opened their new ocelot habitat, which was sponsored by a local Palm Beach couple, Carole and John Moran. The new habitat allows for three ocelots to live and roam around. This couple also sponsored the Panther Prowl habitat. The exhibit features two Mayan pyramids that are over 40 feet tall, and a walk-through cave, among other displays and houses animals found in Central and South America such as:

- Axolotl
- Baird's tapir
- Blue-and-yellow macaw
- Broad-snouted caiman
- Capybara
- Chilean flamingo
- Colombian white-faced capuchin
- Common squirrel monkey
- Crested porcupine
- Jaguar
- Giant anteater
- Mexican spider monkey
- Military macaw
- Mute swan
- Ocelot
- Patagonian mara
- Spotted whistling duck
- Tufted capuchin

=== The Islands ===
This section of the zoo showcases different species of animals from islands all over the world including:

- Goeldi's monkey
- Golden lion tamarin
- Hoffmann's two-toed sloth
- Koala
- Red ruffed lemur
- Ring-tailed lemur
- Scarlet macaw
- Serval
- Rainbow lorikeet
- Siamang
- Tawny frogmouth

=== Other amenities ===
- Interactive Play Fountain
- Wildlife Carousel
- Latitude 26 cafe
- Amazon Marketplace & Jungle Traders Gift Shop
- 35+ Keeper Talks & Encounters Per Week
- Bronze Sculpture of "Water Dogs" by Artist Geoffrey C Smith Located near the River Otter Exhibit

== Conservation ==
The Palm Beach Zoo Conservation Society takes part in various conservation programs, including studies, campaigns, projects, and awareness campaigns. The Palm Beach Zoo has partnered with institutions and organizations such as the Southeastern Disease Cooperative at the University of Georgia, the Brookfield Zoo, the Association of Zoos and Aquariums (AZA) Contraception Center, the Florida Wildlife Commission (FWC), the Brevard Zoo, the Santa Fe Teaching Zoo, the US Fish and Wildlife Service, the Florida State Parks Service, the Palm Beach County Marine Mammal Stranding Network, and Madidi National Park. The Palm Beach Zoo is also the first zoo to partner with the Florida Wildlife Corridor.

=== Melvin J. & Claire Levine Animal Care Complex ===
The Palm Beach Zoo is home to the Melvin J. & Claire Levine Animal Care Complex, which serves as the headquarters for the Palm Beach Zoo Conservation Society. The complex has earned Gold Certification for Leadership in Energy and Environmental Design (LEED) by the Green Building Council. The Melvin J. and Claire Levine Animal Care Complex. It also houses the Center for Conservation Medicine.

=== Education ===
The Palm Beach Zoo Education Department is an organization hosting multiple programs to children from ages 3 to 18 to educate and spread awareness to children and adolescents about conservation efforts and their significance. The department provides entertainment to members as well as hands-on experiences with the zoo's attractions as well as the opportunity to partake in active conservation projects. Programs include the Zoo Camp, Overnight Adventures, the Ed Morse ZooMobile, and other opportunities for schools, scout troops, and community groups looking for involvement in the zoo's conservation projects.

=== International Projects ===
In collaboration with Madidi National Park in Bolivia and the Wildlife Conservation Society (WCS), the Palm Beach Zoo provides funding and staff for conservation activities in a protected area of approximately 18,900 kilometers squared. The area protects jaguars, black faced spider monkeys, lowland tapir, giant river otters, Andean bears, Andean condors and other wildlife abound in this remote sector of the Amazon. New Species are still being discovered to this day. The region is also home to eleven indigenous groups that are also contributing to the preservation of the area and its wildlife.

The Palm Beach Zoo also supports the Wildlife Conservation Society in its projects to strengthen anti-poaching laws in Malaysia in order to protect tigers and their habitats. These species are considered critically endangered. The Palm Beach zoo also provides education and activities about these tigers in areas local to their habitats. The Palm Beach Zoo provides information on their site on how others can contribute to tiger conservation in Malaysia.

== Hours ==
Sunday	9:00 am–5:00 pm
Monday	9:00 am–5:00 pm
Tuesday	9:00 am–5:00 pm
Wednesday	9:00 am–5:00 pm
Thursday	9:00 am–5:00 pm
Friday	9:00 am–5:00 pm
Saturday	9:00 am–5:00 pm

Last Admission at 4:15 pm.

Closed on Thanksgiving and Christmas Days.

== Incidents and controversies ==
=== Worker killed by tiger ===
On April 15, 2016, lead zookeeper Stacey Konwiser was mauled by a Malayan tiger while preparing the animal for a presentation called "Tiger Talk." Konwiser, who had been working for the Palm Beach Zoo for three years, had been doing routine work alone in the tiger enclosure when the animal attacked. To reach Konwiser, staff needed to tranquilize the tiger, as it had been guarding her body like prey. Konwiser was then brought to St. Mary's Medical Center, where she was later pronounced dead. Zoo officials later stated that Konwiser had been covering for another staff member who had called in sick. It was also reported that zookeepers were not supposed to enter the enclosure without another keeper present. The zoo went against killing the tiger after the incident and instead tranquilized the animal at the scene.

=== Shotguns stolen from critical response team ===
In April 2018, 2 modified shotguns belonging to the zoo's "critical response team" were removed from a safe. It was reported that someone had broken in and stolen the guns overnight. Head of Communications & Public Relations for Palm Beach Zoo, Naki Carter, had no comment when asked whether this was an "inside job" or not. Despite a reward offering for the return of the weapons, the guns have not been found to this day.

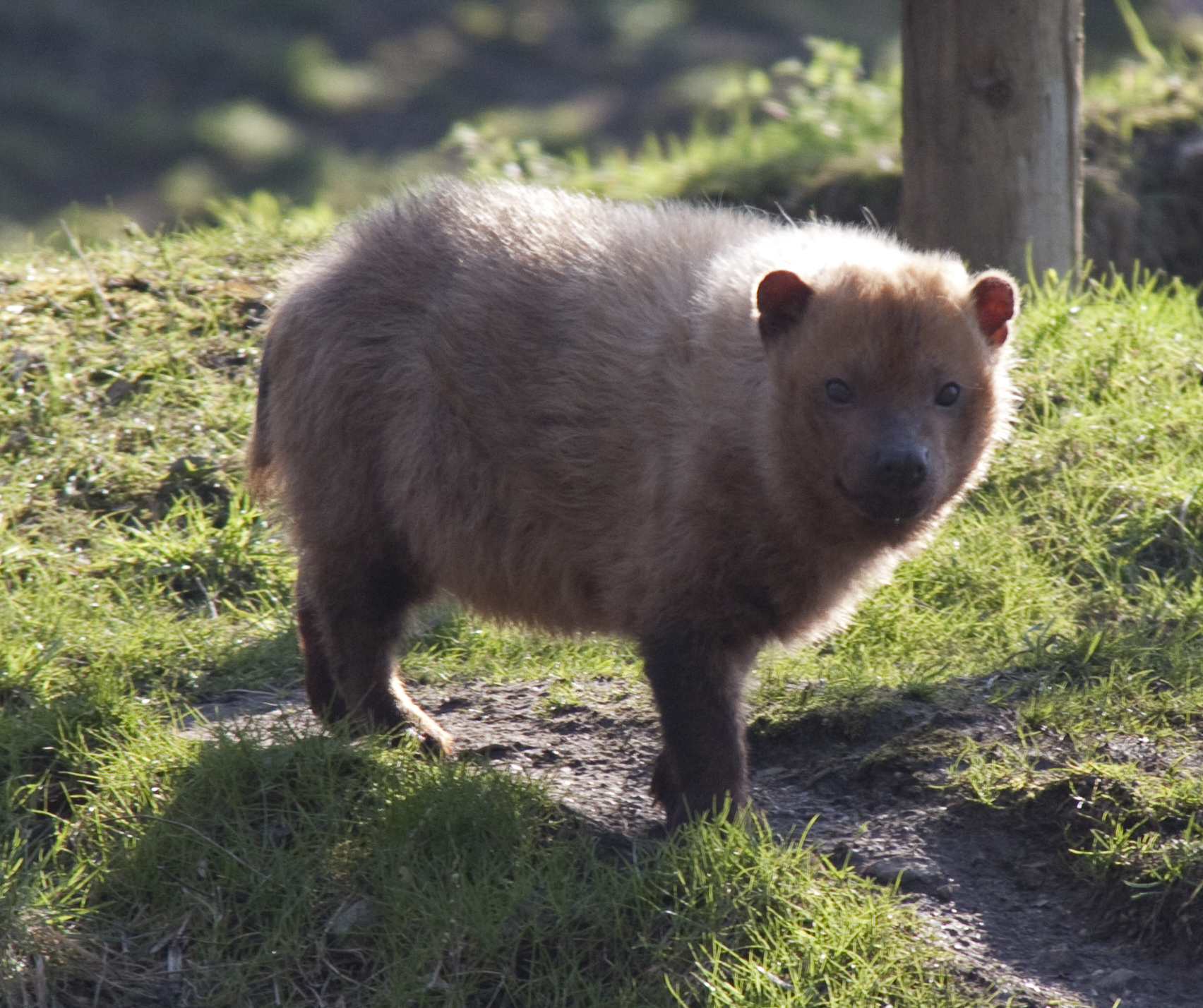
Bush Dog (Speothos venaticus)

=== Flood kills two bush dogs ===
In October 2017, two bush dogs were killed after a zookeeper forgot to turn off the water that fills the pool in their habitat. The two animals, Lilly and Carino, were presumed dead after the entire zoo was searched, and were not found. It is said that Lily and Carino were likely burrowed underground, where they sleep, at the time of the accident. Head of Communications & Public Relations for Palm Beach Zoo, Naki Carter, stated that the zoo has now made modifications to the habitat, including an overflow drain and new security features to the waterline.
