= Journal of Zoological Systematics and Evolutionary Research =

Quarterly, peer reviewed, scientific journal

- Discipline: Zoology, evolutionary biology
- Language: English

Publication details
- Former name: Zeitschrift für zoologische Systematik und Evolutionsforschung
- History: 1963-present
- Publisher: Wiley-VCH/Hindawi
- Frequency: Quarterly
- Open access: Yes
- License: CC BY
- Impact factor: 1.9 (2022)

Standard abbreviations
- ISO 4: J. Zool. Syst. Evol. Res.

Indexing
- ISSN: 0947-5745 (print); 1439-0469 (web)
- LCCN: 95652062
- OCLC no.: 45232394

Links
- Journal homepage; Online access; Online archive

The Journal of Zoological Systematics and Evolutionary Research is a peer-reviewed scientific journal published by Wiley-VCH in collaboration with Hindawi. It covers the systematic study of animal sciences, connected with evolutionary research. The journal was established in 1963 as the Zeitschrift für zoologische Systematik und Evolutionsforschung and published by Akademische Verlagsgesellschaft. It obtained its current title in 1994 when it was moved to Wiley-VCH.

== Abstracting and indexing ==
The journal is abstracted and indexed in:

- Biological Abstracts
- BIOSIS Previews
- CAB Abstracts
- Current Contents/Agriculture, Biology & Environmental Sciences
- Directory of Open Access Journals
- EBSCO databases
- GEOBASE
- ProQuest databases
- Science Citation Index Expanded
- Scopus
- The Zoological Record

According to the Journal Citation Reports, the journal has a 2022 impact factor of 1.9.
