= Zoo Biology =

- Discipline: Zoology, veterinary medicine
- Language: English
- Edited by: Bethany L. Krebs

Publication details
- History: 1982-present
- Publisher: Wiley-Liss
- Frequency: Bimonthly
- Impact factor: 1.421 (2020)

Standard abbreviations
- ISO 4: Zoo Biol.

Indexing
- CODEN: ZOBIDX
- ISSN: 0733-3188 (print); 1098-2361 (web)
- LCCN: 83640984
- OCLC no.: 08563882

Links
- Journal homepage; Online access; Online archive

Zoo Biology is a peer-reviewed scientific journal "concerned with reproduction, demographics, genetics, behavior, medicine, husbandry, nutrition, conservation and all empirical aspects of the exhibition and maintenance of wild animals in wildlife parks, zoos, and aquariums." It is published by Wiley-Liss. The executive editor is Bethany L. Krebs (San Francisco Zoological Society).

According to the Journal Citation Reports, the journal has a 2020 impact factor of 1.421, ranking it 79th out of 146 journals in the category "Veterinary Sciences" and 91st out of 175 journals in the category "Zoology".
