= Journal of Applied Ichthyology =

Scientific journal

- Discipline: Ichthyology, marine biology, oceanography
- Language: English
- Edited by: Christian Wolter

Publication details
- Publisher: Wiley-Blackwell
- Frequency: Bimonthly
- Impact factor: 0.892 (2020)

Standard abbreviations
- ISO 4: J. Appl. Ichthyol.

Indexing
- ISSN: 0175-8659 (print); 1439-0426 (web)
- OCLC no.: 1087250414

Links
- Journal homepage; Issue archive

The Journal of Applied Ichthyology is a peer-reviewed scientific journal on ichthyology, marine biology, and oceanography published by Wiley-Blackwell. It is the official journal of the World Sturgeon Conservation Society and of the Deutsche Wissenschaftliche Kommission für Meeresforschung ("German Scientific Commission for the Exploration of the Sea"). The editor-in-chief is Christian Wolter.

The Journal of Applied Ichthyology was established as a separate journal in 1985, but merged with the Archive of Fishery and Marine Research in 2005. The latter journal had been established as Berichte der Deutschen Wissenschaftlichen Kommission für Meeresforschung, published from before World War I (with a hiatus for the war) until volume 24 in 1975–1976. It was then renamed to Meeresforschung: Reports on Marine Research (ISSN 0341-6836, OCLC 4048873) and was published by Paul Parey Verlag in Hamburg from 1976 until 1991, when the last volume (nr. 33) appeared in print. From 1994 (nr. 42) until 2005 it was published as the Archive of Fishery and Marine Research (Archiv für Fischerei- und Meeresforschung; ISSN 0944-1921).
