= Journal of Experimental Zoology =

- Discipline: Zoology
- Language: English
- Edited by: Günter P. Wagner

Publication details
- History: 1904–present
- Publisher: Wiley-Blackwell
- Frequency: 10/year (A); 8/year (B)
- Impact factor: 2.553 (A); 2.656 (B) (2021)

Standard abbreviations
- ISO 4: J. Exp. Zool.

Indexing
- J. Exp. Zool. A
- ISSN: 1932-5223 (print); 1932-5231 (web)
- J. Exp. Zool. B
- ISSN: 1552-5007 (print); 1552-5015 (web)

Links
- J. Exp. Zool. A website; J. Exp. Zool. B website

Journal of Experimental Zoology is a peer-reviewed scientific journal of zoology established in 1904 by Ross Granville Harrison, Merkel H. Jacobs, and others. For its first four years it was printed in Baltimore by Williams and Wilkins. In 1908, the journal began to be published by the Wistar Institute. The Wistar Institute sold its publishing operations in 1979. The new publisher was Alan R. Liss Inc. Wiley acquired Liss in 1989 and continues to publish the journal today.

In 2003, the journal was split into the Journal of Experimental Zoology Part A: Ecological Genetics and Physiology, currently edited by Randy Nelson and the Journal of Experimental Zoology Part B: Molecular and Developmental Evolution, currently edited by Ehab Abouheif. Both parts are currently published by Wiley-Blackwell. Originally, part A was called Comparative Experimental Biology until 2007 when it changed to Ecological Genetics and Physiology, but it is now titled Ecological and Integrative Physiology. Part B has kept the name it took during the split, Molecular and Developmental Evolution.
