= Zoological Journal of the Linnean Society =

- Discipline: Zoology
- Language: English
- Edited by: Maarten Christenhusz

Publication details
- Former name(s): Journal of the Linnean Society of London, Zoology; Journal of the Proceedings of the Linnean Society of London. Zoology
- History: 1856—present
- Publisher: Oxford University Press on behalf of The Linnean Society of London
- Frequency: Monthly
- Impact factor: 3.286 (2020)

Standard abbreviations
- ISO 4: Zool. J. Linn. Soc.

Indexing
- CODEN: ZJLSA7
- ISSN: 0024-4082 (print); 1096-3642 (web)
- LCCN: 75645095
- OCLC no.: 36953454

Links
- Journal homepage; Online archive

The Zoological Journal of the Linnean Society is a monthly peer-reviewed scientific journal covering zoology published by Oxford University Press on behalf of the Linnean Society. The editor-in-chief is Maarten Christenhusz (Linnean Society). It was established in 1856 as the Journal of the Proceedings of the Linnean Society of London. Zoology and renamed Journal of the Linnean Society of London, Zoology in 1866. It obtained its current title in 1969.

== Abstracting and indexing ==
The journal is abstracted and indexed in:

- Aquatic Sciences & Fisheries Abstracts
- Biological Abstracts
- BIOSIS Previews
- CAB Abstracts
- EBSCO databases
- Current Contents/Agriculture, Biology & Environmental Sciences
- GeoRef
- Global Health
- InfoTrac
- ProQuest databases
- Science Citation Index
- Scopus
- VINITI Database RAS
- The Zoological Record

According to the Journal Citation Reports, the journal has a 2020 impact factor of 3.286.
