= Contributions to Zoology =

- Discipline: Zoology, Paleontology
- Language: English
- Edited by: Ronald Vonk, Naturalis Biodiversity Center

Publication details
- Former name: Bijdragen tot de Dierkunde
- History: 1848-present
- Publisher: Brill publishers, Leiden (The Netherlands)
- Open access: Yes, since 1997
- License: Creative Commons Attribution 3.0
- Impact factor: 2.139 (2018)

Standard abbreviations
- ISO 4: Contrib. Zool.

Indexing
- ISSN: 0067-8546 (print); 1875-9866 (web)

Links
- Journal homepage

Contributions to Zoology (formerly known as Bijdragen tot de Dierkunde) is a scientific journal that started in 1848 as a publication of the Committee in charge of the library of the Dutch Royal Zoological Society "Natura Artis Magistra" and became integrated in the library of the University of Amsterdam in 1939. Since 2019 the journal is published by Brill publishers, Leiden. The journal has been freely available online since 1997. The current editor-in-chief is Ronald Vonk from Naturalis Biodiversity Center, Leiden.

Contributions to Zoology solicits high-quality papers in all systematics-related branches of comparative zoology (including paleozoology). Preference is given to manuscripts dealing with conceptual issues and to integrative papers (e.g., ecology and biodiversity, morphology and phylogeny and character state evolution, phylogeny and historical biogeography, systematics and bioinformatics, bioinformatics and biodiversity, habitat disturbance and biogeography, etc.). Reviews and alpha-taxonomic contributions are considered for publication, but acceptance will depend on their high quality and exceptional nature.

== Abstracting and Indexing ==
The journal is currently indexed in PubMed, Web of Science: Science Citation Index Expanded, and Scopus.

The journal has a 2018 impact factor of 2.139.
