= Animal Biology =

Peer-reviewed scientific journal

- Discipline: Zoology
- Language: English
- Edited by: M. Muller

Publication details
- Former name(s): Archives Néerlandaises de Zoologie, Netherlands Journal of Zoology
- History: 1872–present
- Publisher: Brill Publishers on behalf of the Royal Dutch Zoological Society (The Netherlands)
- Frequency: Quarterly
- Impact factor: 0.617 (2015)

Standard abbreviations
- ISO 4: Anim. Biol.

Indexing
- ISSN: 1570-7555 (print); 1570-7563 (web)
- OCLC no.: 53185481

Links
- Journal homepage; Online access; Online access to Netherlands Journal of Zoology (1967–2003); Online access to Archives Néerlandaises de Zoologie (1934–1966)

Animal Biology is a peer-reviewed scientific journal in the field of zoology. It is the official journal of the Koninklijke Nederlandse Dierkundige Vereniging (Royal Dutch Zoological Society) and published on behalf of the society by Brill Publishers. The journal was established in 1872 as the Archives Néerlandaises de Zoologie and renamed Netherlands Journal of Zoology in 1967. It has been known under its current name since 2004.

== Abstracting and indexing ==
According to the Journal Citation Reports, the journal's 2010 impact factor is 0.879 and it is indexed in BIOSIS, CABS, Current Contents/Agriculture, Biology and Environmental Sciences, FISHLIT, GeoAbstracts, Science Citation Index, and Scopus.
