= Canadian Journal of Zoology =

- Discipline: Zoology
- Language: English, French
- Edited by: R. Mark Brigham and Céline Audet

Publication details
- History: 1951-present
- Publisher: Canadian Science Publishing (Canada)
- Frequency: Monthly
- Impact factor: 1.597 (2020)

Standard abbreviations
- ISO 4: Can. J. Zool.

Indexing
- CODEN: CJZOAG
- ISSN: 0008-4301 (print); 1480-3283 (web)
- LCCN: 53031088
- OCLC no.: 39737158

Links
- Journal homepage; Online access; Online archive

The Canadian Journal of Zoology is a peer-reviewed scientific journal that covers zoology. It was established in 1951 as the continuation of Canadian Journal of Research, Section D: Zoological Sciences, and is associated with the Canadian Society of Zoologists.

== Abstracting and indexing ==
The journal is abstracted and/or indexed in:

- Agricola
- Agricultural Engineering Abstracts
- Animal Behavior Abstracts
- Animal Breeding Abstracts
- Aquatic Sciences & Fisheries Abstracts
- BIOBASE
- Biological & Agricultural Index
- Biomedical Reference Collection
- BIOSIS
- CAB Abstracts
- Canadian Zoology Abstracts
- Chemical Abstracts
- Current Awareness in Biological Sciences
- Current Contents
- Entomology Abstracts
- Fish, Fisheries and Aquatic Biodiversity Worldwide
- Index Veterinarius
- PASCAL
- Protozoological Abstracts
- Referativny Zhurnal
- Science Citation Index
- Scopus
