= The Zoological Record =

Index of zoological literature

- Producer: Clarivate Analytics
- History: 1865–present
- Languages: English

Access
- Providers: Clarivate Analytics, Ovid Technologies, Dialog, ProQuest, EBSCO Information Services
- Cost: Subscription

Coverage
- Disciplines: Zoology
- Temporal coverage: 1864 – present
- No. of records: over 3,500,000

Print edition
- Print title: The Zoological Record
- Print dates: 1864–2016
- ISSN: 0144-3607

Links
- Website: clarivate.com/academia-government/scientific-and-academic-research/research-discovery-and-referencing/web-of-science/zoological-record/
- Title list(s): mjl.clarivate.com/cgi-bin/jrnlst/jlresults.cgi?PC=B7

The Zoological Record (ZR) is an electronic index of zoological literature that also serves as the unofficial register of scientific names in zoology.

It was started as a print publication in 1864 by the Zoological Society of London, as The Record of Zoological Literature, and changed its name to the Zoological Record in 1870. From 1980 to 2004, the ZR was published by BIOSIS, from 2004 to 2016 it was published by Thomson Reuters, and from 2016 to the present it has been published by Clarivate Analytics. The print version ceased in 2016, but the publication continues as an electronic index.

== History ==
In 1864, Albert Günther and a group of zoologists associated with the British Museum and the Zoological Society came together to begin work on The Record of Zoological Literature, the first volume of which was published in 1865 by John Van Voorst, covering zoological literature that had been published in 1864. This work was intended to be an English language counterpart to the German language zoological index Archiv für Naturgeschichte, but without the Archiv's publication delays. After the first six volumes were published, Van Voorst withdrew as publisher due to a lack of profits from the work. Concerned zoologists then formed the Zoological Association and published volumes 7–22 (1870–1885) as the Zoological Record. In 1886, the Zoological Association passed publication duties on to the Zoological Society. In 1900 a competing publication, the International Catalogue of Scientific Literature, began publication. Section N of the Catalogue was intended to cover zoology, which caused subscription losses for the Zoological Record despite reviews stating that the Zoological Record was a superior publication. However, after negotiations, the Zoological Record itself became section N of the Catalogue. This arrangement ended with the advent of World War I.

In 1980, the Zoological Society of London joined forces with BIOSIS to co-produce the Zoological Record. This co-production helped get rid of the three-year lag in the publication of the index by instituting a "catch up" program to bring The Zoological Record up-to-date. This program was completed in 1988. In January 2001, BIOSIS partnered with Cambridge Scientific Abstracts to produce a related database, Zoological Record Plus, which included abstracts from the Biological Sciences database produced by CSA. February 2004 saw the acquisition of BIOSIS by Thomson ISI, again changing the producer of The Zoological Record. Following the merger of Thomson and Reuters, Zoological Record was produced by Thomson Reuters. As of 2024, it is published by Clarivate Analytics in electronic format only.

== Coverage ==
The Zoological Record began coverage of different phyla in different years, and as phyla have changed in both name and classification over time, the sections covering those phyla have also changed. What follows is a list of the phyla covered in the Zoological Record for different years:

1865	1900	1968	2007
1. Mammalia	1. General Subjects	1. Comprehensive zoology	1. Comprehensive zoology
2. Aves	2. Mammalia	2. Protozoa	2. Protozoa
3. Reptilia	3. Aves	3. Porifera	3. Porifera & Archaeocyatha
4. Pisces	4. Reptilia & Batrachia	4. Coelenterata	4. Coelenterata & Ctenophora
5. Mollusca	5. Pisces	5. Echinodermata	5. Echinodermata
6. Molluscoida	6. Tunicata	6. Vermes	6A. Platyhelminthes & Nematoda etc.
7. Crustacea	7. Mollusca	7. Brachiopoda	6B. Annelida & Miscellaneous minor phyla
8. Arachnida	8. Brachiopoda	8. Bryozoa	6C. Conodonta & Fossil miscellanea
9. Myriopoda	9. Bryozoa	9. Mollusca	7. Brachiopoda
10. Insecta	10. Crustacea	10. Crustacea	8. Bryozoa (Polyzoa) & Entoprocta
Coleoptera	11. Arachnida	11. Trilobita	9. Mollusca
Hymenoptera	12. Myriopoda & Prototracheata	12. Arachnida	10. Crustacea
Lepidoptera	13. Insecta	13. Insecta	11. Trilobitomorpha
Diptera	14. Echinoderma	14. Protochordata	12. Arachnida & Smaller arthropod groups
Neuroptera	15. Vermes	15. Pisces	13A. General Insecta & smaller orders
Orthoptera	16. Cœlenterata	16. Amphibia	13B. Coleoptera
Rhynchota	17. Spongiæ	17. Reptilia	13C. Diptera
11. Rotifera	18. Protozoa	18. Aves	13D. Lepidoptera
12. Annelida	Alphabetical Index of New Names of Genera and Subgenera	19. Mammalia	13E. Hymenoptera
13. Helminthes		20. List of new genera, etc.	13F. Hemiptera
14. Echinodermata			14. Protochordata
15. Cœlenterata			15. Pisces
16. Protozoa			16. Amphibia
			17. Reptilia
			18. Aves
			19. Mammalia
			20. List of new taxonomic names

== Zoological names ==
There has never been a single official repository for the recording of zoological names, despite the widespread recognition in the scientific community of the need for a comprehensive database of living organisms. The ZR remains the unofficial record of zoological names since it indexes approximately 90% of the world's literature in zoology.

In 1995, the International Code of Zoological Nomenclature was under development for the revised fourth edition (to be published in 1999). In the development, a recommendation was made for a process of "international notification" for new names in zoology. Since the Zoological Record indexes approximately 90% of the world literature on zoological nomenclature, it was seen as a good starting place for that process of notification. In response to this need, BIOSIS developed the Index to Organism Names (ION), a free and freely accessible database that serves as an index to those names published in the Zoological Record. When BIOSIS was purchased by Thomson Reuters, ION was updated with names from additional databases, such as BIOSIS Previews and Biological Abstracts.

Similar biological nomenclature organizations and databases exist, such as the Committee on Data for Science and Technology (CODATA), the Global Biodiversity Information Facility (GBIF), Species 2000, and the Taxonomic Database Working Group (TDWG). Web-based collaborative projects also exist, such as the Tree of Life Web Project, Encyclopedia of Life, Catalogue of Life, and Wikispecies.

== Online availability ==
Most of the issues of The Zoological Record, published between 1870 and 1922, are available online at the Biodiversity Heritage Library. More recent issues are not available at open access to the public in a digitised image format.
