= List of MDPI academic journals =

This is a list of academic journals published by MDPI. As of September 2022, MDPI publishes 399 peer-reviewed academic journals and nine conference journals.

List of MDPI journals
Journal name	Subject	Established	ISSN
Acoustics	Engineering	2019	2624-599X
Actuators	Engineering	2012	2076-0825
Administrative Sciences	Business	2011	2076-3387
Adolescents	Health	2021	2673-7051
Advances in Respiratory Medicine (formerly Pneumonologia i Alergologia Polska)	Health		2451-4934
Aerospace	Engineering	2014	2226-4310
Agriculture	Agriculture	2011	2077-0472
AgriEngineering	Agriculture	2019	2624-7402
Agronomy	Agriculture	2011	2073-4395
AI	Computers	2020	2673-2688
Algorithms	Mathematics	2008	1999-4893
Allergies	Medicine	2021	2313-5786
Alloys	Engineering	2022	2674-063X
Analytica	Natural sciences	2020	2673-4532
Analytics			
Anatomia			
Animals	Veterinary	2011	2076-2615
Antibiotics	Medicine	2012	2079-6382
Antibodies	Medicine	2012	2073-4468
Antioxidants	Medicine	2012	2076-3921
Applied Mechanics	Engineering	2020	2673-3161
Applied Microbiology	Natural sciences	2021	2673-8007
Applied Nano	Natural sciences	2020	2673-3501
Applied Sciences	Engineering	2011	2076-3417
Applied System Innovation	Engineering	2018	2571-5577
AppliedChem	Natural sciences	2021	2673-9623
AppliedMath	Mathematics	2021	2673-9909
Aquaculture Journal	Agriculture	2021	2673-9496
Architecture	Engineering	2021	2673-8945
Arthropoda (formerly Entomology)		2022	
Arts	Arts	2012	2076-0752
Astronomy	Natural sciences	2022	2674-0346
Atmosphere	Natural sciences	2010	2073-4433
Atoms	Natural sciences	2013	2218-2004
Audiology Research	Medicine	2011	2039-4349
Automation	Engineering	2020	2673-4052
Axioms	Mathematics	2012	2075-1680
Bacteria		2022	2674-1334
Batteries	Engineering	2015	2313-0105
Behavioral Sciences		2011	2076-328X
Beverages	Agriculture	2015	2306-5710
Big Data and Cognitive Computing	Computing	2017	2504-2289
BioChem		2021	2673-6411
Bioengineering		2014	2306-5354
Biologics		2021	2673-8449
Biology		2012	2079-7737
Biomass		2021	2673-8783
Biomechanics		2021	2673-7078
BioMed		2021	2673-8430
Biomedicines		2013	2227-9059
BioMedInformatics		2021	2673-7426
Biomimetics		2016	2313-7673
Biomolecules		2011	2218-273X
Biophysica		2021	2673-4125
Biosensors		2011	2079-6374
BioTech (formerly High-Throughput)		2012	2673-6284
Birds		2020	2673-6004
Brain Sciences		2011	2076-3425
Buildings	Engineering	2011	2075-5309
Businesses		2021	2673-7116
C	Natural sciences	2015	2311-5629
Cancers		2009	2072-6694
Cardiogenetics		2011	2035-8148
Catalysts		2011	2073-4344
Cells	Biology	2012	2073-4409
Ceramics		2018	2571-6131
Challenges		2010	2078-1547
ChemEngineering		2017	2305-7084
Chemical Journal on Internet			
Chemistry		2019	2624-8549
Chemosensors		2013	2227-9040
Children		2014	2227-9067
Chips		2022	2674-0729
CivilEng		2020	2673-4109
Clean Technologies		2019	2571-8797
Climate		2013	2225-1154
Clinical and Translational Neuroscience		2017	2514-183X
Clinics and Practice		2011	2039-7283
Clocks & Sleep		2019	2624-5175
Coasts		2021	2673-964X
Coatings		2011	2079-6412
Colloids and Interfaces		2017	2504-5377
Colorants		2022	2079-6447
Compounds		2021	2673-6918
Computation		2013	2079-3197
Computers		2012	2073-431X
Condensed Matter		2016	2410-3896
Conservation		2021	2673-7159
Construction Materials		2021	2673-7108
Corrosion and Materials Degradation		2020	2624-5558
Cosmetics		2014	2079-9284
COVID		2021	2673-8112
Crops		2021	2673-7655
Cryptography		2017	2410-387X
Crystals		2011	2073-4352
Current Issues in Molecular Biology		1999	1467-3045
Current Oncology		1994	1718-7729
Dairy		2020	2624-862X
Data		2016	2306-5729
Dentistry Journal		2013	2304-6767
Dermato		2021	2673-6179
Dermatopathology		2014	2296-3529
Designs		2017	2411-9660
Diabetology		2020	2673-4540
Diagnostics	Medicine	2011	2075-4418
Dietetics		2022	2674-0311
Digital		2021	2673-6470
Disabilities		2021	2673-7272
Diseases		2013	2079-9721
Diversity		2009	1424-2818
DNA		2021	2673-8856
Drones	Engineering	2017	2504-446X
Drugs and Drug Candidates			
Dynamics		2021	2673-8716
Earth		2020	2673-4834
Ecologies		2020	2673-4133
Econometrics		2013	2225-1146
Economies		2013	2227-7099
Education Sciences		2011	2227-7102
Electricity		2020	2673-4826
Electrochem		2020	2673-3293
Electronic Materials		2020	2673-3978
Electronics		2012	2079-9292
Encyclopedia		2021	2673-8392
Endocrines		2020	2673-396X
Energies		2008	1996-1073
Energy Storage and Applications		2024	3042-4011
Eng		2020	2673-4117
Engineering Proceedings			
Entropy		1999	1099-4300
Environments		2014	2076-3298
Epidemiologia		2020	2673-3986
Epigenomes		2017	2075-4655
European Burn Journal (formerly European Journal of Burn Care)		2020	2673-1991
European Journal of Investigation in Health, Psychology and Education		2011	2254-9625
Fermentation	Agriculture	2015	2311-5637
Fibers	Engineering	2013	2079-6439
FinTech		2022	2674-1032
Fire		2018	2571-6255
Fishes		2016	2410-3888
Fluids		2016	2311-5521
Foods	Agriculture	2012	2304-8158
Forecasting		2019	2571-9394
Forensic Sciences		2021	2673-6756
Forests		2010	1999-4907
Fossil Studies			
Foundations		2021	2673-9321
Fractal and Fractional		2017	2504-3110
Fuels		2020	2673-3994
Future Internet		2009	1999-5903
Future Pharmacology	Medicine	2021	2673-9879
Future Transportation		2021	2673-7590
Galaxies	Astronomy	2013	2075-4434
Games		2010	2073-4336
Gases		2021	2673-5628
Gastroenterology Insights	Medicine	2009	2036-7422
Gastrointestinal Disorders		2019	2624-5647
Gels		2015	2310-2861
Genealogy		2017	2313-5778
Genes		2010	2073-4425
Geographies		2021	2673-7086
GeoHazards		2020	2624-795X
Geomatics		2021	2673-7418
Geosciences		2011	2076-3263
Geotechnics		2021	2673-7094
Geriatrics		2016	2308-3417
Healthcare		2013	2227-9032
Hearts		2020	2673-3846
Hemato (formerly Bloods)		2020	2673-6357
Hematology Reports (formerly Hematology Reviews)	Medicine		1970-6790
Heritage		2018	2571-9408
High-Throughput (formerly Microarrays)			2076-3905
Histories		2021	2409-9252
Horticulturae		2015	2311-7524
Humanities		2012	2076-0787
Humans		2021	2673-9461
Hydrobiology		2022	2673-9917
Hydrogen		2020	2673-4141
Hydrology		2014	2306-5338
Hygiene		2021	2673-947X
Immuno		2021	2673-5601
Infectious Disease Reports		2009	2036-7449
Informatics		2014	2227-9709
Information		2010	2078-2489
Infrastructures		2016	2412-3811
Inorganics		2013	2304-6740
Insects		2010	2075-4450
Instruments		2017	2410-390X
International Journal of Environmental Research and Public Health		2004	1660-4601
International Journal of Financial Studies		2013	2227-7072
International Journal of Molecular Sciences	Chemistry	2000	1422-0067
International Journal of Neonatal Screening		2015	2409-515X
International Journal of Plant Biology			
International Journal of Translational Medicine		2021	2673-8937
International Journal of Turbomachinery, Propulsion and Power		2016	2504-186X
Inventions		2016	2411-5134
IoT		2020	2624-831X
ISPRS International Journal of Geo-Information		2012	2220-9964
J	Science	2018	2571-8800
Journal of Ageing and Longevity		2021	2673-9259
Journal of Cardiovascular Development and Disease	Medicine	2014	2308-3425
Journal of Clinical Medicine		2012	2077-0383
Journal of Composites Science		2017	2504-477X
Journal of Cybersecurity and Privacy		2021	2624-800X
Journal of Developmental Biology		2013	2221-3759
Journal of Functional Biomaterials		2010	2079-4983
Journal of Functional Morphology and Kinesiology		2016	2411-5142
Journal of Fungi		2015	2309-608X
Journal of Imaging		2015	2313-433X
Journal of Intelligence		2013	2079-3200
Journal of Low Power Electronics and Applications		2011	2079-9268
Journal of Manufacturing and Materials Processing		2017	2504-4494
Journal of Marine Science and Engineering		2013	2077-1312
Journal of Molecular Pathology		2020	2673-5261
Journal of Nanotheranostics		2020	2624-845X
Journal of Nuclear Engineering		2020	2673-4362
Journal of Open Innovation: Technology, Market, and Complexity	Economics	2015	2199-8531
Journal of Otorhinolaryngology, Hearing and Balance Medicine		2018	2504-463X
Journal of Personalized Medicine		2011	2075-4426
Journal of Respiration		2021	2673-527X
Journal of Risk and Financial Management		2008	1911-8074
Journal of Sensor and Actuator Networks	Engineering	2012	2224-2708
Journal of Theoretical and Applied Electronic Commerce Research		2006	0718-1876
Journal of Xenobiotics		2011	2039-4713
Journal of Zoological and Botanical Gardens		2020	2673-5636
Journalism and Media		2020	2673-5172
Kidney and Dialysis		2021	2673-8236
Knowledge		2021	2673-9585
Land		2012	2073-445X
Languages	Humanities	2016	2226-471X
Laws		2012	2075-471X
Life	Biology	2011	2075-1729
Liquids		2021	2673-8015
Literature		2021	2410-9789
Livers		2021	2673-4389
Logics		2022	2813-0405
Logistics		2017	2305-6290
Lubricants		2013	2075-4442
Machine Learning and Knowledge Extraction		2019	2504-4990
Machines		2013	2075-1702
Macromol		2021	2673-6209
Magnetism		2021	2673-8724
Magnetochemistry		2015	2312-7481
Marine Drugs	Medicine	2003	1660-3397
Materials		2008	1996-1944
Mathematical and Computational Applications		1996	2297-8747
Mathematics	Mathematics	2013	2227-7390
Medical Sciences		2013	2076-3271
Medicina	Medicine	1920	1648-9144
Medicines		2014	2305-6320
Membranes		2011	2077-0375
Merits		2021	2673-8104
Metabolites		2011	2218-1989
Metals		2011	2075-4701
Meteorology		2022	2674-0494
Methane		2022	2674-0389
Methods and Protocols		2018	2409-9279
Metrology		2021	2673-8244
Micro		2021	2673-8023
Microbiology Research		2010	2036-7481
Micromachines		2010	2072-666X
Microorganisms		2013	2076-2607
Microplastics		2022	2673-8929
Minerals		2011	2075-163X
Mining		2021	2673-6489
Modelling		2020	2673-3951
Molbank	Natural sciences	1997	1422-8599
Molecules		1996	1420-3049
Multimodal Technologies and Interaction		2017	2414-4088
Muscles			
Nanoenergy Advances		2021	2673-706X
Nanomanufacturing		2021	2673-687X
Nanomaterials		2011	2079-4991
Network		2021	2673-8732
Neuroglia		2018	2571-6980
Neurology International	Medicine	2009	2035-8377
NeuroSci		2020	2673-4087
Nitrogen		2020	2504-3129
Non-Coding RNA	Genetics	2015	2311-553X
Nursing Reports		2011	2039-4403
Nutraceuticals		2021	1661-3821
Nutrients	Food	2009	2072-6643
Obesities		2021	2673-4168
Oceans		2020	2673-1924
Onco		2021	2673-7523
Optics		2020	2673-3269
Oral		2021	2673-6373
Organics		2020	2673-401X
Organoids		2022	2674-1172
Osteology	Medicine	2021	2673-4036
Oxygen		2021	2673-9801
Parasitologia		2021	2673-6772
Particles		2018	2571-712X
Pathogens		2012	2076-0817
Pathophysiology		1994	1873-149X
Pediatric Reports	Medicine	2009	2036-7503
Pharmaceuticals	Medicine	2004	1424-8247
Pharmaceutics	Medicine	2009	1999-4923
Pharmacy	Medicine	2013	2226-4787
Philosophies		2016	2409-9287
Photochem		2021	2673-7256
Photonics		2014	2304-6732
Phycology		2021	2673-9410
Physchem		2021	2673-7167
Physical Sciences Forum			
Physics		2019	2624-8174
Physiologia		2021	2673-9488
Plants		2012	2223-7747
Plasma		2018	2571-6182
Pollutants		2021	2673-4672
Polymers		2009	2073-4360
Polysaccharides		2020	2673-4176
Poultry		2022	2674-1164
Powders		2022	2674-0516
Processes		2013	2227-9717
Prosthesis		2019	2673-1592
Proteomes		2013	2227-7382
Psych		2019	2624-8611
Psychiatry International		2020	2673-5318
Publications		2013	2304-6775
Quantum Beam Science		2017	2412-382X
Quantum Reports		2019	2624-960X
Quaternary		2018	2571-550X
Radiation		2021	2673-592X
Reactions		2020	2624-781X
Recycling		2016	2313-4321
Not to be confused with "Religion", published by Routledge. Religions		2010	2077-1444
Remote Sensing	Engineering	2009	2072-4292
Reports		2018	2571-841X
Reproductive Medicine	Medicine	2020	2673-3897
Resources	Environments	2012	2079-9276
Rheumato		2021	2674-0621
Risks		2013	2227-9091
Robotics		2012	2218-6581
Ruminants		2021	2673-933X
Safety		2015	2313-576X
Sci		2019	2413-4155
Scientia Pharmaceutica	Medicine	1930	2218-0532
Seeds		2022	2674-1024
Sensors	Engineering	2001	1424-8220
Separations (formerly Chromatography)		2014	2297-8739
Sexes		2020	2411-5118
Signals		2020	2624-6120
Sinusitis (formerly Sinusitis and Asthma)	Medicine	2016	2673-351X
Smart Cities	Social sciences	2018	2624-6511
Social Sciences		2012	2076-0760
Societies		2011	2075-4698
Software			
Soil Systems (formerly Soils)		2017	2571-8789
Solar		2021	2673-9941
Solids		2020	2673-6497
Sports		2013	2075-4663
Standards		2021	2305-6703
Stats		2018	2571-905X
Stresses		2021	2673-7140
Surfaces		2018	2571-9637
Surgeries	Medicine	2020	2673-4095
Surgical Techniques Development	Medicine		
Sustainability		2009	2071-1050
Sustainable Chemistry		2020	2673-4079
Symmetry	Mathematics	2009	2073-8994
SynBio		2022	2674-0583
Systems	Engineering	2013	2079-8954
Taxonomy		2021	2673-6500
Technologies		2013	2227-7080
Telecom		2020	2673-4001
Textiles		2021	2673-7248
Thalassemia Reports		2011	2039-4365
Thermo		2021	2673-7264
Tomography		2015	2379-139X
Tourism and Hospitality		2020	2673-5768
Toxics		2013	2305-6304
Toxins	Medicine	2009	2072-6651
Transplantology	Medicine	2020	2673-3943
Trauma Care (formerly Traumas)	Medicine	2021	2673-866X
Tropical Medicine and Infectious Disease	Medicine	2016	2414-6366
Universe		2015	2218-1997
Urban Science		2017	2413-8851
Uro		2021	2673-4397
Vaccines		2013	2076-393X
Vehicles		2019	2624-8921
Venereology		2022	2674-0710
Veterinary Sciences		2014	2306-7381
Vibration		2018	2571-631X
Viruses	Medicine	2009	1999-4915
Vision		2017	2411-5150
Water		2009	2073-4441
Wind		2021	2674-032X
Women		2021	2673-4184
World		2020	2673-4060
World Electric Vehicle Journal		2007	2032-6653
Youth		2021	2673-995X
Zoonotic Diseases (formerly Zoonoses)		2021	2813-0227
