= Insect (disambiguation) =

Insects are six-legged arthropods of the class Insecta.

Insect, Insects or Insecta may also refer to:

- Insects (album) by the band Breed 77, or the title track
- Insects (film), 2018 Czech animated film
- Insects (journal), scientific periodical on entomology
- "Insects" (Life), 2009 TV nature documentary episode
- Insect-class gunboat
- "Insects", a 2010 song by Ash from their A–Z Series
- Insecta (board game)

== See also ==
- Insectia, nature program
- Insectoid (disambiguation)
- Bug (disambiguation)
