= Vitaliy Khutoryanskiy =

British pharmaceutical scientist

- Born: May 1, 1975 (age 51)
- Education: Al-Farabi Kazakh National University
- Employer: University of Reading
- Known for: his research on interpolymer complexes, water-soluble polymers, hydrogels, functionalized nanoparticles and drug delivery
- Website: https://www.reading.ac.uk/pharmacy/staff/professor-vitaliy-khutoryanskiy

Vitaliy Khutoryanskiy FRSC FAPS FIMMM is a British and Kazakhstani scientist, a Professor of Formulation Science and a Royal Society Industry Fellow at the University of Reading. His research focuses on polymers, biomaterials, nanomaterials, drug delivery, and pharmaceutical sciences. He also develops alternatives to animal testing, using invertebrates to support the global 3Rs principle of replacing, reducing, and refining animal use in science. Khutoryanskiy has published over 300 original research articles, book chapters, and reviews. His publications have attracted > 17000 citations and his current h-index is 62. He received several prestigious awards in recognition for his research in polymers, colloids and drug delivery as well as for contributions to research peer-review and mentoring of early career researchers. He holds several honorary professorship titles from different universities.

== Education and career ==
Khutoryanskiy was born and grew up in Almaty, Kazakhstan. He studied at Al-Farabi Kazakh National University, graduating with a BSc in Chemistry in 1996. He earned his MSc in Polymer Chemistry in 1998, and then his PhD in Polymer Chemistry in 2000, both from the same institution. His PhD project was focused on the studies of hydrogen-bonded interpolymer complexes and preparation of hydrophilic films. During his PhD studies, he also spent 4 months in the research group of Janusz Rosiak at Łódź University of Technology, Poland, where specialised in radiation chemistry of hydrophilic polymers. He worked as a Lecturer in Polymer Science at Al-Farabi Kazakh National University in 2000-2002. In 2002, he moved to the United Kingdom and joined the research group of Ijeoma Uchegbu at the University of Strathclyde as a postdoctoral research assistant, where he worked on the synthesis of chitosan amphiphiles and their studies for drug delivery. In 2004, he moved to the University of Manchester to work as a postdoctoral research assistant of Nicola Tirelli, studying the design of oxidation-responsive nanoparticles. In 2005, Khutoryanskiy was appointed as a Lecturer in Pharmaceutics at newly-established Reading School of Pharmacy, University of Reading. In 2010, he was promoted to Reader (Associate Professor) in Pharmaceutical Materials and in 2014, he became full Professor of Formulation Science. In 2023, he became the founding director of the Physicochemical, Ex Vivo and Invertebrate Tests and Analysis Centre (PEVITAC) at the University of Reading.

== Research ==
Earlier research of Khutoryanskiy was focused on the studies of hydrogen-bonded interpolymer complexes formed by poly(carboxylic acids) and various non-ionic polymers in aqueous and organic solvents. He established the factors affecting the complexation between polymers such as solvent nature, pH and ionic strength of solutions, nature and molecular weight of interacting polymers as well as environmental temperature. He also researched radiation-mediated grafting of hydrophilic polymers on polyolefin surfaces and complexes formed between linear polymers and hydrogels. His current research broadly focuses on water-soluble polymers, colloids and hydrogels for applications in drug delivery, biomaterials, and various formulations (food technology, health care products and agrochemicals). His group has pioneered several new families of polymers and nanomaterials with enhanced mucoadhesive properties, they also were the first to develop mucosa-mimetic polymeric hydrogels that can be used in place of animal tissues to study mucoadhesive dosage forms and demonstrated that nanoparticles decorated with poly(2-oxazolines), poly(2-hydroxyethylacrylate) and poly(N-vinylpyrrolidone) exhibit mucus-penetrating properties similar to PEGylated nanocarriers. Research was carried out to evaluate the adhesive and retention properties of various polymer and colloidal compositions in the oral cavity, with the goal of enhancing the taste of dietary supplements and improving the effectiveness of toothpastes. Additionally, the feasibility of using water-soluble polymers to increase the retention of pesticides on agricultural plant surfaces was explored. His other significant research contributions include the new synthesis of thiolated silica nanoparticles, which were subsequently commercialised by PolySciTech; studies of novel ocular penetration enhancers, nanoparticles penetration into various biological membranes, formulation of encapsulated probiotic bacteria, new method for synthesis of hydrogels, development of new toxicological assays using planaria and the use of various poly(2-oxazolines) for preparation of solid drug dispersions and iodophors. He has also contributed to the use of invertebrate organisms, such as planaria, for testing the biological activity of drugs and their formulations as alternatives to vertebrate models.

== Books ==
He edited and co-edited several books

- Hydrogen-bonded Interpolymer Complexes: Formation, Structure and Applications (edited by V.V. Khutoryanskiy and G.Staikos), World Scientific, 2009
- Mucoadhesive Materials and Drug Delivery Systems (edited by V.V. Khutoryanskiy), John Wiley & Sons, 2014
- Temperature-responsive Polymers: Chemistry, Properties, and Applications (edited by V.V. Khutoryanskiy and T.K. Georgiou), John Wiley & Sons, 2018
- Advances in Mucoadhesive Polymers and Formulations for Transmucosal Drug Delivery (edited by V.V. Khutoryanskiy), MDPI AG, 2020
- Solid Dispersions for Drug Delivery: Applications and Preparation Methods (edited by V.V. Khutoryanskiy and H. Al-Obaidi), MDPI AG, 2022

== Awards and honours ==
- International Atomic Energy Agency (IAEA) Fellowship at the Institute of Applied Radiation Chemistry, University of Łódź, Poland (October 1999 - February 2000)
- Young Scientist Fellowship from the International Association for the Promotion of Cooperation with Scientists from the New Independent States of the Former Soviet Union (INTAS, 2001)
- McBain Medal, a joint award of the Royal Society of Chemistry (RSC) and the Society of Chemical Industry (SCI), for research in the field of colloid, polymer and interface science, 2012
- Honorary Professor of Semey State Medical University, Kazakhstan, 2012
- Honorary Professor of Shakarim State University of Semey, Kazakhstan, 2014
- SAFEA-RSC Visiting Researcher to the University of Chinese Academy of Sciences and to Shanghai University, China, 2014
- Fellow of the Royal Society of Chemistry (FRSC), 2015
- Sentinel of Science Award as one of the top 10% reviewers in chemistry, Publons, 2016
- Honorary Professor of Kazan State Medical University, Russia, 2017
- Polymers Best Paper Award from the journal Polymers (MDPI), 2020
- PhD Supervisor of the Year Award (FindAUniversity), 2020
- Innovative Science Award, The Academy of Pharmaceutical Sciences, UK, 2022
- Royal Society Industry Fellow, 2023
- Honorary Professor of Karaganda Buketov University, Kazakhstan, 2024
- Fellow of the Academy of Pharmaceutical Sciences, UK, 2024
- Fellow of the Institute of Materials, Minerals and Mining (FIMMM), UK, 2025
- Foreign Member of National Engineering Academy of Kazakhstan, 2025

== Professional services ==
Khutoryanskiy serves on editorial boards of several international journals, including European Polymer Journal (Elsevier), Journal of Pharmaceutical Sciences (Elsevier), Pharmaceutics (MDPI), Polymers (MDPI), Gels (MDPI) and Reviews and Advanced in Chemistry (Springer). He is the Deputy Editor-in-Chief of Eurasian Journal of Chemistry. Also he is associate editor and member of journal editorial boards of several national journals in Kazakhstan, Uzbekistan and Russia. He guest edited several special issues of Pharmaceutics, Polymers, Gels and Polymers for Advanced Technologies. He was involved in organisation of many conferences and symposia as a chair, co-chair and member of organising committees. He is recognised for his outstanding contributions to research peer review and mentoring of early career researchers. Khutoryanskiy has also made substantial contribution to the development of research, training and education of students and researchers at various universities in Kazakhstan.

== Policy and outreach ==
Beyond his research activities, Khutoryanskiy contributes to discussions on science policy and public communication. He has been cited by the UK Science Media Centre for expert views on alternatives to animal testing in cosmetics regulation. His letter to Chemistry World addressing the environmental and health implications of fireworks led to a subsequent debate among readers. In 2026, Khutoryanskiy took part in the Royal Society Pairing Scheme, a science-policy programme in which researchers are paired with parliamentarians or civil servants. He was paired with Yuan Yang, MP for Earley and Woodley, and discussed alternatives to animal experimentation, research funding and wider challenges facing UK universities and research.
