= Biology (disambiguation) =

Biology is the scientific study of life, also referred to as biosciences.

Biology may also refer to:

- Biology: The Unity and Diversity of Life, a college-level textbook compiled by Cecie Starr and Ralph Taggart
- Biology (textbook), a textbook by the scientist Neil Campbell, first published in 1987
- Miller & Levine Biology, a textbook by Kenneth R. Miller and Joseph Levine
- Biology (journal), a scientific journal published by MDPI
- Biology (band), an American rock/indie band
- "Biology" (song), a 2005 song by Girls Aloud
- "Biology", an American jazz song sung by Sue Raney
- "Biology", a song by Jane Child from Jane Child

== See also ==
- Biologicals, a peer-reviewed journal
