= Mieszko Więckiewicz =

Polish professor of medicine who discoverered the genetic basis for sleep bruxism

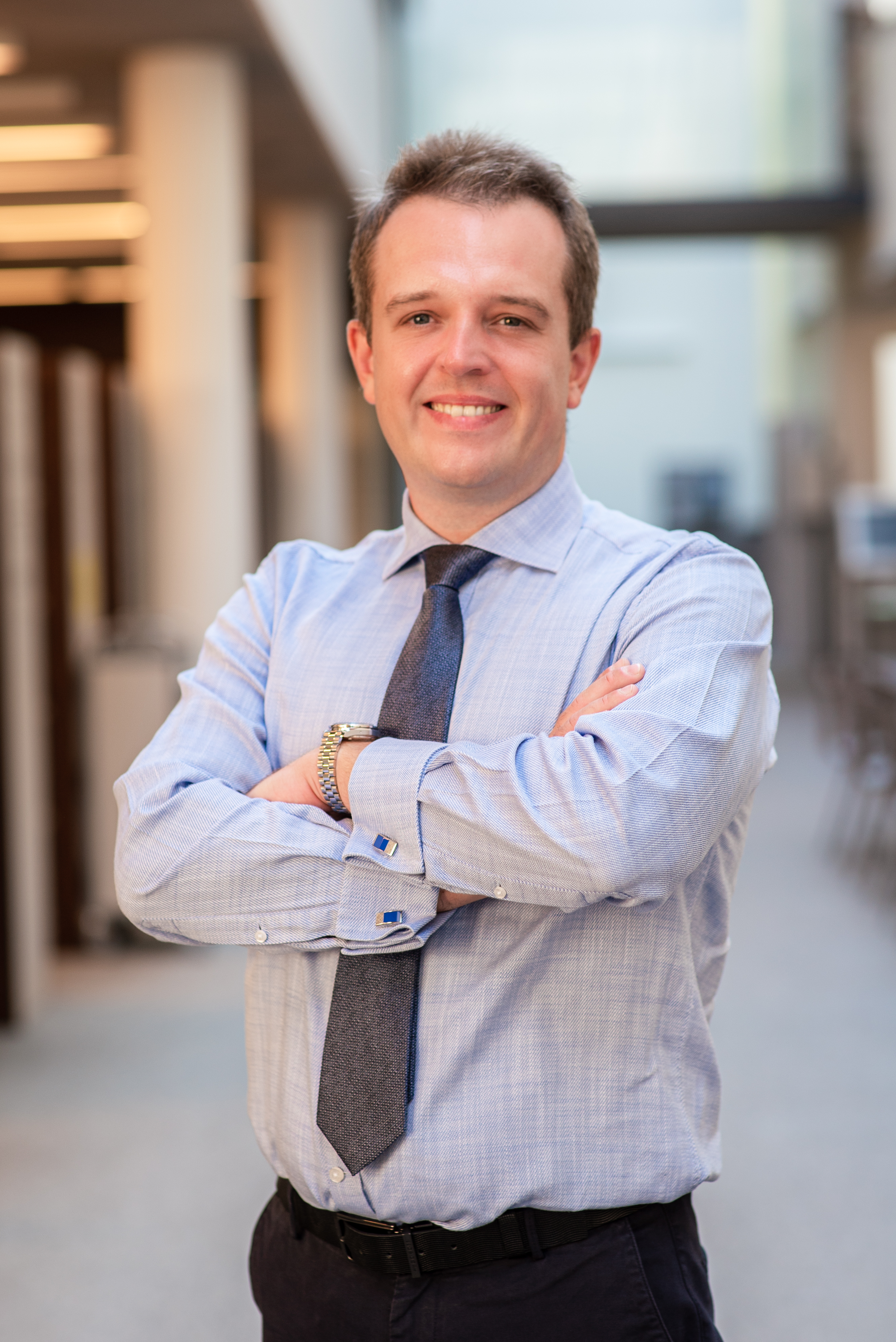
- Born: January 6, 1985 (age 41); Wrocław
- Education: Wrocław Medical University
- Known for: genetic basis for sleep bruxism and sleep apnea; serotonergic and dopaminergic pathways in the etiology of sleep bruxism and sleep breathing disorders
- Scientific career
- Fields: Dentistry
- Thesis: Application of light-curing resin and selected articulating systems in the manufacturing of occlusal stabilization splints (2013)

Mieszko Więckiewicz is a Polish doctor of dental medicine, professor of medicine and health sciences, specialist in prosthodontics, and master of business administration. He is one of the discoverers of the genetic basis for sleep bruxism and sleep apnea, as well as the role of the serotonergic and dopaminergic pathways in the etiology of sleep bruxism and sleep breathing disorders.

== Education ==
He graduated from the Wroclaw Medical University in 2009.

He received practical postgraduate training in the fields of articulation, dental occlusion, and occlusal splints in Austria and Germany. As a recipient of multiple scholarship programs (2011, 2012, 2014/2015), he conducted research at the Dresden University of Technology in Germany.

In 2016 he completed an advanced training program in the field of diagnostics and treatment of the temporomandibular disorders at the University of Kentucky, led by Jeffrey P. Okeson, DMD. In 2017, he completed a specialist training in the field of diagnostics of temporomandibular disorders according to the Diagnostic Criteria for Temporomandibular Disorders (DC/TMD) in San Francisco, USA. In 2018, he completed internships at Tel Aviv University's Orofacial Pain Division (Israel) and University of Kentucky's Orofacial Pain Clinic (USA).

== Career ==
Since 2010, he has been employed at the Wroclaw Medical University, and since 2012, he has been a visiting lecturer at the Department of Prosthodontics at the Dresden University of Technology. His scientific work focuses on the etiology, diagnostics, and management of temporomandibular disorders, dental sleep medicine, and modern and experimental materials applicable in dentistry.

In 2013, he defended his doctoral thesis, entitled “Application of light-curing resin and selected articulating systems in the manufacturing of occlusal stabilization splints.” In 2015 he was awarded the title of specialist in prosthodontics. In 2016 he obtained the habilitation degree in the field of medicine based on the scientific achievement entitled “Properties of innovative material technologies applicable in the prosthetic rehabilitation of functional disorders of the stomatognathic system.”

On March 10, 2020, he was awarded the title of professor of medical sciences and health sciences by the President of the Republic of Poland at the age of 35. In 2023, he obtained the title of MBA (Master of Business Administration) from the Polish-American Business School at the Faculty of Management of the Wrocław University of Science and Technology.

He is a member of the following international associations: the International Association for Dental Research, the European Academy of Orofacial Pain and Dysfunction, and the International College of Dentists.

Clinically, he specializes in the diagnostics and treatment of temporomandibular disorders, orofacial pain, dental sleep medicine, and full mouth rehabilitation.

== Publishing ==
He has authored and co-authored over 150 peer-reviewed articles. He is a member of the editorial boards of several journals, including Journal of Oral Rehabilitation, Journal of Oral & Facial Pain and Headache, CRANIO®: The Journal of Craniomandibular & Sleep Practice, Acta Odontologica Scandinavica, Journal of Clinical Medicine, Healthcare, Frontiers in Neurology, Frontiers in Psychiatry and Journal of Stomatology. He became the first Polish member of the editorial boards of the Journal of Oral Rehabilitation, Journal of Oral & Facial Pain and Headache and Acta Odontologica Scandinavica.

=== Dental and Medical Problems ===
He is the editor-in-chief of the journal Dental and Medical Problems, which received the Impact Factor by the Clarivate Analytics on June 28, 2023. In the 2025 edition of the Journal Citation Reports, Dental and Medical Problems achieved an Impact Factor (IF) of 3.9, ranking 18th out of 162 journals globally in the Dentistry, Oral Surgery & Medicine category (Q1). This is the highest position ever reached by a Polish academic medical journal published by a university.

== Awards and honors ==
- Individual Scientific Awards at the Wroclaw Medical University (2014, 2015, 2017-2025)
- Scholarship from the Polish Minister of Science and Higher Education for outstanding young scientists (2017)
- Medal of the Wroclaw Branch of the Polish Academy of Sciences for scientific achievements (2018)
- Second place in the “Supertalenty w Medycynie 2021” competition (2021)
- Laureate of World's TOP 2% Scientists ranking (Stanford University and Elsevier) (2023, 2024 and 2025)
- Bronze Cross of Merit (2024)
- Laureate of the "Golden OTIS" award for achievements in dentistry in 2023 (2024)
