= Journal of Xenobiotics =

- Discipline: Pharmacology
- Language: English

Publication details
- History: 2011–present
- Publisher: MDPI
- Frequency: Continuous
- Open access: Yes
- License: Creative Commons Attribution License
- Impact factor: 6.0 (2022)

Standard abbreviations
- ISO 4: J. Xenobiot.

Indexing
- ISSN: 2039-4713

Links
- Journal homepage

Journal of Xenobiotics is a peer-reviewed open-access scientific journal covering various aspects of xenobiotics research. It is published by MDPI and was established in 2011.

The journal publishes research articles, reviews, and commentaries related to xenobiotics research, including biochemistry, toxicology, pharmacology, and the environmental impact of xenobiotics.

== Abstracting and indexing ==
The journal is abstracted and indexed, for example, in:

- DOAJ
- ProQuest databases
- CAB Abstracts
- Science Citation Index Expanded
- Scopus

According to the Journal Citation Reports, the journal has a 2022 impact factor of 6.0.
