= Gabrielle Asset Brieger =

American scientist (1905 – 2003)

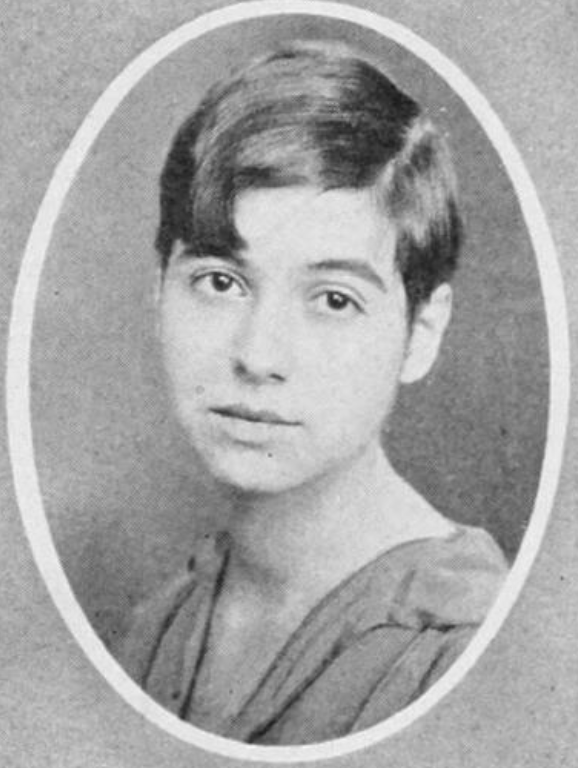
- Gabrielle Asset, later Brieger, from the 1928 yearbook of Barnard College
- Born: Gabrielle Marie Asset; August 21, 1905; Yonkers, New York
- Died: December 21, 2003 (aged 98); Philadelphia, Pennsylvania
- Occupation: Scientist

Gabrielle Asset Brieger (August 21, 1905 – December 21, 2003) was an American scientist. She researched aerosols at the United States Army's Edgewood Arsenal in Maryland, and was decorated twice with Exceptional Civilian Service awards.

== Early life and education ==
Asset was born in Yonkers, New York, the daughter of Henri Louis Asset and Marie Anne Therese Asset. Both of her parents were born in France. Her father was an engineer and businessman. She graduated from Barnard College in 1928. She earned a master's degree in physics and mathematics at Wellesley College in 1931, and another master's degree at Radcliffe College in 1933. She pursued further studies in electronics and fluid dynamics at Cornell University and Johns Hopkins University.

== Career ==
Asset taught physics, chemistry, biology, and mathematics at Dana Hall School, Milwaukee-Downer Seminary and Hood College as a young woman. She worked as a research engineer for the Brown Instrument Company in Philadelphia in the 1940s.

Asset spent most of her career working at the Army Chemical Research and Development Laboratories at Edgewood Arsenal in Maryland, from 1946 to 1961. At Edgewood, she designed wind tunnels and other devices for the study of aerosols. She was awarded the Army decoration for Exceptional Civilian Service in 1961 and again in 1964. She held a patent for a measuring apparatus with Fred J. Curran and Walter P. Wills, and for a microburette to produce droplets of uniform size.

Asset was a member of the American Association of University Women, American Physical Society, the American Industrial Hygiene Association, and the Scientific Research Society of America.

== Publications ==
Asset's research was published in government reports, and in professional journals including Electronics, Archives of Industrial Health, American Industrial Hygiene Association Journal, and Journal of Applied Meteorology and Climatology.

- "A Photoelectric Galvanometer Amplifier" (1945)
- "Deposition of Windborne Particles on Human Skin" (1954, with Doris Pury)
- "Nasal penetration of particles of small inertia in experimental animals." (1956, with L. E. Gongwer and Stella Ryan)
- "Effect of Particle Size and Wind Speed on Nasal Penetration of Wind-Borne Particles. Observations on Experimental Animals" (1957)
- "Nasal Sampling of Aerosols in Experimental Animals" (1958)
- "Effects of Inhalation of Aerosols of Three Engine Oils" (1958, with Martin A. Ross and Stella Ryan)
- "A Solenoid-Operated Microburet for Producing Uniform Droplets"(1959)
- "Note on the Lateral Displacement of Solid Particles and Gas in Shear Turbulent Flow" (1964, with Dennis Phillips)
- "Leeward Deposition of Particles on Cylinders from Moving Aerosols" (1967, with Thomas G. Hutchins)
- "Small-Particle Collection Efficiency of Vertical Cylinders in Flows of Low-Intensity Turbulence" (1970, with David Kimball and Milton Hoff)

== Personal life ==
In 1951, Asset married German-born professor of occupational medicine, Heinrich Brieger. Her husband died in 1972, and she died in 2003, at the age of 98, in Philadelphia.
