= Recycling (journal) =

- Discipline: Recycling, Sustainability, Waste management
- Language: English

Publication details
- History: 2016–present
- Publisher: MDPI
- Frequency: Continuous
- Open access: Yes
- License: Creative Commons Attribution License
- Impact factor: 4.6 (2023)

Standard abbreviations
- ISO 4: Recycling

Indexing
- ISSN: 2313-4321

Links
- Journal homepage

Recycling is a peer-reviewed open-access scientific journal covering various aspects of recycling, sustainability, and waste management. It is published by MDPI and was established in 2016.

The journal publishes research articles, reviews, and case studies on topics related to recycling technologies, circular economy, and environmental impact assessments.

== Abstracting and indexing ==
The journal is abstracted and indexed in:

- DOAJ
- ProQuest databases
- PubMed
- Science Citation Index Expanded
- Scopus

According to the Journal Citation Reports, the journal has a 2023 impact factor of 4.6.
