= Atmosphere (journal) =

- Discipline: Atmospheric sciences
- Language: English
- Edited by: Robert Talbot

Publication details
- History: 2010-present
- Publisher: MDPI
- Frequency: Monthly
- Open access: Yes
- Impact factor: 3.110 (2021)

Standard abbreviations
- ISO 4: Atmosphere

Indexing
- CODEN: ATMOCZ
- ISSN: 2073-4433
- OCLC no.: 773027071

Links
- Journal homepage

Atmosphere is a monthly peer-reviewed open access scientific journal covering research related to the Earth's atmosphere. The journal is published by MDPI and was established in 2010. The founding editor-in-chief was Daniela Jacob (Max Planck Institute for Meteorology) until 2014. She was succeeded by Robert Talbot (University of Houston) and then Allison C. Aiken (Los Alamos National Laboratory).

== Abstracting and indexing ==
The journal is abstracted and indexed in:

- Astrophysics Data System
- AGORA
- Agricultural Sciences and Technology
- CAB Abstracts
- Chemical Abstracts Service
- Current Contents/Physical, Chemical & Earth Sciences
- Directory of Open Access Journals
- Ei Compendex
- Genamics JournalSeek
- GEOBASE
- Global Health
- Inspec
- Journal Citation Reports
- Norwegian Register for Scientific Journals, Series and Publishers
- OARE
- Science Citation Index Expanded
- Scopus
- Web of Science

According to the Journal Citation Reports, the journal has a 2020 impact factor of 2.686.
