= Antibodies (journal) =

- Discipline: Immunology, antibody, immunoglobulins, antibody engineering, antibody therapeutics
- Language: English
- Edited by: Arne Skerra

Publication details
- History: 2012–present
- Publisher: MDPI (Switzerland)
- Frequency: Bimonthly
- Open access: Yes
- License: Creative Commons Attribution License
- Impact factor: 3.3 (2025)

Standard abbreviations
- ISO 4: Antibodies

Indexing
- CODEN: ANTICA
- ISSN: 2073-4468

Links
- Journal homepage

Antibodies is a bimonthly peer-reviewed open-access scientific journal covering research on antibodies, immunoglobulins, humoral immunity, antibody engineering, antibody-based therapeutics, diagnostics, and related aspects of immunology. It is published by MDPI and was established in 2012.

The journal publishes original research articles, review articles, communications, and other contributions related to antibody biology, antibody discovery and engineering, antibody-based therapeutics, diagnostics, and humoral immunity.

== Abstracting and indexing ==
The journal is abstracted and indexed in, for example:

- Directory of Open Access Journals
- Natural Science Collection (ProQuest)
- Academic Search Ultimate (EBSCO)
- Scopus
- Web of Science (Emerging Sources Citation Index)

According to the Journal Citation Reports, the journal has a 2025 impact factor of 3.3.
