= Neurology International =

- Discipline: Neurology
- Language: English
- Edited by: Junji Yamauchi

Publication details
- History: 2009–present
- Publisher: MDPI (Switzerland)
- Frequency: Quarterly
- Open access: Yes
- License: Creative Commons Attribution License
- Impact factor: 3.0 (2023)

Standard abbreviations
- ISO 4: Neurol. Int.

Indexing
- ISSN: 2035-8377
- OCLC no.: 436173185

Links
- Journal homepage

Neurology International is a peer-reviewed open-access scientific journal covering research in the field of neurology, including clinical and experimental studies. It is published quarterly by MDPI and was established in 2009. The Editor-in-Chief is Junji Yamauchi.

The journal publishes original research articles, reviews, and case reports on a wide range of topics in neurology, such as stroke, epilepsy, multiple sclerosis, and neuro-oncology.

== Abstracting and indexing ==
The journal is indexed in several bibliographic databases, including:

- Emerging Sources Citation Index (Clarivate)
- EBSCO
- DOAJ
- Embase
- Scopus

According to the Journal Citation Reports, the journal has a 2023 impact factor of 3.0.
