= Agronomy (journal) =

- Discipline: Agronomy, crop science, plant science, soil science
- Language: English
- Edited by: Leslie A. Weston

Publication details
- History: Since 2011
- Publisher: MDPI
- Frequency: Semimonthly
- Open access: Yes
- License: Creative Commons Attribution License
- Impact factor: 3.4 (2024)

Standard abbreviations
- ISO 4: Agronomy

Indexing
- CODEN: ABSGGL
- ISSN: 2073-4395
- OCLC no.: 823191600

Links
- Journal homepage

Agronomy is a semimonthly peer-reviewed open-access scientific journal covering research on all aspects of agronomy and related plant and soil sciences. It is published by MDPI and was established in 2011. The editor-in-chief is Leslie A. Weston (Charles Sturt University).

The journal publishes original research articles, reviews, communications, and short notes.

== Abstracting and indexing ==
The journal is abstracted and indexed in:

- Science Citation Index Expanded
- Scopus
- Directory of Open Access Journals
- ProQuest databases

According to the Journal Citation Reports, the journal has a 2024 impact factor of 3.4.
