= Lou Kondic =

Applied mathematician

Lou Kondic is an applied mathematician and Distinguished Professor in the Department of Mathematical Sciences at the New Jersey Institute of Technology (NJIT). His research focuses on thin film fluid dynamics, complex flows and granular media.

== Academic career ==
Kondic graduated with a BSc in physics from the University of Zagreb, Croatia in 1989. Following a brief period at the Institute Rudjer Boskovic, he began his PhD studies in physics at the City College of the City University of New York. After graduating in 1995, he spent two years at the Courant Institute of Mathematical Sciences of New York University working with Michael Shelley. Subsequently, he spent two years at Duke University working with Robert P. Behringer in the Department of Physics and Andrea Bertozzi in the Department of Mathematics. In 1999, he joined the faculty of the Department of Mathematical Sciences at New Jersey Institute of Technology, where he has held the title of Distinguished Professor since 2019.

== Research contributions ==
Kondic has contributed extensively to research progress in the fields of fluid mechanics and granular matter. His PhD Thesis "Theory of sonoluminescence" was one of the early works that helped understand the intriguing effect of light emerging from bubbles. His later work included extensive studies of stability of thin films in a variety of contexts ranging from gravitationally-driven flow on surfaces to instabilities of liquid metals on the nanoscale. He has also worked extensively on applications of computational topology, in particular persistence homology, to the analysis of interaction fields in granular systems. He uses his research to engage undergraduate students through various projects in NJIT's Capstone Laboratory, and is a co-founder of the Complex Flows and Soft Matter group.

According to Google Scholar, his publications have received over 4,500 citations, and his h-index is 37.

== Selected publications ==
- Kondic, L., Gonzalez, A. G., Diez J. A., Fowlkes, J. D., Rack, P., Liqud-State Dewetting of Pulsed-Laser-Heated Nanoscale Metal Films and Other Geometries, Annual Review of Fluid Mechanics 52, 23 (2020).
- Kondic, L., Goullet, A., O'Hern, C.S., Kramar, M., Mischaikow, K., Behringer, R.P., Topology of force networks in compressed granular media, Europhysics Letters 97, 54001 (2012).
- Kondic, L., Instabilities in gravity driven flow of thin fluid films, SIAM Review, 45, pages 95–115 (2003).
- Kondic, L., Shelley, M.J., Palffy-Muhoray, P., Non-Newtonian Hele-Shaw flow and the Saffman-Taylor instability, Physical Review Lett. 80, pages 1433–1436 (1998).
- Kondic, L., Gersten, J.I., Yuan, C., Theoretical studies of sonoluminescence radiation: Radiative transfer and parametric dependence, Physical Review E 52, pages 4976–4990 (1995).

== Professional service ==
- Crystals, editor, associate editor, 2021
- Nanomaterials, editor, associate editor, 2021
- Frontiers in Physics, editor, associate editor, 2021
- Journal of Engineering Mathematics, editor, associate editor, 2020
- Papers in Physics, editor, associate editor, 2019

== Honors & awards ==
- Fulbright Scholar (2005)
- Leloir Award for International Cooperation by Argentina Ministry of Science and Technology (2017)
- Elected Fellow of the American Physical Society (2017) ("For understanding of complex fluid dynamics, from thin films to granular flows")
- Excellence in Research Prize and Medal (NJIT) (2020)
