= Proteomes (journal) =

- Discipline: biochemistry, molecular biology
- Language: English
- Edited by: Jens R. Coorssen and Matthew P. Padula

Publication details
- History: 2013–present
- Publisher: MDPI
- Frequency: Quarterly
- Open access: Yes
- License: CC-BY

Standard abbreviations
- ISO 4: Proteomes

Indexing
- CODEN: PROTHC
- ISSN: 2227-7382

Links
- Journal homepage

Proteomes is a peer-reviewed open access scientific journal covering research in biochemistry and molecular biology, and focused on proteome analysis. It is published by MDPI and was established in 2013. The joint editor-in-chief are Jens R. Coorssen (Brock University) and Matthew P. Padula (University of Technology Sydney).

== Archiving and Indexing ==
The journal is covered by the following databases and archives:

- Emerging Sources Citation Index
- Scopus
- Index Medicus/MEDLINE/PubMed
- EBSCO databases
- DOAJ
- Other database
