= Sensors (disambiguation) =

Sensors are devices that measure physical quantities and convert them into signals which can be read by observers or by instruments.

Sensors may also refer to:

- Sensors (album), a 2007 progressive rock album
- Sensors (journal), a Swiss open access journal
- sysctl hw.sensors, an OpenBSD framework for hardware monitoring sensors
- lm_sensors, a Linux software for hardware monitoring sensors
- Image sensor, as used in digital cameras, camera modules, medical imaging equipment, night vision equipment such as thermal imaging devices, radar, sonar, and others

== See also ==
- List of sensors
- Sensor (disambiguation)
