= Smart Cities (journal) =

- Discipline: Urban studies, Electrical engineering, Computer science
- Language: English
- Edited by: Pierluigi Siano

Publication details
- History: 2018–present
- Publisher: MDPI (Switzerland)
- Frequency: Bimonthly
- Open access: Yes
- License: Creative Commons Attribution License
- Impact factor: 5.5 (2024)

Standard abbreviations
- ISO 4: Smart Cities

Indexing
- ISSN: 2624-6511

Links
- Journal homepage

Smart Cities is a peer-reviewed open-access scientific journal covering research on the science and technology of smart cities. It is published bimonthly by MDPI and was established in 2018. The Editor-in-Chief is Pierluigi Siano from the University of Salerno.

The journal provides an advanced forum for research on the design, implementation, and management of smart cities, including topics such as intelligent transportation systems, urban energy systems and smart grids, smart buildings and infrastructure, urban data analytics, Internet of Things (IoT) applications, governance and policy for smart cities, and social and economic aspects of urban digitalization. It publishes original research articles, reviews, and communications.

== Abstracting and indexing ==
The journal is indexed in several bibliographic databases, including:

- Science Citation Index Expanded (Clarivate)
- Scopus
- DOAJ
- ProQuest
- Inspec

According to the Journal Citation Reports, the journal has a 2024 impact factor of 5.5.
