= Molbank =

- Discipline: Chemistry
- Language: English

Publication details
- History: 1997–present
- Publisher: MDPI
- Frequency: Quarterly
- Open access: Yes

Standard abbreviations
- ISO 4: Molbank

Indexing
- ISSN: 1422-8599

Links
- Journal homepage

Molbank is a peer-reviewed, open access, scientific journal covering synthetic chemistry and natural product chemistry, established in 1997 as a section of Molecules and is published by MDPI. After 2001, the journal was published on its own, and become online-only in 2009.

The journal is focused on publishing short notes in a one-compound-per-paper format, on individual compounds containing experimental data records for individual molecules, which are not always publishable as such. Special attention is paid to a convincing characterization of new compounds which must be documented by appropriate supplementary material. In addition, depositing compound samples via the MolMall service is encouraged. Molbank was launched to preserve and exploit molecular diversity of both chemical information and chemical substances. The journal is indexed by CAS, DOAJ and Scopus.
