= Biosensors (journal) =

- Discipline: Biosensors, Analytical chemistry, Biotechnology
- Language: English

Publication details
- History: 2011–present
- Publisher: MDPI
- Frequency: Continuous
- Open access: Yes
- License: Creative Commons Attribution License
- Impact factor: 4.9 (2023)

Standard abbreviations
- ISO 4: Biosensors

Indexing
- ISSN: 2079-6374

Links
- Journal homepage

Biosensors is a peer-reviewed open-access scientific journal covering various aspects of biosensor technology, analytical chemistry, and biotechnology research. It is published by MDPI and was established in 2011.

The journal publishes research articles, reviews, and commentaries related to the development and application of biosensing technologies.

== Abstracting and indexing ==
The journal is abstracted and indexed in:

- DOAJ
- ProQuest databases
- PubMed
- Science Citation Index Expanded
- Scopus

According to the Journal Citation Reports, the journal has a 2023 impact factor of 4.9.
