= Kevin Knuth =

American astrophysicist (born 1965)

Kevin Hunter Knuth
- Born: 1965 (age 60–61); Fond du Lac, Wisconsin, US
- Education: University of Wisconsin–Oshkosh; Montana State University; University of Minnesota
- Scientific career
- Fields: Physics
- Workplaces: CUNY Graduate Center; Albert Einstein College of Medicine; NASA Ames Research Center; SUNY Albany
- Thesis: Dynamics of the human auditory cortex in response to periodic auditory stimulation (1995)
- Doctoral advisor: John H. Broadhurst
- Website: www.knuthlab.org

Kevin Hunter Knuth (born 1965) is a Professor of Physics at the University at Albany (SUNY). Knuth conducts research in information physics, foundations of quantum mechanics, and Bayesian analysis with applications towards various problems in physics. He also conducts research into UFOs.

== Education ==
Knuth was born in Fond du Lac, Wisconsin. He received a Bachelor of Science in physics and mathematics from the University of Wisconsin–Oshkosh in 1988, a Master of Science in physics from Montana State University in 1990, and a PhD in physics (with a minor in mathematics) from the University of Minnesota (1995), where he was supervised by John H. Broadhurst.

== Career ==
After receiving his doctorate, Knuth taught in the Department of Speech and Hearing Sciences of the Graduate Center, CUNY, the Departments of Otolaryngology and Neuroscience of the Albert Einstein College of Medicine, and the Department of Physiology and Biophysics of the Cornell University Medical Center. He also worked as a researcher at the Nathan Kline Institute for Psychiatric Research from 1999 to 2001 and at NASA's Ames Research Center from 2001 to 2005. It was reported by WAMC that Knuth's NASA work included "designing artificial intelligence algorithms for astrophysical data analysis" at the Intelligent Systems Division. In 2004, NASA Earth Science selected a project of Knuth's during his tenure with Ames at Moffett Federal Airfield to investigate, called Rapid Characterization of Causal Interactions among Climate/Weather System Variables: An Advanced Information-Theoretic Technique.

He became an assistant professor of physics at the University at Albany in 2005, was promoted to associate professor in 2009 and to professor in 2023. Vice identified Knuth's academic focus as machine learning and exoplanets. According to the Associated Press, Knuth has performed additional scientific research related to "cyberphysics and robotics and foundations of quantum theory".

He has been editor-in-chief of the MDPI journal Entropy since 2012. Knuth has presented at the Max Planck Institute for Plasma Physics in Garching, Germany, Vice reported.

== UFO research ==
In 2021, The Guardian identified Knuth as an expert in UFOs, writing that he is "among the UFO researchers who have shared their expertise with high school students." Knuth is regularly quoted in the media on the topic of UFOs. Space.com identified Knuth as an "active UAP researcher" in 2022. According to Knuth, his interests in UFOs began during his time at Montana State University (MSU). A nearby claim of cattle mutilation as well as professors telling him of the Malmstrom UFO incident were influences. Knuth attributed his beliefs on UFO matters to Robert Hastings.

The Associated Press highlighted that Knuth had written of his belief that UFOs were "worthy of serious scientific study", but recognized many dismissed the matter as pseudoscience. Texas Public Radio (TPR) identified a paper Knuth authored, Estimating Flight Characteristics of Anomalous Unidentified Aerial Vehicles, and that it "included case studies from 1951 to present day, which included sightings of objects near the USS Nimitz aircraft carrier in 2004." He serves as vice president of UAPx, a nonprofit organization that aims to conduct field research about UFOs, sometimes referred to as UAP, and is a research affiliate of The Galileo Project for the systematic scientific search for evidence of extraterrestrial technological artifacts at Harvard University.

TPR observed that Knuth was "disappointed there has not been more serious study done by scientists" on the matter of UFOs. According to TPR, Knuth believes the "most likely" explanation for UFOs is "to assume they're built by a government or an aerospace company", but that if so, it could require "multiple technological leapfrogs". The Associated Press reported that in 2021 Knuth would be working with the "U.S. Navy on a research vessel off the California coast" on UFO-related research. Leonard David in Space.com noted that Knuth believed scientific research related to UFOs was better decentralized in approach but sharing data, as "independent scientific studies."

== Media appearances ==
- Netflix's Encounters, (episode 3).
- National Geographic's UFOs: Investigating the Unknown, (season 2, episode 3).
