= Iqbal Mujtaba =

British academic and engineer

- Education: Bangladesh University of Engineering & Technology; Imperial College London
- Engineering career
- Discipline: Chemical Engineering
- Institutions: University of Bradford

Professor Iqbal Mujtaba is an academic and engineer who specializes in chemical engineering. He is currently serving as the associate dean at the University of Bradford.

As of March 2023, he has published over 390 technical papers in major engineering journals, with a focus on distillation, desalination, wastewater treatment, and refineries.

== Career ==
Following his PhD, Mujtaba became a research fellow at Process Systems Engineering, Imperial College, London. He remained at the Imperial College until 1994, when he joined the University of Bradford as a lecturer in Chemical Engineering.

In 2000, he became the secretary of IChemE Computer Aided Process Engineering Subject Group. He later held the position of chair at the subject group between 2015 and 2019. In 2001, he edited the book, Application of Neutral Networks and Other Learning Technologies in Process Engineering. In 2004, he published "Batch Distillation - Design and Operation" with World Scientific on the subject of batch distillation. He edited several books, "Composite Materials Technology: Neutral Network Applications (2009)", "The Water-Food-Energy Nexus: Processes, Technologies and Challenges (2017)," "Water Management: Social & Technological Perspectives (2018)." In 2020, he published "Wastewater Treatment by Reverse Osmosis Process," and then in 2022 published "Desalination Technology: Design and Operation."

Mujtaba works in an editorial capacity for numerous peer-reviewed and open access journals, including as an Associate Editor for South African Journal for Chemical Engineering, Editorial Board Member for Energies and Processes.

He recently became a fellow of both the Institution of Chemical Engineers and the Royal Academy of Engineering.

Mujtaba is a world leader in batch distillation. Much of Mujtaba's recent research has focused on three topic areas - water, energy and food.
