= CIMB (disambiguation) =

CIMB Group is a financial services provider in Malaysia.

CIMB may also refer to:

- Current Issues in Molecular Biology, an academic scientific periodical

== See also ==
- CIMB-FM, a radio station of Quebec, Canada
- CINB-FM, a radio station of New Brunswick, Canada
- cymb., an abbreviation for Cymbal
- SinB, a member of Korean girl group GFriend
