= Sensor (disambiguation) =

A sensor is a device that measures a physical quantity and converts it into a signal which can be read by an observer or by an instrument.

Sensor may also refer to:

- Image sensor, in digital cameras, medical imaging equipment, night vision equipment
- Nokia Sensor, a software package
- Sensor (manga), a 2018 manga series by Junji Ito
- Sensor (album), a 2003 album by Camouflage
- Sensor (character), a fictional character
- SENSOR-Pesticides, a surveillance program
- Sensors (journal), a Swiss open access journal

== See also ==
- Censer, any type of vessel made for burning incense
- Censor (disambiguation)
- Censure
- Senser, a UK band
- Sensors (disambiguation)
