= Biomass (journal) =

- Discipline: Biomass, bioenergy, renewable energy, biofuels, sustainability
- Language: English
- Edited by: Dimitris P. Makris

Publication details
- History: 2021–present
- Publisher: MDPI (Switzerland)
- Frequency: Bimonthly
- Open access: Yes
- License: Creative Commons Attribution License
- Impact factor: 6.1 (2025)

Standard abbreviations
- ISO 4: Biomass

Indexing
- ISSN: 2673-8783

Links
- Journal homepage

Biomass is a bimonthly peer-reviewed open-access scientific journal covering research on the production, conversion, utilization, and sustainability of biomass resources, including bioenergy, biofuels, bioproducts, and related technologies. It is published by MDPI and was established in 2021.

The journal publishes original research articles, review articles, communications, and other contributions related to biomass resources and their applications in renewable energy and the bioeconomy.

== Abstracting and indexing ==
The journal is abstracted and indexed in, for example:

- Directory of Open Access Journals
- EBSCO databases
- Scopus
- Web of Science

According to the Journal Citation Reports, the journal has a 2025 impact factor of 6.1.
