= Antibiotics (journal) =

- Discipline: Microbiology
- Language: English
- Edited by: Nicholas Dixon

Publication details
- History: 2012–present
- Publisher: MDPI
- Frequency: Continuous
- Open access: Yes
- License: Creative Commons Attribution License
- Impact factor: 4.8 (2022)

Standard abbreviations
- ISO 4: Antibiotics

Indexing
- ISSN: 2079-6382
- OCLC no.: 870683205

Links
- Journal homepage

Antibiotics is a peer-reviewed open-access scientific journal covering various aspects of antibiotics research. It is published by MDPI and was established in 2012. The editor-in-chief is Nicholas Dixon (University of Wollongong).

The journal publishes research articles, reviews, and commentaries related to antibiotics research, including biochemistry, microbiology, natural antibiotics, and prescribing sciences.

== Abstracting and indexing ==
The journal is abstracted and indexed, for example, in:

- DOAJ
- ProQuest databases
- CAB Abstracts
- Science Citation Index Expanded
- Scopus

According to the Journal Citation Reports, the journal has a 2022 impact factor of 4.8.
