= Dental and Medical Problems =

Medical journal

- Discipline: Dentistry
- Language: English
- Edited by: Mieszko Więckiewicz

Publication details
- Former names: Wrocławski Biuletyn Stomatologiczny, Wrocławska Stomatologia
- History: 1960–present
- Publisher: Wroclaw Medical University Press
- Frequency: Bimonthly
- Open access: Yes
- License: CC BY 3.0
- Impact factor: 3.9 (2024)

Standard abbreviations
- ISO 4: Dent. Med. Probl.

Indexing
- ISSN: 1644-387X (print); 2300-9020 (web)
- OCLC no.: 56362229

Links
- Journal homepage; Online archive

Dental and Medical Problems is a bimonthly open-access medical journal published by Wroclaw Medical University Press. The editor-in-chief of the journal is Mieszko Więckiewicz. The journal was established in 1960 as Wrocławski Biuletyn Stomatologiczny. In 1965, it was renamed Wrocławska Stomatologia, obtaining its current name in 2002.

== Abstracting and indexing ==
The journal is abstracted and indexed in Directory of Open Access Journals, Emerging Sources Citation Index, Index Medicus/MEDLINEPubMed, and Scopus. According to the 2025 Journal Citation Reports, the journal has an impact factor of 3.9.
