= Open access in Albania =

Albania currently has no Open Access policy. The Draft Law for Science, published in July 2023, mandates that all publicly (co-)funded research should be openly accessible and reusable. The law is currently in the consultation phase.

Scopus data from November 2023 show that out of a total of 4,043 publications by Albanian authors in Open Access, 1,918 are in Gold (47%) and 2,470 publications are in Green (61%). According to the COKI Open Access Dashboard, Albania ranks second in Europe with regard to the percentage of OA publications as part of the total scholarly output, at 71%. Given the low access to databases by Albanian institutions and the lack of institutional support to publish in OA (due to fees), these OA publications are an outcome of the international collaborations Albanian researchers have.

== Journals ==
As of August 2024, there are eight Albanian Open Access journals registered in the Directory of Open Access Journals:

- Academicus International Scientific Journal
- Albanian Journal of Trauma and Emergency Surgery
- Economicus
- Ingenious
- Jus & Justicia
- Medicus
- Prizren Social Science Journal
- POLIS

Furthermore, the following journals are Open Access:

- Albania Law Journal
- Albanian Journal of Mathematics
- Art Studies
- Beder University Journal of Educational Sciences
- CIT Review Journal
- Interdisciplinary Journal of Research and Development
- The Albanian Journal of Medical and Health Sciences
