= Polymers (journal) =

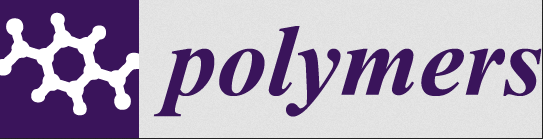
- Discipline: Chemistry
- Language: English
- Edited by: Alexander Böker

Publication details
- History: 2009-present
- Publisher: MDPI
- Frequency: Monthly
- Open access: Yes
- Impact factor: 5.0 (2022)

Standard abbreviations
- ISO 4: Polymers

Indexing
- CODEN: POLYCK
- ISSN: 2073-4360
- OCLC no.: 652357636

Links
- Journal homepage

Polymers is a peer-reviewed open access scientific journal covering polymer science. It was established in 2009 and is published monthly by MDPI. The editor-in-chief is Alexander Böker (Fraunhofer-Institute for Applied Polymer Research).

== Abstracting and indexing ==
The journal is abstracted and indexed in:

- Chemical Abstracts Service
- Current Contents
- Directory of Open Access Journals
- EBSCO databases
- Food Science and Technology Abstracts
- Inspec
- Ei Compendex
- Science Citation Index Expanded
- Scopus

According to the Journal Citation Reports, the journal has a 2022 impact factor of 5.0.
