= Viruses (journal) =

- Discipline: Virology
- Language: English
- Edited by: Eric O. Freed

Publication details
- History: 2009-present
- Publisher: MDPI
- Frequency: Monthly
- Open access: Yes
- Impact factor: 4.7 (2022)

Standard abbreviations
- ISO 4: Viruses

Indexing
- CODEN: VIRUBR
- ISSN: 1999-4915
- OCLC no.: 863091520

Links
- Journal homepage

Viruses is a monthly peer-reviewed open access scientific journal published by MDPI covering all aspects of virology. It was established in 2009. The editor-in-chief is Eric O. Freed (National Cancer Institute).

== Abstracting and indexing ==
The journal is abstracted and indexed in:

- Biological Abstracts
- BIOSIS Previews
- CAB Abstracts
- Chemical Abstracts
- EBSCOhost
- EMBASE
- Food Science and Technology Abstracts
- Global Health
- MEDLINE/ PubMed
- Science Citation Index Expanded
- Scopus

According to the Journal Citation Reports, the journal has a 2022 impact factor of 4.7, ranking it 15th out of 36 journals in the category "Virology".
