= Pharmaceutics (journal) =

- Discipline: Pharmaceutics
- Language: English
- Edited by: Yvonne Perrie

Publication details
- History: 2009–present
- Publisher: MDPI
- Frequency: Continuous
- Open access: Yes
- License: Creative Commons Attribution License
- Impact factor: 5.4 (2021)

Standard abbreviations
- ISO 4: Pharmaceutics

Indexing
- CODEN: PHARK5
- ISSN: 1999-4923
- OCLC no.: 646420993

Links
- Journal homepage

Pharmaceutics is a peer-reviewed open-access scientific journal that covers various areas of pharmaceutics research, including biopharmaceutics, nanomedicine, and pharmacodynamics. It is published by MDPI and was established in 2009. The editor-in-chief is Yvonne Perrie (University of Strathclyde).

The journal publishes original research articles, review articles including systematic reviews, and short communications.

== Abstracting and indexing ==
The journal is abstracted and indexed in:

- EBSCO databases
- ProQuest databases
- Science Citation Index Expanded
- Scopus

According to the Journal Citation Reports, the journal has a 2021 impact factor of 5.4.
