= Gels (journal) =

- Discipline: Materials science, Polymer science, Chemistry
- Language: English
- Edited by: Esmaiel Jabbari

Publication details
- History: 2015–present
- Publisher: MDPI (Switzerland)
- Frequency: Monthly
- Open access: Yes
- License: Creative Commons Attribution License
- Impact factor: 5.3 (2024)

Standard abbreviations
- ISO 4: Gels

Indexing
- ISSN: 2310-2861
- OCLC no.: 947073905

Links
- Journal homepage

Gels is a peer-reviewed open-access scientific journal publishing research on the science and technology of gels, including hydrogels, aerogels, organogels, and related soft matter systems. It is published monthly by MDPI and was established in 2015. The Editor-in-Chief is Esmaiel Jabbari from University of South Carolina.

The journal publishes original research articles, reviews, and communications on the preparation, characterization, and application of gel-based materials in fields such as biomedicine, energy, and environmental science.

== Abstracting and indexing ==
The journal is indexed in several bibliographic databases, including:

- Science Citation Index Expanded (Clarivate)
- Scopus
- DOAJ
- Materials Science & Engineering Collection (ProQuest)
- EBSCO

According to the Journal Citation Reports, the journal has a 2024 impact factor of 5.3.
