= Catalysts (journal) =

- Discipline: Catalysis, materials science
- Language: English
- Edited by: Keith Hohn

Publication details
- History: 2013–present
- Publisher: MDPI
- Frequency: Monthly
- Open access: Yes
- License: CC-BY 4.0
- Impact factor: 4.501 (2021)

Standard abbreviations
- ISO 4: Catalysts

Indexing
- CODEN: CATACJ
- ISSN: 2073-4344
- OCLC no.: 823822338

Links
- Journal homepage

Catalysts is a monthly peer-reviewed open-access scientific journal covering catalysts and catalyzed reactions. The journal was established in 2013 and is published by MDPI. The journal has a partnership with the Swiss Chemical Society. The editor-in-chief is Keith Hohn (Kansas State University).

== Abstracting and indexing ==
The journal is abstracted and indexed in:

- Chemical Abstracts Service
- Current Contents/Physical, Chemical & Earth Sciences
- EBSCO databases
- Inspec
- METADEX
- Polymer Library
- ProQuest databases
- Science Citation Index Expanded
- Scopus

According to the Journal Citation Reports, the journal has a 2020 impact factor of 4.146.
