= Current Oncology =

- Discipline: Oncology
- Language: English

Publication details
- History: 1994–present
- Publisher: MDPI
- Frequency: Bimonthly
- Impact factor: 3.109 (2021)

Standard abbreviations
- ISO 4: Curr. Oncol.

Indexing
- ISSN: 1198-0052 (print); 1718-7729 (web)
- OCLC no.: 819160414

Links
- Journal homepage; Online access; Online archive

Current Oncology is a bi-monthly peer-reviewed medical journal covering oncology. It was established in 1994 and was originally published quarterly by Multimed Inc., a company founded in 1980 by Lorne Cooper. Its founders intended it to be a forum in which Canadian oncologists could publish their work. The journal is now published bimonthly by MDPI. All issues published since December 2005 are available fully open access on the journal's website. According to the Journal Citation Reports, the journal has a 2020 impact factor of 3.677.
