= Polysaccharides (journal) =

- Discipline: Carbohydrate chemistry
- Language: English
- Edited by: Karin Stana Kleinschek

Publication details
- History: 2020–present
- Publisher: MDPI (Switzerland)
- Frequency: Quarterly
- Open access: Yes
- License: Creative Commons Attribution License
- Impact factor: 5.5 (2024)

Standard abbreviations
- ISO 4: Polysaccharides

Indexing
- ISSN: 2673-4176

Links
- Journal homepage

Polysaccharides is a peer-reviewed open-access scientific journal focusing on research related to polysaccharides and applications in fields such as medicine and tissue engineering. It is published quarterly by MDPI and was established in 2020. The founding and current Editor-in-Chief is Karin Stana Kleinschek.

The journal publishes original research articles, reviews, and short communications covering natural and synthetic polysaccharides, Glycobiology, agricultural science, pharmaceutical applications, and food science.

== Abstracting and indexing ==
The journal is indexed in several bibliographic databases, including:

- Biological Science Database (ProQuest)
- Academic Search Ultimate
- Natural Science Collection (ProQuest)
- Emerging Sources Citation Index
- Scopus

According to the Journal Citation Reports, the journal has a 2024 impact factor of 5.5.
