= Insects (journal) =

- Discipline: Entomology
- Language: English

Publication details
- History: 2010–present
- Publisher: MDPI
- Frequency: Monthly
- Open access: Yes
- Impact factor: 3.141 (2021)

Standard abbreviations
- ISO 4: Insects

Indexing
- ISSN: 2075-4450

Links
- Journal homepage

The Insects is a peer-reviewed open access scientific journal of entomology published monthly by MDPI since 2010. The editor-in-chief is Brian T. Forschler from (University of Georgia). The journal is affiliated with the American Association of Professional Apiculturists. According to the 2021 edition of the Journal Citation Reports, the journal has a 2020 impact factor of 2.769, ranking 18th out of 102 in 'Entomology'. CiteScore 2020 (Scopus): 2.3, which equals rank 59/153 in 'Insect Science'.

== Abstracting and indexing ==
The journal is abstracted and indexed in:

- AGORA
- AGRICOLA
- CABI
- Biological Abstracts
- BIOSIS Previews
- CAB Abstracts
- Current Contents
- DOAJ
- Genamics JournalSeek
- Journal Citation Reports
- Julkaisufoorumi Publication Forum (Federation of Finnish Learned Societies)
- Norwegian Register for Scientific Journals, Series and Publishers (NSD)
- United Nations Environment Programme
- PubMed
- Science Citation Index Expanded
- Scopus
- Web of Science
- Zoological Record

== Awards ==
The journal organizes the "Young Investigator Award" for 2018, aiming to promote the work of young scientists by publishing their work free of charge.
