= Maryam Tabrizian =

Canadian engineer

- Born: Rudsar, Gilan, Iran
- Occupation: Engineer
- Awards: Guggenheim Fellow (2010); Fellow of the Royal Society of Canada (2017)

Academic background
- Education: Ferdowsi University of Mashhad; Pierre and Marie Curie University; HEC Montréal

Academic work
- Discipline: Engineering
- Sub-discipline: Nanomedicine; regenerative medicine
- Institutions: McGill University

Maryam Tabrizian FRSC FCAHS is an Iranian-born Canadian engineer. A 2010 Guggenheim Fellow, she is Professor of the McGill University Department of Biomedical Engineering.

== Biography ==
Maryam Tabrizian was born in Rudsar, a city in Gilan province, Iran, and obtained her bachelor's degree in applied chemistry at Ferdowsi University of Mashhad in 1980. She later moved to Pierre and Marie Curie University, where she obtained her MSc in 1986 and, in a joint program with ESPCI Paris, her PhD in 1990. She later obtained her MBA from HEC Montréal in 1999. She later started working at McGill University, where became a professor at the Department of Biomedical Engineering and at the Faculty of Dentistry and was director of the Fonds de recherche du Québec - Nature et technologies's Centre for Biorecognition and Biosensors from 2002 until 2011.

Tabrizian specializes in nanomedicine and regenerative medicine. She was awarded a Guggenheim Fellowship in 2010, during which she researched cells' interactions with biomaterial and other cells with the teams of Ali Khademhosseini and Albert Sacco. In 2011, she became the editor-in-chief of the materials science journal Materials. In 2022, she became the first editor-in-chief of biomaterials journal Exploration of BioMat-X.

In the early-2010s, Tabrizian was elected a Fellow of Biomaterials Science and Engineering. She was elected a Fellow of the Royal Society of Canada in 2017. In October 2019, she was appointed Tier 1 Canada Research Chair in Regenerative Medicine and Nanomedicine. She won the Network for Oral and Bone Health Research's 2020-2021 CP Leblond Award. She is also a Fellow of the Canadian Academy of Health Sciences and an American Dental Education Association Leadership Institute Fellow.
