= Mathematics (journal) =

- Discipline: Mathematics
- Language: English
- Edited by: Francisco Chiclana

Publication details
- History: 2013–present
- Publisher: MDPI
- Frequency: Semi-monthly
- Open access: Yes
- License: CC BY
- Impact factor: 2.3 (2023)

Standard abbreviations
- ISO 4: Mathematics

Indexing
- ISSN: 2227-7390
- OCLC no.: 853472879

Links
- Journal homepage

Mathematics is a semi-monthly peer-reviewed open-access scientific journal that covers all aspects of pure mathematics and applied mathematics. It publishes theoretical and experimental research articles, short communications, and reviews. It was established in 2013 and is published by MDPI. The editor-in-chief is Francisco Chiclana (De Montfort University).

== Abstracting and indexing ==
The journal is abstracted and indexed in:

- Current Contents/Physical, Chemical & Earth Sciences
- EBSCO databases
- Metadex
- ProQuest databases
- Science Citation Index Expanded
- Scopus
- zbMATH Open (from 2013 to 2018)

According to the Journal Citation Reports, the journal has a 2023 impact factor of 2.3, ranking it 21st out of 489 journals in the category "Mathematics".
