= Electronics (journal) =

- Discipline: Electronics
- Language: English
- Edited by: Flavio Canavero

Publication details
- History: 2012–present
- Publisher: MDPI
- Impact factor: 2.690 (2021)

Standard abbreviations
- ISO 4: Electronics

Indexing
- ISSN: 2079-9292

Links
- Journal homepage; Online archive

Electronics is a peer-reviewed, scientific journal that covers the study of electronics, including the design, development, and application of electronic devices, systems, and circuits.

The journal is published by MDPI and was established in 2012. The editor-in-chief is Flavio Canavero 'Politecnico di Torino).

The journal covers a wide range of topics related to electronics, including: electronic devices, electronic materials, electronic circuits, electronic systems, communication electronics, power electronics, and biomedical electronics. The journal also includes articles on the application of electronics in various fields, such as consumer electronics, industrial electronics, automotive electronics, and military electronics.

The journal publishes original research articles, review articles, and short communications.

== Abstracting and indexing ==
- EBSCO databases
- ProQuest databases
- Scopus

According to the Journal Citation Reports, the journal has a 2021 impact factor of 2.690.
