= Molecules (journal) =

Academic chemistry journal published by MDPI

- Discipline: Chemistry
- Language: English
- Edited by: Thomas J. Schmidt

Publication details
- History: 1996–present
- Publisher: MDPI
- Frequency: Semi-monthly
- Open access: Yes
- License: CC BY
- Impact factor: 4.6 (2024)

Standard abbreviations
- ISO 4: Molecules

Indexing
- CODEN: MOLEFW
- ISSN: 1420-3049
- OCLC no.: 641147188

Links
- Journal homepage

Molecules is a peer-reviewed open access scientific journal that focuses on all aspects of chemistry and materials science. It was established in March 1996 and is published semi-monthly by MDPI. From 1997 to 2001, Molbank was published as a section of the journal, before splitting into its own journal. Since 2023, Thomas J. Schmidt (University of Münster) holds the position of editor-in-chief.

The journal was initially published by Springer Science+Business Media. In December 1996, Shu-Kun Lin resigned as editor and relaunched the journal with Molecular Diversity Preservation International, which is now renamed as Multidisciplinary Digital Publishing Institute (MDPI). Springer initially sued over naming rights, but eventually dropped the suit.

== Abstracting and indexing ==
The journal is abstracted and indexed in:

- Chemical Abstracts Service
- Current Contents
- EBSCO databases
- Embase
- Food Science and Technology Abstracts
- Index Medicus/MEDLINE/PubMed
- Inspec
- Reaxys
- Science Citation Index Expanded
- Scopus

According to the Journal Citation Reports, the journal has a 2024 impact factor of 4.6.
