= Materials (journal) =

- Discipline: Materials science, engineering
- Language: English
- Edited by: Maryam Tabrizian

Publication details
- History: 2008-present
- Publisher: MDPI
- Frequency: Semi-monthly
- Open access: Yes
- License: CC BY
- Impact factor: 3.748 (2021)

Standard abbreviations
- ISO 4: Materials
- NLM: Materials (Basel)

Indexing
- CODEN: MATEG9
- ISSN: 1996-1944
- OCLC no.: 405940410

Links
- Journal homepage

Materials is a semi-monthly peer-reviewed open access scientific journal covering materials science and engineering. It was established in 2008 and is published by MDPI. The editor-in-chief is Maryam Tabrizian (McGill University). The journal publishes reviews, regular research papers, short communications, and book reviews. There are currently hundreds of calls for submissions to special issues, a fact that has led to serious concerns.

== Abstracting and indexing ==
The journal is abstracted and indexed in:

- CAB Abstracts
- Chemical Abstracts Service
- Current Contents/Engineering, Computing & Technology
- EBSCO databases
- Ei Compendex
- Inspec
- ProQuest databases
- Science Citation Index Expanded
- Scopus

According to the Journal Citation Reports, the journal has a 2021 impact factor of 3.748.
