= Marine Drugs =

- Discipline: Pharmacology, Organic chemistry
- Language: English
- Edited by: Bill Baker

Publication details
- History: 2003-present
- Publisher: MDPI
- Frequency: Monthly
- Open access: Yes
- Impact factor: 5.118 (2020)

Standard abbreviations
- ISO 4: Mar. Drugs

Indexing
- ISSN: 1660-3397

Links
- Journal homepage

Marine Drugs is a peer-reviewed open-access medical journal publishing reviews and regular research papers on the research, development, and production of therapeutic agents from marine natural products. It is published by MDPI and was established in 2003. The editor-in-chief is Prof. Bill Baker.

== Abstracting and indexing ==
The journal is abstracted and indexed in:

- AGORA
- Biochemistry & Biophysics Citation Index
- BIOSIS Previews
- CAB Abstracts
- CSA Illumina
- Chemical Abstracts
- EBSCOhost
- EMBASE
- Medline/PubMed
- Science Citation Index Expanded
- Scopus

According to the Journal Citation Reports, the journal has a 2017 impact factor of 4.379.
