= Nanomaterials (journal) =

- Discipline: Nanomaterials
- Language: English

Publication details
- Publisher: MDPI
- Impact factor: 5.3 (2022)

Standard abbreviations
- ISO 4: Nanomaterials

Indexing
- ISSN: 2079-4991

Links
- Journal homepage; Online archive

Nanomaterials is an interdisciplinary scientific journal that covers all aspects of nanomaterials. The journal publishes theoretical and experimental research articles and studies about synthesis and use of nanomaterials.

It was founded in 2010. The journal is published by MDPI, as of 2022 editor in chief is Shirley Chiang, an American microscopist from University of California, Davis, the Department of Physics and Astronomy.

== Abstracting and indexing ==
The journal is abstracted and indexed in:

- DOAJ
- EBSCO
- Scopus
- Science Citation Index Expanded

According to the Journal Citation Reports, the journal has a 2022 impact factor of 5.3.
