= Applied Sciences (journal) =

Scientific journal

- Discipline: Applied sciences
- Language: English
- Edited by: Takayoshi Kobayashi

Publication details
- History: 2011–present
- Publisher: MDPI
- Frequency: 24/year
- Open access: Yes
- License: Creative Commons Attribution
- Impact factor: 2.838 (2021)

Standard abbreviations
- ISO 4: Appl. Sci.

Indexing
- CODEN: ASPCC7
- ISSN: 2076-3417
- OCLC no.: 828808191

Links
- Journal homepage

Applied Sciences is a semi-monthly peer-reviewed open-access scientific journal covering all aspects of applied physics, applied chemistry, applied biology, and engineering, environmental, and earth sciences. It was established in 2011 and is published by MDPI. The editor-in-chief is Takayoshi Kobayashi (University of Electro-Communications).

== Abstracting and indexing ==
The journal is abstracted and indexed in:

- Current Contents/Engineering, Computing & Technology
- Current Contents/Physical, Chemical & Earth Sciences
- EBSCO
- Inspec
- ProQuest
- Science Citation Index Expanded
- Scopus

According to the Journal Citation Reports, the journal has a 2020 impact factor of 2.679.
