= Brown Instrument Company =

Coordinates: 40°01′17″N 75°09′34″W

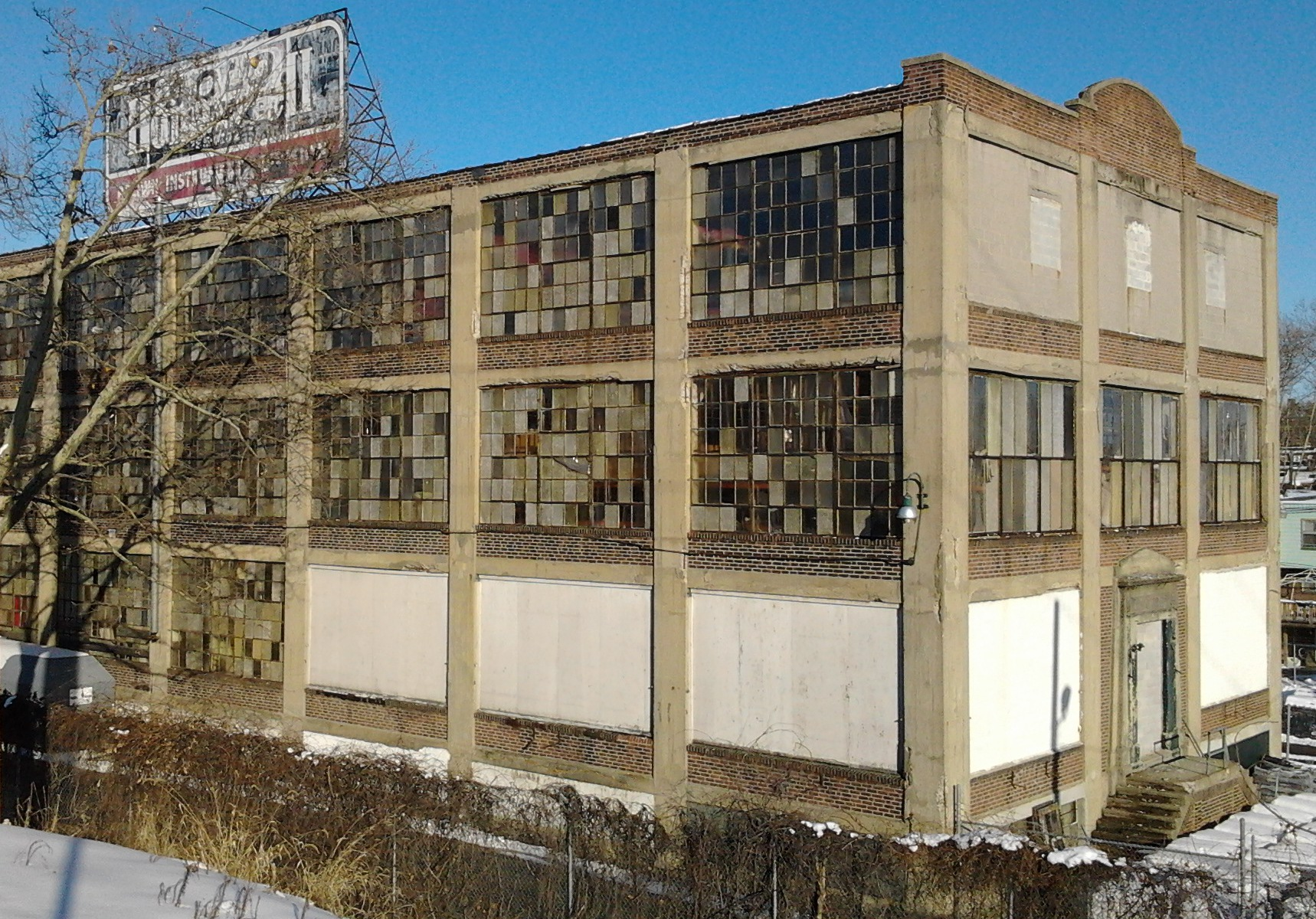
Abandoned Brown Instrument factory near Fern Rock Transportation Center, Philadelphia, Pennsylvania, in 2011. Note faded "Honeywell – Brown Instrument Division" sign.

Brown Instrument Company was a U.S. firm known for high-quality instruments (such as pyrometers, thermometers, hygrometers, tachometers, pressure gauges, flow meters, ammeters, and voltmeters) and industrial controls.

The company was founded in 1857 in Philadelphia by Edward Brown, inventor of the first pyrometer of American design. In 1934, the firm became a division of Honeywell.

The company was a large employer in North Philadelphia during most of the 20th century. A large brick factory building across Windrim Avenue from Wayne Junction, currently Extra Space Storage, was a principal Brown Instrument Company building. A 1921 catalog mentions laboratories here. The Wayne Avenue façade still has "Brown Instrument Co" relieved into the concrete.

A Google Book search for "Brown Instrument" "Wayne Ave" shows multiple addresses for the company on the 4400 and 4500 blocks of Wayne Ave, which straddle Wayne Junction. Another search result from 1915 mentions 311 Walnut St.

Across the regional rail tracks from Fern Rock Transportation Center there is another old factory building topped by a sign marked "Honeywell – Brown Instrument Division".

The firm later moved to Fort Washington, Pennsylvania. Honeywell's automation and control businesses still have a campus there, although the Brown Instrument name has been retired.

== Image gallery ==
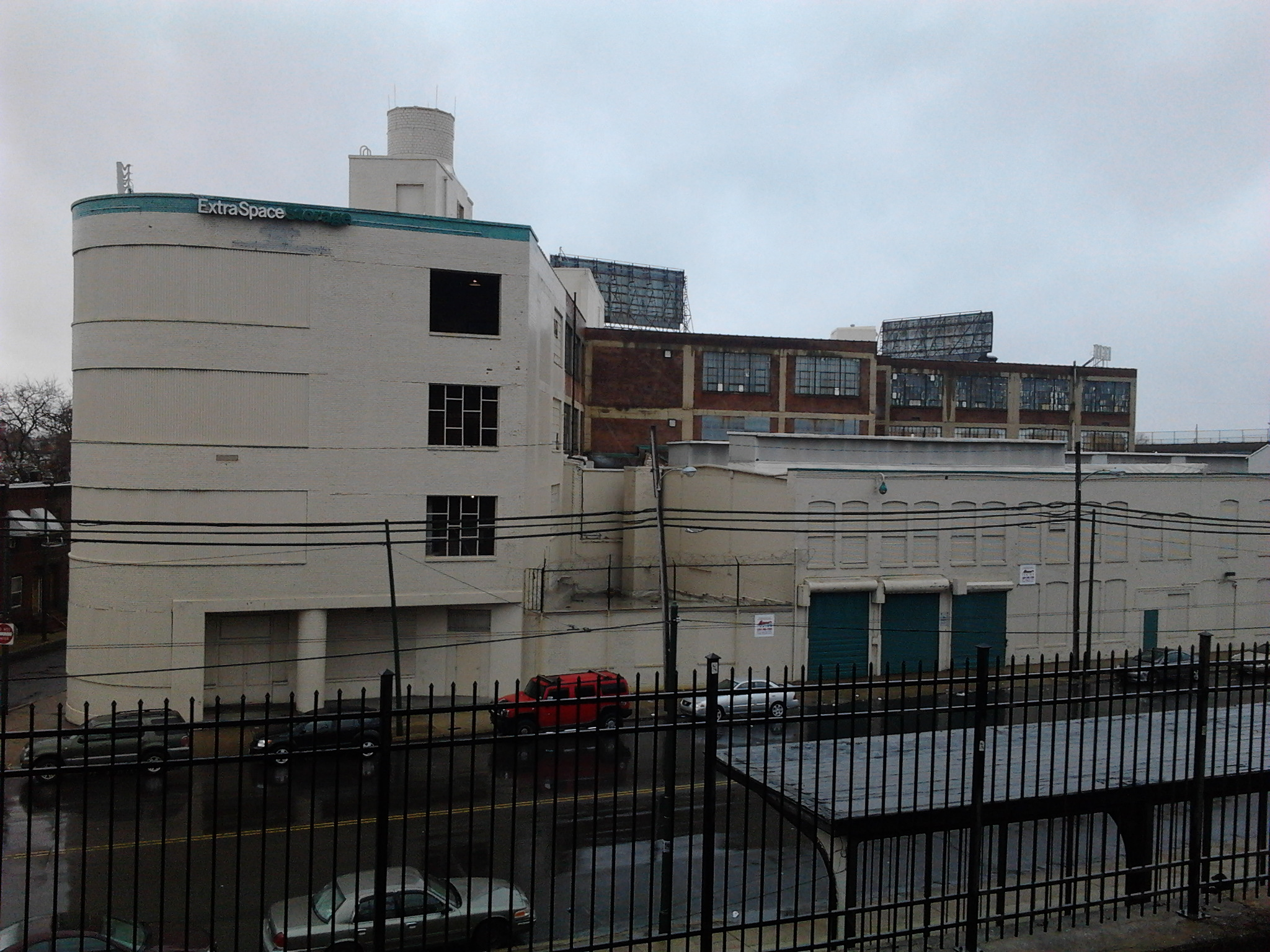
Brown Instrument factory near Wayne Junction, Philadelphia, Pennsylvania, in 2011, repurposed as a self-storage company.

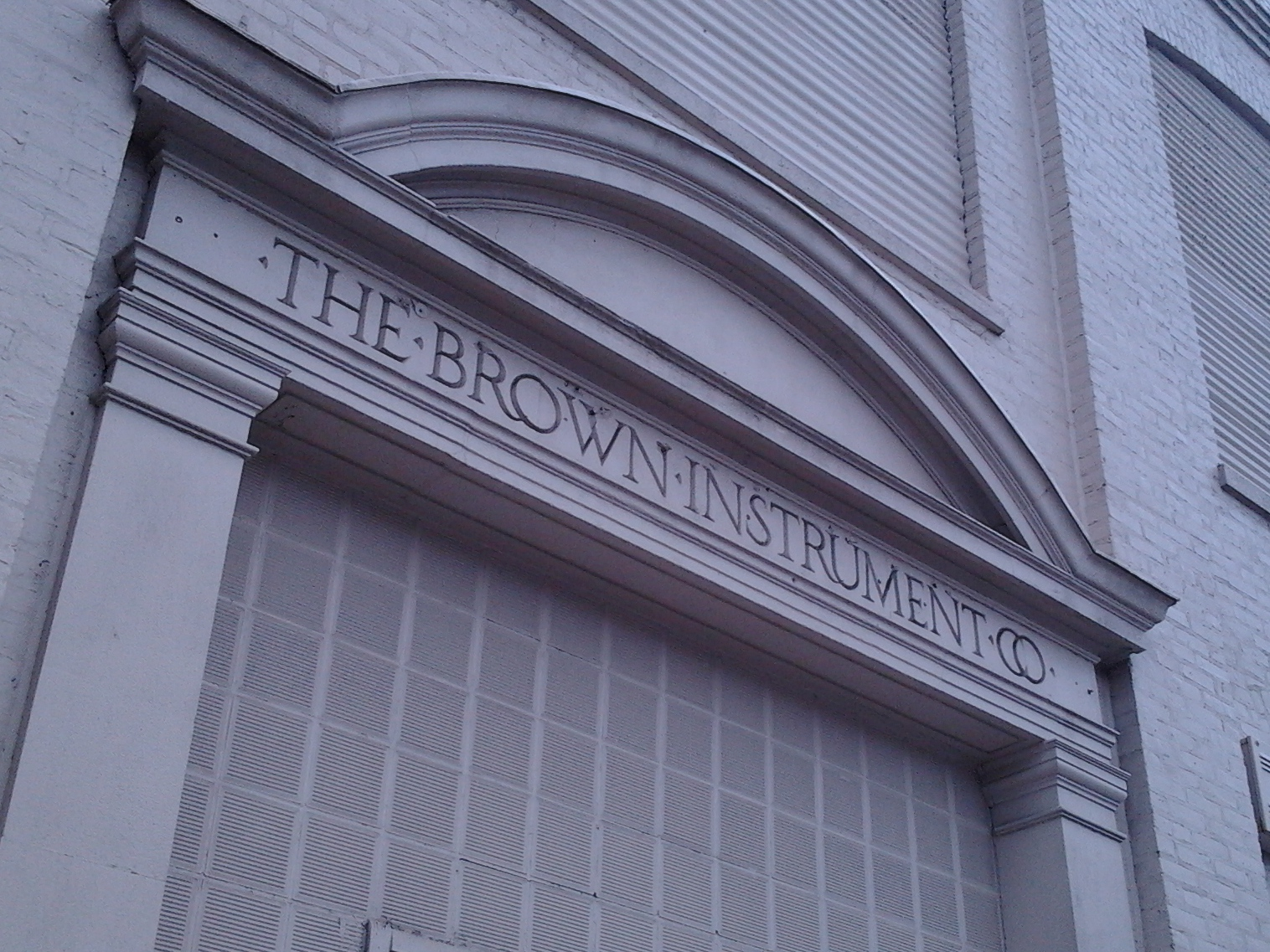
Wayne Avenue façade with relief of "The Brown Instrument Company" in stone.

== Bibliography ==
- Licht, Walter (1992), Getting Work: Philadelphia, 1840–1950, Cambridge, Massachusetts, USA: Harvard University Press, ISBN 978-0-8122-1719-3, LCCN 91035021
- ASME (1921), Condensed Catalogues of Mechanical Equipment, New York: ASME
- Brown Instrument Company (1919), Brown Instrument Company Catalog.
