= Biology: The Unity and Diversity of Life =

Textbook

Biology: The Unity and Diversity of Life is an introductory textbook of biology, for students. The fifteenth edition was published in 2019, by Cengage Learning. It was compiled by Cecie Starr and Ralph Taggart with pictures and illustrations by Lisa Starr. Its contents include concepts in molecular biology and biochemistry, genetics, biotechnology, reproduction and embryonic development, anatomy and physiology of plants and animals, evolution, taxonomy, and ecology.
