= Biologicals =

- Discipline: Biotechnology
- Language: English
- Edited by: Norman Baylor

Publication details
- Former name: Journal of Biological Standardization
- History: 1973−present
- Publisher: Elsevier
- Frequency: Quarterly
- Impact factor: 1.5 (2024)

Standard abbreviations
- ISO 4: Biologicals

Indexing
- ISSN: 1095-8320

Links
- Journal homepage; Online archive

Biologicals is a quarterly peer-reviewed scientific journal and the official journal of the International Alliance for Biological Standardization. It focuses on regulatory sciences used in the development and evaluation of human and veterinary biological medicines: vaccines, blood components & plasma-derived products, cellular, tissue and gene therapy products, allergenic extracts, monoclonal antibodies, toxins and toxoids. The journal publishes information on regulatory science as well as original research reports, short papers, review articles, and special issues to advance regulatory aspects of human and veterinary biological substances used in medicine

== Abstracting and indexing ==
The journal is abstracted and indexed in Abstracts on Hygiene and Communicable Diseases, BIOSIS, Biological Abstracts, Chemical Abstracts, Current Contents/Life Sciences, EMBASE, MEDLINE, Science Citation Index Expanded, and Scopus.
