= Julkaisufoorumi =

Classification scientific publication channels in Finland

JUFO portal
- Native name: Julkaisufoorumi
- Website type: Research information system
- Available in: Finnish; Swedish; English
- Country of origin: Finland
- Creator: Federation of Finnish Learned Societies
- Website: jfp.csc.fi/jufoportal
- Launched: 2010; 16 years ago
- Current status: Active

The JUFO Publication Forum, known as Julkaisufoorumi in Finnish, is the national research classification system of Finland for scientific journals, book series, conferences and book publishers that supports the quality assessment of research output. It started operating in 2010, and it is maintained by the Federation of Finnish Learned Societies.

Since 2015, Finland's Ministry of Education and Culture use the Publication Forum as a quality indicator of the research output produced by universities, which affects their public funding criteria.

The index divides journals and publishers considered to meet academic quality criteria into four levels. Level 1 includes publications that meet standards for peer-review and have an editorial board of experts of the discipline. Most publication outlets are at Level 1, which is the basic level. Levels 2 and 3 are awarded to a limited number of publication channels deemed to have the highest level of impact. Expert panels evaluate level 2 and 3 journals every four years. The publication outlets that do not meet all of the Level 1 criteria are marked as Level 0.

== See also ==
- Journal ranking by country
- Education in Finland
- Academic ranks in Finland
