= Processes (journal) =

- Discipline: Engineering
- Language: English
- Edited by: Giancarlo Cravotto

Publication details
- History: 2013–present
- Publisher: MDPI
- Frequency: Monthly
- Open access: Yes
- License: CC BY
- Impact factor: 3.5 (2022)

Standard abbreviations
- ISO 4: Processes

Indexing
- CODEN: PROCCO
- ISSN: 2227-9717
- OCLC no.: 854735135

Links
- Journal homepage; Online access

Processes is a monthly peer-reviewed open-access scientific journal covering process/systems related research in chemistry, biology, materials, and allied engineering fields. It was established in 2013 and is published by MDPI. The journal publishes regular research papers, communications, letters, short notes, and reviews. The founding editor-in-chief was Michael A. Henson (University of Massachusetts Amherst), who was succeeded in 2020 by Giancarlo Cravotto (University of Turin).

In September 2021 the journal was among the initial 13 journals included in the official Norwegian list of possibly predatory journals, known as level X.

== Abstracting and indexing ==
The journal is abstracted and indexed in:

- Chemical Abstracts Service
- Current Contents/Engineering, Computing & Technology
- Inspec
- Science Citation Index Expanded
- Scopus

According to the Journal Citation Reports, the journal has a 2022 impact factor of 3.5.
