= International Journal of Environmental Research and Public Health =

Journal

- Discipline: Health care, public health
- Language: English
- Edited by: Paul B. Tchounwou

Publication details
- History: 2004–present
- Publisher: MDPI
- Frequency: Semi-monthly
- Open access: Yes
- License: CC BY

Standard abbreviations
- ISO 4: Int. J. Environ. Res. Public Health

Indexing
- CODEN: IJERGQ
- ISSN: 1661-7827 (print); 1660-4601 (web)
- OCLC no.: 746935599

Links
- Journal homepage

The International Journal of Environmental Research and Public Health is a peer-reviewed open access scientific journal that was established in 2004 and is published by MDPI. The editor-in-chief is Paul B. Tchounwou. The journal covers all aspects of environmental health sciences and public health.

== Abstracting and indexing ==
The journal is abstracted and indexed in:

- Aquatic Sciences & Fisheries Abstracts
- CAB Abstracts
- Chemical Abstracts Service
- Embase
- Food Science & Technology Abstracts
- GEOBASE
- Index Medicus/MEDLINE/PubMed
- ProQuest databases
- Science Citation Index Expanded (until February 2023)
- Scopus

According to the Journal Citation Reports the journal had a 2021 impact factor of 4.614,. However, in February 2023, Clarivate delisted the journal in its main citation indexes (Science Citation Index Expanded and Social Sciences Citation Index), citing "publications that were deemed outside the scope of the journal". A delisted journal does not receive rank metrics such as a Clarivate journal impact factor.

== See also ==
- 5G misinformation
