= Sustainability (journal) =

- Discipline: Sustainability studies
- Language: English
- Edited by: Marc Rosen

Publication details
- History: 2009-present
- Publisher: MDPI
- Frequency: Semi-monthly
- Open access: Yes
- License: CC-BY 4.0
- Impact factor: 3.3 (2024)

Standard abbreviations
- ISO 4: Sustainability

Indexing
- CODEN: SUSTDE
- ISSN: 2071-1050
- OCLC no.: 320965599

Links
- Journal homepage

Sustainability is a peer-reviewed open-access academic journal published by MDPI. It covers all aspects of sustainability studies. In September 2021 the journal was among the initial 13 journals included in the official Norwegian list of possibly predatory journals, known as level X. In 2022 the Norwegian national publication committee and Finnish Publication Forum determined that Sustainability is not an academic journal and removed it from the register of approved journals starting from 2023. In 2023, Scopus re-evaluated whether to index Sustainability, and concluded that the journal "meets Scopus's content selection standards."

== Abstracting and indexing ==
This journal is abstracted and indexed in:

- CAB Abstracts
- Current Contents/Agriculture, Biology & Environmental Sciences
- Current Contents/Social and Behavioral Sciences
- EBSCO databases
- Food Science & Technology Abstracts
- GEOBASE
- Inspec
- ProQuest databases
- Science Citation Index Expanded
- Scopus
- Social Sciences Citation Index

According to the Journal Citation Reports, the journal has a 2024 impact factor of 3.3.
