= Biology (journal) =

- Discipline: Biology
- Language: English
- Edited by: Chris O'Callaghan

Publication details
- History: 2012-present
- Publisher: MDPI
- Frequency: Quarterly
- Open access: Yes
- License: Creative Commons Attribution
- Impact factor: 5.168 (2021)

Standard abbreviations
- ISO 4: Biology

Indexing
- CODEN: BBSIBX
- ISSN: 2079-7737
- OCLC no.: 830988802

Links
- Journal homepage

Biology is a quarterly, peer-reviewed, open access, scientific journal covering research on all aspects of biology. It was established in 2012 and is published by MDPI. The editor-in-chief is Chris O'Callaghan (University of Oxford). The journal publishes reviews, research papers, and communications.

Biology publishes reviews, research papers and communications in all areas of biology and at the interface of related disciplines. Its aim is to encourage scientists to publish their experimental and theoretical results in as much detail as possible.

This journal covers all topics related to Biology. Research fields of interest include but are not limited to:

- bacteriology
- biochemistry
- biodiversity
- bioethics

== Abstracting and indexing ==
The journal is abstracted and indexed in:

- Chemical Abstracts
- AGRICOLA
- EMBASE
- Science Citation Index Expanded
- Scopus
- The Zoological Record
