= Daniela Jacob =

German climatologist

- Born: 20 June 1961
- Education: Technical University of Darmstadt; University of Hamburg
- Scientific career
- Fields: Climate scientist

Daniela Jacob (born 20 June 1961) is a German climate scientist. She heads the Climate Service Center Germany (GERICS) and is a visiting professor at the Leuphana University of Lüneburg.

== Biography ==
Jacob studied meteorology from 1980 to 1986 at the Technical University of Darmstadt and received her doctorate in 1991 from the University of Hamburg.

She is married and has one daughter.

== Work ==
Jacob's research focuses on regional climate modeling and the water cycle.

Jacob was one of the lead authors of the IPCC Fifth Assessment Report and was a coordinating lead author of the Special Report on Global Warming of 1.5 °C (2018).

Jacob is the editor-in-chief and co-founder of Elsevier journal Climate Services. She is also a coordinator, along with Eleni Katragkou and Stefan Sobolowski, of EURO-CORDEX, a scientific community for European regional climate modeling.

== Selected publications ==
- Jacob, Daniela (16 November 2022). "Paris lebt". Die Zeit (in German).
- Jacob, Daniela; Bärring, Lars; Christensen, Ole Bøssing; Christensen, Jens Hesselbjerg; de Castro, Manuel; Déqué, Michel; Giorgi, Filippo; Hagemann, Stefan; Hirschi, Martin; Jones, Richard; Kjellström, Erik; Lenderink, Geert; Rockel, Burkhardt; Sánchez, Enrique; Schär, Christoph; Seneviratne, Sonia I.; Somot, Samuel; van Ulden, Aad; van den Hurk, Bart (17 March 2007). "An inter-comparison of regional climate models for Europe: model performance in present-day climate". Climatic Change. 81 (S1). Springer Science and Business Media LLC: 31–52. Bibcode:2007ClCh...81S..31J. doi:10.1007/s10584-006-9213-4. ISSN 0165-0009. S2CID 153768889.
