= Insectoid =

An insectoid is an insect-like or arachnid-like creature.

Insectoid may refer to:

- Insectoid robot
- Insectoids in science fiction and fantasy
