= International Journal of Molecular Sciences =

- Discipline: Molecular physics, chemistry, biochemistry, molecular biology
- Language: English
- Edited by: Maurizio Battino

Publication details
- History: 2000–present
- Publisher: MDPI
- Frequency: Monthly
- Open access: Yes
- Impact factor: 4.9 (2023)

Standard abbreviations
- ISO 4: Int. J. Mol. Sci.

Indexing
- ISSN: 1422-0067

Links
- Journal homepage

The International Journal of Molecular Sciences is a peer-reviewed open access scientific journal covering research in chemistry, molecular physics, and molecular biology. It is published by MDPI and was established in 2000. The journal is considered one of MDPI's flagship publications.

The editor-in-chief is Maurizio Battino (Marche Polytechnic University). More than 1,000 people are on the journal's editorial board.

== Special issues ==
In 2019, this journal published 500 special issues. According to Jack Grove in Inside Higher Ed, it planned 3,514 "special issues with a closing date in 2023" – nearly 10 per day.

== Abstracting and indexing ==
The journal is abstracted and indexed in:

- AGORA
- CAB Abstracts
- Chemical Abstracts
- Current Contents/Physical, Chemical & Earth Sciences
- EBSCO databases
- EMBASE
- Food Science and Technology Abstracts
- Global Health
- HINARI
- Index Medicus/MEDLINE/PubMed
- Polymer Library
- Science Citation Index Expanded
- Scopus

According to the Journal Citation Reports, the journal has a 2023 impact factor of 4.9.
