= Insecta (board game) =

Board game

Cover of 1st edition, 1992

Insecta is a cooperative board game that was published by Sierra Madre Games and Fat Messiah Games in 1992.

== Description ==
Insecta is a game of insect combat for 2–7 players. Each player designs a mutant insect by choosing various body parts: a head, front legs, rear legs, appendages and a tail. Each different body part has advantages and disadvantages. For example, wings allow flight but can't be used in tunnels. The player must also choose how much Instinct to give their insect (from 1–10), and how much Dexterity (also from 1–10). At the start of the game, Instinct and Desterity must add up to 12.

The resultant insects start life in The Hive. The object of the game is for the players' insects to work as a team to escape from Hive by defeating guardians such as a black widow spider, a praying mantis, or a honey bee.

=== Components ===
The game comes with:

- a paper hex grid map of the Hive
- cardstock sheets of insect parts and enemy insect cards
- reference cards
- plastic bugs

== Publication history ==
Insecta was designed by Philip Eklund, and published by Sierra Madre Games and Fat Messiah Games in 1992. A second edition was released in 1995, and this was followed by three expansions:

- Insecta: Rainforest (1997)
- Insecta: Trilobite (1998)
- Insecta: Desert Hive (2000)

== Reviews ==
In the September 1996 edition of Dragon (#233), Rick Swan reviewed the second edition and liked it, saying, "Not only does Insecta reward you for dousing your enemies with pheromones, it's the only game I've seen that uses a life-size rubber cockroach as a playing piece."
