= Journal of Clinical Medicine =

- Discipline: Medicine
- Language: English

Publication details
- History: 2012–present
- Publisher: MDPI
- Impact factor: 4.964 (2021)

Standard abbreviations
- ISO 4: J. Clin. Med.

Indexing
- ISSN: 2077-0383

Links
- Journal homepage; Online archive

Journal of Clinical Medicine is a medical journal that covers clinical and pre-clinical research. Topics of interest include cardiology, gastroenterology & hepatopancreatobiliary medicine, clinical neurology etc. The journal is published by MDPI.

== Abstracting and indexing ==
The journal is abstracted and indexed in:

- CAPlus / SciFinder
- CNKI
- EBSCO
- Web of Science

According to the Journal Citation Reports, the journal has a 2021 impact factor of 4.964.
