= Current Issues in Molecular Biology =

- Discipline: Molecular biology, microbiology
- Language: English

Publication details
- History: 1999–present
- Publisher: MDPI
- Open access: Open access journal
- Impact factor: 3.1 (2022)

Standard abbreviations
- ISO 4: Curr. Issues Mol. Biol.

Indexing
- CODEN: CMBIF6
- ISSN: 1467-3037 (print); 1467-3045 (web)
- LCCN: 00244539
- OCLC no.: 782078027
- Current Issues in Intestinal Microbiology
- ISSN: 1466-531X

Links
- Journal homepage

Current Issues in Molecular Biology is a peer-reviewed open access scientific journal publishing review articles and minireviews in all areas of molecular biology and molecular microbiology. According to the Journal Citation Reports, the journal has a 2022 impact factor of 3.1. It was originally published by Caister Academic Press when it was established in 1999, but has been published by MDPI since 2021.
