= Entropy (journal) =

- Discipline: Physics, chemistry
- Language: English
- Edited by: Kevin H. Knuth

Publication details
- History: 1999–present
- Publisher: MDPI
- Frequency: Monthly
- Open access: Yes
- Impact factor: 2.1 (2023)

Standard abbreviations
- ISO 4: Entropy (Basel)

Indexing
- CODEN: ENTRFG
- ISSN: 1099-4300
- LCCN: 2004209495
- OCLC no.: 56203928

Links
- Journal homepage

Entropy is a monthly open access scientific journal covering research on all aspects of entropy and information theory. It was established in 1999 and is published by MDPI. The journal occasionally publishes special issues compiled by guest editors. The editor-in-chief is Kevin H. Knuth (University at Albany, SUNY).

== Sections ==
Entropy consists of eight sections:

- Thermodynamics Section
- Statistical Mechanics
- Information Theory
- Quantum Information
- Complexity
- Astrophysics and Cosmology
- Entropy Reviews
- Entropy and Biology

== Abstracting and indexing ==
The journal is abstracted and indexed in:

- Chemical Abstracts Service
- Current Contents/Physical, Chemical & Earth Sciences
- Inspec
- MathSciNet
- Science Citation Index Expanded
- Scopus
- Zentralblatt MATH

According to the Journal Citation Reports, the journal has a 2023 impact factor of 2.1.

== 2013 Paper on glyphosate ==
In 2013, Entropy published a review paper saying glyphosate may be the most important factor in the development of obesity, depression, attention deficit hyperactivity disorder, autism, Alzheimer's disease, Parkinson's disease, multiple sclerosis, cancer, and infertility. The paper does not contain any primary research results. It was criticized as pseudo-science by the science magazine Discover and Jeffrey Beall, founder of Beall's List of predatory open-access publishers, said "Will MDPI publish anything for money?". Beall removed MDPI from his list of predatory publishers in October 2015.

In response to the controversy, the editors of Entropy added an "Expression of Concern" to the article's frontmatter. In 2017 researchers Robin Mesnage and Michael N. Antoniou, both of whom are working to limit the use of glyphosate, said that "although evidence exists that glyphosate-based herbicides are toxic below regulatory set safety limits, the arguments of [authors] Samsel and Seneff largely serve to distract rather than to give a rational direction."
