= Acta Odontologica Scandinavica =

- Discipline: Dentistry
- Language: English
- Edited by: Peter Holbrook

Publication details
- History: 1939–present
- Publisher: Talyor and Francis Group
- Frequency: Bimonthly
- Impact factor: 2.232 (2021)

Standard abbreviations
- ISO 4: Acta Odontol. Scand.

Indexing
- CODEN: AOSCAQ
- ISSN: 0001-6357 (print); 1502-3850 (web)
- OCLC no.: 01460946

Links
- Journal homepage; Online access; Online archive

Acta Odontologica Scandinavica is a peer-reviewed medical journal that covers dental research. The journal is published by Taylor and Francis Group and is sponsored by the Dental Associations and Dental Schools in Denmark, Finland, Iceland, Norway, and Sweden, with editorial responsibility alternating among these countries. The journal is currently edited by Palle Holmstrup (University of Copenhagen) and was established in 1939.

== Abstracting and indexing ==
According to the Journal Citation Reports, Acta Odontologica Scandinavicahas, it has an impact factor of 2.232 in 2021. It is published 8 times in a year. In addition, it is abstracted and indexed in Biological Abstracts, Chemical Abstracts, Current Contents/Clinical Medicine, EMBASE/Excerpta Medica, Index Medicus/MEDLINE, and the Science Citation Index.

== Article categories ==
The journal publishes articles in the following categories:

- Original articles
- Case report
- Case series
- Solicited and unsolicited reviews
- Editorials
- Letters
