= Sensors (journal) =

- Discipline: Sensors and biosensors
- Language: English
- Edited by: Vittorio M.N. Passaro, Assefa M. Melesse, Alexander Star, Eduard Llobet, Guillermo Villanueva, Davide Brunelli

Publication details
- History: 2001-present
- Publisher: MDPI
- Frequency: Semimonthly
- Open access: Yes
- Impact factor: 3.576 (2020)

Standard abbreviations
- ISO 4: Sensors (Basel)

Indexing
- CODEN: SENSC9
- ISSN: 1424-8220
- OCLC no.: 47250782

Links
- Journal homepage

Sensors is a monthly peer-reviewed, open access, scientific journal that is published by MDPI. It was established in June 2001. The editors-in-chief are Vittorio M.N. Passaro, Assefa M. Melesse, Alexander Star, Eduard Llobet, Guillermo Villanueva and Davide Brunelli. Sensors covers research on all aspects of sensors and biosensors. The journal publishes original research articles, short notes, review articles, book reviews, product reviews, and announcements related to academia.

== Abstracts and indices ==
The following databases offer indexing and abstracting services:

- Analytical Abstracts
- CAB Abstracts
- Chemical Abstracts Service
- Chemistry Citation Index
- EBSCOhost
- e-Helvetica
- Inspec
- Science Citation Index Expanded
- Scirus
- Scopus

According to the Journal Citation Reports, the journal has a 2020 impact factor of 3.576.
