= Directory of Open Access Journals =

Curated list of peer-reviewed Open-Access journals

- Available in: English
- Website: doaj.org
- Commercial: No
- Launched: 2003; 23 years ago
- Current status: Online

The Directory of Open Access Journals (DOAJ) is a website that hosts a community-curated list of open access journals, such as Biomass, maintained by Infrastructure Services for Open Access (IS4OA). It was launched in 2003 with 300 open access journals and now has expanded to over 22,886 indexed open access journals and 12,746,462 articles.

The mission of DOAJ is to "increase the visibility, accessibility, reputation, usage and impact of quality, peer-reviewed, open access scholarly research journals globally, regardless of discipline, geography or language."

In 2015, DOAJ launched a reapplication process based on updated and expanded inclusion criteria. At the end of the process (December 2017), close to 5,000 journals, out of the 11,600 indexed in May 2016, had been removed from their database, in majority for failure to reapply.

Notwithstanding the substantial cleanup, the number of journals included in DOAJ has continued to grow, to reach 14,299 as of 3 March 2020. As of April 2025, the independent database contains more than 21,480 open access journals and 11,045,921 articles covering all areas of science, technology, medicine, social sciences and the humanities.

DOAJ provides a change log on Google Sheets that has been updated since March 2014 and identifies the journals added and the journals removed with the justification for the removal.

Founder, Lars Bjørnshauge, announced his retirement in 2021 and from January 2022, DOAJ has a new Managing Director, Joanna Ball.

== History ==
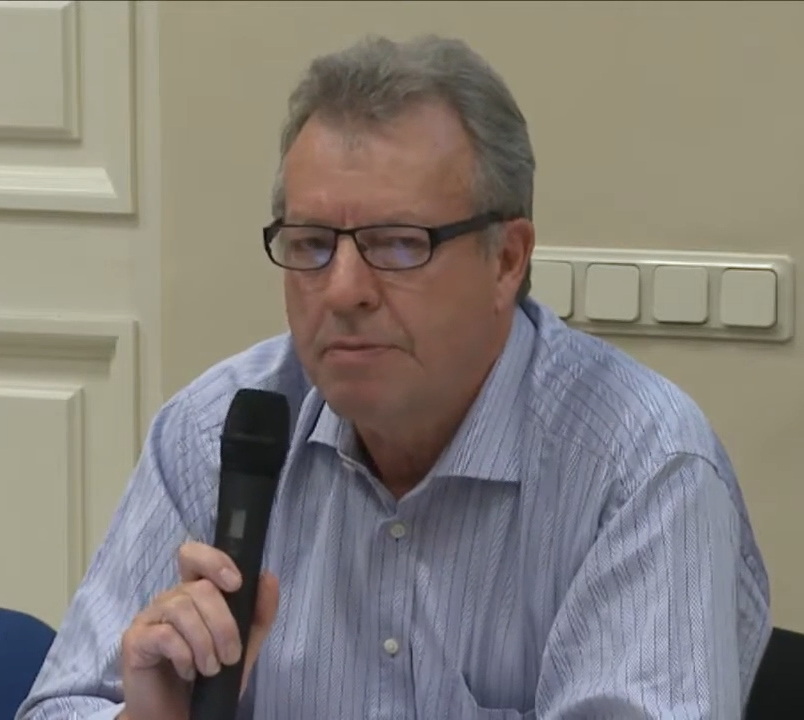
Founder and former managing director Lars Bjørnshauge

The Open Society Institute funded various open access related projects after the Budapest Open Access Initiative; the Directory was one of those projects. The idea for the DOAJ came out of discussions at the first Nordic Conference on Scholarly Communication in 2002. Lund University became the organization to set up and maintain the DOAJ. It continued to do so until January 2013, when Infrastructure Services for Open Access (IS4OA) took over.

The Infrastructure Services for Open Access (IS4OA) C.I.C. was founded in 2012 in the UK as a community interest company by open access advocates Caroline Sutton and Alma Swan. It runs the DOAJ and, until 2017, the Open Citations Corpus.

In a 2015 comparison with MEDLINE, PubMed Central, EMBASE and SCOPUS, DOAJ resulted to have the highest number of open access journals listed, but less than a half of them had actively published contents on DOAJ.

There is a partnership between DOAJ and OpenAIRE since October 2022.

== Criteria for journals ==
A number of criteria are used for inclusion of open access journals. This includes aspects such as:

- Journal can be in any language
- Must be active in publishing scholarly research (at least five articles per year)
- Actively publishing for at least one year or has published at least 10 open access articles
- Journal must have a dedicated website and open access policy

== See also ==
- List of academic databases and search engines
- List of open-access journals
- Open Access Scholarly Publishers Association
- Free Journal Network
- Paperity - aggregator of open access journals
