= MDPI =

Scientific journal publisher

- Status: Active
- Founded: 1996
- Founder: Shu-Kun Lin
- Country of origin: Switzerland
- Headquarters location: Basel, Switzerland
- Distribution: Worldwide
- Publication types: Open access scientific journals
- No. of employees: 6,750 (in 2022)
- Official website: mdpi.com

MDPI (Multidisciplinary Digital Publishing Institute) is a publisher of open-access scientific journals. It publishes over 390 peer-reviewed, open-access journals. MDPI is among the largest publishers in the world in terms of journal article output, and was the largest publisher of open access articles in 2020.

It was founded by Shu-Kun Lin as a chemical sample archive. Between 2016 and 2020, the number of peer-reviewed papers published by MDPI grew significantly, with year-over-year growth of over 50% in 2017, 2018 and 2019, attracting attention to their very fast article processing times. In a review of 26 open-access "mega-journals" that published over 3,500 papers in 2022, 11 (42%) of the journals were from MDPI. Besides launching its own journals, MDPI has acquired journals from other publishers, such as Tomography from Grapho Publications in 2021, and Nursing Reports and Audiology Research from PagePress Publications in 2020.

As of January 2024, MDPI publishes 433 academic journals, including 92 journals indexed within the Science Citation Index Expanded, 7 journals indexed within the Social Sciences Citation Index, 138 journals listed in SciFinder, and 270 in Scopus. Its journals are included in the DOAJ. MDPI also publishes open access books indexed in DOAB, OAPEN and BCI. It is a member of the Open Access Scholarly Publishers Association (OASPA), the Committee on Publication Ethics (COPE), the International Association of Scientific, Technical, and Medical Publishers (STM), and a participating publisher and supporter of the Initiative for Open Citations (I4OC).

MDPI's business model is based on establishing entirely open access broad-discipline journals, with fast processing times from submission to publication and article processing charges paid by the author, their institutions or funders. MDPI's business practices have attracted controversy, with critics suggesting it sacrifices editorial and academic rigor in favor of operational speed and business interests. MDPI was included on Jeffrey Beall's list of predatory open access publishing companies in 2014; it was removed in 2015 following a successful appeal, while applying pressure on Beall's employer. Some journals published by MDPI have also been noted by the Chinese Academy of Sciences (CAS) and Norwegian Scientific Index for lack of rigor and possible predatory practices; as of 2025, CAS no longer lists any MDPI journals on its Early Warning List. In 2024, Finland's Publication Forum, which classifies publication channels for academic research, downgraded 193 MDPI journals to its lowest, level 0 rating.

== History ==
MDPI traces its roots to Molecular Diversity Preservation International, also abbreviated MDPI, which was founded by Shu-Kun Lin in 1996 as a chemical sample archive, with some scholarly publishing and conference activities. The second organisation, Multidisciplinary Digital Publishing Institute, was founded in 2010, primarily as a publisher. All of MDPI's journals have been open access and since 2008 published under a Creative Commons Attribution License (CC BY).

=== Molecular Diversity Preservation International ===
Molecular Diversity Preservation International was founded and registered as a non-profit association (Verein) by Shu-Kun Lin and Benoit R. Turin in Basel in 1996 to enable the deposit and exchange of rare molecular and biomolecular research samples.

The journal Molecules was established in 1996 in collaboration with Springer-Verlag (now Springer Science+Business Media) in order to document the chemical samples of the MDPI collection. Several other journals were established by the MDPI Verein, including Entropy (1999), the International Journal of Molecular Sciences (2000), Sensors (2001), Marine Drugs (2003), and the International Journal of Environmental Research and Public Health (2004). The publisher MDPI AG was spun off from MDPI Verein in 2010.

MDPI Verein co-organized several academic conferences, including the International Symposium on Frontiers in Molecular Science. It also runs virtual conferences, such as the Electronic Conference on Synthetic Organic Chemistry, which was started in 1997. In 2010 MDPI launched the platform Sciforum.net to host virtual conferences. In 2014, various virtual conferences were hosted in the areas of synthetic organic chemistry, material sciences, sensors, and sustainability. In 2015, MDPI co-organized two physical conferences with and at the University of Basel, the 4th Internationational Symposium on Sensor Science and the 5th World Sustainability Forum. Since 2015, scholars can organize their own conference for free on the Sciforum platform.

=== MDPI (Multidisciplinary Digital Publishing Institute) ===
MDPI as a publisher of open-access scientific journals was spun off from the Molecular Diversity Preservation International organization. It was formally registered by Shu-Kun Lin and Dietrich Rordorf in May 2010 with its official headquarters in Basel, Switzerland. Including Switzerland, MDPI has editorial offices in 11 countries, with five offices in China, two offices in both Romania and Serbia, and offices in the United Kingdom, Canada, Spain, Poland, Japan, Thailand, and Singapore.

The number of published papers has been growing significantly in the last decade with year over year growth of over 50% in 2017, 2018 and 2019, with 110,000 papers published in 2019. MDPI reported publishing 235,638 papers in 2021 alone. In 2020, MDPI was the largest publisher of open access papers in the world and the 5th largest publisher overall in terms of journal paper output.

MDPI was an early pioneer of the special issue model for academic publishing. The special issues are collections of papers on a specific topic, handled by guest editors (as opposed to members of the journal's editorial board). Many special issue papers are invited, either by the journal staff or by the guest editors. Roughly 88% of MDPI papers are published in special issues. The number of MDPI special issues has grown rapidly, alongside significant year-over-year growth in total papers published: in 2020, MDPI journals hosted a total of 6,756 special issues, compared to 39,587 special issues in 2021. However, only 10,504 of these 2021 special issues ultimately resulted in published papers. The number of special issues publishing papers rose to 17,777 in 2022.

MDPI operates Scilit, a free multidisciplinary scholarly literature aggregator. A 2026 review in Katina Magazine, published by Annual Reviews, reported that Scilit indexed approximately 190 million publications from nearly 30,000 publishers and described it as a useful supplementary discovery resource, while noting limitations compared with commercial bibliographic databases such as Web of Science and Scopus.

== Controversies ==
MDPI has had a number of controversies from the scientific community relating to its paper selection and review processes and the quality of its publications.

=== "Who's Afraid of Peer Review?" sting ===
In 2013, the MDPI journal Cancers rejected a fake paper submitted to it in the "Who's Afraid of Peer Review?" sting operation.

=== Inclusion in Beall's list ===
MDPI was included on Jeffrey Beall's list of predatory open access publishing companies in February 2014. Beall's concern was that "MDPI's warehouse journals contain hundreds of lightly-reviewed articles that are mainly written and published for promotion and tenure purposes rather than to communicate science." Beall also claimed that MDPI used email spam to solicit manuscripts and that the company listed Nobel laureates on its journals' editorial boards without their knowledge. MDPI responded to Beall's claims, seeking to debunk them. Chemist Peter Murray-Rust criticized the inclusion of MDPI in Beall's list, writing in a blog post that Beall's criticism of the publisher "lacks evidence" and was "irresponsible". Commenters on the blog post (including Beall himself) noted that, despite Murray-Rust claiming to have "no personal involvement with MDPI", he was listed on their website as a member of their editorial board.

MDPI made a successful appeal to the Beall's list appeals board in October 2015, and was removed from the list. Even after its removal, Beall remained critical of MDPI; in December 2015 he wrote: "it is clear that MDPI sees peer review as merely a perfunctory step that publishers have to endure before publishing papers and accepting money from the authors," and "it's clear that MDPI's peer review is managed by clueless clerical staff in China."

Beall's list was shut down in 2017. Beall later wrote that he had been pressured to shut down the list by both his employer, University of Colorado Denver, and various publishers, specifically mentioning MDPI as a publisher that had "tried to be as annoying as possible to the university so that the officials would get so tired of the emails that they would silence me just to make them stop." Although his supervisor insisted that the university had supported Beall, the university did open a research misconduct review of Beall's listing of another open access publisher, Frontiers Media. The investigation closed without findings.

=== 2014 OASPA evaluation ===
Following Beall's criticism of MDPI, the Open Access Scholarly Publishers Association (OASPA) conducted an investigation in April 2014. This investigation was based on the controversy surrounding two papers, one in Life, the other in Nutrients; the listing of Nobel Prize winners on the website; the roles of editorial board members and of Shu-Kun Lin within the company; and the functions of the different office locations. OASPA concluded that MDPI satisfactorily meets the OASPA Membership Criteria.

=== 2016 data breach ===
In August 2016, MDPI was breached, leaving exposed 17.5 GB of data, including 845,000 e-mail addresses and e-mail exchanges between authors, editors and reviewers. According to MDPI, the unprotected instance at which the data was breached has since been protected.

=== Resignations of editors ===
In August 2018, 10 senior editors (including the editor-in-chief) of the journal Nutrients resigned, alleging that MDPI forced the replacement of the editor-in-chief because of his high editorial standards and for resisting pressure to "accept manuscripts of mediocre quality and importance."

In June 2020, the would-be guest editors of a special issue in the International Journal of Environmental Research and Health resigned after being informed by an MDPI representative that a quota of publication-fee exemptions allocated to the special issue could only be given to scholars from developed countries.

In 2021, five members of the editorial board of the journal Vaccines resigned after Vaccines published a controversial article that misused data to reach the incorrect conclusion that vaccines against COVID-19 had no clear benefit.

=== Withdrawals of support by faculties and universities ===
In December 2021, the Faculty of Science of the University of South Bohemia in České Budějovice announced that it will stop financial support for publishing in MDPI journals, officially recommended against publishing in or reviewing for MDPI, and warned that publications in MDPI journals might not be taken into account for evaluations of employees and departments. In January 2023, Zhejiang Gongshang University (浙江工商大学) in Hangzhou, China, announced it would no longer include articles published in Hindawi, MDPI, and Frontiers journals when evaluating researcher performance.

=== Inclusion in Early Warning List of the Chinese Academy of Sciences ===
In December 2020, the Chinese Academy of Sciences published a list of journals that may suffer from issues of scientific quality and other risk characteristics. There were 22 MDPI group journals in the 65 journals given in its initial list. MDPI responded to the list promising to communicate with the academy and improve its journals' parameters to remove the affected journals from the list as soon as possible. The list was updated in December 2021 and reduced to only 41 journals, of which seven MDPI journals were included. In the 2025 revision of the list, all MDPI journals were removed.

=== Perception among Hungarian researchers ===
A survey published in 2022 asked Hungarian researchers for their perception of MDPI journals. Those Hungarian researchers generally felt MDPI journals were sufficiently prestigious to be worth publishing in, being indexed in major databases and having reasonable journal impact factor. However, most researchers felt the primary driving force to publish with MDPI journals was their fast article turnaround time. In 2019–2020, MDPI articles took 35–37 days on average for acceptance (including revisions), and 41 days to publish the final article online after its initial submission, as compared to an industry average of 163 days.

=== Assessments in the Nordic countries ===
MDPI has been criticized by scientific bodies in Norway, Finland, and Denmark that rank academic journals for their quality and relevance. In the Finnish and Danish lists, the majority of MDPI journals do not meet the criteria of the body to be ranked in the list. The Norwegian Scientific Index has been less critical, giving the vast majority of individual MDPI journals designations as "level 1", their "standard" rating denoting a publisher as academic; although some journals are ranked "level 0" denoting non-academic status, including one of MDPI's flagship journals, Sustainability. In 2021, following a survey sent to Norwegian scientists, the Norwegian Scientific Index also created a special rank called "level X", which was used to denote journals undergoing evaluation as possible predatory journals, specifically citing concerns over MDPI journals for the new rank's creation.

The head of the National Publication Committee of Norway and a number of Norwegian scholars have been highly critical of MDPI, with some lobbying to remove MDPI from the Norwegian Scientific Index entirely. They cite the poor reputation of MDPI among Nordic scientific bodies, how there are many academics that boycott MDPI journals outright, or accuse MDPI journals of having a peer review process that is not up to academic standards. Among their descriptions, they call MDPI a Chinese organization with a "small artificial office in Switzerland", and "a money-making machine" that plays on the desire of academics to embellish their CV.

=== Allegation of anomalous citation patterns ===
In July 2021, Maria Ángeles Oviedo-García published a paper in OUP journal Research Evaluation claiming that MDPI journals had anomalously high self-citation rates compared to leading journals in the same fields. The alleged high self-citation rate is not to other articles in the same journal, but rather to other MDPI journals. Oviedo-García argued that this is indicative of predatory journals. MDPI released a response to Oviedo-García's paper on their website eight days later. MDPI highlighted a number of issues with the article and its framing, arguing in particular that leading journals should not be directly compared to non-leading journals; MDPI also argued that, when compared to other publishers, MDPI does not have anomalously high self-citations. Research Evaluation published an expression of concern for Oviedo-García's paper in September 2021, which eventually led to a correction published in April 2023. Changes made to the article added caveats and toned down inflammatory language, however the core conclusions remained the same.

A 2023 study utilizing a different method reached a broadly similar conclusion that MDPI journals had more self-citations than journals by other publishers. The study also found that MDPI journals received more citations from a smaller network of journals, relative to journals by other publishers.

=== Concerns over papers connected to a research paper mill ===
In December 2021, it was reported how the research paper mill International Publisher Ltd. had sold authorships to hundreds of publications published across most major publishers; a controversy attracting international attention that affected many major publishing groups. The report highlighted a ring of MDPI guest editors that provided a network for the sale of authorship for articles published across multiple MDPI journals (Sustainability, Mathematics, Energies, and the Journal of Theoretical and Applied Commerce Research). Also in December 2021, Dr. Brian Perron highlighted how International Publisher Ltd. had published articles in the International Journal of Emerging Technologies in Learning (iJet), and MDPI including articles from Energies. In response, iJet retracted thirty articles, and thanked Perron and his team for their concerning findings. In response, Damaris Critchlow from MDPI stated that MDPI was investigating the papers in question and developing strategies to combat paper mills. Perron later expressed appreciation with how iJet had handled its response, but frustration with MDPI for not taking his allegations of fraud seriously, citing how one Energies article still did not even have an expression of concern added six months later.

=== 2023 Clarivate delistings ===
In February 2023, Clarivate discontinued coverage of two MDPI journals, the International Journal of Environmental Research and Public Health and the Journal of Risk and Financial Management in the Web of Science, for publishing content not related to their scope. As a result, both were removed from the Clarivate Web of Science database, losing their impact factors. Also, citations from these journals no longer affect the impact factors of other journals.

=== 2024 Finnish downgrading ===
In December 2024, Finland's Publication Forum (JUFO), which classifies publication channels for academic research, downgraded 193 MDPI journals to its lowest, level 0 rating. These are outside the organization's 3 level scale and receive the same points in funding applications as popular articles or publications without peer-review. JUFO referred to these publications as "grey area journals", including journals from Frontiers along those of MDPI's. The organization decided to retain the previous, level 1 rating for 16 MDPI journals.

=== Controversial articles ===
In December 2011, the MDPI journal Life published Erik D. Andrulis' theoretical paper, "Theory of the Origin, Evolution, and Nature of Life", which claimed to present a unified theory of everything, asserting that the basis of all matter and energy in the universe, including subatomic particles, is something which the author refers to as "gyres". It attracted coverage by the popular science and technology magazines Ars Technica and Popular Science, which described it as "crazy" and "hilarious". A member of Life's editorial board resigned in response.

In 2013, another MDPI journal, Entropy, published a review paper claiming that glyphosate may be the most consequential factor in the development of obesity, depression, attention deficit hyperactivity disorder, autism, Alzheimer's disease, Parkinson's disease, multiple sclerosis, cancer, and infertility. The paper itself does not contain any primary research results. It was criticized as pseudo-science by popular science magazine Discover. Jeffrey Beall noted that both of the paper's authors, Anthony Samsel and Stephanie Seneff, had backgrounds in computer science rather than biochemistry or human disease, and wrote, "When publishers like MDPI disseminate research by science activists like Stephanie Seneff and her co-authors, I think it's fair to question the credibility of all the research that MDPI publishes. Will MDPI publish anything for money?".

A study published in the MDPI journal Nutrients in 2011 went through a series of corrections, first in August 2011, then in April 2012, and then again in February 2014. The article claimed that obesity rates in Australia had increased over the same period of time that sugary soft drink consumption declined by 10%. The article was used by soft drink industry lobbyists to argue that sugary drinks were not significantly contributing to obesity rates. However the article itself debunked its own claim, with one figure showing that sugary soft drink consumption had increased by 30% during the time period where the authors claimed a 10% reduction in consumption. Nutrients issued a correction claiming that the previously described 10% drop in consumption referred to an increase in the use of artificial sweeteners, and reflected overall sugar consumption rather than soft drink consumption. The correction said that "some words were missing." This correction has been derided by some as "nonsense" and untrue, suggesting that it does not address the core issue of whether sugary soft drink consumption increased in Australia over the time period investigated. The journal Nutrients and the senior author of the article maintain that the thrice-corrected article is now accurate, and that corrections that were made were immaterial to the conclusions of the study.

In 2016, MDPI journal Behavioral Sciences published a review paper that claimed that watching pornography is a cause of erectile dysfunction. After critics raised concerns, an independent review by the Committee on Publication Ethics (COPE) recommended that the article be retracted, based on issues including an unusual editorial process in which the listed journal editor declared that he "was not involved in the final decision regarding correction/retraction/authorship," an inaccurate and incomplete conflict of interest declaration that failed to disclose author connections with anti-pornography activist groups, failure to obtain informed consent from the study subjects, and failure to protect the identities of those subjects. Instead of retracting the paper, MDPI removed the editor's name from the paper and issued an amended conflict of interest statement which, according to Retraction Watch, did not fully address the conflicts of interest identified by COPE, nor the other issues identified by them. When contacted by Retraction Watch, MDPI's response was "The argument is already done. Both sides got large audience. Time to stop and made peace."

The journal Magnetochemistry accepted a paper in 2019 by controversial researcher Susan Pockett which stated that "scientists are suppressing evidence that microwave radiation from smartphones and other devices cause harm to people". The paper was later that year retracted due to lack of a scientific contribution and being an opinion article. The journal initially invited Susan Pockett to submit a paper, according to the author's own account.

In 2019, MDPI journal Psych published an editorial on race and intelligence by Richard Lynn, who had previously had his emeritus status revoked due to his promotion of discredited sexist and racist views, such as scientific racism. MDPI later issued an expression of concern and changed the status of the article from editorial to opinion, three months after publication. According to science journalist Angela Saini, Psych had also published other similar work defending scientific racism.

In 2021, the MDPI journal Vaccines published an article by pseudoscience advocate Harald Walach and colleagues claiming a "lack of clear benefit" for COVID-19 vaccines. The article was heavily criticized for misusing data and as a result reaching a false conclusion. Katie Ewer, one of the journal's editors, called the publication of the article "grossly irresponsible" and resigned from the editorial board as a protest against its publication. Subsequently, four other members of the editorial board also resigned. Shortly afterwards, the journal published an "expression of concern" regarding the article and opened an investigation into the review process. The paper had received three reviewer reports (which the journal later made public) which were, however, not very detailed and had apparently been written by reviewers who did not have topic expertise. Vaccines eventually decided to retract the article.

=== Stealth corrections ===
A 2025 study in Learned Publishing examining journals conducting post-publication changes without indicating the permanent or temporary alterations of published material found evidence of MDPI journals engaging in this practice. The study suggested that this practice may "threaten scientific integrity" as such stealth corrections may "potentially benefit journals, publishers and authors engaging in misconduct". The study highlighted shortcomings in MDPI editorial practices and guidelines which perpetuate this issue.

== Proliferation of special issues ==
Paolo Crosetto, research director at INRAE-GAEL, first noted the proliferation of MDPI special issues in his blog in April 2021, giving them, alongside a fast turnaround time, credit for MDPI's success. He reported that in 2013, MDPI published 388 special issues, or about 5 per journal, while in 2021, the number grew to nearly 40,000, or about 500 per journal.

Special issues usually are proposed by scientists to a journal, which then makes the decision of whether or not the special issue is suitable for the journal. Crosetto noted that in contrast, "at MDPI, it is the publisher who sends out invitations for Special Issue [sic], and it is unclear which role, if any, the editorial board of the normal issues has in the process."

In July 2021, Oviedo-García analysed the number of special issues published by MDPI journals in 2019 and 2020. In 2019, the numbers varied greatly, from 14 in the journal Vaccines, to 500 in the journal International Journal of Molecular Sciences, with the average number of special issues in each journal being 113. The number of special issues was more than double the number of regular issues in over 90% of MDPI journals. In 2020, the numbers were even higher, reaching "as surprisingly high as 788 special issues in Sustainability, 830 in Applied Sciences, and 846 in Materials." Nearly 95% of all MDPI journals published more than one special issue per week.

According to Jack Grove in Inside Higher Ed, International Journal of Molecular Sciences will host 3,514 "special issues with a closing date in 2023", and Sustainability 3,512, averaging over more than nine special issues per day. This number of special issues leads to "concerns about how peer review can be conducted effectively at this scale" as well as questions about the thematic relevance to the journal.

== See also ==
- List of MDPI academic journals
