= IFIS Publishing =

Academic publishing company

IFIS
- Trade name: IFIS Publishing
- Industry: Publishing
- Genre: Academic
- Founded: 1968
- Headquarters: Reading, Berkshire

IFIS is an academic publishing company and not-for-profit organisation operating in the sciences of food and health.

Based in Reading, IFIS produces the online bibliographic database, FSTA, a resource which the company has offered since 1969. FSTA (Food Science and Technology Abstracts) includes over two million scientific non-predatory records from trusted sources, all related to disciplines surrounding food and beverages.

As a not-for-profit organisation and educational charity, IFIS:

- offers access to researchers in developing countries through the Research4Life programmes, HINARI, ARDI, OARE and AGORA.
- provides training and develops educational resources for the food community; for example, a best practice guide for literature searching and online learning module for how to research effectively.

IFIS work with a global network of regulatory experts in their Meet the Partners tool, and they produce Escalex Limits News and Alerts, a curated news and alerts service for legal developments in food.

IFIS also produces, in association with Wiley Blackwell, the Dictionary of Food Science & Technology, now in its second edition.

== History ==
Originally known as the International Food Information Service, IFIS was established in 1968 by the collaboration of four organisations:

- Institute of Food Technologists (IFT), USA
- The Centre for Biosciences and Agriculture International (CABI), UK
- Deutsche Landwirtschafts-Gesellschaft e.V (DLG), Germany
- The Centrum voor Landbouw Publikaties en Landbouwdocumemtatie (PUDOC), the Netherlands

The company was originally based at Lane End House in Shinfield, and moved to The Granary on Bridge Farm in Arborfield. Having moved in June 2020, they are now based in Winnersh Triangle, Berkshire, UK.

== FSTA – Food Science and Technology Abstracts ==
FSTA is a bibliographic abstracting and indexing (A&I) database for scientific and technological information relating to food, beverages, and nutrition. It contains over 1.5 million indexed records, with full-text links where available, covering over 5,475 active and historical journals, books, trade publications, reviews, conference proceedings, reports, patents, and standards.

The database is updated weekly with all records indexed against IFIS' thesaurus, containing over 13,000 food science keywords, curated and structured into hierarchies. The resource is used by researchers, industry practitioners, and students, and it contains information sources in 29 languages, sourced from publishers in over 60 countries.

Coverage includes all major commodities in the food and beverage industry, related applied and pure sciences, pet foods, food psychology, food economics, food safety, and more.

FSTA can be accessed through EBSCOhost, Ovid, Proquest Dialog, STN and Web of Science.

Launched in February 2022, was the FSTA database – with new full-text capability. FSTA with Full Text is produced in collaboration with EBSCO and is available exclusively on the EBSCO platform. Allowing users to quickly discover authoritative, food-focused research. Topics include:

- Biotechnology
- Food safety
- Omics technologies
- Pet foods
- Sport science
- Sustainability

== Ovid NutriHealth ==
In early 2024, IFIS Publishing collaborated with Wolters Kluwer to introduce Ovid NutriHealth (also known as Ovid Nutrition and Health), a comprehensive bibliographic database delivered via the OvidSP platform. Designed to fill gaps left by traditional medical databases, it aggregates over 500,000 indexed abstracts from peer-reviewed journals, patents, conference proceedings, standards, books, theses, and reports published since the 1960s—from 89 countries in 41 languages—and continues to grow by roughly 1,000 records each week .

The database is built on IFIS's extensive food-and-health thesaurus, enabling precise retrieval across disciplines. It offers deep coverage of medically relevant nutrition science, including noncommunicable diseases, allergies and immunology, mental health, cognition, nutrition therapy for diabetes and hydration, consumer behaviour, food formulation, the microbiome, cancer prevention, obesity, and more Wolters Kluwer.

Targeting academic, industry, and healthcare users, Ovid NutriHealth serves medical and nutrition students, clinicians, public health bodies, food and pharmaceutical companies, and librarians. It supports hypothesis development, policy-making, product innovation, and clinical decision‑making, while maintaining strict quality standards by vetting all sources against a 60‑point checklist to exclude predatory or unethical publications ifis.org.

As an integrated option on the Ovid platform, the database offers search features like faceted filtering, full‑text capabilities, and hit‑highlighting. Users can set up saved searches and alerts to stay current with the evolving field of diet and health research.

== CNKI Food Science Focus ==
In October 2024, IFIS Publishing partnered with China National Knowledge Infrastructure (CNKI) to launch CNKI Food Science Focus, a specialist bibliographic database tailored for the Chinese academic and research community. Unveiled at the Frankfurt Book Fair, the collaboration was formalized by senior representatives from both organizations, including IFIS Publishing's Carol Durham and CNKI's Zhang Hongwei. The database offers exclusive access within China via the CNKI platform.

CNKI Food Science Focus provides curated abstracts from over 1.7 million documents as of August 2024, drawn from peer-reviewed journals, patents, books, standards, theses, conference proceedings, and reports. Updated weekly with approximately 2,500 to 3,000 new records, the database supports research in a wide range of post-farm-gate topics such as food processing, microbiology, sensory science, biotechnology, nutrition, policy, packaging, public health, and food safety.

The resource benefits from IFIS's proprietary food and beverage thesaurus—the largest of its kind globally—which standardizes terminology across disciplines, sectors, and languages. Quality control is maintained through expert content selection and the exclusion of predatory journals. Designed with academic and industrial researchers in mind, it supports advanced search features, including faceted and full-text search with hit-highlighting. Users can create personal profiles to save searches and set up alerts, while librarians are supported with tailored training materials to assist users in literature discovery.
