= Animal Production Science =

- Discipline: Agriculture, animal science
- Language: English
- Edited by: Wayne Bryden

Publication details
- Former name(s): Australian Journal of Experimental Agriculture and Animal Husbandry, Australian Journal of Experimental Agriculture
- History: 1961-present
- Publisher: CSIRO Publishing (Australia)
- Frequency: Monthly
- Impact factor: 1.4 (2022)

Standard abbreviations
- ISO 4: Anim. Prod. Sci.

Indexing
- ISSN: 1836-0939 (print); 1836-5787 (web)

Links
- Journal homepage

Animal Production Science is an international peer-reviewed scientific journal for agriculture and animal science and published by CSIRO Publishing. Research articles in the journal focus on improving livestock and food production, and on the social and economic issues that influence primary producers. It is predominantly concerned with domesticated animals (beef cattle, dairy cows, sheep, pigs, goats and poultry); however, contributions on horses and wild animals are also published where relevant.

It was established in 1961 as Australian Journal of Experimental Agriculture and Animal Husbandry. In 1985, this was shortened to Australian Journal of Experimental Agriculture. The current name was adopted in 2009.

The current editor-in-chief is Wayne Bryden (University of Queensland).

== Abstracting and indexing ==
The journal is abstracted and indexed in AgriBiotech, Agricola, Australian Bibliography of Agriculture, Elsevier BIOBASE, BIOSIS, CAB Abstracts, Current Contents (Agriculture, Biology & Environmental Sciences), Food Science and Technology Abstracts, Institute for Scientific Information Moscow, Science Citation Index, Scopus and TEEAL.

== Impact factor ==
According to the Journal Citation Reports, the journal had an impact factor in 2022 of 1.4.
