= Australian Journal =

Australian Journal may refer to:

- Australian Journal of Botany
- Australian Journal of Chemistry
- Australian Journal of Primary Health
- The Australian Journal of Physiotherapy
- Australian Journal of International Affairs
- Australian Journal of Management
- Australian Journal of Physics
- Australian Journal of Politics and History
- The Australian Journal of Anthropology
- Australian Journal of Linguistics
- Australian Law Journal
- Australian Journal of Zoology
- The Australian Journal
