= Functional Plant Biology =

- Discipline: plant physiology
- Language: English
- Edited by: Sergey Shabala

Publication details
- Former name(s): Australian Journal of Plant Physiology
- Publisher: CSIRO Publishing (Australia)
- Frequency: Monthly
- Impact factor: 2.491 (2015)

Standard abbreviations
- ISO 4: Funct. Plant Biol.

Indexing
- ISSN: 1445-4408 (print); 1445-4416 (web)

Links
- Journal homepage; Online archive

Functional Plant Biology is an international peer-reviewed scientific journal published by CSIRO Publishing. The journal publishes papers of a broad interest that advance knowledge on mechanisms by which plants operate and interact with their environment. Of specific interest are mechanisms and signal transduction pathways by which plants adapt to extreme environmental conditions such as high and low temperatures, drought, flooding, salinity, pathogens, and other major abiotic and biotic stress factors.

The current editor-in-chief is Sergey Shabala (University of Tasmania).

== Abstracting and indexing ==
The journal is abstracted and indexed in ABOA/Streamline, AGRICOLA, Biological Abstracts, Biology and Environmental Sciences, Elsevier BIOBASE, BIOSIS, CAB Abstracts, Chemical Abstracts, Current Contents (Agriculture, Biology & Environmental Sciences), Current Contents (Life Sciences), Reference Update, Scopus and TEEAL.

== Impact factor ==
According to the Journal Citation Reports, the journal has a 2015 impact factor of 2.491.
