= Roderick W. Home =

Australian historian of science (born 1939)

Roderick Weir "R.W." Home (born 6 January 1939), is an Australian historian of science. Home was Professor of History and Philosophy of Science, University of Melbourne from 1975 until his retirement emeritus 2002. He was awarded the 2025 Koyré Medal.

Home was Foundation Director of the Australian Science Archives Project (ASAP) 1985–96 and Chairman of its National Advisory Board. The work of ASAP is now carried on by the Australian Science and Technology Heritage Centre. He was a long time editor of the journal Historical Records of Australian Science beginning in 1984.

== Early life and education ==
Home was born on 6 January 1939. He was educated at the University of Melbourne (BSc 1960), Haileybury College (DLitt. Physics Master 1964) and Indiana University (PhD 1967).

== Career ==
Home joined the Department of History and Philosophy of Science of the University of Melbourne in 1967 and retired emeritus in 2002, though remaining active in research. He was a lecturer 1967–70, a senior Lecturer 1970–75, and a full professor 1975–2002. He was the author of 17 books and over 150 articles and book chapters. One of his notable book projects was a three-volume documentation of the scientific achievements of Ferdinand von Mueller, a German-Austrian scientist who was appointed Government Botanist for Victoria by Governor Charles La Trobe in 1853, published from 1998 to 2006.

In addition to his position at Melbourne, Home served as President of the Australasian Association for the History, Philosophy and Social Studies of Science 1977–80, as editor of the journal Historical Records of Australian Science 1984–?, and as foundation director of the Australian Science Archives Project 1985–96 and chairman of its national advisory board.

Although Professor Home retired from Melbourne in December 2002, he continued to play a leading role in documenting and preserving the history of Australian science as editor of the Historical Records of Australian Science.

He was recognized as a Fellow of the Australian Academy of the Humanities, a Corresponding Member of the International Academy of the History of Science, and a member of the Order of Australia. In 2025, he was awarded the Koyré Medal of the International Academy of the History of Science.
