= AJPH =

AJPH may refer to:

- Australian Journal of Politics and History
- Australian Journal of Primary Health
- The American Journal of Public Health
