= Crop & Pasture Science =

Crop and Pasture Science
- Discipline: Agriculture, Agronomy
- Language: English
- Edited by: Sergio Atienza, Zed Rengel

Publication details
- Former name(s): Australian Journal of Agricultural Research
- Publisher: CSIRO Publishing (Australia)
- Frequency: Monthly
- Impact factor: 1.488 (2015)

Standard abbreviations
- ISO 4: Crop Pasture Sci.

Indexing
- ISSN: 1836-0947 (print); 1836-5795 (web)

Links
- Journal homepage

Crop and Pasture Science is an international peer-reviewed scientific journal published by CSIRO Publishing. It publishes outcomes of strategic research in crop and pasture sciences and the sustainability of farming systems. The primary focus is broad-scale cereals, grain legumes, oilseeds and pastures as well as on experimental approaches from molecular level to whole systems.

The current Editors-in-Chief are Sergio Atienza (Consejo Superior de Investigaciones Científicas, Spain) and Zed Rengel (University of Western Australia).

== Abstracting and indexing ==
The journal is abstracted in AGRICOLA, Australian Bibliography of Agriculture, Elsevier BIOBASE, BIOSIS, CAB Abstracts, Chemical Abstracts, Current Contents (Agriculture, Biology & Environmental Sciences), Kew Index, Science Citation Index, Scopus and TEEAL.

== Impact factor ==
According to the Journal Citation Reports, the journal has a 2015 impact factor of 1.488.
