= Science (journal) =

Academic journal of the AAAS

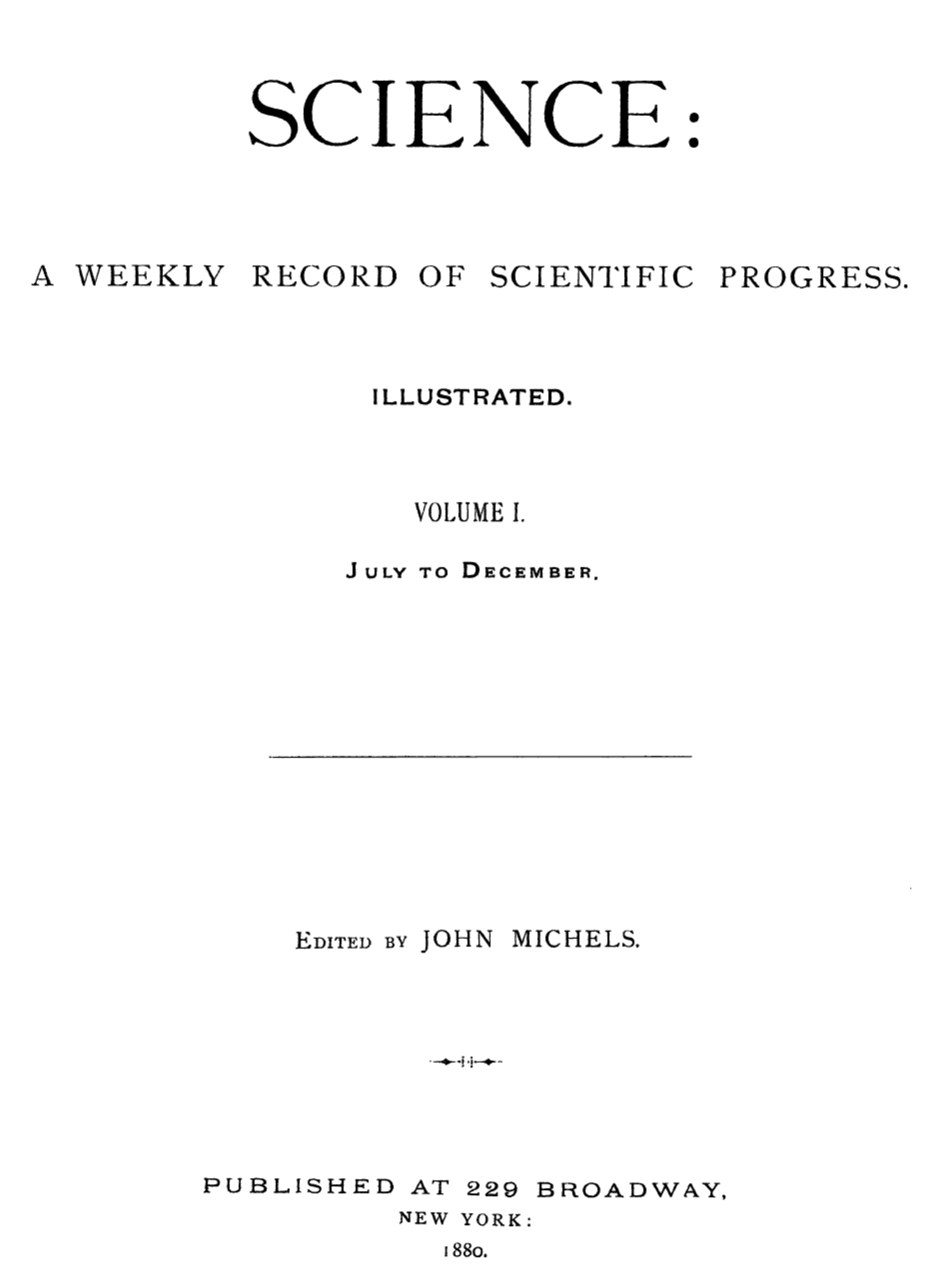
- Title page of the first volume of the first series (discontinued 1882)
- Discipline: Multidisciplinary
- Language: English
- Edited by: Holden Thorp

Publication details
- History: 1880–present
- Publisher: American Association for the Advancement of Science (United States)
- Frequency: Weekly
- Open access: Delayed
- Impact factor: 45.8 (2024)

Standard abbreviations
- ISO 4: Science

Indexing
- CODEN: SCIEAS
- ISSN: 0036-8075 (print); 1095-9203 (web)
- LCCN: 17024346
- JSTOR: 00368075
- OCLC no.: 1644869

Links
- Journal homepage; Online access; Online archives

Science is the peer-reviewed academic journal of the American Association for the Advancement of Science (AAAS) and one of the world's top academic journals. It was first published in 1880, is currently circulated weekly and has a subscriber base of around 130,000. Because institutional subscriptions and online access serve a larger audience, its estimated readership is over 400,000 people.

Science is based in the District of Columbia, United States, with a second office in Cambridge, England, United Kingdom.

== Contents ==
The major focus of the journal is publishing important original scientific research and research reviews, but Science also publishes science-related news, opinions on science policy and other matters of interest to scientists and others who are concerned with the wide implications of science and technology. Unlike most scientific journals, which focus on a specific field, Science and its rival Nature cover the full range of scientific disciplines. According to the Journal Citation Reports, Science's 2024 impact factor was 45.8.

Studies of methodological quality and reliability have found that some high-prestige journals including Science "publish significantly substandard structures", and overall "reliability of published research works in several fields may be decreasing with increasing journal rank".

Although it is the journal of the AAAS, membership in the AAAS is not required to publish in Science. Papers are accepted from authors around the world. Competition to publish in Science is very intense, as an article published in such a highly cited journal can lead to attention and career advancement for the authors. Fewer than 7% of articles submitted are accepted for publication.

== History ==
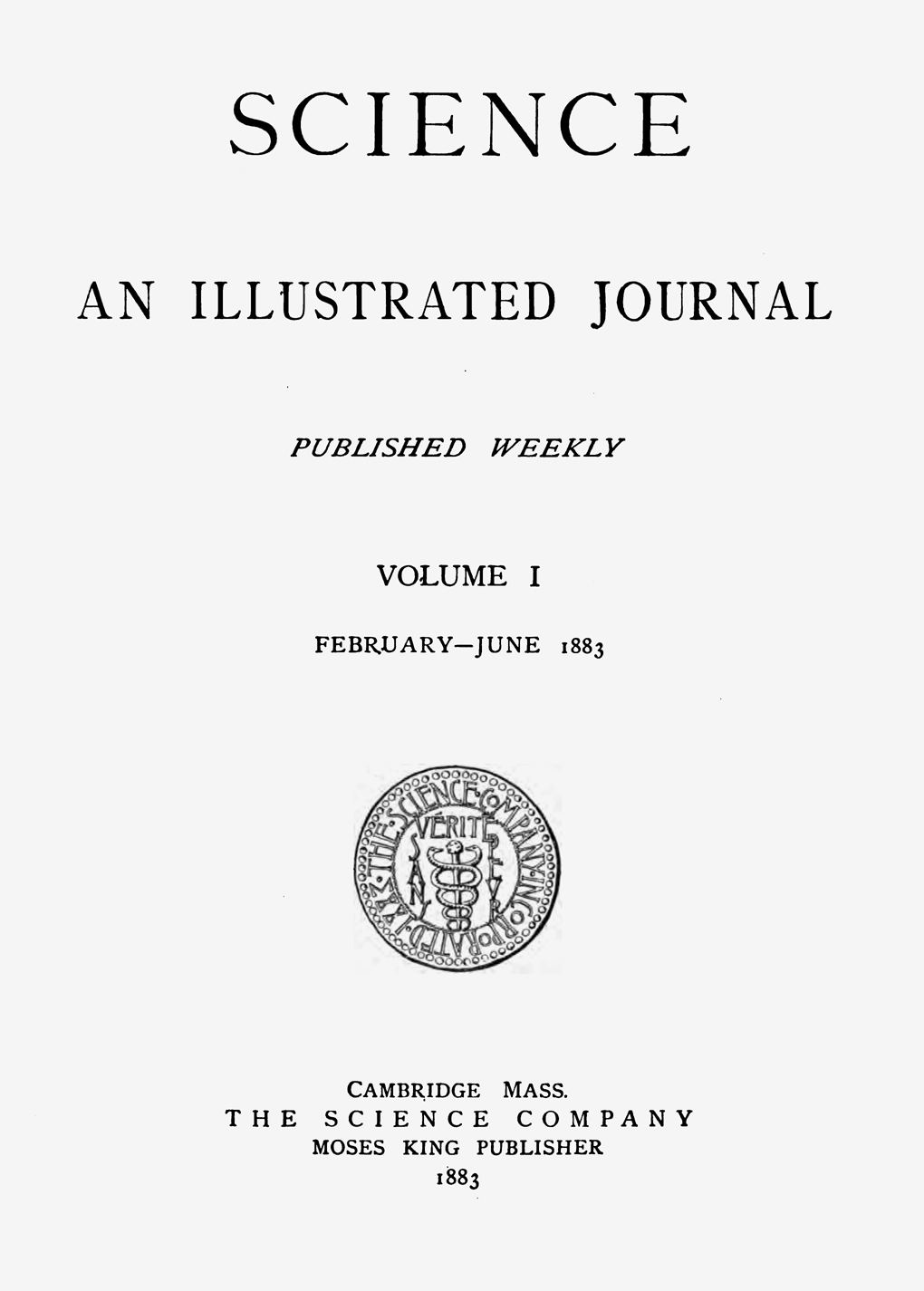
Title page of the first volume of the resurrected journal (February–June 1883)

Science was founded by English-born New York journalist John Michels in 1880 with financial support from Thomas Edison and later from Alexander Graham Bell. (Edison received favorable editorial treatment in return, without disclosure of the financial relationship, at a time when his reputation was suffering due to delays producing the promised commercially viable light bulb.) However, the journal never gained enough subscribers to succeed and ended publication in March 1882. Alexander Graham Bell and Gardiner Greene Hubbard bought the magazine rights and hired young entomologist Samuel H. Scudder to resurrect the journal one year later. They had some success while covering the meetings of prominent American scientific societies, including the AAAS. However, by 1894, Science was again in financial difficulty and was sold to psychologist James McKeen Cattell for $500 (equivalent to $18,610 in 2025).

In an agreement worked out by Cattell and AAAS secretary Leland O. Howard, Science became the journal of the American Association for the Advancement of Science in 1900. During the early part of the 20th century, important articles published in Science included papers on fruit fly genetics by Thomas Hunt Morgan, gravitational lensing by Albert Einstein, and spiral nebulae by Edwin Hubble. In addition, Roger Arliner Young became the first African-American woman to publish an article in 1924 (On the Excretory Apparatus in Paramecium). After Cattell died in 1944, the ownership of the journal was transferred to the AAAS.

After Cattell's death in 1944, the journal lacked a consistent editorial presence until Graham DuShane became editor in 1956. In 1958, under DuShane's leadership, Science absorbed The Scientific Monthly, thus increasing the journal's circulation by over 62% from 38,000 to more than 61,000. Physicist Philip Abelson, a co-discoverer of neptunium, served as editor from 1962 to 1984. Under Abelson the efficiency of the review process was improved and the publication practices were brought up to date. During this time, papers on the Apollo program missions and some of the earliest reports on AIDS were published.

Biochemist Daniel E. Koshland Jr. served as editor from 1985 until 1995. From 1995 until 2000, neuroscientist Floyd E. Bloom held that position. Biologist Donald Kennedy became the editor of Science in 2000. Biochemist Bruce Alberts took his place in March 2008. Geophysicist Marcia McNutt became editor-in-chief in June 2013. During her tenure the family of journals expanded to include Science Robotics and Science Immunology, and open access publishing with Science Advances. Jeremy M. Berg became editor-in-chief on July 1, 2016. Former Washington University in St. Louis Provost Holden Thorp was named editor-in-chief on Monday, August 19, 2019.

In February 2001, draft results of the human genome were simultaneously published by Nature and Science with Science publishing the Celera Genomics paper and Nature publishing the publicly funded Human Genome Project. In 2007, Science (together with Nature) received the Prince of Asturias Award for Communications and Humanity. In 2015, Rush D. Holt Jr., chief executive officer of the AAAS and executive publisher of Science, stated that the journal was becoming increasingly international: "[I]nternationally co-authored papers are now the norm—they represent almost 60 percent of the papers. In 1992, it was slightly less than 20 percent."

== Availability ==
The latest editions of the journal are available online, through the main journal website, only to subscribers, AAAS members, and for delivery to IP addresses at institutions that subscribe; students, K–12 teachers, and some others can subscribe at a reduced fee. However, research articles published after 1997 are available free (with online registration) one year after they are published i.e. delayed open access. Significant public-health related articles are also available free, sometimes immediately after publication. AAAS members may also access the pre-1997 Science archives at the Science website, where it is called "Science Classic".

The journal also participates in initiatives that provide free or low-cost access to readers in developing countries, including HINARI, OARE, AGORA, and Scidev.net.

Other features of the Science website include the free "ScienceNow" section with "up to the minute news from science", and "ScienceCareers", which provides free career resources for scientists and engineers. Science Express (Sciencexpress) provides advance electronic publication of selected Science papers.

== Affiliations ==
Science received funding for COVID-19-related coverage from the Pulitzer Center and the Heising-Simons Foundation.

== See also ==
- AAAS publications
- Breakthrough of the Year
- List of scientific journals
