= Soil Research =

- Discipline: Agriculture, soil science
- Language: English
- Edited by: Balwant Singh, Mark Tibbett

Publication details
- Former name(s): Australian Journal of Soil Research
- History: 1963–present
- Publisher: CSIRO Publishing (Australia)
- Frequency: 8/year
- Impact factor: 1.2 (2023)

Standard abbreviations
- ISO 4: Soil Res.

Indexing
- ISSN: 1838-675X (print); 1838-6768 (web)
- OCLC no.: 643595436

Links
- Journal homepage; Online access; All issues

Soil Research is an international peer-reviewed scientific journal published by CSIRO Publishing. It aims to rapidly publish high-quality, novel research about fundamental and applied aspects of soil science. As well as publishing in traditional aspects of soil biology, soil physics and soil chemistry across terrestrial ecosystems, the journal also publishes manuscripts dealing with wider interactions of soils with the environment.

It was established in 1963 as the Australian Journal of Soil Research and obtained its current title in 2011.

The current Editors-in-Chief are Balwant Singh (University of Sydney) and Mark Tibbett (University of Reading).

== Abstracting and indexing ==
The journal is abstracted and indexed in ABOA/Streamline, Elsevier BIOBASE, BIOSIS, CAB Abstracts, Chemical Abstracts, Current Contents (Agriculture, Biology & Environmental Sciences), Science Citation Index, Scopus and TEEAL.

== Impact factor ==
According to the Journal Citation Reports, the journal has a 2023 impact factor of 1.2.
