= Epidemiology of syphilis =

Eradication efforts and prevalence of syphilis

Age-standardized death from syphilis per 100,000 inhabitants in 2004. no data <35 35–70 70–105 105–140 140–175 175–210 210–245 245–280 280–315 315–350 350–500 >500

Syphilis is a bacterial infection transmitted by sexual contact and is believed to have infected 12 million people in 1999 with greater than 90% of cases in the developing world. It affects between 700,000 and 1.6 million pregnancies a year, resulting in spontaneous abortions, stillbirths, and congenital syphilis. In Sub-Saharan Africa syphilis contributes to approximately 20% of perinatal deaths.

In the developed world, syphilis infections were in decline until the 1980s and 1990s due to widespread use of antibiotics. Since the year 2000, rates of syphilis have been increasing in the US, UK, Australia, and Europe primarily among men who have sex with men (MSM). This is attributed to unsafe sexual practices. A sexually transmitted infection (STI) Surveillance study done by the Centers for Disease Control and Prevention in 2016 showed that men who have sex with men only account for over half (52%) of the 27,814 cases in the US during that year. The highest rates of primary and secondary syphilis in were observed among men aged 20–34 years, and among black men.

Increased rates among heterosexuals have occurred in China and Russia since the 1990s. Syphilis increases the risk of HIV transmission by two to five times and co-infection is common (30–60% in a number of urban centers).

Untreated, it has a mortality rate of 8% to 17%, with a greater death rate in males. The higher incidence of mortality among males compared to females is not well understood, but is thought to be related to immunological differences across gender. The symptoms of syphilis have become less severe over the 19th and 20th century in part due to widespread availability of effective treatment and partly due to decreasing virulence of the spirochete. With early treatment few complications result.

== China ==
In China, rates of syphilis have increased from the 1990s to the 2010s. This occurred after a successful campaign to reduce rates was carried out in the 1950s. Rates of diagnosis are higher in urban coastal areas. This may be due to sexual practices or better diagnosis in these areas.

Rates of syphilis in 2000–2005 among low-risk groups such as women without children and unmarried people were about 0.3–0.6% while rates among high-risk groups such as drug users and MSM were about 7–15%. Rates are greatest among men who have sex with men and sex workers.

The increase has been attributed to a number of factors including: migration from rural communities to urban environments, increased numbers of unmarried men, limited screening for disease, partners not always getting notification, and the fact that high-risk groups frequently do not seek health care.

Co-infection of HIV and syphilis is probably a major reason behind resurgence in syphilis prevalence among men who have sex with men in China. It is hypothesized that the association observed between syphilis and HIV among MSM is probably due to similar risks associated with both infections. Analysis of data from a survey among MSM in seven Chinese cities reveal that the factors significantly associated with co-infection are older age, education up to senior high school, unprotected anal intercourse, recent STI symptoms, and incorrect knowledge about routes of transmission.

One reason for increasing syphilis infection rates in China is suboptimal testing uptake among key populations. SESH, a research partnership dedicated to developing creative, equitable, and effective solutions to sexual health dilemmas, has looked extensively into ways to improve syphilis detection among MSM. Research suggests that testing can be optimized by offering rapid STI testing at MSM-focused centers, improving confidentiality, and ensuring test accuracy.

== Europe ==
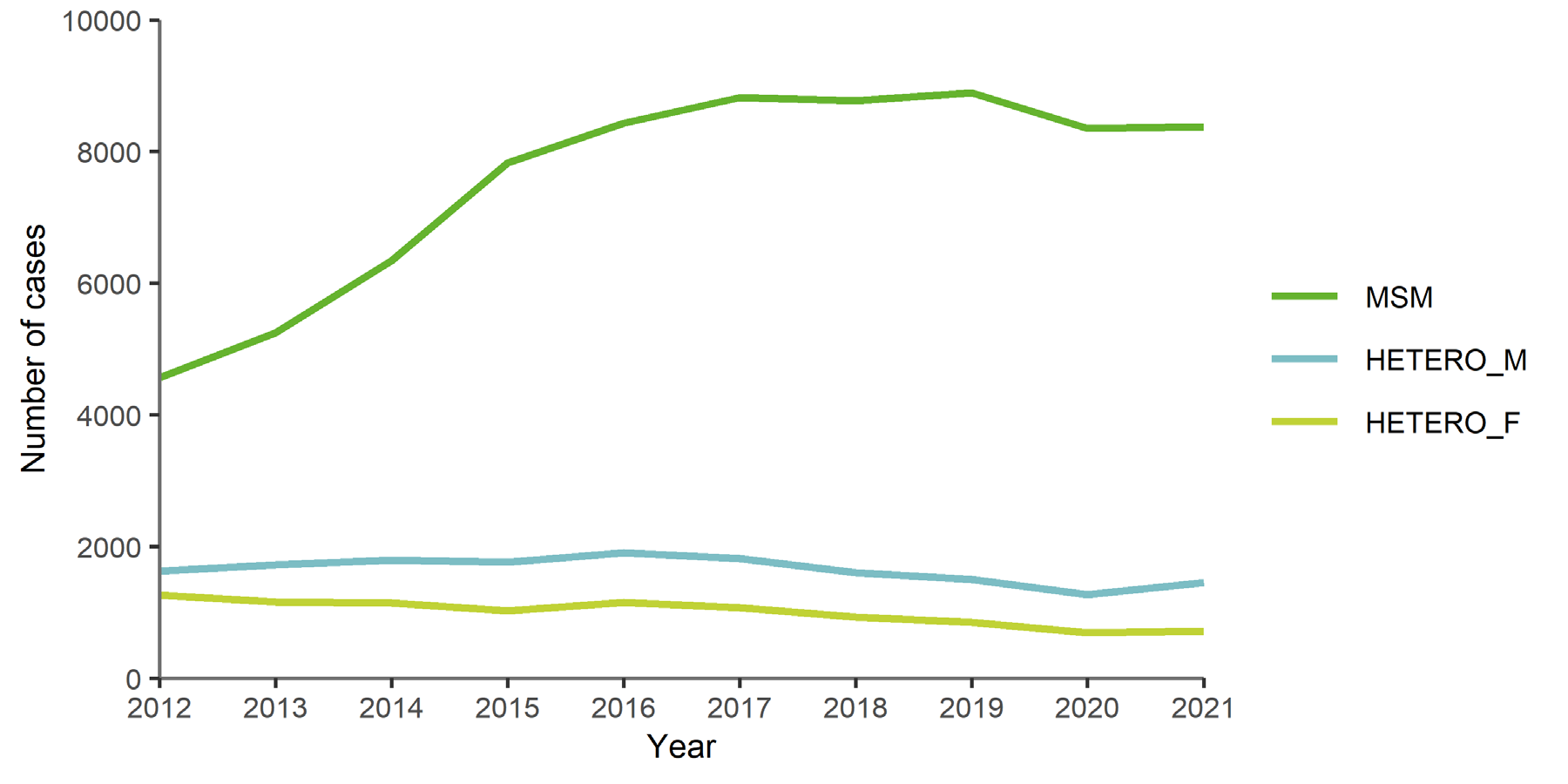
Syphilis cases by gender, transmission category and year in EU/EEA countries reporting consistently, 2012–2021

In 2021, twenty-eight EU/EEA countries reported 25,270 confirmed syphilis cases, giving an overall notification rate of 7.0 per 100,000 population, up from 6.0 in 2015.

The majority (77%) of cases with information on transmission category were reported in men who have sex with men (MSM), consistent with the global trend. This is up from 62% in 2015.

By age, 62% of cases belonged collectively to two groups: 25–34 years and 45 years or above. Young people aged 15–24 accounted for 12% of reported cases.

Within the region, the country with the highest rate of reported cases was Malta at 32.2 per 100,000 population, while the lowest number was reported from Croatia, at 0.9 per 100,000 people.

The number of HIV co-infections remains a prevalent issue with a worsening trend, especially in the "men who have sex with men" transmission category.

== India ==
Rates of congenital syphilis have decreased between the 1980 and 2000s due to better access to prenatal care. A five-year study among 250 patients in each year among attendees in an STI clinic in West Bengal found significantly decreased(p<0.05) Syphilis prevalence from 10.8% (in 2004) to 3.6% (in 2008). A study conducted in 2015 found a falling trend of syphilis in STI clinic attendees, but a rising trend in intro-venus drug users, pregnant women, HIV-seropositive individuals, and patients from other wards and OPD's. This study was conducted at a tertiary care center so the results may not reflect the true prevalence of syphilis in the country.

== United States ==
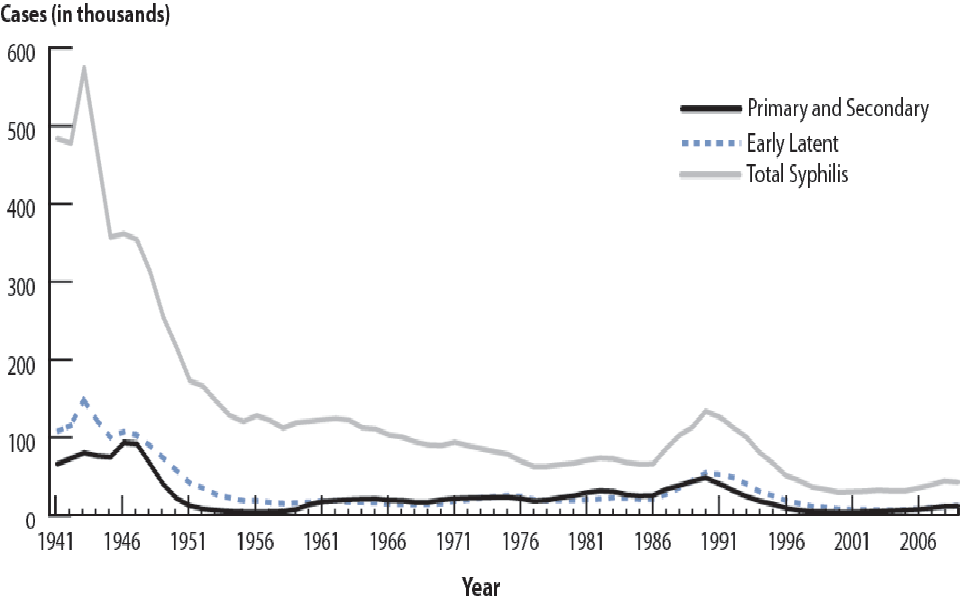
Syphilis—Reported Cases by Stage of Infection, United States, 1941–2009.

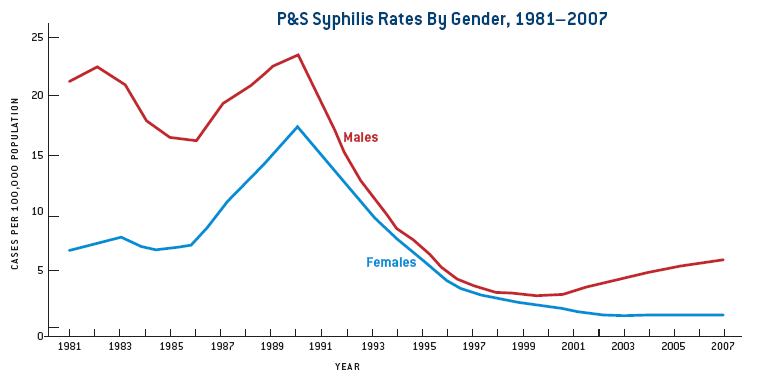
Rates of syphilis by gender in the United States.

In the United States rates of syphilis have increased among men between 2000 and 2007. Rates are six times greater in men than women and seven times greater in African Americans than Caucasians. More than 60% of cases are in men who have sex with men. It occurs most commonly in those between 15 and 40 years of age.

In the United States, rates of syphilis as of 2007 were six times greater in men than women while they were nearly equal in 1997. Rates are also greater in African Americans and Hispanics than in Caucasians.

According to a report from the Centers for Disease Control and Prevention, between 2000 and 2016, the rising rates of primary and secondary syphilis were attributed to men, mostly who have sex with men, no matter how they identify. However, since 2013, according to the same report, rates among men and women have increased. These increases were in every region within the United States and across racial identities as well. The groups with the highest rates in 2016 were men aged 20–34, men from the western region of the United States, and black men. In 2016, there were 27,814 reported cases of syphilis, primary and secondary, in the United States, a 17.6% increase from the previous year and a 74% increase from the reported cases in 2012.

Primary and secondary syphilis have a high correlation to an HIV-coinfection, particularly in men who have sex with men (MSM). In 2016, in cases with a known HIV-status, 47% of men who had sex with men were HIV-positive along with their syphilis infections. The rates among men who have sex with women (MSW) and women were much lower at 10.7% (MSW) and 41.% (women).

Cases of congenital syphilis have been increasingly rising in the 2010s. The Centers for Disease Control and Prevention (CDC) reported 918 cases for 2017, what is more than twice the figures of four years earlier. CDC data shows that in 2020, 134,000 cases of syphilis were reported in the United States, rising to 176,000 in 2021, a large jump from the rate of syphilis recorded in the early 2000s, where only about 30,000 cases per year were registered. Reports in 2023 show a rise of more than 900 percent in Mississippi over five years.

== Reemergence ==
=== China ===
China had a great deal of syphilis during the first part of the 20th century and basically eliminated it from 1960 to 1980. During the 1950s China was believed to have one of the worst cases of syphilis in human history. Different surveillance programs determined that 84% of Chinese prostitutes had the infection and as many as 5% of citizens had the disease in large cities.

The communist government under Mao Zedong, in response to the syphilis epidemic, issued free treatment for all those infected and increased screening for the disease. In the 1960s it was found that syphilis was almost completely eradicated in ChinaRecent studies show evidence that the disease has seen a resurgence. In a study entitled "Syphilis in China: Results of a National Surveillance Program", researchers found that during 1993 the number of cases of reported syphilis was 0-2 per 100,000. During a national surveillance program in 2005 there were found to be 5-7 cases per 100,000 throughout the country. In that same study it showed that the city with the most prevalence of syphilis was Shanghai, with an estimated 55 patients with syphilis per 100,000 citizens. The second highest was Zhejiang, which had approximately 35 people with syphilis per 100,000; the third was Fujian, which had 28 patients per 100,000.

All of these cities are on the southeastern edge of the country, facing the ocean. The greatest increase in syphilis is in female sex workers, drug users, and gay men. According to an article published in The Lancet titled "Syphilis Resurgent in China", the main cause of syphilis being more prevalent in China is due to the recent economic growth of China and increased globalization, which has caused an increase of the sex trade, internal and external migration, and a bigger economic inequality among its citizens.

Something else that is credited is that China's earlier efforts to control the disease helped increase the susceptibility of citizens to the disease. China's increase in syphilis is not self-contained; Russia, the United Kingdom, Ireland, and the United States have all seen a great increase in patients with syphilis recently.

=== Russia ===
Russia is one of the main areas around the world that has been affected by the syphilis epidemic. An article titled "Epidemics of syphilis in the Russian Federation: trends, origins, and priorities for control", published in The Lancet, discussed syphilis trends in Russia. Like China, Russia basically eliminated the disease during the 1960s, though there was a slight increase during 1978 and 1979 with an estimated 28 cases per 100,000. The rate dropped slightly only to rise between 1988, where there were four patients per 100,000 citizens, to 263 patients per 100,000 in 1996, which is 62 times more than it had been.

The most commonly affected individuals are found to be young men and women. It is also reported that the estimated number of patients in Russia with syphilis who do not report their disease rose from around 0% in 1989 to 30% in 1993.

Many of the reasons for this increase in syphilis within Russia stem from political restructuring and a declining economy, causing many people's standard of living to decline. The gross national income of the country dropped about 12% between 1990 and 1994. The government funding of health services and social institutions went down and in turn caused fewer people to receive treatment for syphilis. This broad decline in the economy within Russia also led to an increase in the crossing of the country's borders, causing a mixing of surrounding area and more migration within and outside of Russia. In Moscow especially, a lot of travel has been done between other large cities. This increase in travel is similar to China's recent increase in travel. Both have increased the number of sexual encounters with prostitutes and varied ideas of sexual ideology.

Russia right now is focused on making an increase in prevention and treatment programs throughout the country, making sure that the lower class of people have access to medical services and many health promotions are being made.

=== Western Europe ===
The United Kingdom and other parts of Western Europe have also seen a major increase in syphilis in recent times. A study called "Are trends in HIV, gonorrhea, and syphilis worsening in western Europe?" in a journal of medicine called BMJ outlines the data collected from 1995 to 2000 on sexually transmitted infections throughout western Europe. As with Russia and China there was a big decline in syphilis before 1980 but a big resurgence during the 1990s.

Another major way of spreading the disease is the sharing of needles between drug users.

England and Wales saw a slight drop and then increase of syphilis cases between 1995 and 2000 and a drastic increase in syphilis contraction through homosexual men in 2000. The increase in Western Europe can be attributed to the practice of unprotected sex and young people are having more sex than they have had in the past. Due to a lack of modern surveillance programs and various governments in Europe there is not definitive data to show how prevalent the spread of syphilis is throughout every country in Western Europe.

=== United States ===
The United States mirrored the global trend with a sharp increase in syphilis during the 1990s up till the present. The United States saw a big decrease in the number of cases in the 1950s, with only around 6500 cases were reported per year, which was statistically about what other countries were seeing at the time. This continued with a varying increase around the 1960s and 1970s with around 19,000 and 26,000 cases per year up until the beginning of the 1990s. The Centers for Disease Control and Prevention (CDC) published their findings in 2013 with 19,738,800 almost 15% of those were from syphilis. It has been found that men and women are equally as likely to have syphilis in the United States. It is thought that the number of new cases of syphilis along with the current amount is around 117,000 people have syphilis in the United States.

In 2022, the Rosebud reservation in South Dakota started reporting a rise in infant syphilis cases. Data revealed cases increased multiple folds starting from 2020 when rates were comparable to the US overall rate. In 2023, 3% of all Native American babies born in South Dakota were infected with the disease, and tribal leaders claimed rates of infection of all indigenous people in the great plains now the higher than any other rates in the US since 1941.

To combat the increase in syphilis and other various sexually transmitted infections, the United States focuses on prevention programs where the focus is on practicing safe sex and being aware of whether ones partner has syphilis. Pregnant women, which have a high risk of infecting their children, are required to take syphilis screening and given treatment if they are found to be carrying the disease.

=== Modern travel and the Internet ===
All of these countries have in common a theme of travel in between countries which increases how prevalent and far reaching the disease can reach. Not only is travel linked to the reemergence of syphilis but also the Internet has been a major factor in syphilis being transferred from person to person. A study done in 2000 titled "Tracing a Syphilis Outbreak Through Cyberspace" published in The Journal of the American Medical Association shows that Internet chat rooms increase the frequency of sexual contact between people, especially those of gay men.

In a specific outbreak in San Francisco gay men with syphilis were found to be a lot more probable to have met their significant other through the Internet. The ratio was found to be that 67% of the men met their partner through an Internet chat room and only 19% of those with reported syphilis were not linked to the Internet.

The Internet is a global force that facilitates sexual encounters among people which spreads the disease to many people who otherwise would not be in contact with syphilis.

=== Global impacts ===
This global re-emergence of syphilis is a major problem for every country affected. According to a study titled "Global Prevalence and Incidence Estimates of Selectable Curable STD's" in a journal named Sex Transm Inf the number of syphilis cases reported within the 9 main UN territories in 1995 was roughly around 12 million cases. The main population that was reported to have the disease was the people who were lower in the economy and younger people are reported to have more of the disease than older people.

Out of the nine UN regions that were surveyed the region that syphilis was the most prevalent was south and south eastern Asia. The second highest was found to be in the sub Saharan parts of Africa and the third highest was Latin America and the Caribbean areas. This study in 1995 was one of the first big attempts by the World Health Organization to find a good estimate of the total population of people with syphilis and other STIs.

Studies by the World Health Organization pinpoint how prevalent syphilis is globally. An article called "Congenital syphilis re-emerging" in a medical journal titled JDDG outlines the World Health Organizations findings as recently as 2008. It is estimated that globally 12 million people acquire the disease every year and of these 12 million patients 2 million are pregnant women. This high number of pregnant women with the disease estimates that it will cause about 50% of the pregnancies to result in stillbirth or prenatal death. The World Health Organization estimates that syphilis in within the mother can cause syphilis in the baby between 713,600 cases and 1,575,000 cases.

=== Eradication ===
Because of the increased numbers of patients globally there have been many initiatives to prevent the spread of the disease and there has been a global effort to eradicate the disease. An article titled "A Road Map for the Global Elimination of Congenital Syphilis" within a medical journal called Obstetrics and Gynecology International outlines the global efforts to combat congenital syphilis mostly dealing with the World Health Organization. Many of the efforts are focused on screening women who are pregnant for the disease and treating them. Of the two million pregnancies each year that test positive for syphilis they make up 1.5% of every pregnancy throughout the world. In 2007, the World Health Organization estimated that in the countries that are affected most by congenital syphilis, it would cost roughly 3 to 4 million dollars to start a program that could potentially eliminate most of the threat of congenital syphilis by focusing a lot more on screening and treatment.

Countries in Sub-Saharan Africa find it difficult to implement these kinds of treatment due to a lack of health services for their citizens which in turn makes this area a big breeding ground for congenital syphilis and the spread of syphilis through sexual contact. The World Health Organization outlines a four-pillar plan that could help countries eliminate or at least decrease the numbers of cases of congenital syphilis. The four pillars are "ensure advocacy and sustained political commitment for a successful health initiative, increase access to, and quality of, maternal and newborn health services, screen and treat pregnant women and partners, and establish surveillance, monitoring, and evaluation systems." The United Nations has also added goals related to the lowering of syphilis which they call the Millennium Development Goals. These goals include reducing infant death from syphilis and increasing the health of mothers with syphilis. The United Nations have taken steps to include on site screening and testing for syphilis among other sexually transmitted infections along with an increase in partner notification.

== See also ==
- Syphilis in Africa
