= Ditzel =

Ditzel is a German surname. Notable people with the surname include:

- Filip Ditzel (born 1985), Czech track cyclist
- Liz Ditzel, professor of nursing in New Zealand
- Meta Ditzel (1910-1999), Danish politician
- Nanna Ditzel (1923–2005), Danish furniture designer
