= Clinical and Experimental Pharmacology and Physiology =

- Discipline: Pharmacology, physiology
- Language: English
- Edited by: Roger Evans, Ding-Feng Su

Publication details
- Former name: Proceedings of the Australian Society for Medical Research
- History: 1974–present
- Publisher: Blackwell Science (Australia)
- Frequency: Monthly
- Impact factor: 2.372 (2014)

Standard abbreviations
- ISO 4: Clin. Exp. Pharmacol. Physiol.

Indexing
- CODEN: CEXPB9
- ISSN: 0305-1870
- OCLC no.: 32562719

Links
- Journal homepage; Online access

Clinical and Experimental Pharmacology and Physiology is a peer-reviewed scientific journal that publishes articles relating to pharmacology and physiology.

== Abstracting and indexing ==
- Academic Search
- Abstracts in Anthropology
- Elsevier BIOBASE
- CAB Abstracts
- Chemical Abstracts Service
- Current Contents/ Clinical Medicine
- Dairy Science Abstracts
- Medline
- Forestry Abstracts
- Global Health
- Journal Citation Reports/ Science Edition
- Science Citation Index
- Tropical Diseases Bulletin
- Weed Abstracts
