= Australian Systematic Botany =

Peer-reviewed scientific journal

- Discipline: Botany
- Language: English
- Edited by: Daniel Murphy

Publication details
- History: Brunonia (1978–1987); Australian Systematic Botany (1988–present)
- Publisher: CSIRO Publishing (Australia)
- Frequency: Bimonthly
- Impact factor: 0.648 (2015)

Standard abbreviations
- ISO 4: Aust. Syst. Bot.

Indexing
- ISSN: 1030-1887 (print); 1446-5701 (web)
- OCLC no.: 18489688

Links
- Journal homepage

Australian Systematic Botany is an international peer-reviewed scientific journal published by CSIRO Publishing. It is devoted to publishing original research, and sometimes review articles, on topics related to systematic botany, such as biogeography, taxonomy and evolution. The journal is broad in scope, covering all plant, algal and fungal groups, including fossils.

First published in 1978 as Brunonia, the journal adopted its current name in 1988.

The current editor-in-chief is Daniel Murphy (Royal Botanic Gardens Melbourne).

== Abstracting and indexing ==
The journal is abstracted and indexed in BIOSIS, CAB Abstracts, Current Contents (Agriculture, Biology & Environmental Sciences), Elsevier BIOBASE, Kew Index, Science Citation Index and Scopus.

== Impact factor ==
According to the Journal Citation Reports, the journal has a 2015 impact factor of 0.648.
