= Birds of the Indonesian Archipelago =

2016 ornithological handbook

Birds of the Indonesian Archipelago: Greater Sundas and Wallacea
- Author: James Eaton, Bas van Balen, Nick Brickle, & Frank Rheindt
- Publisher: Lynx Edicions
- Publication date: 2016
- Publication place: Barcelona
- Pages: 496
- ISBN: 978-84-941892-6-5

Birds of the Indonesian Archipelago: Greater Sundas and Wallacea is an ornithological handbook by the ornithologists James A. Eaton, Bas van Balen, Nick W. Brickle, and Frank E. Rheindt. The first edition of the handbook was published in 2016 and covered 1,417 species across most of the archipelago comprising Indonesia, including the entirety of the islands of Timor and Borneo, but excluding New Guinea. A second edition of the book was published in 2021 and included 1,456 species, including several species newly described since the publication of the first edition.

== Publication history ==
The first edition of the Birds of the Indonesian Archipelago was published by Lynx Edicions in 2016. 496 pages long, it included an introduction covering the biogeography and ornithological history of Indonesia, information on conservation in the region, and an in-depth section on taxonomy and systematics justifying the rather novel taxonomic arrangement followed by the authors. This is followed by 446 pages of species accounts, maps, and plates, which cover 1,417 species. The text accounts of each species are located on the verso and the illustrations and maps are located on the recto. An updated second edition, covering 1,456 species, was published in 2021, with revised taxonomy, artwork, and maps.

== Reception ==
Reception for the first edition of the book was largely positive, with praise focusing on its breadth of coverage, depth of scholarship, relatively compact size, and well-illustrated slides. Many reviewers also noted that it was the first field guide to cover nearly the entire Indonesian archipelago (from the Greater Sundas to Wallacea, excluding only Papua), and that previous field guides for the region were largely outdated at the time of its publication. However, reviewers also identified several shortcomings in the guide.

In a review in Emu, K. D. Bishop, the author of the earlier A Guide to the Birds of Wallacea, commended the book for its depth and breadth of coverage, calling it an important addition to Indonesian ornithology. However, he criticised several of the editorial decisions taken by the authors, including their taxonomic treatment, selection of maps and illustrations, and the usability of the index, seeing them as reducing the usability of the guide. He was especially critical of the "radical" changes in taxonomy and English common names adopted in the book.

Frank Lambert, writing in a review for Kukila, called the guide "outstanding" and noted that it was sorely needed due to the paucity and outdated nature of the field guides covering the region. He noted the issues with the lack of granularity in the maps and the confusion caused by common name changes, but was less critical of the taxonomy adopted by the authors, stating that most of it was likely to be "widely adopted as valid within a few years’ time". Graham Fulton, reviewing the book in Pacific Conservation Biology, was largely positive, stating that despite issues with the taxonomy and index, "it [would] be very long time before it is surpassed [or] superseded". Neil Calbrade, writing for the British Trust for Ornithology, also praised the book as being "superb" and called it the "region’s standard field guide for many years to come".

Lambert, reviewing the second edition in 2021, noted that despite being published only four years after the first edition, it was significantly different and a worthwhile uograde. He especially noted the updated taxonomy, new maps covering specific island groups alongside the archipelago-wide one, and the provision of Indonesian common names for species. A review by Hillstar Nature was similarly laudatory, saying that the guide comes "makes...[me] come close to salivating".
