= Discover Applied Sciences =

- Discipline: Applied science
- Language: English
- Edited by: Thomas von Larcher

Publication details
- Former name: SN Applied Sciences
- History: 2019–present
- Publisher: Springer Science+Business Media
- Frequency: Monthly
- Open access: Yes
- License: CC BY
- Impact factor: 3.8 (2025)

Standard abbreviations
- ISO 4: Discov. Appl. Sci.

Indexing
- CODEN: SASNBO
- ISSN: 2523-3971
- OCLC no.: 1101815428

Links
- Journal homepage; Online archive

Discover Applied Sciences, formerly known as SN Applied Sciences is a peer-reviewed scientific journal that publishes papers from all areas of applied science. It was established in 2019 and is published by Springer Science+Business Media. The journal publishes research articles, reviews, case studies, and short communications. The senior editor is Thomas von Larcher.

== Abstracting and indexing ==
The journal is abstracted and indexed in:

- Ei Compendex
- Emerging Sources Citation Index
- Food Science & Technology Abstracts
- Inspec
- Scopus
