= Karole Hogarth =

Professor of nursing in New Zealand

Karole Jeanette Hogarth

Academic background
- Education: University of Otago
- Thesis: A role for Oxytocin in normal human prostate cell proliferation and steroid metabolism: a model for benign prostatic Hyperplasia (2009)

Karole Jeanette Hogarth (also known as Karole Hogarth-Caulfield) is a New Zealand academic, and is a full professor and Head of Nursing at Otago Polytechnic. She researchers interprofessional education and health curriculum development.

== Academic career ==
Hogarth is a registered nurse, and also completed a PhD titled A role for Oxytocin in normal human prostate cell proliferation and steroid metabolism: a model for benign prostatic Hyperplasia at the University of Otago in 2009. Hogarth then joined the faculty of the Otago Polytechnic, where as of 2024 she is a full professor and also Head of the School of Nursing. Hogarth serves as the Māori representative to the Otago Polytechnic Postgraduate Research ethics committee.

Hogarth's research focuses on interprofessional health education, but she is also interested in curriculum development and educational outcomes for Māori students. She collaborated with colleagues Claire Goode, Liz Ditzel, and Jean Ross to investigate the use of video in health education, which was published as a chapter in the 2021 Springer book Video Pedagogy: Theory and Practice, edited by Dilani Gedera and Arezou Zalipour. Hogarth is also involved in an international project on education for interprofessional teachers.

Hogarth served as a member of the reference group established by the Prime Minister's Chief Science Advisor, Juliet Gerrard, on resistance to antimicrobials in infectious diseases. She has also commented that paid practicum work for nursing students would help lower the drop-out rates from Bachelor of Nursing degree courses.

== Selected works ==
- Kate Whittington; Belinda Connors; Keith King; Steve Assinder; Hogarth, Karole Jeanette; Helen Nicholson (2007). "The effect of oxytocin on cell proliferation in the human prostate is modulated by gonadal steroids: implications for benign prostatic hyperplasia and carcinoma of the prostate". The Prostate. 67 (10): 1132–1142. doi:10.1002/pros.20612. PMID 17492653. Wikidata Q40134635.
- Hogarth, Karole Jeanette; K. King; S. J. Assinder; H. D. Nicholson (2003). "70. The localisation of oxytocin and oxytocin receptor in normal human prostate cells". Reproduction, Fertility and Development. 15 (9): 70. doi:10.1071/srb03ab70. Wikidata Q126666745.
- Hogarth, Karole Jeanette; K. King; H. D. Nicholson (2005). "307. The effect of oxytocin on cell growth and steroid production in normal human prostate cells in vitro". Reproduction, Fertility and Development. 17 (9): 131. doi:10.1071/srb05abs307. Wikidata Q126666747.
- Ditzel, Elizabeth Mary; Hogarth, Karole Jeanette; Lesa, Raewyn (2017). "Immersive learning in nursing education: Results of a study". Journal of Nursing Education and Practice. 7 (5): 120. doi:10.5430/jnep.v7n5p120. Wikidata Q126667148.
- Donna Burkett; Hogarth, Karole Jeanette (2020), Developing A Contemporary Curriculum For Undergraduate Nursing Learner Success, pp. 94–103, doi:10.34074/scop.4009002, Wikidata Q126667150
- Goode, Claire; Ditzel, Elizabeth Mary; Ross, Jean; Hogarth, Karole Jeanette (2021). "Building Undergraduate Nursing Knowledge and Practice Through Video". pp. 21–41. doi:10.1007/978-981-33-4009-1_2. Wikidata Q126667152 http://dx.doi.org/10.1007/978-981-33-4009-1_2.
