= Sexual health (disambiguation) =

Sexual health refers to Reproductive health. It may also refer to:

- Sexual Health (journal)
- International Journal of Sexual Health
