= Syphilis in Africa =

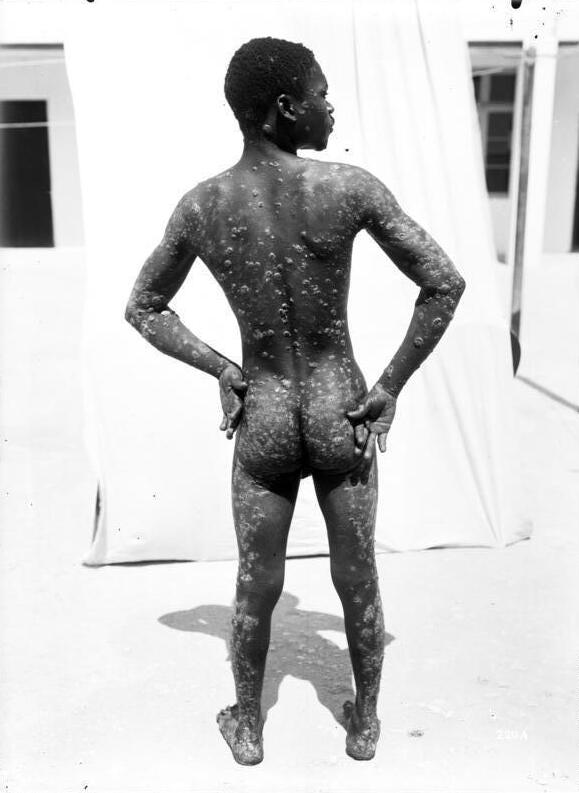
Man with syphilis in German East Africa, c. early 1900s

Syphilis, a sexually transmitted infection, is a major danger to public health, particularly in developing countries, including those in Africa. The disease, whose origin is contested amongst researchers, arrived on the continent no later than the 16th century. Since then, it has spread to individuals across Africa. It heavily affects pregnant women, who can end up miscarrying or giving birth to a child already infected. Its relationship with factors such as circumcision, education, and the availability of screening have all been researched.

== History ==
=== Origin ===
Treponemal diseases, which include syphilis, most likely originated in East Africa. Where syphilis itself first emerged is debated, with some researchers supporting a New World origin theory, and others an Old World one. It was confirmed in Africa by 1520. There is evidence indicating this arrival may have been along the East African coast. Among the Bantu peoples, it did not appear until later, brought by settlers at Cape Town. While marital and sexual relations between European men and Bantu women were forbidden, they still frequently occurred, leading to the illness' introduction among South Africa's natives.

=== Colonial era ===
According to Colonel F.J. Lambkin of the Royal Army Medical Corps, in the land that eventually became the Protectorate of Uganda, the Baganda people originally tightly restricted the sexual activity of women. By 1908, after colonization by the British and the introduction of Christianity, these restrictions were removed by the newly-Christianized chiefs, as they were considered incompatible with new religion. Lambkin cited this action and the deliberate introduction of syphilis into healthy infants, as it was believed this would vaccinate them, as reasons for the sudden spread of the illness throughout the colony.

In the 1950s, significant efforts were initiated to use the drug penicillin against the disease in the Colony of Niger of French West Africa. The goal was not to eradicate it, but to weaken its overall prevalence.

== Prevalence ==
Syphilis is a severe public health issue in developing countries. Over 10 million people are afflicted, mainly in sub-Saharan Africa and Asia. In the former, data gathered in 2019 from numerous studies concluded a total prevalence of about 2.9% among pregnant women. Pregnant women in East and Southern Africa typically ran higher, with respectively averages of 3.2% and 3.6%. It appeared to have decreased some over the previous 20 years (except in the East), but not significantly.

In Kisumu, Kenya, in a 2001 study, men that were circumcised (27.5%, including nearly all Muslims) were less likely to have HSV-2 infection and syphilis. The main ethnic group of that city, the Luo, do not traditionally practice circumcision. By contrast, the same study found no significant difference in the prevalence of either STI between circumcised and uncircumcised men in Ndola, Zambia.

Another study which occurred earlier that year, this one of rural communities in the Mwanza Region of Tanzania, found a general prevalence of 7.5% in men and 9.1% in women, although younger males (between 15 and 19 years old) had a 2.0% rate, while younger females in the same age range had a 6.6% rate. In both men and women, it was most common among the divorced and widowed. In men specifically, its prevalence correlated to being uncircumcised, practicing traditional religion, and having five partners or more over the last year. In women, it correlated with a lack of primary education, an early sexual debut, and the self perception of a high STI risk.

== Effects ==
The disease results in genital sores, as well as abscesses and ulcers over the rest of the body and intense pain. Pregnant women are capable of transferring the disease to infants (around 33% of the time), so many children are born already infected. In 1986, in Zambia, 19% of miscarriages were due to syphilis, while 5% of all pregnancies in Ethiopia were lost because of the STI. Lack of screening has caused this to continue to more recent times; in 2016, pregnant sub-Saharan African women still frequently suffered high rates of stillbirth and neonatal death in countries where syphilis-screening was limited, such as Chad, Ethiopia, Niger, Nigeria, and Sudan.

== Awareness ==
In a survey of adults in Tanzania's Moshi Urban District, awareness of syphilis, along with HIV/AIDS and gonorrhea, was found to be high, although other STIs, such as herpes, were less familiar. The survey also found that while men who knew of the afflictions were not necessarily more likely to have them, the same could not be said for women, who had twice as high a chance of testing positive for an STI when they claimed to be aware of them. The total percentages for syphilis were a 91% awareness among men and 75% awareness among women.

Screening is often not well implemented in sub-Saharan African countries. In Burkina Faso, for example, many pregnant women do not receive testing even when available, for reasons including lack of knowledge of the effects of syphilis, distance to screening facilities, stigma against STIs, and the cost of receiving screening. Despite these setbacks, the use of immunochromatographic strips for testing is cost-effective overall.

== See also ==
- Epidemiology of syphilis
- HIV/AIDS in Africa
