= International Union against Sexually Transmitted Infections =

Non-governmental organization

The International Union against Sexually Transmitted Infections (IUSTI) is a non-governmental organisation established in 1923, and has charitable status in the UK. It produces guidelines for Europe on the management of sexually transmitted infections and is organisation in consultative status with the WHO. It also provides training and management in the field of STIs, publishes an STI textbook, and publishes the journal Sexual Health. It also runs conferences, such as IUSTI Europe Congress (as of 2024, 36 annual conferences) and the IUSTI World Congress (as of 2024, 24) and many other regional meetings.
