= Reproduction, Fertility and Development =

- Discipline: Reproductive Medicine
- Language: English
- Edited by: Graeme Martin

Publication details
- History: Established 1989, Continues in part: Australia journal of biological sciences. Continues: Clinical reproduction and fertility
- Publisher: CSIRO Publishing (Australia)
- Frequency: Monthly
- Impact factor: 1.723 (2018)

Standard abbreviations
- ISO 4: Reprod. Fertil. Dev.

Indexing
- ISSN: 1031-3613 (print); 1448-5990 (web)

Links
- Journal homepage

Reproduction, Fertility and Development is an international peer-reviewed scientific journal published by CSIRO Publishing. The journal publishes original and significant contributions on vertebrate reproductive and developmental biology. Subject areas include, but are not limited to: physiology, biochemistry, cell and molecular biology, endocrinology, genetics and epigenetics, behaviour, immunology and the development of reproductive technologies in humans, livestock and wildlife, and in pest management.

The current editor-in-chief is Graeme Martin (University of Western Australia).

== Abstracting and indexing ==
The journal is abstracted and indexed in ABOA/Streamline, Australasian Medical Index, Elsevier BIOBASE, Biological Abstracts, BIOSIS, CAB Abstracts, Chemical Abstracts, Current Contents (Agriculture, Biology & Environmental Sciences), Current Contents (Life Sciences), Excerpta Medica/Embase, Index Medicus, MEDLINE, Reference Update, Science Citation Index, Scopus and Zoological Record.

== Impact factor ==
According to the Journal Citation Reports, the journal has a 2018 impact factor of 1.723.
