= Australian Mammalogy =

- Discipline: Mammalogy
- Language: English
- Edited by: Ross Goldingay

Publication details
- History: 1972–present
- Publisher: CSIRO Publishing on behalf of the Australian Mammal Society (Australia)
- Frequency: Biannually
- Impact factor: 0.872 (2015)

Standard abbreviations
- ISO 4: Aust. Mammal.

Indexing
- ISSN: 0310-0049 (print); 1836-7402 (web)

Links
- Journal homepage; Online access; Online archive

Australian Mammalogy is a major peer-reviewed scientific journal published by CSIRO Publishing on behalf of the Australian Mammal Society covering research on the biology of mammals that are native or introduced to Australasia. Subject areas include, but are not limited to: anatomy, behaviour, developmental biology, ecology, evolution, genetics, molecular biology, parasites and diseases of mammals, physiology, reproductive biology, systematics and taxonomy.

The current Editor is Ross Goldingay (Southern Cross University).

== Abstracting and indexing ==
The journal is abstracted by BIOSIS Previews, ELIXIR, Endanger (Threatened Species), GeoRef, Science Citation Index, Scopus, STREAMLINE (Natural Resources) and Zoological Record.

== Impact factor ==
According to the Journal Citation Reports, the journal has a 2015 impact factor of 0.872.
