= Sexual Health (journal) =

- Discipline: Sexual health
- Language: English
- Edited by: Jason Ong, Joseph Tucker

Publication details
- History: 2004–present
- Publisher: CSIRO Publishing (Australia)
- Frequency: Bimonthly
- Open access: Hybrid
- Impact factor: 1.8 (2023)

Standard abbreviations
- ISO 4: Sex. Health

Indexing
- ISSN: 1448-5028 (print); 1449-8987 (web)

Links
- Journal homepage

Sexual Health is a bimonthly peer-reviewed academic journal covering the fields of sexual and reproductive health research, including HIV, sexually transmitted infections, sexuality, sexual satisfaction, and related topics. It is the official journal of the International Union against Sexually Transmitted Infections, Asia-Pacific, and the Asia-Oceania Federation of Sexology. The editors-in-chief are Jason Ong and Joseph D. Tucker.

== Abstracting and indexing ==
The journal is abstracted and indexed in:

- Applied Social Sciences Index and Abstracts
- Australasian Medical Index
- CAB Abstracts
- CINAHL
- Current Contents/Clinical Medicine
- Current Contents/Social & Behavioural Sciences
- EBSCO databases
- Embase
- ProQuest databases
- MEDLINE/PubMed
- Science Citation Index Expanded
- Scopus
- Social Sciences Citation Index
- Social Services Abstracts
- Sociological Abstracts
