= Environmental Chemistry (journal) =

- Discipline: Environmental chemistry
- Language: English
- Edited by: Jamie Lead

Publication details
- History: 2004-present
- Publisher: CSIRO Publishing
- Frequency: 8/year
- Impact factor: 4.3 (2022)

Standard abbreviations
- ISO 4: Environ. Chem.

Indexing
- CODEN: ECNHAA
- ISSN: 1448-2517 (print); 1449-8979 (web)
- OCLC no.: 862992386

Links
- Journal homepage

Environmental Chemistry is a peer-reviewed scientific journal published by CSIRO Publishing. It covers all aspects of environmental chemistry, including atmospheric chemistry, (bio)geochemistry, climate change, marine chemistry, water chemistry, polar chemistry, fire chemistry, astrochemistry, earth and geochemistry, soil and sediment chemistry, and chemical toxicology. The editor-in-chief is Jamie Lead (University of South Carolina).

== Abstracting and indexing ==
The journal is abstracted and indexed in:

- Biological Abstracts
- BIOSIS Previews
- CAB Abstracts
- Chemical Abstracts Service
- Current Contents/Agriculture, Biology & Environmental Sciences
- Current Contents/Physical Chemical & Earth Sciences
- Science Citation Index Expanded
- Scopus

According to the Journal Citation Reports, the journal has a 2017 impact factor of 2.923.

== See also ==
- Australian Journal of Chemistry
- List of scientific journals in chemistry
