= CSIRO Publishing =

Australian science publisher

- Parent company: Commonwealth Scientific and Industrial Research Organisation (CSIRO)
- Founded: 1995
- Country of origin: Australia
- Headquarters location: Clayton, Victoria
- Distribution: NewSouth Books (Australia); Eurospan (EMEA); Stylus Publishing (the Americas)
- Publication types: journals, books, magazines, training
- Official website: www.publish.csiro.au

CSIRO Publishing is an Australian-based science and technology publisher. It publishes books, journals and magazines across a range of scientific disciplines, including agriculture, chemistry, plant and animal sciences, natural history and environmental management. It also produces interactive learning modules for primary school students and provides writing workshops for researchers.

CSIRO Publishing operates within the Commonwealth Scientific and Industrial Research Organisation (CSIRO). It was established as a stand-alone business unit in 1995.

== Books ==
CSIRO Publishing publishes books in a number of categories, including:

- Animals: behaviour; birds; domesticated; ecology and management; field guides; fish; genetics and evolution; health and welfare; invasive; invertebrates; mammals and marsupials; reproduction and physiology; reptiles and amphibians; and wildlife.
- Built Environment: architecture; building; codes and standards; engineering; landscape architecture; and planning and design.
- Food and Agriculture: agribusiness; agroforestry; aquaculture; crops and pastures; farm management; food and beverages; landcare; livestock codes; livestock management; sustainability; viticulture; and weeds, pests and diseases.
- Gardening and Horticulture: fruit, vegetables and flowers; horticulture; native plants and gardens; sustainability; techniques and design; and trees, shrubs and grasses.
- Health: environmental health; general health; and nutrition.
- Marine and Freshwater: coastal science; fisheries and fishing; freshwater ecology; and marine ecology.
- Natural Environment: biodiversity and ecology; climate; energy; environmental management; fire; natural resources; policy and risk; pollution and waste; restoration ecology; soils; sustainability; and water.
- Physical Sciences: astronomy; chemistry; earth science; mathematics; mining and resources; physics; prehistory; and technology.
- Plant Science: algae and lichens; aquatic and marine plants; ecology and management; field and regional guides; flowering plants; grasses; identification and systematics; mosses and fungi; pathology; and physiology and chemistry.
- Science in Society: children's books; education; heritage and history; ideas and issues; Indigenous Australia; leisure and tourism; popular science; and populations.

== Authors ==
CSIRO Publishing authors include or have included:

- Michael Braby [The Complete Field Guide to Butterflies of Australia]
- Robin Brimblecombe, Kara Rosemeier [Positive Energy Homes]
- Harold Cogger [Reptiles and Amphibians of Australia]
- Stephen Debus [Birds of Prey of Australia]
- Roger Farrow [Insects of South-Eastern Australia]
- Michelle Gleeson [Miniature Lives]
- Jenny Gray [Zoo Ethics]
- Gisela Kaplan [Bird Minds]
- David Lindenmayer [environmental titles]
- Peter Menkhorst et al. The Australian Bird Guide
- Robert Whyte, Greg Anderson [A Field Guide to Spiders of Australia]

== Journals and magazines ==
CSIRO Publishing publishes the following journals and magazines:

- Animal Production Science
- Australian Health Review
- Australian Journal of Botany
- Australian Journal of Chemistry
- Australian Journal of Primary Health
- Australian Journal of Zoology
- Australian Mammalogy
- Australian Systematic Botany
- Crop and Pasture Science
- Double Helix
- Environmental Chemistry
- Exploration Geophysics
- Functional Plant Biology
- Health Promotion Journal of Australia
- Healthcare Infection (defunct)
- Historical Records of Australian Science
- International Journal of Wildland Fire
- Invertebrate Systematics
- Marine and Freshwater Research
- Microbiology Australia
- Pacific Conservation Biology
- Preview
- Proceedings of the Royal Society of Victoria
- Reproduction, Fertility and Development
- Sexual Health
- Soil Research
- The APPEA Journal
- The Rangeland Journal
- The South Pacific Journal of Natural Science
- Wildlife Research
