= Liz Ditzel =

New Zealand professor of nursing

- Other names: Elizabeth Mary Ditzel; Elizabeth Hall
- Awards: Ako Aotearoa Award for Sustained Excellence in Tertiary Teaching

Academic background
- Education: North West Anglia NHS Foundation Trust; University of Otago
- Thesis: A study of perceived occupational stress, burnout and sense of community among New Zealand nurses (2008)

Elizabeth Mary Ditzel (also Hall) is a New Zealand nursing academic, and is a full professor at the Otago Polytechnic, specialising in nursing education, curriculum development, and the use of new technology within the nursing curriculum.

== Academic career ==
Ditzel is a registered nurse, gaining her nursing qualifications through Peterborough and Stamford Hospitals NHS Foundation Trust in the UK. Ditzel also earned a Bachelor of Commerce and a Master of Commerce from the University of Otago. Ditzel worked as a nurse and nurse educator at Dunedin Public Hospital before becoming a lecturer in management at the University of Otago. She supervised more than forty postgraduate students, and completed a PhD titled A study of perceived occupational stress, burnout and sense of community among New Zealand nurses at the university in 2008. Ditzel then returned to nursing education, joining the faculty of Otago Polytechnic in 2010, and rising to full professor in 2019.

Ditzel is interested in the use of new technology in nursing education, and has investigated the use of mixed-reality education, standardised holographic patients, and methods for improving critical thinking and clinical reasoning in nursing students. She collaborated with colleagues Claire Goode, Karole Hogarth, and Jean Ross to investigate the use of video in health education, which was published as a chapter in the 2021 Springer book Video Pedagogy: Theory and Practice, edited by Dilani Gedera and Arezou Zalipour.

In 2017 Ditzel was awarded a national teaching award, an Ako Aotearoa Award for Sustained Excellence in Tertiary Teaching. The citation described her as "a ‘new paradigm’ thinker with a “modern approach”, committed to student-centred and innovative approaches to teaching and learning".

== Selected works ==
- Ditzel, Elizabeth Mary; Pavel Strach; Pirožek, Petr (2006). "An inquiry into good hospital governance: a New Zealand-Czech comparison". Health Research Policy and Systems. 4 (1): 2. doi:10.1186/1478-4505-4-2. PMC 1379643. PMID 16460571. Wikidata Q25255695.
- Josephine Crawley; Ditzel, Elizabeth Mary; Sue Walton (2012). "Using children's picture books for reflective learning in nurse education". Contemporary Nurse. 42 (1): 45–52. doi:10.5172/conu.2012.42.1.45. PMID 23050571. Wikidata Q50781114.
- L. Hall (2001). "Burnout: results of an empirical study of New Zealand nurses". Contemporary Nurse. 11 (1): 71–83. doi:10.5172/conu.11.1.71. PMID 11785867. Wikidata Q40666993.
- Emma Collins; Ditzel, Elizabeth Mary (2021). "Standardised Holographic Patients: An Evaluation of Their Role in Developing Clinical Reasoning Skills". Studies in Health Technology and Informatics. doi:10.3233/shti210687. ISSN 0926-9630. Wikidata Q130007925.
- Ditzel, Elizabeth Mary; Josie Crawley (2017). "What's in the box? A creative learning activity designed to develop critical thinking skills". Scope: Learning and Teaching. 3: 8–18. Wikidata Q130008745.
