= Research4Life =

- Formation: 2002
- Type: Non-profit
- Website: https://www.research4life.org/

Research4Life is a platform and website dedicated to providing access to academic and professional peer-reviewed knowledge public to students and researchers in over 200 low- and middle-income countries.

Since 2001, Research4Life has provided researchers at over 12,000 eligible non-profit institutions with free or low-cost access to over 250,000 leading journals, books and databases in the fields of health, agriculture, environment, applied sciences and legal information.

Free training is provided through the program itself and by partner organisations.

Research4Life does this in partnership with:

- UN agencies:
  - Food and Agriculture Organization (FAO)
  - International Labour Organization (ILO)
  - United Nations Environmental Programme (UNEP)
  - World Health Organization (WHO)
  - World Intellectual Property Organization (WIPO)
- Cornell University and Yale University
- International Association of Scientific, Technical and Medical Publishers (STM)
- and over 200 international publishers

The impact of the Research4Life program has been seen in increased scientific output, increased participation in international trials, and greater gender equity in science.

== Programs ==
Research4Life provides access to information through five programs:

- HINARI, research for health
- AGORA, research on agriculture
- ARDI, research for development and innovation
- OARE, research in the environment
- GOALI, research for global justice

== Organization ==
=== Governance ===
Research4Life is governed by an Executive Council which is responsible for strategic and operational decisions. Representatives are drawn from a diverse set of partner organisations, including but not limited to the major partners. These include intergovernmental agencies, academic and research institutions, university libraries, and publishers, such as WHO, FAO, ILO, UNEP, WIPO, STM, ITOCA, STM, Elsevier, Taylor & Francis Group, Yale University Library, and Cornell University Library.

The council comprises:

- Executive Group
- Elected Publisher Representatives
- Academic Library Representatives
- Program Managers
- User Representatives
- Chairs of the Working Groups

=== Working Groups ===
- Capacity Development
- Marketing and Communications
- Collection Strategy and Policy
- Eligibility
- Equity
- Finance Oversight
- Fundraising
- Technology
- User group
- Country Connectors

== Friends of Research4Life ==
In 2020, the partnership established Friends of Research4Life, a US-based 501(c)(3) charitable organization with an independent governance structure and Board of Directors, for fundraising.
