= ARDI =

ARDI is the Access to Research for Development and Innovation program, a partnership between the World Intellectual Property Organization and major scientific and technical publishers. ARDI provides access to nearly 10,000 online journals, books and reference works for patent offices, academic and research institutions in 107 developing and least developed countries as of December 2013. The stated objective of ARDI is to "promote the integration of developing countries into the global knowledge economy, allowing them to more fully realize their creative potential."

ARDI is part of Research4Life, the collective name for four programs - HINARI (focusing on health), AGORA (focusing on agriculture), OARE (focusing on environment), and ARDI (focusing on applied science and technology). Research4Life provides developing countries with free or low cost access to academic and professional peer-reviewed content online.

== History ==
ARDI was launched by the World Intellectual Property Organization in July 2009 in cooperation with 12 major publishers - American Association for the Advancement of Science; American Institute of Physics; Elsevier; Institute of Physics; John Wiley & Sons; Oxford University Press; National Academy of Sciences; Nature Publishing Group; Royal Society of Chemistry; Sage Publications; Springer Science+Business Media; and Taylor & Francis.

== Eligibility ==
Institutions eligible to participate in ARDI are: patent offices, academic institutions, and research institutions. All members of a registered institution (researchers, teaching and administrative staff, students) and its on-site visitors are eligible to use the resources to which access is provided through ARDI.
