= Historical Records of Australian Science =

- Discipline: History of science in Australia
- Language: English
- Edited by: Sara Maroske, Ian Rae

Publication details
- Former name(s): Records of Australian Academy of Science
- History: 1966-present
- Publisher: CSIRO Publishing (Australia)
- Frequency: Biannual
- Open access: Hybrid
- Impact factor: 0.333 (2019)

Standard abbreviations
- ISO 4: Hist. Rec. Aust. Sci.

Indexing
- CODEN: HRASEI
- ISSN: 0727-3061 (print); 1448-5508 (web)
- LCCN: 85643756
- OCLC no.: 50384589

Links
- Journal homepage; Online access; Online archive

Historical Records of Australian Science is a biannual peer-reviewed academic journal covering the history of science in Australia and the south-west Pacific and published by CSIRO Publishing on behalf of the Australian Academy of Science. It was established in 1966 as an irregular publication with the title Records of Australian Academy of Science, obtaining its current name in 1980. Since then, the journal has appeared annually and, since 1991, twice a year.

The editors-in-chief are Sara Maroske (Royal Botanic Gardens Melbourne) and Ian Rae (University of Melbourne).

== Abstracting and indexing ==
The journal is abstracted and indexed in:

- Arts & Humanities Citation Index
- Current Contents/Arts & Humanities
- Chemical Abstracts Service
- EBSCO databases
- ProQuest databases
- Scopus
- Social Sciences Citation Index

According to the Journal Citation Reports, the journal has a 2019 impact factor of 0.333.
