= Australian Science and Technology Heritage Centre =

Non-profit Organization in Australia

AustralianScience and Technology Heritage Centre
- Former names: Australian Science Archives Project

General information
- Status: Closed
- Location: University of Melbourne, Australia
- Closed: 2006
- Affiliation: University of Melbourne

The Australian Science and Technology Heritage Centre (Austehc), lasted from 1999 to 2006, was a non-profit organisation that received the majority of its funding from collaborative works with the government and industry groups. Austehc was a part of the Department of History and Philosophy of Science at the University of Melbourne. The main purpose and objective of the centre was to help preserve all the historical works relating to Australian science, technology, and medicine. By utilising more advanced technology, all the information within the centre could be easily accessed by anyone.

Originally, Austehc was called the Australian Science Archives Project (ASAP), but was later changed after facing some challenges in May 1999. Their two most popular projects were Bright Sparc, which was developed in 1994, and Australian Science at Work, developed in 1999. Later on, these two projects merged with each other and became known as Encyclopedia of Australian Science during the time of Austehc's successor, the eScholarship Research Centre.

== History ==
The predecessor of Austehc, Australian Science Archives Project, was first established in 1985. Their goal was not to conduct in-depth research and publish the result, but to provide researchers information for their own research. From 1985 to 1992, approximately 36% of ASAP published works were archival guides, 21% were conference papers, client reports and newsletters each took up 19% of the total publications, and 5% were journal articles. During this time period, the ASAP started using PC-based relational database systems in the archival science sector.

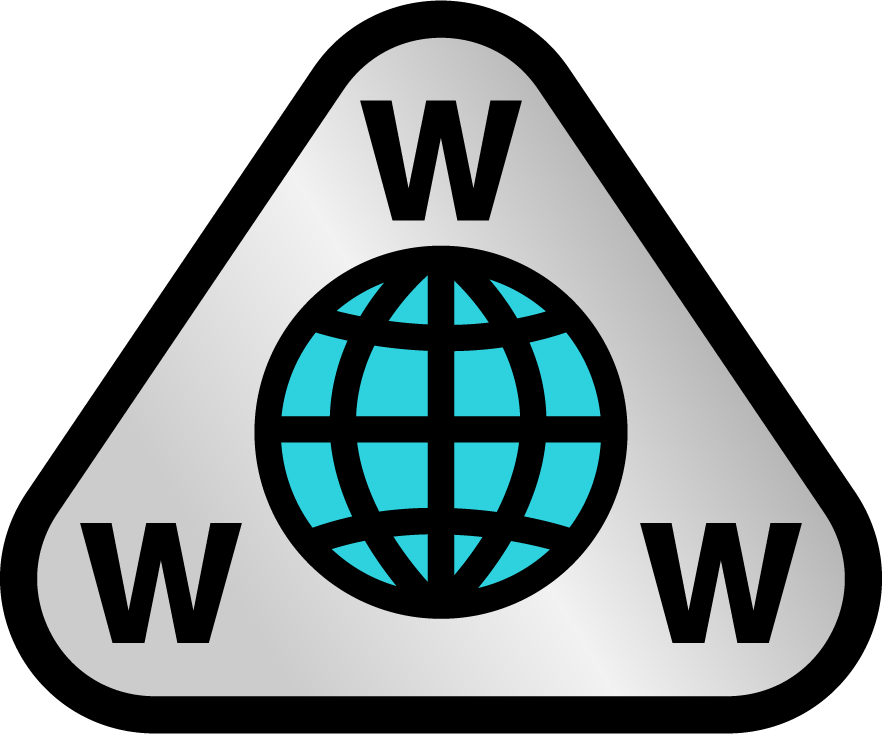
Logo of World Wide Web

With the introduction of the World Wide Web in 1993–1994, several adjustments were made in the ASAP. From 1992 to 1999, 11% of its publications were considered web resources, which was not a common term during this time. The archival guides now only take up 22% of the total publications and the majority of them were also transferred to digital platforms. Due to the ASAP making substantial contributions to the State Electricity Commission of Victoria when the Victorian State Government decided to privatize power generators, the client report during this time period increased up to 37% of the published works. 16% of the publications were conference papers, 8% were journal articles, Newsletter took up to 4%, books and others contributed to roughly 2% of the publications. Although the Australian Science Archives Project was able to develop their digital tools and adapt to the impact of the World Wide Web, they also had to face several challenges. It was also during this time that one of their major projects, Bright Sparc, was created.

Due to being unable to gain financial independence, many of ASAP's ongoing projects were merged with other works of the Melbourne Office. Although major transformations were inevitable, they still kept their original goal to retain historical data and research of Australian science. Hence, the ASAP was officially renamed to the Australian Science and Technology Heritage Centre in May 1999. Austehc was directed by Gavan McCarthy and as the successor of ASAP, they continued the majority of their works with the addition of new disciplines of social and cultural informatics, along with new projects, most significantly the Australian Science at Work. Austehc also began teaching the second and third year students in an art subject called 'Fact, Fiction, and Fraud in the Digital Age' for Melbourne University. However, despite their teachings, not many students joined Austehc making it very difficult to establish Austehc as a research centre.

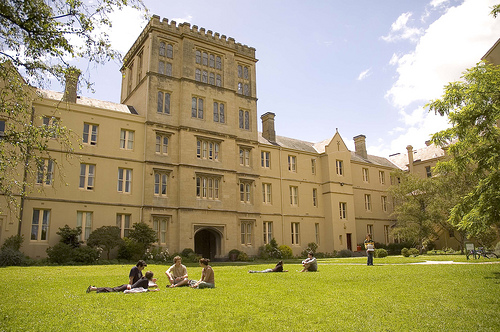
The University of Melbourne

During the time Austehc lasted, more than half of their publications (52%) were archival guides. The reason for this was because they wanted to standardise the website for the previous archival guides so that it would "not become relics of early socio technical constraint". 13% of their published work were journal articles, which was deemed as low considering the fact that they were aspiring to become an official research centre. 22% were conference papers. Web resources and client reports each took 7% and 5% of the total respectively.

In 2005, the restructuring of the Faculty of Art in the University of Melbourne caused many difficulties for the Australian Science and Technology Heritage Centre. In 2006, Linda O'Brien, the Chief Information Officer and University Librarian of University of Melbourne, offered to transfer Austehc to the University Library with an increase in budget allocation but under a new name: eScholarship Research Centre.

== Projects ==
=== Bright Sparc ===
Bright Sparc was an online register where users could find the work and bibliographic resources of people who contributed to the development of Australian's science, technology, engineering, and medicine. When it was first established, it could only register names and archival records of influential people. However, as time went by, they were able to add more and more information about each scientists such as a summary of their life and work, career timeline, etc.

This project began developing in 1993 due to the rapid development of technologies. The Australian Science Archives Project started transferring existing data and added new features to this new platform. However, it was also during this time period that the World Wide Web gained its popularity, which led the Bright Sparc to be officially launched as a web resource in 1994. This project lasted until February 2010, when the eScholarship Research Centre decided to merge Bright Sparc with Australian Science at Work to create the Encyclopedia of Australian Science.

=== Australian Science at Work ===
The Australian Science at Work project was first published in 1999 by the Australian Science and Technology Heritage Centre. This was an online register of research institutions, corporations, industries, scientific societies, and other organisations that were actively involved in the history of science in Australia, funded by the Australian Research Council. Originally, Austehc planned to add this information into the Bright Sparc register. However, this procedure was too complex to append additional data into Bright Sparc with the technology of the time. After these two projects coexisted independently for 10 years, they eventually amalgamated in February 2010, establishing the Encyclopedia of Australian Science under the jurisdiction of the eScholarship Research Centre.

== Goals and achievements ==
As the name suggests, the Australian Science and Technology Heritage Centre stressed the importance of maintaining valuable sets of records and artefacts regarding Australia's science, technology, and medicine. When Austehc was first established, Gavan McCarthy, director of Austehc, expressed his keenness on creating a place to keep all the important historical researches that would benefit the future generations. He believed that not only does the heritage of science and technology was essential to help others understand more about their daily lives, but it was extremely critical for further scientific development. With new digital documentation technologies arising at the time, it created opportunities for Austehc to preserve and share scientific knowledge. To accomplish their mission, Austehc became a Web publisher to help develop the international archive and heritage community as well as a research centre to investigate and verify historical informatics.

Austehc Web was able to provide a wide variety of resources that could be easily accessed by people of different levels, ranging from primary school materials to PhD documentations. During the time Austehc was active, they contributed greatly to the University of Melbourne and their students. They started teaching an undergraduate course, Fact, Fiction and Fraud in the Digital Age, and supervised several post-graduate projects relating the history of Australian Science and Technology by using and providing documentation. Their project, Bright Sparc, performed well with over 4,000 registries of individuals who contributed to Australian science, including women, who were neglected throughout the history. They dedicated an entire online exhibition called Where are the Women in Australian Science to remedy the fact that "women seem to disappear from the historical record". Austehc also managed to compile almost 5,000 citations into a comprehensive bibliography to allow users to develop better understanding towards most of the documentations stored in the Web. Additionally, the Australian Science and Technology Heritage Centre undertook several collaborative projects with other institutions and companies such as the Australian Academy of Technological Sciences and Engineering, the Royal Societies of Victoria, the Commonwealth Bureau of Meteorology, and Industry Victoria. This assisted Austehc to provide more refined information to the public and add additional data to the collections.

== Future ==
After the closure of the Australian Science and Technology Heritage Centre in 2006, it became integrated with the University of Melbourne's Library and changed its name to the eScholarship Research Centre (ESRC), with a much better financial allocation offer. Shortly after the establishment of ESRC, the 2008 financial crisis resulted in the promised budget being reduced by a large amount and they faced another financial crisis similar to its predecessor. However, building upon the achievements and progression of the Austehc and ASAP, they managed to develop several external projects that acted as their funding source, which allowed them to barely survive past this crisis. Hence, they were not able to achieve the goal that Linda O’Brian envisioned when offering to merge Austehc with the University Library. From 2007 to 2013, due to the increase in external projects for budget, the client reports increased up to 17% of the total publications of ESRC. During this time period, archival guides took up to 26%, conference papers at 19%, 16% were web resources, 14% were journal articles, 6% were books and book chapters, and about 1% were other types of documents.

It was also during this time that Bright Sparc and Australian Science at Work came together as one entity under a new name, the Encyclopedia of Australian Science. As mentioned above, they had originally wanted to make Bright Sparc and Australian Science at Work one project but due to the technological difficulty for that time, they were unable to achieve this. In February 2010, the ESRC managed to complete this task, creating a new project. The Encyclopedia of Australian Science is an online registry with the function of both Bright Sparc and Australian Science at Work, which includes information about people, organisations, and research institutions that have contributed to Australia's heritage of science, technology, and medicine. Within the registry, the following data on people and organisations are presented:

- Name and alternative names
- Date and place of birth/death (if known)
- Occupations or field of specialisation
- Summary of their life and work
- Timeline of career
- Related organisations

From 2014 onwards, the eScholarship Research Centre remained roughly the same but now became part of the Research and Collections in Academic Services. With the monetary crisis subsided, there was an increase in journal articles and other scholarly outputs in their publications. 32% were archival guides, 28% were conference papers, 21% were journal articles, web resources took up 9%, client reports and books were 4% each, and others were 2% of the total publications.

After 35 years of dedication to preserve Australia's science and technology heritage, the ESRC was officially closed on June 30, 2020. Several ESRC projects will be transferred in the near future and although materials will no longer be updated to the ESRC, they will still be preserved and be available online for access.
