= Australian Journal of Chemistry =

- Discipline: Chemistry
- Language: English
- Edited by: George Koutsantonis, John Wade

Publication details
- History: 1948–present
- Publisher: CSIRO Publishing (Australia)
- Frequency: Monthly
- Impact factor: 1.32 (2020)

Standard abbreviations
- ISO 4: Aust. J. Chem.

Indexing
- CODEN: AJCHAS
- ISSN: 0004-9425 (print); 1445-0038 (web)
- OCLC no.: 960772449

Links
- Journal homepage

The Australian Journal of Chemistry - an International Journal for Chemical Science is a monthly peer-reviewed scientific journal published by CSIRO Publishing. It was established in 1948 and covers all aspects of chemistry. The editors-in-chief are George Koutsantonis (University of Western Australia) and John Wade (University of Melbourne).

== Abstracting and indexing ==
The journal is abstracted and indexed in:

- CAB Abstracts
- Chemical Abstracts Service
- Current Contents/Physical, Chemical & Earth Sciences
- EBSCO databases
- Ei Compendex
- Science Citation Index
- Scopus

According to the Journal Citation Reports, the journal has a 2020 impact factor of 1.32.

== See also ==
- Environmental Chemistry (journal)
- List of scientific journals in chemistry
