= Meta Ditzel =

Danish politician (1910–1999)

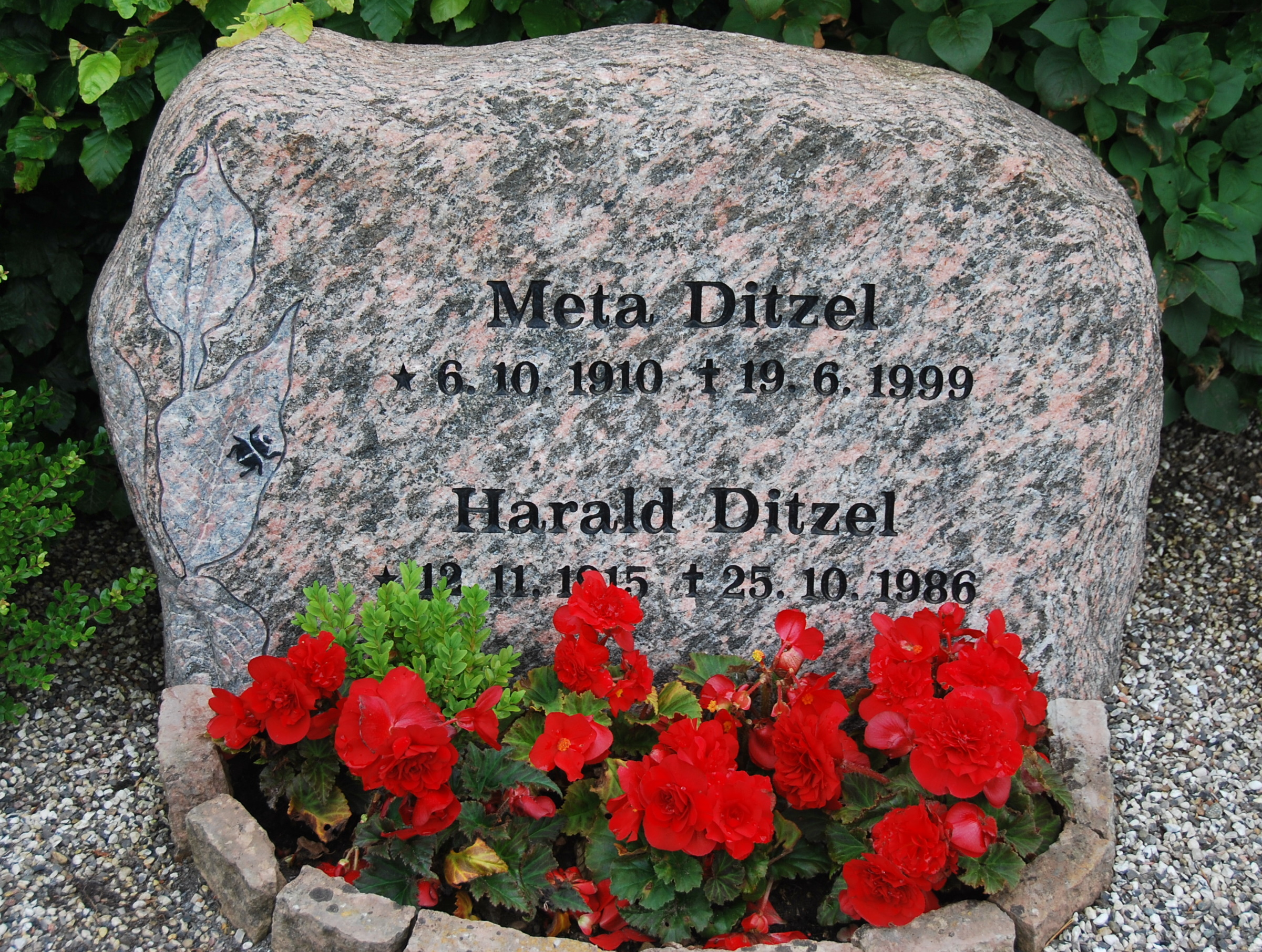
Ditzel's and her husband's gravestone in Viborg churchyard

Meta Katrine Nedergaard Ditzel (6 October 1910 – 19 June 1999) was a Danish politician who focussed on the issue of peace.

Meta Nedergaard was born on 6 October 1910 in Tarm, West Jutland. She graduated in philosophy from Aarhus University and also studied French and German in Paris and Vienna. She became a school teacher and by 1950 was a school head teacher.

From 1968 to 1975, she was a member of the Folketing (Danish parliament) for the Radical Left Party, Det Radikale Venstre, representing Aarhus constituency.

In 1942 she published a novel, Thi Adam dannedes først (Because Adam was formed first) which concerned the tensions between women's roles in work and marriage.

She married museum inspector Harald Ditzel (1915–1986) in 1941 and they had two daughters.

Meta Ditzel died in Viborg on 19 June 1999.

== Selected publications ==
- Ditzel, Meta (1942). Thi Adam dannedes først [Because Adam was formed first].
- Ditzel, Meta (1983). Den offentlige mening og fredsbevægelsen [Public opinion and the peace movement]. Viborg: Meta. ISBN 9788798152309.
