= Joseph D. Tucker =

American physician researcher

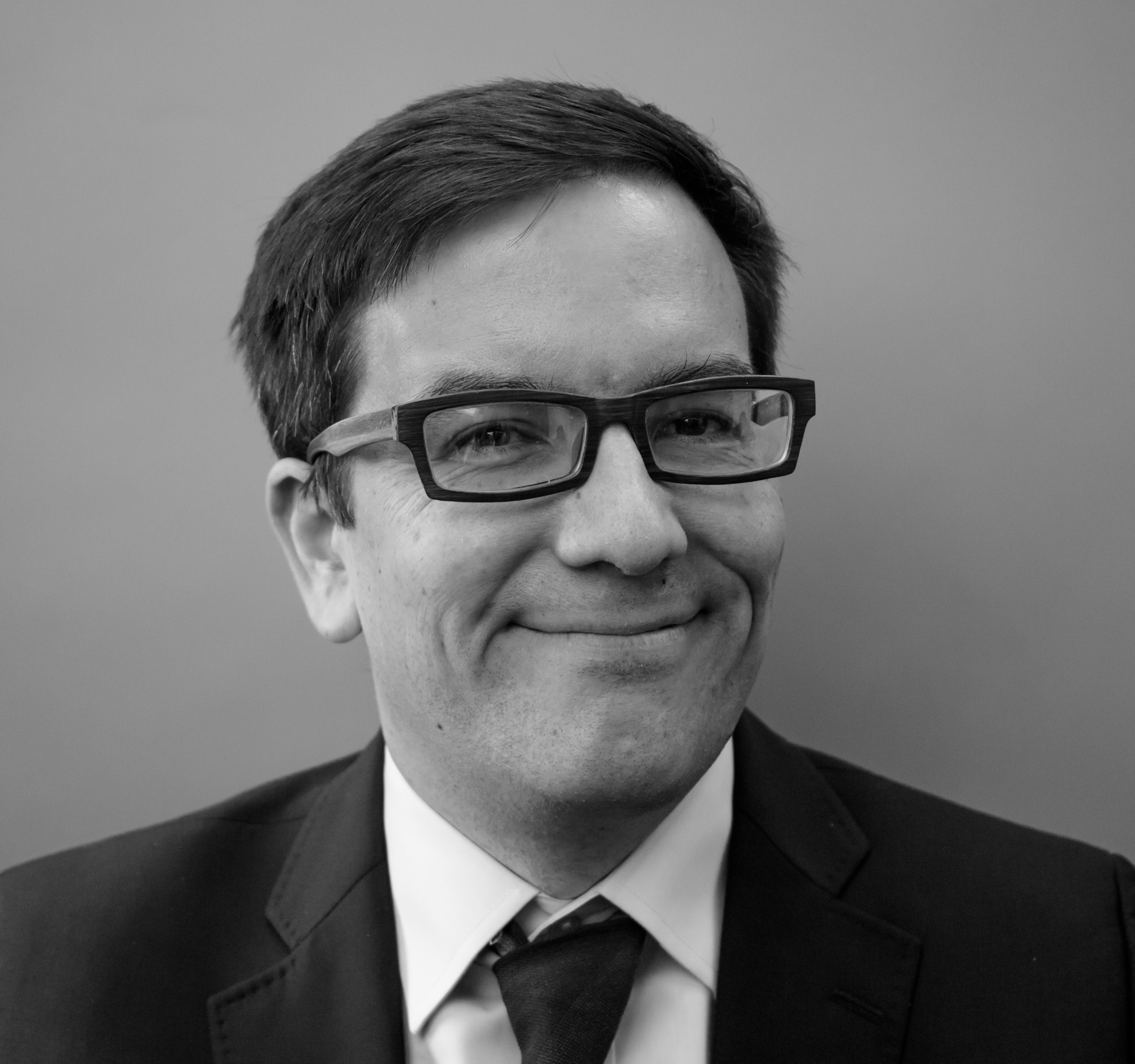
Joseph Tucker in 2019 (from Washington DC ASTMH Conference), CC-BY Joseph D Tucker Born 12 April 1978 Chicago, U.S. Occupation physician, researcher, social innovator Alma mater NCSSM (Class of 1996), Swarthmore College (Class of 2000), UNC-Chapel Hill (Class of 2004), Harvard University (Class of 2010), LSHTM (Class of 2014) Genre infectious diseases, public health, social innovation Years active (2007–present)

Joseph D. Tucker (born 1978) is an American physician researcher who has made contributions to crowdsourcing and open innovation related to medicine and public health. He is the founder of SESH, a partnership that leverages crowd wisdom to develop public health interventions and community engagement practices. Tucker is a tenured Professor at the University of North Carolina at Chapel Hill where he also is Director of the UNC Project-China. He is a Professor of Global Health at the London School of Hygiene and Tropical Medicine. He is the Co-Editor-in-Chief of the journal Sexual Health.

== Education ==
Tucker graduated from the North Carolina School of Science and Mathematics in Durham, North Carolina and then earned a bachelors of arts degree from Swarthmore College. He received his M.D. degree from the University of North Carolina at Chapel Hill (2004) and did internal medicine training at the University of California San Francisco. He completed an infectious diseases fellowship at Massachusetts General Hospital. He earned an A.M. in Regional Studies East Asia at Harvard University (2010). Tucker earned a PhD in public health (2014) at the London School of Hygiene and Tropical Medicine supervised by Professors Rosanna Peeling and Heidi Larson. Tucker was an instructor at Harvard Medical School until joining UNC Chapel Hill as Assistant Professor in 2012.

== Research ==
Tucker’s research contributed to the characterization of the burden of syphilis in China. His research helped to demonstrate that syphilis was common among many groups, including pregnant women. This research study has been widely cited and resulted in several subsequent investigations of syphilis in China. A University of College London research team noted that his New England Journal of Medicine article directly informed China's national syphilis screening program.

Tucker's research group examines how crowdsourcing approaches such as open contests and hackathons can be used for medical and public health purposes. Tucker has led several randomized controlled trials showing that crowdsourcing can enhance HIV test uptake. As part of this research, he adapted the hackathon methodology to design health interventions, called a designathon. This line of research has led to similar projects in Nigeria, the United States, Vietnam, and other countries. In addition, Tucker has used crowdsourcing methods to develop pay-it-forward approaches for health. Pay-it-forward has an individual receive a free gift and then decided whether they would like to support other people to receive the same gift. The research team led by Tucker showed that pay-it-forward could be used to increase gonorrhea and chlamydia testing among sexual minorities.

During the COVID-19 pandemic, Tucker helped to organize a crowdsourcing open call to inform the fall semester at UNC Chapel Hill called the Carolina Collective. This project brought together students, faculty and staff to identify community-based solutions related to COVID-19.

== Awards ==
Tucker's crowdsourcing research was identified by TDR in 2017 as one of the top global innovations. The pay-it-forward research was recognized at the 2018 World Health Summit, the 2019 UNAIDS Health Innovation Exchange, and the 2020 World Health Organization Re-Boot Challenge. He received a mid-career Award from the National Institutes of Health based on his global experience with HIV research mentorship.

== Publications ==
He has published over 500 research manuscripts and has an h-index of 57 and an i10-index of 290.

== Service ==
Tucker is a member of the Board of Directors of the International Society for Sexually Transmitted Diseases. He was invited to give oral presentations at World Health Organization meetings in Kampala, Uganda (WHO/TDR, October 2019), Nairobi, Kenya (WHO/HRP, January 2020), Geneva, Switzerland (TDR, 2019), Jakarta, Indonesia (WHO SEARO, 2016), New Delhi, India (WHO SEARO, 2015), and Tokyo, Japan (WHO WPR, 2015). He has contributed to six World Health Organization guidelines or guidance documents, including leading the development of a TDR/SIHI/SESH Practical Guide on Crowdsourcing in Health and Health Research. He currently serves on the TDR Global Working Group.

== Most Cited Articles ==
- Deeks, Steven G; Lewin, Sharon R; Ross, Anna Laura; Ananworanich, Jintanat; Benkirane, Monsef; Cannon, Paula; Chomont, Nicolas; Douek, Daniel; Lifson, Jeffrey D; Lo, Ying-Ru; Kuritzkes, Daniel; Margolis, David; Mellors, John; Persaud, Deborah; Tucker, Joseph D; Barre-Sinoussi, Françoise; Alter, Galit; Auerbach, Judith; Autran, Brigitte; Barouch, Dan H; Behrens, Georg; Cavazzana, Marina; Chen, Zhiwei; Cohen, Éric A; Corbelli, Giulio Maria; Eholié, Serge; Eyal, Nir; Fidler, Sarah; Garcia, Laurindo; Grossman, Cynthia; Henderson, Gail; Henrich, Timothy J; Jefferys, Richard; Kiem, Hans-Peter; McCune, Joseph; Moodley, Keymanthri; Newman, Peter A; Nijhuis, Monique; Nsubuga, Moses Supercharger; Ott, Melanie; Palmer, Sarah; Richman, Douglas; Saez-Cirion, Asier; Sharp, Matthew; Siliciano, Janet; Silvestri, Guido; Singh, Jerome; Spire, Bruno; Taylor, Jeffrey; Tolstrup, Martin; Valente, Susana; van Lunzen, Jan; Walensky, Rochelle; Wilson, Ira; Zack, Jerome; Zack, J (August 2016). "International AIDS Society global scientific strategy: towards an HIV cure 2016". Nature Medicine. 22 (8): 839–850. doi:10.1038/nm.4108. PMC 5322797. PMID 27400264.
- Tucker, Joseph D; Henderson, Gail E; Wang, Tian F; Huang, Ying Y; Parish, William; Pan, Sui M; Chen, Xiang S; Cohen, Myron S (8 April 2005). "Surplus men, sex work, and the spread of HIV in China". AIDS. 19 (6): 539–547. doi:10.1097/01.aids.0000163929.84154.87. PMID 15802971. S2CID 32792732.
- Tucker, Joseph D.; Chen, Xiang-Sheng; Peeling, Rosanna W. (6 May 2010). "Syphilis and Social Upheaval in China" (PDF). New England Journal of Medicine. 362 (18): 1658–1661. doi:10.1056/nejmp0911149. PMID 20445179.
- Tucker, Joseph D; Bu, Jin; Brown, Lillian B; Yin, Yue-Pin; Chen, Xiang-Sheng; Cohen, Myron S (June 2010). "Accelerating worldwide syphilis screening through rapid testing: a systematic review". The Lancet Infectious Diseases. 10 (6): 381–386. doi:10.1016/S1473-3099(10)70092-X. PMID 20510278.
