= SESH =

Medical partnership

SESH (Social Entrepreneurship to Spur Health; Chinese: 赛思项目) is a partnership between Southern Medical University Dermatology Hospital and the University of North Carolina Project-China that uses crowdsourcing to improve health. In China, the team lead the "Sex + Health" image crowdsourcing contest, a condom contest, crowdsourcing for patterns for HIV testing and referrals, and the "HepTestContest," a global hepatitis testing contest. Together with the World Health Organization, SESH helped develop the HepTestContest. The purpose was to identify and evaluate Hepatitis B/C testing projects throughout the world. They also organized the "Healthy Cities Contest" and helped to advise on "2BeatHIV." The founder of the organization is Joe Tucker.

== Research ==
=== Crowdsourcing & Social Entrepreneurship ===
- Crowdsourcing HIV Test Promotion Videos: A Non-Inferiority Randomized Controlled Trial in China.《众包HIV检测视频：一项中国的非劣效性随机分配对照试验》
- Crowdsourcing health communication about condom use in men who have sex with men in China: a randomised controlled trial.《众包关于中国男男性行为中保险套使用的健康交流：*一项随机对照实验》
- Organizational characteristics of HIV/syphilis testing services for men who have sex with men in South China: a social entrepreneurship analysis and implications for creating sustainable service models.《为中国南方男男性行为者提供的HIV/梅毒检测服务中的组织特性：对监理可持续服务模式的社会企业与影响分析》
- Creative Contributory Contests to Spur Innovation in Sexual Health: 2 Cases and a Guide for Implementation.《用创意征集比赛来促进性健康创新：2个个案及执行指引》
- Innovation contests to promote sexual health in china: a qualitative evaluation.《为中国推广性健康的创新型比赛：一个定性评估》
- Acceptability and feasibility of a social entrepreneurship testing model to promote HIV self-testing and linkage to care among men who have sex with men.《社会企业模型对促进MSM群体HIV自我检测及级联关怀的可接受性及可行性评估》

=== Men Who Have Sex With Men (MSM) ===
- A Mixed-Methods Study on the Acceptability of Using eHealth for HIV Prevention and Sexual Health Care Among Men Who Have Sex With Men in China.《对中国男男性行为者HIV预防和性健康护理的电子健康使用接受性的混合方法研究》
- Gay Apps for Seeking Sex Partners in China: Implications for MSM Sexual Health《中国的同志寻性手机应用：对MSM性健康的影响》
- Intimate Partner Violence and Correlates with Risk Behaviors and HIV/STI Diagnoses Among Men Who Have Sex With Men and Men Who Have Sex with Men and Women in China: A Hidden Epidemic.《对中国男男性行为者和双性性行为这亲密伴侣暴力与高危行为和HIV/STI诊断的相关分析：隐藏的瘟疫》

=== HIV Detection ===
- HIV self-testing among key populations: an implementation science approach to evaluating self-testing.《关键人群中的HIV自我检测：评估自我检测的科学执行方法》
- HIV and syphilis testing preferences among men who have sex with men in South China: a qualitative analysis to inform sexual health services.《中国南方男男性行为者的HIV和梅毒检测偏好：对性健康服务的定性分析》
- Strategies for promoting HIV testing uptake: willingness to receive couple-based and collective HIV testing among a cross-sectional online sample of men who have sex with men in China.《推广HIV检测策略：中国男男性行为者在线横截面样本中的接受以伴侣为基和集体HIV检测意愿》
- HIV self-testing among online MSM in China: implications for expanding HIV testing among key populations.《中国网络MSM人群的HIV自我检测：在关键人群中扩展HIV检测的影响》
- Sexual Behaviors and HIV/Syphilis Testing Among Transgender Individuals in China: Implications for Expanding HIV Testing Services.《中国变性人的性行为与HIV/梅毒检测：扩展HIV检测服务的影响》
