= Pacific Conservation Biology =

Peer-reviewed scientific journal

- Discipline: Environmental science
- Language: English
- Edited by: Mike Calver

Publication details
- Publisher: CSIRO Publishing (Australia)
- Frequency: Quarterly

Standard abbreviations
- ISO 4: Pac. Conserv. Biol.

Indexing
- ISSN: 1038-2097 (print); 2204-4604 (web)

Links
- Journal homepage; Online access; All issues

Pacific Conservation Biology is a peer-reviewed scientific journal published by CSIRO Publishing and dedicated to conservation and wildlife management in the Pacific region. It publishes original research, reviews, perspectives and book reviews.

Pacific Conservation Biology was established in June 1993 by Surrey Beatty & Sons, a private independent publisher. The Society for Conservation Biology Board of Governors approved a Memorandum of Understanding promoting collaboration due to the similar interest of their organisation and Surrey Beatty. The journal was taken over by CSIRO Publishing in 2015.

The current editor-in-chief is Mike Calver (Murdoch University).

== Abstracting and indexing ==
The journal is abstracted and indexed in BIOSIS Previews, CAB Abstracts, Embiology, GEOBASE, Scopus and Zoological Record.
