= Australian Journal of Primary Health =

- Discipline: Community health services, primary health care
- Language: English
- Edited by: Amanda Kenny, Virginia Lewis

Publication details
- Former name(s): Australian Journal of Primary Health Interchange
- History: 1995–present
- Publisher: CSIRO Publishing on behalf of the Australian Institute for Primary Care & Ageing (La Trobe University) (Australia)
- Frequency: Quarterly
- Impact factor: 1.152 (2015)

Standard abbreviations
- ISO 4: Aust. J. Prim. Health

Indexing
- ISSN: 1448-7527 (print); 1836-7399 (web)
- OCLC no.: 60616263
- Australian Journal of Primary Health Interchange
- ISSN: 1324-2296

Links
- Journal homepage; Online access; Online archive

The Australian Journal of Primary Health is a quarterly peer-reviewed healthcare journal published by CSIRO Publishing on behalf of the Australian Institute for Primary Care and Ageing (La Trobe University). It was established in 1995 as the Australian Journal of Primary Health Interchange and obtained its current name in 2001. The journal covers all aspects of community health services and primary health care.

The current Editors-in-Chief are Amanda Kenny and Virginia Lewis.

== Abstracting and indexing ==
The journal is abstracted and indexed in Applied Social Sciences Index and Abstracts, Australasian Medical Index, Australian Public Affairs Information Service, CINAHL, Embase, Google Scholar, Journal Citation Reports (Sciences Edition), Journal Citation Reports (Social Sciences Edition), MEDLINE, Science Citation Index Expanded, Scopus, Social Sciences Citation Index, Social SciSearch, Social Services Abstracts and Sociological Abstracts.

== Impact factor ==
According to the Journal Citation Reports, the journal has a 2015 impact factor of 1.152.
