= AGORA =

Scheme for low-cost access to publications

AGORA (Access to Global Online Research in Agriculture)
- Formation: 2003
- Website: https://agora.research4life.org/

AGORA is one of the five programs within Research4Life, a public-private partnership providing free or low-cost access to scientific and professional knowledge to institutions in lower income countries. AGORA is dedicated to agricultural information.

It was launched in 2003 by the Food and Agriculture Organization of the United Nations (FAO) in partnership with Cornell University and publisher partners.

Coordinated by the FAO on behalf of its multiple public and private partners, the goal is to support the effective use of agricultural research, education and training by academics, students, practitioners and government personnel with access to high-quality, relevant and timely agricultural information on the internet.

AGORA is part of Research4Life, the collective name for five programs – HINARI (focusing on health), AGORA (focusing on agriculture), OARE (focusing on environment), and ARDI (focusing on applied science and technology).

== History ==
The AGORA program was launched in October 2003 by FAO, Cornell University and nine founding publishers: Blackwell Publishing, CABI Publishing, Elsevier, Kluwer Academic Publishers, Lippincott, Williams & Wilkins, Nature Publishing Group, Oxford University Press, Springer-Verlag, and John Wiley & Sons.

Approximately 200 publishers now contribute content to AGORA and the other Research4Life programs.

The original development occurred in two phases: Phase I, in 2003, allowed access to 69 countries. Phase II increased this by allowing around 30 additional countries access at low cost.

AGORA is the acronym for the Access to Global Online Research on Agriculture program.

== Content and subjects ==
=== Subject Scope ===
AGORA's scope is wide-ranging, including but not limited to agriculture, animal science, applied microbiology, aquatic science, biochemistry, biology, biophysics, biotechnology, chemistry, economics, entomology, environment, fisheries, food science, forestry, natural resources, nutrition, plant science, social science, soil science.

=== Publications and Platforms ===
Publications are in several languages and are a mixture of journals, books, e-books, media reports and technical reports.

When launched, AGORA provided access to 400 journals. By March 2010, it contained over 1,278 journals. As of 2016, AGORA contains 6,000 journals and 22,000 books. As of May 2026, AGORA contains approximately 15,500 key journals and 48,000 books.

Users can browse through the journals and make searches using AGORA's Summon and other search engines.

== Eligibility for Access - Institutions and Countries ==
Approximately 3,400 institutions from 115 countries are registered with AGORA.

Whether an institution is eligible for access to AGORA and the other Research4Life programs is based on the type of institution and the country in which it is located. International organizations are not eligible, nor are individuals.

=== Institutions ===
Eligible institutions whose staff and students may access the journals are national universities, and colleges, (medicine, agriculture, pharmacy, public health, engineering, etc.), teaching hospitals and healthcare centers, local non-governmental organizations, research institutes, agricultural extension centres, government offices and libraries.

=== Countries ===
Whether a country is eligible is based on five factors, including GNI figures from the World Bank and the Healthy Life Expectancy figures from the WHO. If a country is eligible for Research4Life, the country will be placed in either Group A or Group B based on those figures. Countries in Group A will receive free access, and countries in Group B will receive low-cost access.

== Restrictions ==
Due to publishers' market interests and business plans, not all developing countries are eligible, as in some of these countries, the publishers have significant levels of existing subscriptions. Some of these countries include South Africa, India and China.

Critics find problems with the use of GNI as a criterion, however. China, for example, is a large developing country facing an information divide, which is not reflected by the GNI. In large cities and coastal areas of China, per capita GNI can be four times that of the poor localities, yet poor 'local' researchers cannot get low-price access because China as a whole surpasses the baseline criterion.

== Related initiatives ==
- HINARI (Access to Research Initiative) launched in 2002 and is administered by World Health Organization (WHO).
- OARE (Online Access to Research in the Environment) launched in October 2006 and is coordinated by the United Nations Environment Programme (UNEP).
- ARDI (Access to Research for Development and Innovation) launched in 2010 and administered by the World Intellectual Property Organization (WIPO)
- TEEAL (The Essential Electronic Agricultural Library) Project is administered through Mann Library's Collection and Services Department.
- ITOCA (Information Training and Outreach Centre for Africa), in Pretoria, South Africa, handles awareness and training missions across the African continent.
