= Food Science and Technology Abstracts =

Scientific publication database

FSTA – Food Science and Technology Abstracts
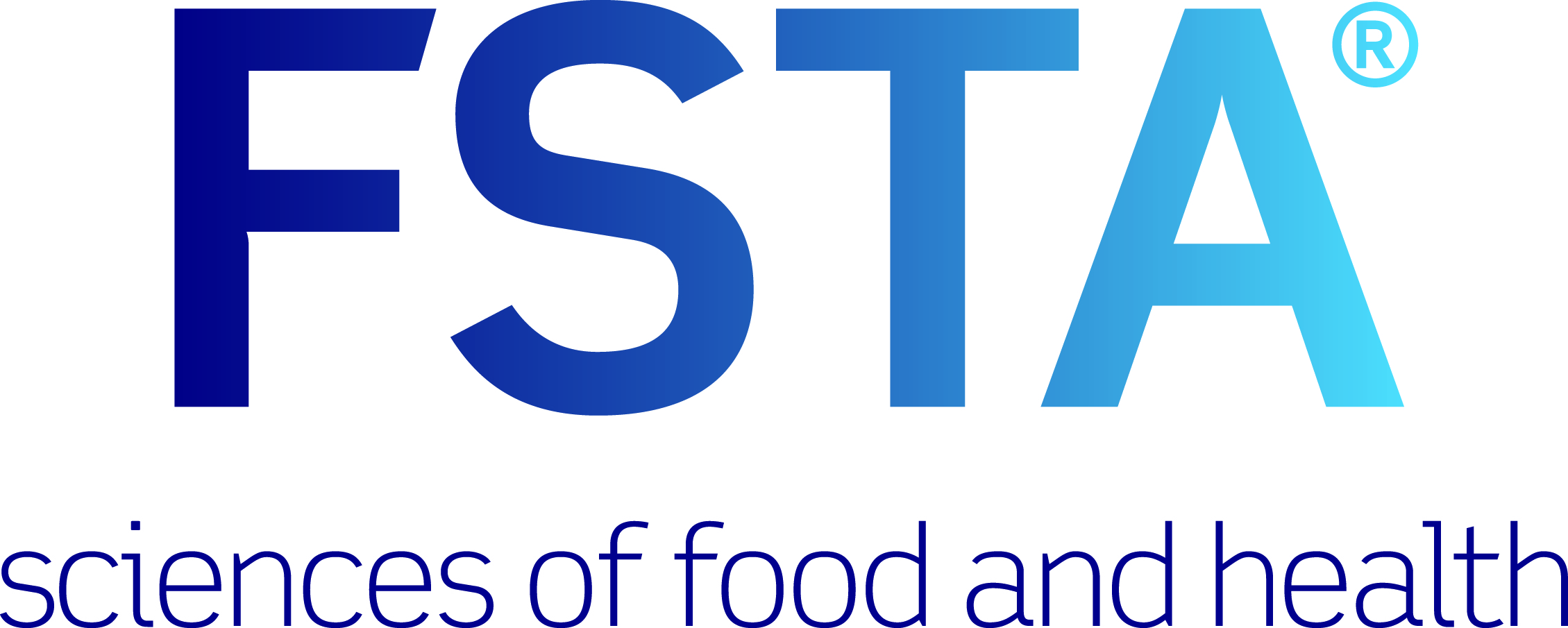
- Producer: IFIS Publishing
- Languages: 29 Languages

Coverage
- Disciplines: Sciences of Food and Health
- Temporal coverage: 1969-present

FSTA, also known as FSTA – Food Science and Technology Abstracts, is produced by IFIS Publishing.

FSTA is a bibliographic abstracting and indexing (A&I) database of scientific and technological research and information relating to food, beverages, and nutrition. It contains over 1,400,000 indexed records, with full-text links where available.

The database is used by researchers, industry practitioners, and university students.

== Coverage ==
In addition to over 5,475 active and historical journals, FSTA indexes books, trade publications, reviews, conference proceedings, reports, patents, and standards, producing 22,675 sources overall. Updated weekly, its records are indexed against IFIS' thesaurus, which contains over 12,346 food science keywords, curated and structured into food-centric hierarchies.

With records dating back to 1969, FSTA contains information sources in 29 languages, sourced from publishers in over 60 countries.

Coverage includes all major commodities in the food and beverage industry, related applied and pure sciences, pet foods, food psychology, food economics, food safety, and more.

== Online access ==
FSTA can be accessed through EBSCOhost, Ovid, Proquest Dialog, STN and Web of Science.

== See also ==
- Google Scholar
- List of academic databases and search engines
- Lists of academic journals
- List of open-access journals
- List of scientific journals
