= HINARI =

Hinari
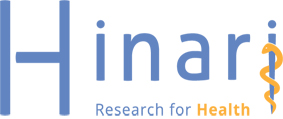
- Formation: 2001
- Founders: Blackwell, Elsevier, the Harcourt Worldwide STM Group, Wolters Kluwer, Springer Verlag and John Wiley
- Type: Non-profit
- Purpose: To provide free or low-cost online access to academic and professional knowledge
- Headquarters: Geneva, Switzerland
- Fields: Biomedicine; Health
- Parent organization: World Health Organization
- Website: https://www.research4life.org/about/programs/hinari/

Hinari is one of five programs within Research4Life, a public-private partnership which provides eligible institutions in lower income countries with free or low-cost access to academic and professional peer-reviewed content online.

Hinari is dedicated to biomedical and health knowledge. It was set up by the World Health Organization in collaboration with major publishers and was the first of the Research4Life programs.

The other four Research4Life programs are each dedicated to different subject areas: AGORA focuses on agriculture, OARE focuses on the environment, ARDI focuses on applied science and technology, and GOALI focuses on law and justice.

== History ==
In response to a call by the then UN Secretary General Kofi Annan and to a statement issued by Gro Harlem Brundtland the then Director General World Health Organization, Hinari was launched in July 2001 with a statement of intent from six major publishers: Blackwell Publishing, Elsevier, the Harcourt, Wolters Kluwer, Springer Science+Business Media, and John Wiley & Sons.

The program opened for use in January 2002 with around 1,500 journals from the initial six publishers.

Hinari is an acronym of the program's original name, the Health Inter-Network Access to Research Initiative, and the use of the full name was later abandoned.

== Program ==
As of 2026, eligible non-profit institutions can access thousands of journals, books and databases from approximately 200 publisher partners through the Hinari program. Access is through a special version of the PubMed (Medline) platform and other subject indexes.

== Eligibility for access ==
=== Institutions ===
Institutions eligible to access the program are: national universities, professional schools (medicine, nursing, pharmacy, public health, dentistry), research institutes, teaching hospitals and healthcare centers, government offices, national medical libraries and local non-governmental organizations.

=== Countries ===
The eligible countries are based on five factors:

- Total GNI (World Bank figures)
- GNI per capita (World Bank figures)
- United Nations Least Developed Country (LDCs) List
- Human Development Index (HDI).
- Healthy Life Expectancy (HALE) (World Health Organization figures)

In 2007, users and members of eligible institutions in 113 countries had access. In 2026, the number of eligible countries, areas and territories stood at more than 120.

Some large, lower income countries including India and China are excluded by the program because their total GNI exceeds US$1 trillion.

== Response ==
In an article published in PLOS Medicine in 2007, authors argued that Hinari's low-cost model is still too high for many institutions and journals with top Impact Factors are not included in some countries.

Hinari received the high honor of the Medical Library Association's 2015 Louise Darling Medal for Collection Development in the Health Sciences.

== Related initiatives ==
- TEEAL (The Essential Electronic Agricultural Library)
- AGORA (Access to Global Online Research in Agriculture)
- OARE (Online Access to Research in the Environment)
- ARDI (Access to Research for Development and Innovation)
- GOALI (Global Online Access to Legal Information)
