= Australian Journal of Politics and History =

- Discipline: Politics, history
- Language: English

Publication details
- History: 1955–present
- Publisher: Wiley
- Frequency: Quarterly

Standard abbreviations
- ISO 4: Aust. J. Politics Hist.

Indexing
- ISSN: 0004-9522 (print); 1467-8497 (web)
- LCCN: a56006964
- OCLC no.: 754641373

Links
- Journal homepage; Online access; Online archive

The Australian Journal of Politics and History is a quarterly peer-reviewed academic journal that covers history, political studies, and international affairs, concentrating on Australia, New Zealand, and the Asia-Pacific region. It was established in 1955 by Gordon Greenwood, who served as editor-in-chief until 1982.

It was published triannually until 1997. In 1998 it began publishing quarterly. It is published by Wiley, and as of March 2025 it was recruiting for a new editor-in-chief.

== Abstracting and indexing ==
It is indexed or abstracted in:

- Academic Search
- Australian Public Affairs & Information Service
- Arts & Humanities Citation Index
- Current Contents
- InfoTrac
- International Political Science Abstracts
- ProQuest databases
- Scopus
- Web of Science
