= TEEAL =

Scientific research organization

The Essential Electronic Agricultural Library
- Purpose: Agricultural Education
- Location: Ithaca, NY
- Affiliations: Mann Library, Cornell University

TEEAL is The Essential Electronic Agricultural Library. Launched in 1999, it is a self-contained agricultural research library with full-text articles and graphics of over 200 major journals. TEEAL is a project of Cornell University's Albert R. Mann Library in cooperation with over 60 major scientific publishers, societies and index providers. Initial financial support has been provided by the Rockefeller Foundation, and currently by other foundations and donors.

== History ==
The idea for TEEAL arose in the 1980s, and was created by Wallace Olsen, former senior research associate, and Jan Olsen, former director, of Mann Library. During travels to developing countries, the Olsens saw underfunded and out-of-date journal collections. TEEAL was born in order to effect long-term improvements in food security and agricultural development by giving scientists better access to current research.

TEEAL was initially formed as a database of citations, linking to articles stored on hundreds of CD-ROMs. In 1999, the TEEAL Project sold its first “Library in a Box” — 130 journals with 600,000 pages of articles, stored on 100 compact discs — to the University of Zimbabwe.

Now that local area networks are more common in institutions and libraries in the developing world, LanTEEAL, the network-based variant of TEEAL, has been released to over 260 institutions.

Annual updates to journals in TEEAL are produced by Mann Library using revenue from sales of sets.

== TEEAL Content ==
With over 200 journals from over 60 publishers, TEEAL contains articles on many subjects related to the agricultural sciences, including: agricultural economics, agricultural engineering, agronomy, crop and soil science, entomology, natural resources management, forestry, livestock management, nutrition and food science, plant pathology, rural development, sustainable agriculture, and veterinary medicine.

== Outreach and Training ==
TEEAL sponsors much outreach and training. A two-person office was opened in Harare, Zimbabwe in 1999 to introduce African institutions to TEEAL, conduct training workshops and help interested institutions in writing grants to purchase TEEAL sets. Since 1999, the TEEAL Africa Office has helped place TEEAL sets in Africa and trained over 800 librarians, information specialists, and researchers. The office has created a network of contacts at libraries and information centers at major agricultural universities and national agricultural research institutes throughout sub-Saharan Africa.

In 2005, the TEEAL Africa Office also began to organize training workshops for HINARI, on behalf of the World Health Organization. To reflect this wider mandate, the TEEAL Africa Office has established itself as the Information, Training and Outreach Centre for Africa, responsible now more broadly for support in digital information resources for education and research. ITOCA now has a primary office in South Africa, with a branch office in Harare.

== 2004 User Study ==
IN 2004, the TEEAL User Study was conducted by Mann Library, with funding support from the Rockefeller Foundation. It demonstrated quantitatively and qualitatively the value of improving researchers' and students' access to scientific literature. Results of the TEEAL user study indicate that TEEAL is successfully meeting its objectives. The survey data confirm the high value students and researchers place on access to current scientific literature and the positive role of TEEAL in addressing their literature needs. Students, educators, and researchers consider TEEAL to be very useful in their work, enhancing both their productivity and the quality of their work.

The survey also yielded interesting insights into ongoing challenges that institutions face in making TEEAL widely available to users. 90 percent of users responded that they would use TEEAL more if they had better access. Data from the survey showed that use of TEEAL would increase dramatically if constraints, such as restricted hours of use, not enough computers and printers, and expensive printing charges, were addressed. Most TEEAL sets are housed in a library or information resource center.

The study further confirms that access to the Internet continues to be limited both on university campuses and at research institutes in Africa. Thus, until Internet technology is more widely available and affordable, web-based programs such as HINARI and AGORA need to be complemented with offline, easily accessible systems like TEEAL.

== Restrictions ==
TEEAL is available to public sector and not-for-profit educational and research institutions in 116 of the lowest income countries (as listed in the World Bank's 1998-99 World Development Report) to support agricultural development. The cost of TEEAL is kept relatively low, compared to the cost of individual subscriptions to its journals. If subscribed to individually, the cost of the journals in TEEAL would be worth over $1 million US dollars.

== Related initiatives ==
- HINARI (Health InterNetwork Access to Research Initiative), launched in January 2002 and set up by the World Health Organization (WHO).
- AGORA (Access to Global Online Research in Agriculture), launched in October 2003 and is administered by Food and Agriculture Organization of the United Nations (FAO).
- OARE (Online Access to Research in the Environment), launched in October 2006 and is coordinated by the United Nations Environment Programme (UNEP)
