= Elsevier Biobase =

Bibliographic database

- Producer: Elsevier
- History: 1954–present
- Languages: English

Access
- Providers: DataStar, DIALOG, DIMDI, STN
- Cost: Subscription

Coverage
- Disciplines: Biology
- Record depth: indexing, abstracting, bibliographic citations, and separate species dictionary
- Format coverage: titles, authors, abstracts, bibliographic details and authors' addresses
- Temporal coverage: 1994–present
- Geospatial coverage: Worldwide coverage
- No. of records: Over 4 million
- Update frequency: Weekly

Print edition
- ISSN: 0733-4443

Links
- Website: www.elsevier.com/wps/find/bibliographicdatabasedescription.cws_home/600715/description#description

Elsevier BIOBASE is a bibliographic database covering all topics pertaining to biological research throughout the world. It was established in the 1950s in print format as Current Awareness in Biological Sciences. Temporal coverage is from 1994 to the present. The database has over 4.1 million records as of December 2008. More than 300,000 records are added annually and 84% contain an abstract. It is updated weekly.

== Coverage ==
Coverage of the biological sciences is derived from 1,900 journals. Subjects are indexed by titles, authors, abstracts, bibliographic details and authors' addresses. This database covers the following disciplines:

- Applied microbiology & biotechnology
- Cancer research
- Cell & developmental biology
- Clinical chemistry
- Ecological & environmental sciences
- Endocrinology & metabolism
- Genetics & molecular biology
- Immunology & infectious diseases
- Neuroscience
- Plant science
- Protein biochemistry
- Toxicology

== Access points ==
Access points on the internet are DataStar, DIALOG, DIMDI, and STN.

== Former titles ==
This database continues:

International Abstracts of Biological Sciences (ISSN 0020-5818)

It also continues in part:

Current Advances in Neuroscience (ISSN 0741-1677)
Current Advances in Cell & Developmental Biology (ISSN 0741-1626)
