= Eugene Raymond Hall =

American mammalogist

Eugene Raymond Hall (11 May 1902, Imes, Kansas – 2 April 1986, Lawrence, Kansas) was an American mammalogist.

== Biology ==
Hall graduated from the University of Kansas with A.B. in 1924 and from the University of California, Berkeley with M.A. in 1925 and Ph.D. in 1928. His doctoral dissertation, under the direction of Joseph Grinnell, was a taxonomic revision of the American weasels. At U.C. Berkeley, Hall was a research assistant from 1926 to 1927, curator of the Museum of Vertebrate Zoology from 1927 to 1944, an assistant professor of vertebrate zoology from 1930 to 1937, and an associate professor from 1937 to 1944. At the University of Kansas he was a full professor and chair of the zoology department from 1944 to 1967, when he retired as professor emeritus. He was also the director of the University of Kansas Natural History Museum from 1944 to 1967. He persuaded Ralph Nicholson Ellis (1908–1945) to will his collection of books and papers to the University of Kansas. (In 1936 Ellis purchased most of the John Gould library.)

Hall was the author or co-author of more than 340 articles in numerous journals, including Journal of Mammalogy, The Auk, The Condor, The Wilson Bulletin, Proceedings of the Biological Society of Washington, Canadian Field-Naturalist, Outdoor Life, Annals and Magazine of Natural History, Mammalia, The American Naturalist, Zeitschrift für Säugetierkunde, Journal of Dental Research, Pacific Rural Press, and The Great Basin Naturalist. He was the author of six books.

E. Raymond Hall and Keith R. Kelson's two-volume work The Mammals of North America (1959) is regarded as a classic of North American mammalian systematics and biogeography. It was revised and reissued by Hall in 1981 under sole authorship.

Hall's 1951 book The American Weasels taxonomically restricted North American weasel species from about 30 allegedly different species to three valid species. In addition to numerous rodent subspecies, he described the vesper bat species Myotis elegans, the extinct skunk genus Martinogale, (with Gilmore) the Alaska marmot (Marmota broweri), (with Gilmore) the Saint Lawrence Island shrew (Sorex jacksoni), and (with Jones) the Cuban yellow bat (Lasiurus insularis). Hall's monograph Geographic Variation among Brown and Grizzly Bears (Ursus arctos) in North America (1984) fundamentally changed the taxonomy of North American brown bears, limiting the number of taxa to eight subspecies.

Hall was a member of the American Society of Mammalogists, where he served as president from 1944 to 1946. In 1964 he was elected an honorary member.

On 9 August 1924, Hall married Mary Frances Harkey (1900–1988). The couple had three sons, William Joel (1926-2020), Hubert Handel (1928–2010), and Benjamin Downs (1932–2019).

== Racism ==
Hall writes "What, then, are the chances of survival of the Caucasians in North America if they permit the infiltration of the Oriental subspecies of man from the larger land mass of Asia? The Caucasians' chances would appear poor indeed."

== Books ==
- Hall, E. Raymond; Kelson, Keith R. (1936). Studies of Tertiary and Quaternary mammals of North America.
- —— (1946). Mammals of Nevada.
- —— (1951). American weasels.
- —— (1955). Handbook of mammals of Kansas.
- —— (1959). The mammals of North America.
- —— (1962). Collecting and preparing study specimens of vertebrates.

== Sources ==
- J. Knox Jones, Jr.: Contributions in Mammalogy: A volume honoring Professor E. Raymond Hall, University of Kansas Museum of Natural History, Miscellaneous Publication, No. 51, 1969
- Elmer C. Birney, Jerry R. Choate: Seventy-five years of mammalogy, 1919–1994, Special Publication No. 11, The American Society of Mammalogists, 1994. (Portrait on page 41)
- Findley, James S.; Jones, J. Knox (1989). "Eugene Raymond Hall: 1902-1986". Journal of Mammalogy. 70 (2): 455–458. JSTOR 1381544.
