= List of mammalogists =

This is a list of notable mammalogists, in alphabetical order by surname.

== A-D ==
- Angel Cabrera Latorre (Spain/Argentina)
- Roy Chapman Andrews (USA)
- Vernon Bailey (USA)
- Isabel Behncke (Chile)
- Magdalena Bermejo (Republic of Congo/Spain)
- William Thomas Blanford (UK)
- Tim Clutton-Brock (UK)
- Juliane Diller (Koepcke) (Germany)
- Stephen D. Durrant (USA)

== E-H ==
- Tim Flannery (Australia)
- Dian Fossey (USA)
- Birutė Galdikas (Lithuania/Canada)
- Bryan P. Glass (USA)
- Edward Alphonso Goldman (USA)
- Jane Goodall (UK)
- John Edward Gray (UK)
- Donald Griffin (USA)
- Joseph Grinnell (USA)
- Bernhard Grzimek (Germany)
- David Harrison (UK)
- Philip Hershkovitz (USA)
- Hopi Hoekstra (USA)

== I-L ==
- Thomas C. Jerdon (UK)
- Karl Koopman (USA)
- Charles Krebs (Canada)
- John Alden Loring (USA)
- Marcus Ward Lyon Jr. (USA)
- Richard Lydekker (UK)

== M-P ==
- David W. Macdonald (UK)
- Martha Maxwell (USA)
- C. Hart Merriam (USA)
- Gerrit Smith Miller Jr. (USA)
- João Moojen (Brazil)
- Cynthia Moss (USA)
- James L. Patton (USA)
- Oliver Payne Pearson (USA)
- Wilhelm Peters (Germany)
- Reginald Innes Pocock (UK)

== Q-T ==
- Mazin Qumsiyeh (Palestine)
- George Schaller (Germany)
- David J. Schmidly (USA)
- Guy C. Shortridge (South Africa)
- George Gaylord Simpson (USA)
- Henri Jacob Victor Sody (Netherlands)
- Ian Stirling (Canada)
- Oldfield Thomas (UK)

== U-Z ==
- Richard G. Van Gelder (USA)
- Carlos Octaviano da Cunha Vieira (Brazil)
- Don E. Wilson (USA)
