= Barbara Hibbs Blake =

American mammalogist (1937–2019)

- Born: Barbara Jo Hibbs; August 6, 1937; Roseburg, Oregon, US
- Died: August 18, 2019; Lincoln, Massachusetts, US
- Occupation: Mammalogy
- Known for: Editor in chief, Journal of Mammalogy

Barbara Hibbs Blake (August 6, 1937 – August 18, 2019) was an American mammalogist and college professor.

== Early life ==
Barbara Jo Hibbs was born in Roseburg, Oregon, the daughter of Gordon Reid Hibbs and Marybelle Hauskins Hibbs (later Ramsby). Her mother was a nurse.

She graduated from Portland State University in 1959, and completed doctoral studies at Yale University in 1967. Her dissertation under entomologist Charles Lee Remington was titled "A comparative study of energy and water conservation throughout the annual cycle in ground dwelling Sciuridae."

== Career ==
Blake was a mammalogist. Her physiology research resulted in articles including "The annual cycle and fat storage in two populations of golden-mantled ground squirrels" (Journal of Mammalogy 1972), "The effects of kidney structure and the annual cycle on water requirements in golden-mantled ground squirrels and chipmunks" (Comparative Biochemistry and Physiology Part A: Physiology 1977), and "Reproduction of Asian chipmunks (Tamias sibiricus) in captivity" (Zoo Biology 1984, with K. E. Gillett). In her later work, she studied the vocalizations of voles, in "Ultrasonic vocalization and body temperature maintenance in infant voles of three species (Rodentia: Arvicolidae)" (Developmental Psychobiology 1992), and "Ultrasonic calling in isolated infant prairie voles (Microtus ochrogaster) and montane voles (M. montanus)" (Journal of Mammalogy 2002).

Blake worked at Drew University, Queen Mary College, Bennett College, and University of North Carolina at Greensboro. She was a member of the science professional fraternity Sigma Xi, and of the American Society of Mammalogists. From the latter organization, she received the Hartley H.T. Jackson Award in 2007. She was editor in chief of the Journal of Mammalogy.

== Personal life ==
Barbara Hibbs married Anthony Groverman Blake Jr. in 1962. They had daughters Virginia and Elizabeth (Eliza). Barbara Hibbs Blake died in 2019, aged 82 years, in Lincoln, Massachusetts. There is an Anthony and Barbara Blake Scholarship Fund at Guilford College in Greensboro, North Carolina.
