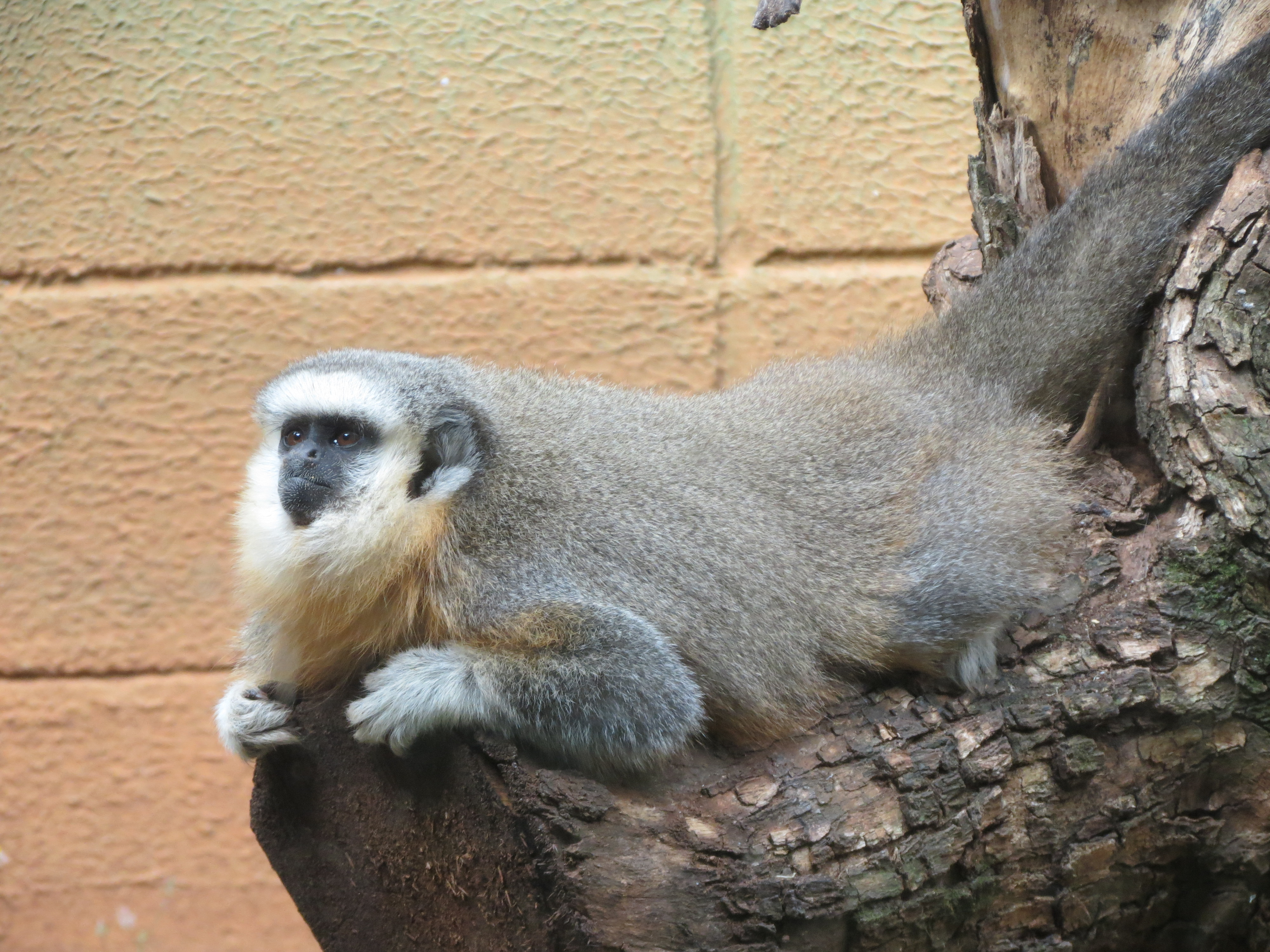

Conservation status
- Critically Endangered (IUCN 3.1)

Scientific classification
- Kingdom: Animalia
- Phylum: Chordata
- Class: Mammalia
- Infraclass: Placentalia
- Order: Primates
- Family: Pitheciidae
- Genus: Plecturocebus
- Species: P. vieirai

Binomial name
- Plecturocebus vieirai Gualda-Barros, Nascimento & Amaral, 2012

Synonyms
- Callicebus vieirai

= Vieira's titi monkey =

Vieira's titi

Species of New World monkey

Vieira's titi monkey (Plecturocebus vieirai) is a species of titi, a type of New World monkey, from central-northern Brazil.

== Taxonomy ==
Vieira's titi belongs to the New World monkey family Pitheciidae, which contains the titis (Callicebus), saki monkeys (Pithecia), bearded sakis (Chiropotes), and uakaris (Cacajao).

== Etymology ==
Plecturocebus vieirai is named after Professor Carlos Octaviano da Cunha Vieira (1897‑1958), a Brazilian mammalogist and former Curator of the Mammal Collection at the Museum of Zoology of the University of São Paulo (MZUSP), Brazil.
