= Mammalian Biology =

- Discipline: Mammalogy
- Language: English
- Edited by: Heiko G. Rödel

Publication details
- Former name(s): Zeitschrift für Säugetierkunde
- Publisher: Springer (International)
- Frequency: Bimonthly

Standard abbreviations
- ISO 4: Mamm. Biol.

Indexing
- ISSN: 1616-5047
- LCCN: 2001252340
- OCLC no.: 46654526

Links
- Homepage on Springer

Mammalian Biology (formerly Zeitschrift für Säugetierkunde) is a peer-reviewed bimonthly international scientific journal published by Springer Science+Business Media, also known as Springer, and edited by the German Society for Mammalian Biology.

The society was founded in 1926 and early volumes of its Zeitschrift für Säugetierkunde journal published mammalogists from Russia and the United States.

== See also ==
- Journal of Mammalogy
- Mammalian Species
