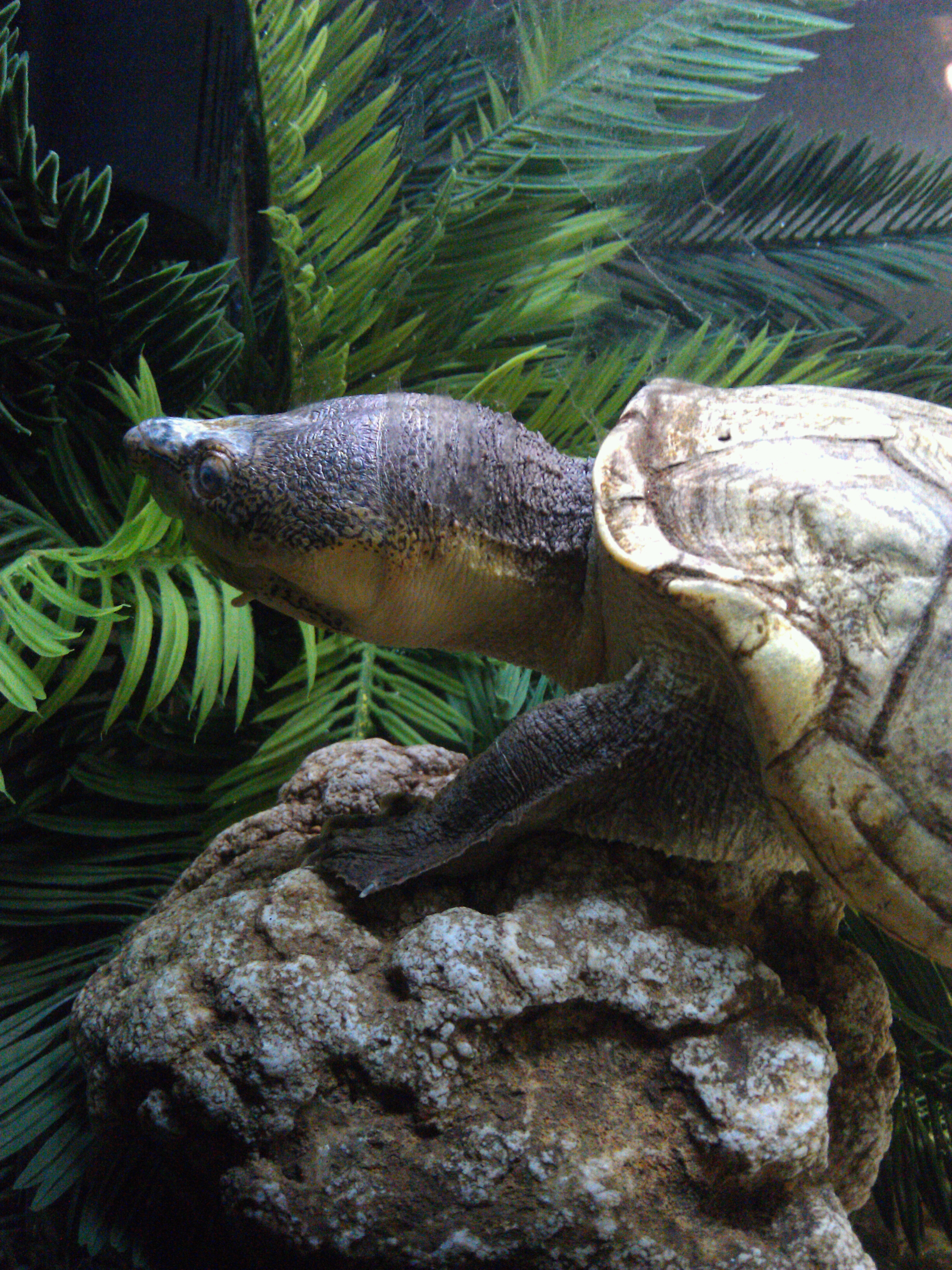

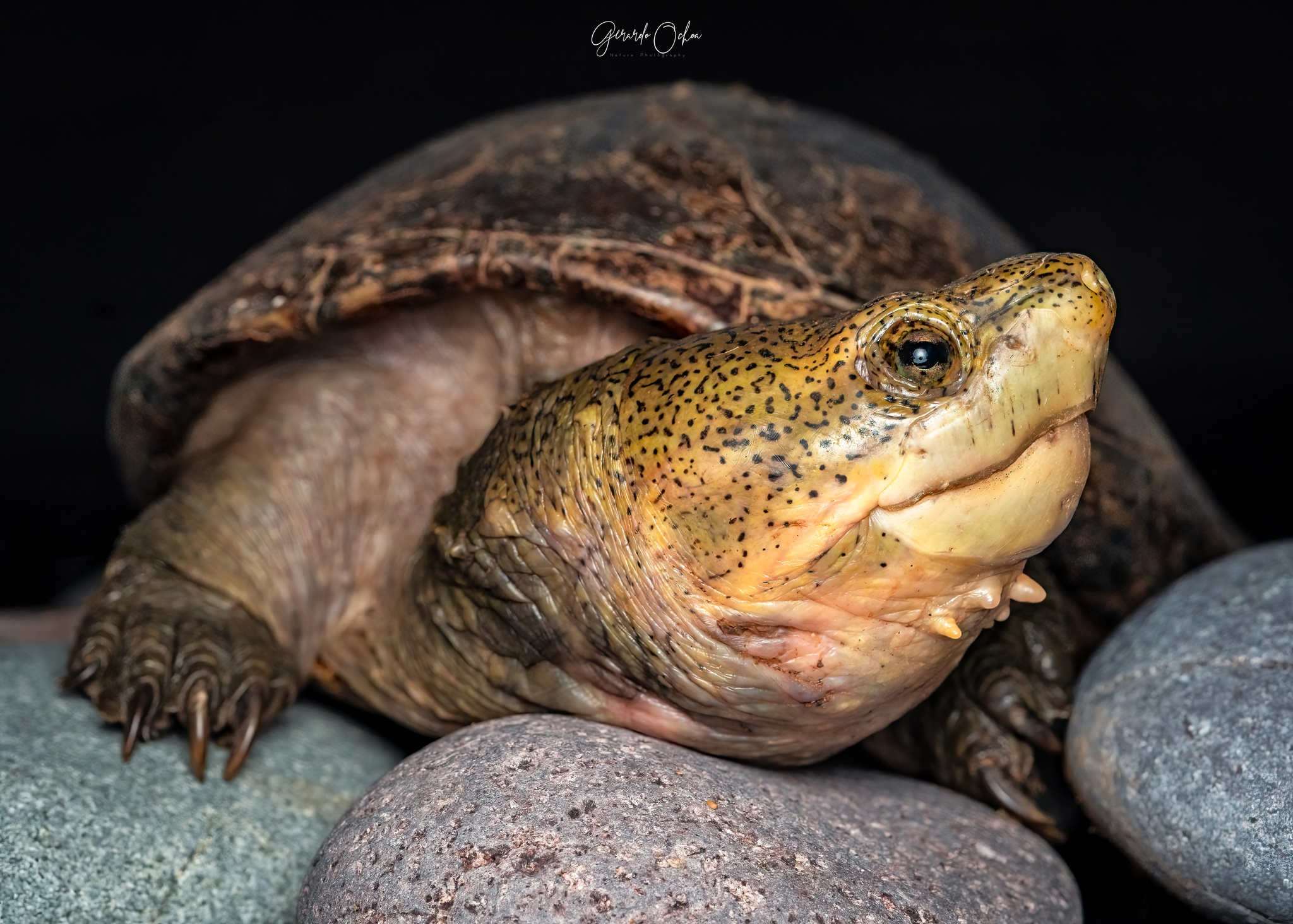

Conservation status
- Vulnerable (IUCN 3.1)

Scientific classification
- Kingdom: Animalia
- Phylum: Chordata
- Class: Reptilia
- Order: Testudines
- Suborder: Cryptodira
- Family: Kinosternidae
- Genus: Kinosternon
- Species: K. hirtipes

Binomial name
- Kinosternon hirtipes (Wagler, 1830)

Synonyms
- Kinosternon hirtipes hirtipes: Cinosternon hirtipes Wagler, 1830 (nomen nudum); Cinosternon hirtipes Wagler, 1833; Clemmys (Cinosternon) hirtipes — Fitzinger, 1835; Cinostermon [sic] hirtipes — Gray, 1844; Kinosternum hirtipes — LeConte, 1854; Kinosternon hirtipes — Gray, 1856; Cinosternum hirtipes — Agassiz, 1857; Thyrosternum hirtipes — Agassiz, 1857; Ozotheca hirtipes — LeConte, 1859; Chinosternum [sic] hirtipes — Caballero y Caballero, 1938; Kinosternon [hirtipes] hirtipes — Schmidt, 1953; Kynosternon [sic] hirtipes — Lopez, 1975; Kinosternon hertipes [sic] Semmler, Seidel & S. Williams, 1977 (ex errore); Kinosternon hirtipes chapalaense: Kinosternon hirtipes chapalaense Pritchard, 1979 (nomen nudum); Kinosternon hirtipes chapalaense Iverson, 1981; Kinosternon hirtipes chapalense [sic] Obst, 1996 (ex errore); Kinosternon hirtipes magdalense: Kinosternon hirtipes magdalense Iverson, 1981; Kinosternon hirtipes megacephalum: Kinosternon hirtipes megacephalum Iverson, 1981; Kinosternon hirtipes megalocephala [sic] Artner, 2003 (ex errore); Kinosternon megacephalum — Joseph-Ouni, 2004; Kinosternon hirtipes murrayi: Kinosternon murrayi Glass & Hartweg, 1951; Kinosternon hirtipes murrayi — Schmidt, 1953; Kinosternon hirtipes murryi [sic] Ashton, 1976 (ex errore); Kinosternon hirtipes tarascense: Kinosternon hirtipes tarascense Iverson, 1981

= Rough-footed mud turtle =

Species of turtle

The rough-footed mud turtle (Kinosternon hirtipes) is a species of mud turtle in the family Kinosternidae. The species is native to the southwestern United States and adjacent northern Mexico.

== Geographic range ==
Kinosternon hirtipes is found in the United States in Texas, and it is also found in Mexico in the Mexican states of Aguascalientes, Chihuahua, Coahuila, Mexico DF, Durango, Guanajuato, Jalisco, Mexico State, Michoacán, Morelos, and Zacatecas.

== Diet ==
As an omnivore, the diet of Kinosternon hirtipes primarily consists of vegetation and insects including filamentous algae, seeds and fruits, aquatic, terrestrial, flying arthropods, as well as aquatic gastropods. K. hirtipes undergoes a dietary shift from insects to vegetation as body size increases which facilitates rapid growth. Although male K. hirtipes are larger in size than females, both sexes share a dietary overlap consuming similar foods.

== Predation ==
Based on tracks around kill sites, bite marks and shell damage it has been determined that the main predators of Kinosternon hirtipes are raccoons (Procyon lotor) and feral pigs (Sus scrofa). Not surprisingly, both raccoons and pigs are known to hunt several other species of turtle. K. hirtipes seems to be relatively "immune" to predation but are at the highest risk when coming out of the water to nest.

== Subspecies ==
Six subspecies of Kinosternon hirtipes are recognized as being valid, including the nominotypical subspecies.

- Valley of Mexico mud turtle – Kinosternon hirtipes hirtipes (Wagler, 1830)
- Lake Chapala mud turtle – Kinosternon hirtipes chapalaense Iverson, 1981
- San Juanico mud turtle – Kinosternon hirtipes magdalense Iverson, 1981
- Viesca mud turtle – Kinosternon hirtipes megacephalum Iverson, 1981 (Extinct)
- Mexican Plateau mud turtle – Kinosternon hirtipes murrayi Glass & Hartweg, 1951
- Patzcuarco mud turtle – Kinosternon hirtipes tarascense Iverson, 1981

== Gallery ==
Kinosternon hirtipes murrayi

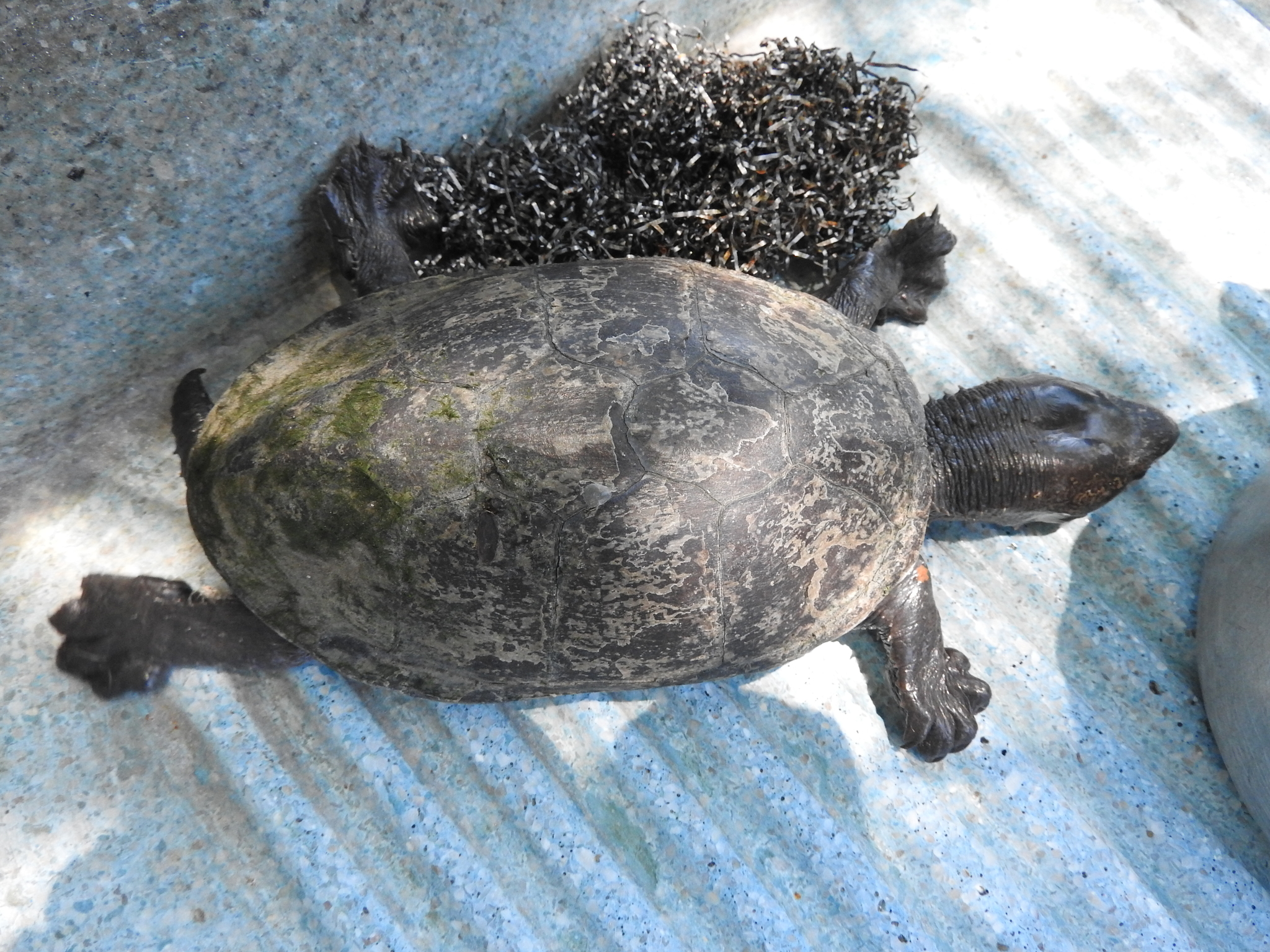
Guanajuato

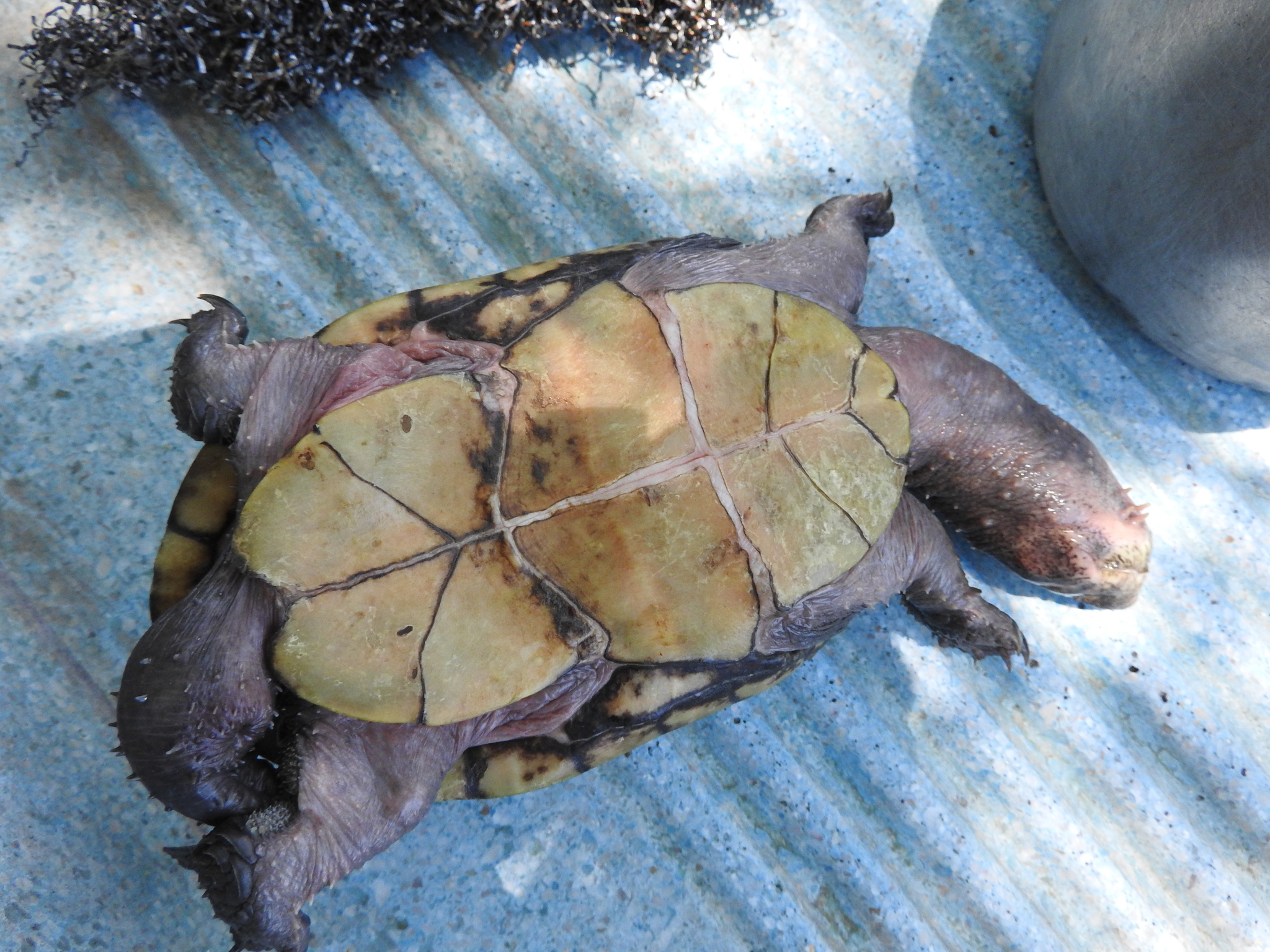
Guanajuato

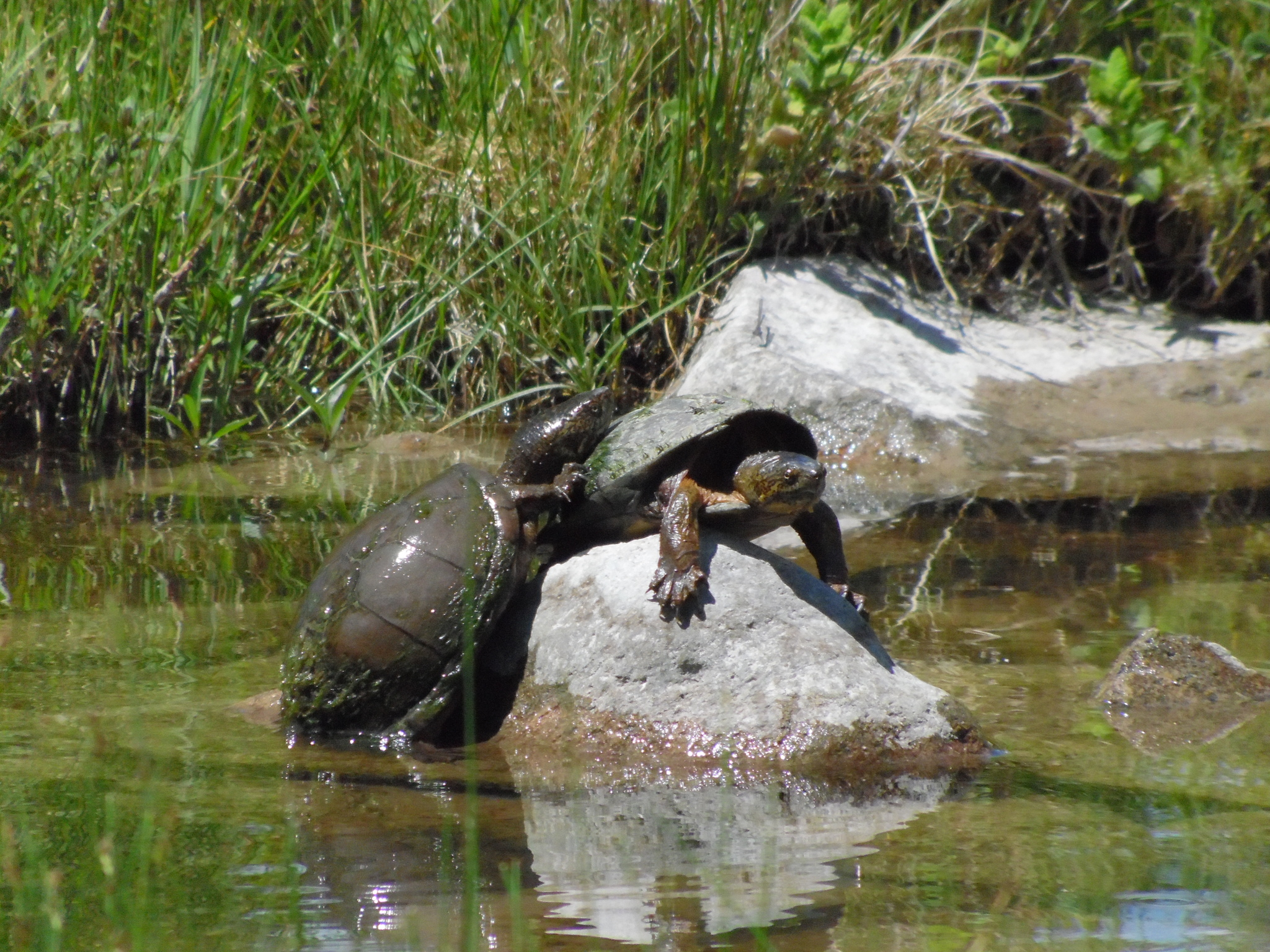
Basking, Chihuahua

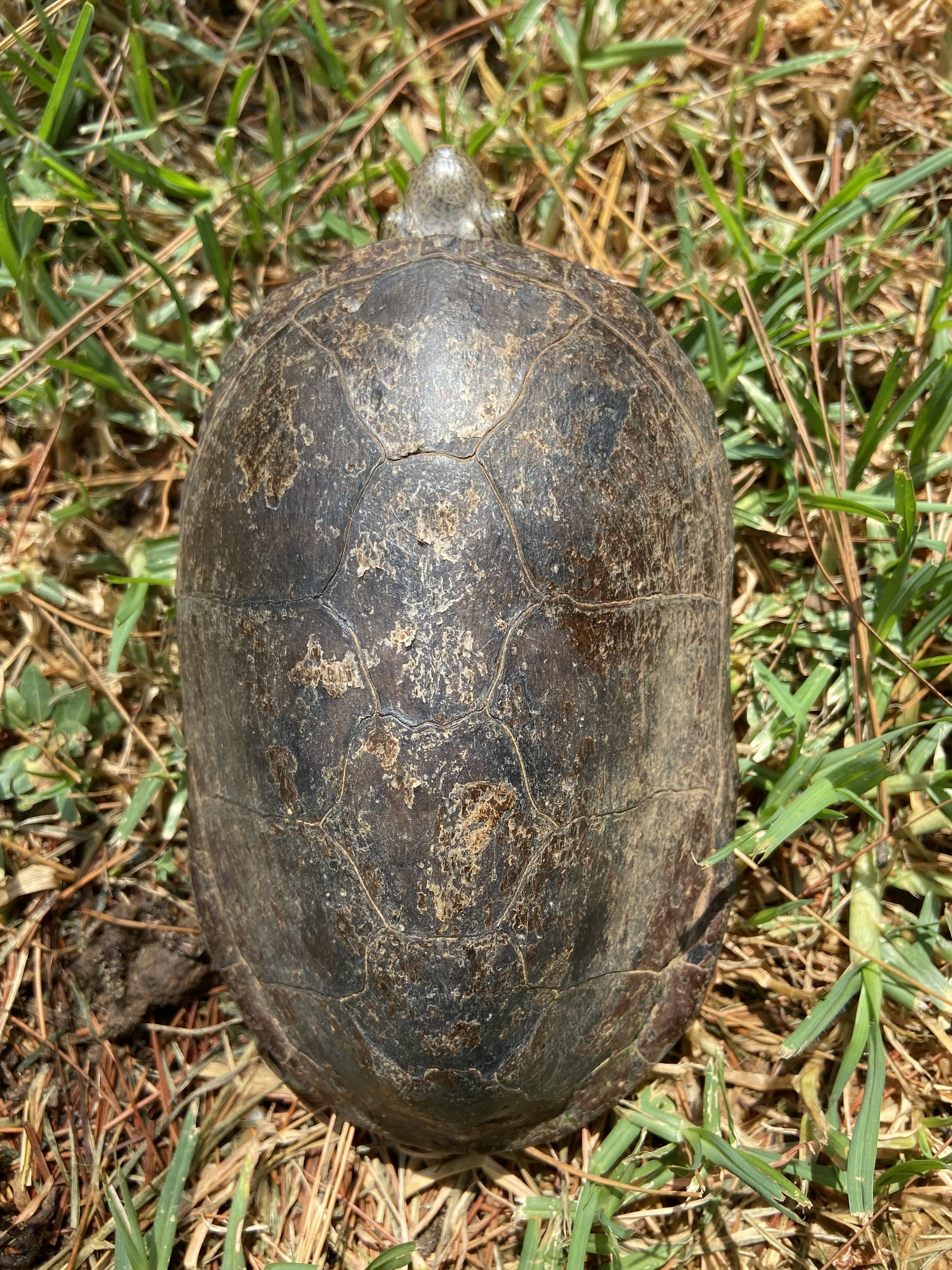
Michoacán

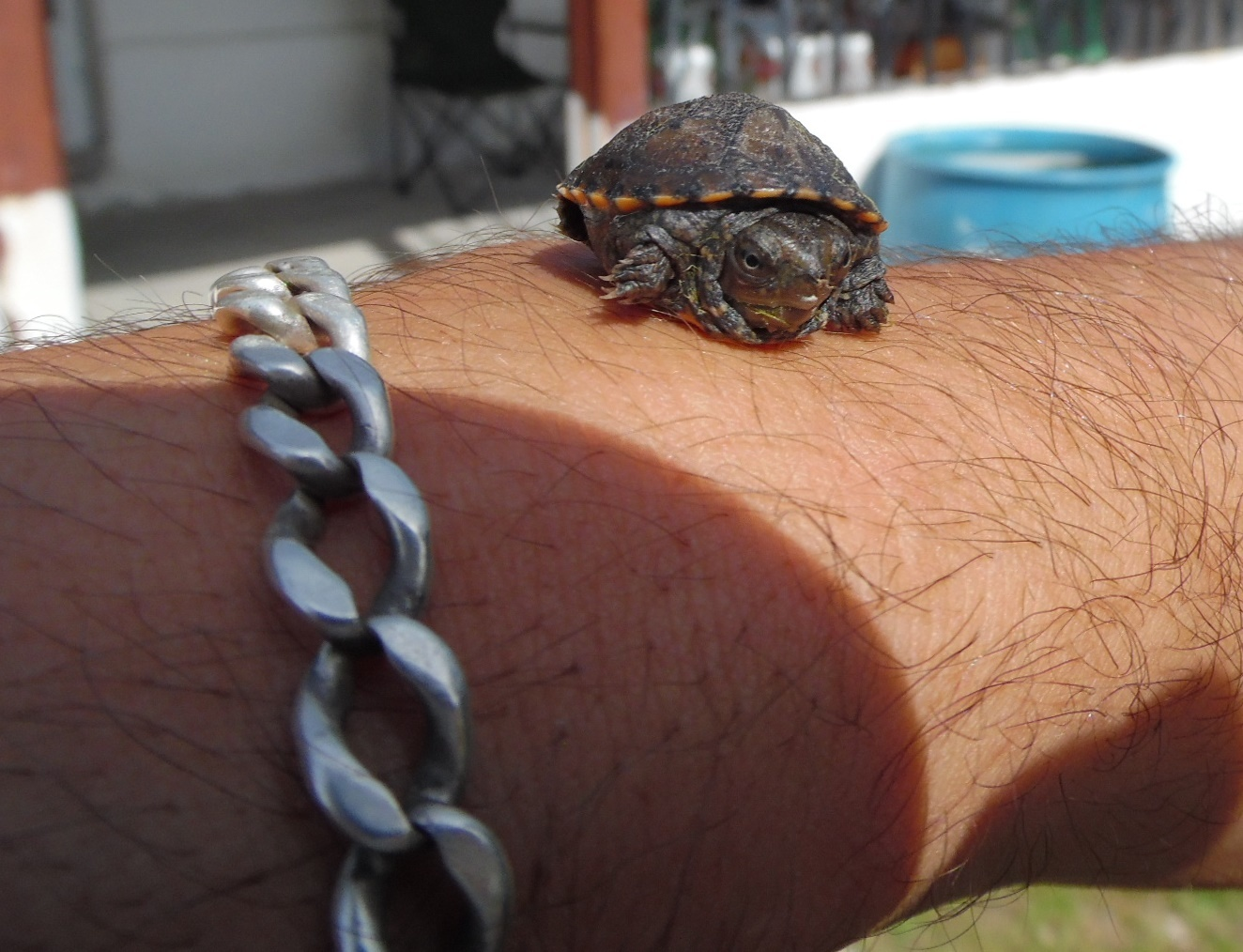
Hatchling, Chihuahua

== Etymology ==
The subspecific name, murrayi, is in honor of American zoologist Leo Tildon Murray (1902–1958).
