= Carlos Octaviano da Cunha Vieira =

Brazilian zoologist (1897–1958)

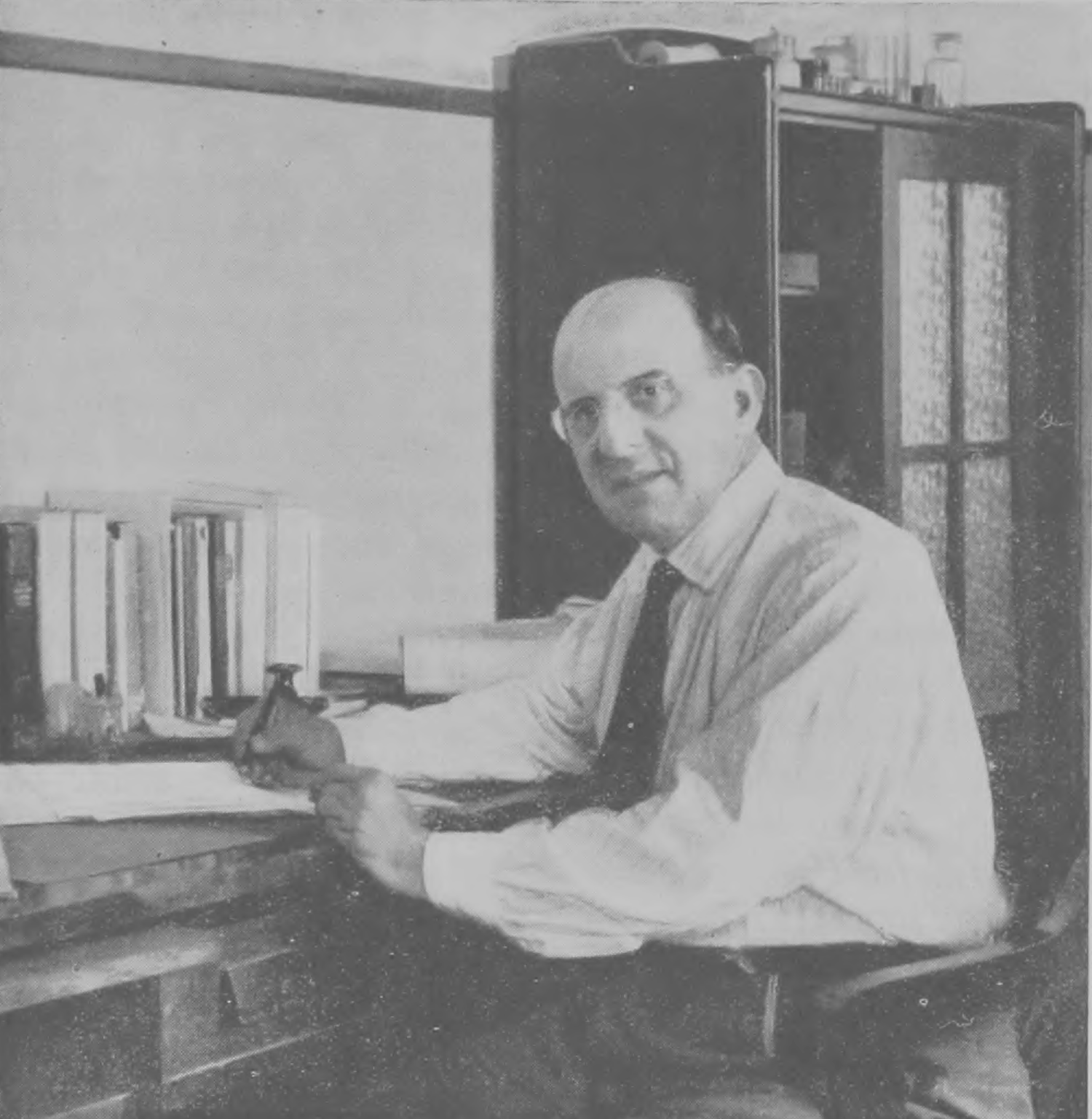
- Born: October 20, 1897; Jundiaí
- Died: September 8, 1958; São Paulo
- Education: Universidade de São Paulo

Carlos Octaviano da Cunha Vieira (Jundiaí, October 20, 1897 – São Paulo, September 8, 1958) was a Brazilian mammalogist and ornithologist.

== Life ==
Vieira finished his undergraduate course on Pharmacy in the Faculdade de Farmácia e Odontologia (currently part of Universidade de São Paulo), in November 1920. After graduating, in 1928, Vieira was hired as Zoological Collection Conservator of the Museu Paulista. The zoological collections of Museu Paulista were transferred to Museu de Zoologia da USP in the 1940s.

Vieira began his scientific career publishing articles on birds, but his main contributions to zoology were in the field of mammalogy. Among his many publications between 1940 and 1950, it is noteworthy the "Ensaio monográfico sôbre os Quiropteros do Brasil" (published in 1942) and the "Lista remissiva dos mamíferos do Brasil" (published in 1955). Vieira was one of the first Brazilians to publish on the mammal fauna of the country.

== Honors ==
Vieira has several taxa named in this honor: one species of titi monkey (Callicebus vieirai) one spiny rat (Echimys vieirai), and a nectar-feeding bat (Xeronycteris vieirai).

== Described taxa ==
Vieira has described a species of bat (Neoplatymops mattogrossensis), a subspecies of bat (Thyroptera tricolor juquiaensis), and a subspecies of coati (Nasua nasua aricana).
