= Mastology =

Mastology may refer to:

- the study of the human breast and related illnesses
- Mammalogy, the subset of zoology that studies mammals
