= Bryan Glass =

Bryan Glass may refer to:

- Bryan P. Glass (1919–2010), American mammalogist
- Bryan J. L. Glass, American comic book writer
