= Reginald Innes Pocock =

British zoologist (1863–1947)

Reginald Innes Pocock FRS
- Born: 4 March 1863; Clifton, Bristol, England
- Died: 9 August 1947 (aged 84); London, England
- Resting place: Kensal Green Cemetery
- Education: University College, Bristol
- Known for: Arachnida, Myriapoda, and Mammals
- Scientific career
- Fields: Zoology
- Workplaces: Natural History Museum, London; London Zoo
- Author abbrev. (zoology): Pocock

Reginald Innes Pocock, F.R.S. (4 March 1863 – 9 August 1947) was a British zoologist. He was associated with the Natural History Museum, London and the London Zoo. He was a noted expert on the taxonomy of Arachnida and Myriapoda, and also made extensive studies of mammals, especially those from India. He helped pioneer external morphology as a means of classifying mammals.

== Early life ==
Pocock was born in Clifton, Bristol on 4 March 1863. He was the fourth son of Rev. Nicholas Pocock and Edith Prichard. His maternal grandfather was James Cowles Prichard, a physician and ethnologist. His great grandfather was marine artist Captain Nicholas Pocock.

For preparatory school, Pocock attended Frank Townsend's School in Clifton. He was an artist and played rugby, joining the Clifton Rugby Football Club for 1883 to 1884 season, following his brothers, Edward, Herbert, and William. He also played lawn tennis and lacrosse, and competed in the long jump and short distance running.

Pocock attended St Edward's School, Oxford, where he showed an interest in natural history. He frequently visited the Zoological Gardens at Clifton and learned how to raise lizards, mice, and turtles. He received tutoring in zoology from the biologist Edward Bagnall Poulton, and studied comparative anatomy at the Oxford Museum. Pocock then studied biology and geology at University College, Bristol, under C. Lloyd Morgan and William Johnson Sollas.

== Career ==
In 1885, Pocock secured an assistantship with the Zoological Department of the British Museum, now the Natural History Museum, London. He was assigned to arrange the British bird collections in the public gallery and developed a lasting interest in ornithology. He was then assigned to the entomology department, where he in charge of the Arachnida and Myriapoda collections. He worked for the museum for eighteen years and significantly expanded its entomological collections, becoming a known authority on Arachnida and Myriapoda.

While with the museum, Pocock published 200 papers, featuring his illustrations. These papers described between 300 and 400 species of millipedes and the scorpion genus Brachistosternus. He examined the collections made by John Anderson in 1887. He examined scorpions from India and collections were made by H. M. Phipson and Edgar Thurston for him. This led to a volume for the Fauna of British India in 1888. He worked on a comprehensive study of the solifuges of India and Ceylon which was published in the Journal of the Bombay Natural History Society.

In 1929, he proposed the family Nandiniidae, with the genus Nandinia as its sole member. He argued that it differs from the Aeluroidea by the structure and shape of its ear canal and mastoid part of the temporal bone.

In 1897, Pocock found a Quagga specimen in the Bristal Museum; he studied this extinct mammal and concluded that it was related to the zebra. This was the subject of his first article about mammals. He then helped Philip. Sclater, the secretary of the Zoological Society of London, finish Book of Antelopes. Pocock and Oldfield Thomas, head of the museum's mammal section, travled to the Balearic Islands where they collected specimens of mammals, arachnids, and myriapods. Pocock's interest in mammals grew, resulting in several papers that were published in Nature.

Pocock wanted to shift to the study of mammals, but there were no open positions in the Mammalian Department of the museum. In 1904, he left his position as a senior assistant at the museum to become superintendent of the Zoological Garden at Regent’s Park, London, now the London Zoo. Although his new position was administrative, he worked to improve the living conditions for the animals, studied the living animals, and also began collecting the skulls and skins of animals that died. Because he lived on site in the former curator's house, Pocock could continue his studies in the evening and weekends, watching the living animals and examining the deceased animals in the prosectorium (dissecting room). This was also a period when he made a collecting trip to Spain with Oldfield Thomas.

As he studied the mammals, Pocock recognized the importance of ears, hooves, and other external features in the identification of species. He wrote several papers on the topic, helping to pioneer morphology as a means of classifying mammals. He also revised the genus Cercopithecus and wrote papers on carnivores, primates, and ungulates. Pocock was elected a fellow with the Royal Society in 1911. When he retired in March 1923 after nineteen years with the Zoological Garden, he had become a leading mammalogist.

Pocock dedicated his retirement to mammalogy. He became a temporary scientific worker or volunteer in the Mammalian Department of the British Museum. He wrote numerous papers for the Journal of the Bombay Natural History Society that described the Asiatic lion, civet, colobinae, lagur, and leopard. These articles were important in advancing the understanding of Indian natural history. In 1939 and 1941, Pocock wrote two of the Mammalia volumes of the second edition of the The Fauna of British India, Including Ceylon and Burma, noting the inadequacies of the first edition and presenting "a new, more systematic approach to mammalogy". Pocock also introduced a system of trinomial nomenclature.

Pocock was the nature editor of The Field for many years and a contributor to Encyclopædia Britannica. When he died, Pocock was working on the Catalogue of the Felidae in the British Museum and a third volume of The Fauna of British India, Including Ceylon and Burma; the latter was too incomplete for publication.

== Legacy ==
Pocock's legacy includes describing more than 85 extant mammals. In the 21st century, his papers continue to be widely cited, and some of his systematic proposals for generic and suprageneric levels are accepted by the field. In 2018, an article in Mammalia noted that, "It is safe to say that much of what we know about several of the rarest and recently extinct mammals of the world is due to the work of Reginald Innes Pocock", noting that the papers and monographs that he wrote in his retirement "rank among the classical works on mammalian morphology and taxonomy." Pocock was the first to classify primates into two subgroups, the Haplorhini and the Strepsirrhini, based on the nostril separation and established felid phylogenetic relationships; both are still in use.

== Personal life ==
In 1899, Pocock married Constance Osborne, the daughter of a squire from Leicestershire. She was a poet and author. They had one daughter and four sons; only Constantine Innes Pocock. survived childhood. Contance died in 1942.

When he moved to London in 1885, Pocock played rugby for the Blackheath F.C. until the early 1890s. He was a volunteer with the Artists' Corps in London. Pocock was a member of the Savile Club.

At the age of 84, Pocock died in his sleep from coronary thrombosis at his home in London on 9 August 1947. He was buried in Kensal Green Cemetery in London.

== Selected works ==
- Pocock, R. I. (1893). "On some points in the morphology of the Arachnida (s.s) with notes on the classification of the group". Annals and Magazine of Natural History. 6. 11 (61): 1–19. doi:10.1080/00222939308677457.
- Pocock, R. I. (July 1897). "The Species and Subspecies of Zebras". Annals and Magazine of Natural History. 6. 20: 33–52.
- Pocock, R. I. (1900). The Fauna of British India, including Ceylon and Burma. Arachnida. London: Trustees of the British Museum.
- Pocock, R. I. (1901). "Some new and old genera of South American Aviculariidae". The Annals and Magazine of Natural History. 7. 8 (48): 540–555. doi:10.1080/03745480109443359.
- Pocock, R. I. (1902). "Arachnida. Scorpiones, Pedipalpi, and Solifugae". Biologia Centrali-Americana: zoology, botany and archaeology. London: R. H. Porter.
- Pocock, R. I. (1903). "On some genera and species of South-American Aviculariidae". Annals and Magazine of Natural History. 7. 11 (61): 81–115. doi:10.1080/00222930308678729.
- Pocock, R. I. (1917). "The Classification of existing Felidae". The Annals and Magazine of Natural History. 8. XX: 329–350. doi:10.1080/00222931709487018.
- Pocock, R. I. (1930). "The Panthers and Ounces of Asia". Journal of the Bombay Natural History Society. 34 (1): 65–82.
- Pocock, R. I. (1932). "The marbled, Pardofelis marmorata, cat and some other Oriental species, with a definition of a new genus of the Felidae". Proceedings of the Zoological Society of London. 102 (3): 741–766. doi:10.1111/j.1096-3642.1932.tb01095.x..
- Pocock, R.I. (July 1932). "The Leopards of Africa". Proceedings of the Zoological Society of London. pp. 543–591. doi:10.1111/j.1096-3642.1932.tb01085.x.
- Pocock, R. I. (1939). The Fauna of British India, including Ceylon and Burma – Mammalia. Volume 1, Primates and Carnivora. London: Trustees of the British Museum/Taylor and Francis.
- Pocock, R. I. (1940). "Description of a new race of puma (Puma concolor), with a note on an abnormal tooth growth in the genus". The Annals and Magazine of Natural History. 11. VI: 307–313. doi:10.1080/03745481.1940.9723683.
- Pocock, R. I. (1941). The Fauna of British India, including Ceylon and Burma – Mammalia. Volume 2, Carnivora: Aeluroidea, Arctoidea. London: Trustees of the British Museum/Taylor and Francis.
- Pocock, R. I. (1951). Catalogue of the Genus Felis. London: Trustees of the British Museum.
