= Mammalian Species =

- Discipline: Mammalogy
- Language: English
- Edited by: Luis A. Ruedas

Publication details
- History: 1969–present
- Publisher: American Society of Mammalogists (United States)
- Frequency: Upon acceptance

Standard abbreviations
- ISO 4: Mamm. Species

Indexing
- CODEN: MLNSBP
- ISSN: 0076-3519 (print); 1545-1410 (web)
- LCCN: 2004204506
- JSTOR: 00763519
- OCLC no.: 46381503

Links
- Journal homepage; Online archive

Mammalian Species is a peer-reviewed scientific journal published by Oxford University Press on behalf of the American Society of Mammalogists. The journal publishes accounts of 12–35 mammal species yearly. The articles summarize the current literature about each mammal and its systematics, genetics, fossil history, distribution, anatomy, physiology, behavior, ecology, and conservation is described. The journal was established in 1969. The current editor-in-chief is Luis A. Ruedas (Portland State University).

== Indexing and abstracting ==
The journal is abstracted and indexed in:

- Biological Abstracts
- BIOSIS Previews
- Scopus
- The Zoological Record

== See also ==
- Journal of Mammalogy
