= The Mammal Society =

British charity

- Formation: 1954
- Legal status: Non-profit company and registered charity
- Purpose: For Evidence-based Conservation.
- Location: 18, St. John's Church Rd., London, E9 6EJ.
- Region served: UK
- Members: Academics, professional ecologists, enthusiasts and conservationists
- Website: www.mammal.org.uk

The Mammal Society is a British charity devoted to the research and conservation of British mammals.

The Mammal Society was formed in 1954, and the inaugural spring conference took place the following year at The University of Exeter.

The Mammal Society has a membership of around 2000 mammalogists, ecologists, conservationists, both experts and enthusiasts, all working to develop greater understanding of mammals and the conservation challenges they face. The Society runs national surveys for mammals, for example Mini Mammal Monitoring.

The Mammal Society is also working to address the problem that mammals in the British Isles are severely under-recorded, resulting in a lack of mammal conservation progress. The Mammal Society is determined to overcome this by creating a National Mammal Atlas to provide vital information on mammal distribution and abundance so that informed conservation decisions can be made for species in need. In order to achieve this they are collating national mammal data and records to gather up to date information.

The Mammal Society offers a wide range of expert-led training courses for consultants, conservationists and enthusiasts alike, covering ecology, technical skills and surveying.

The Society's president is Penny Lewns, and its current Chair is Dr Stephanie Wray.

== Publications ==
The Mammal Society publishes a number of informative books for conservationists, enthusiasts and consultants alike, as well as a high impact scientific journal, Mammal Review.

In June 2012, The Mammal Society published UK BAP Mammals: Interim Guidelines for Survey Methodologies, Impact Assessment & Mitigation for species for which there was previously no available guidance.

The 4th edition of Mammals of the British Isles: Handbook is a reference work published by the Mammal Society covering the biology, ecology and conservation of every mammal species occurring in Britain and Ireland. The 3rd edition had been published in 1991 and was subsequently out of print. More than 100 contributors, mostly members of the Mammal Society, worked on the 800-page 4th edition, which was published in 2008. It includes species accounts summarizing the ecology, biology and conservation status of each mammal found in or around the British Isles.
