= Wiley B. Glass =

Southern Baptist missionary (1874–1967)

Wiley B. Glass (born 1874 - November 14, 1967), was a Southern Baptist missionary, who worked at the North China Mission in Huangxian, Shandong, China. He was best known in China by his local name Kuo Mu-Shih.

== Overview ==
Glass's primary work was teaching and leading the North China Mission's Seminary which produced many Christian leaders. This work led to a growth in the Chinese Church. He also led many famine relief projects and, with his colleagues and local Christians, helped to establish a Red Cross Organization.

== Early life ==
Glass was born in 1874 in Franklin County, Texas, US to Henry Clay and Teedie Glass. His mother prayed for him and his father, asking, "O God, take this child, keep him and use him. And save his father, please." Not much later his father had a powerful conversion experience and lived a life of religious devotion.

On one occasion, he and his sister were travelling to a Methodist revival meeting. His sister pleaded with him to give his life to Christ. The following morning the preacher spoke on the Revelation 3:20, and Glass let the Lord know that he needed and wanted him, and in that moment he felt the Lord had heard him and he walked forward and gave his life to Christ.

Glass was later asked to lead a church. some experience in preaching he entered Baylor College. One of his professors, Dr. Tanner, became a profound influence on his life. One day Dr Tanner heard news of the Boxer Rebellion, a military uprising in which Chinese Christians and "foreign" missionaries were killed. He told Glass, "These things are added proof of [China's] need of the gospel. If China had been Christian, this would not be happening." This moved Glass to become more zealous about foreign missions. (p. 33) Soon afterwards a revival on campus brought many Baylor students, including Wiley Glass, to a sense of a calling to missions. Glass set out for China in 1903 with his wife.

== Family ==
Glass married Eunice Taylor on July 22, 1903. She died of TB in 1913.

The couple had five children, Taylor, Bentley, Lois, Eloise and Wiley.

Glass married Jessi Pettigrew on March 13, 1916.

The couple had two children, Gertrude and Bryan.

== Work in China ==
=== Training and relief work ===
The Glasses began working with the Southern Baptist Convention's North China Mission and were first set up in Laizhou to study language. They had their first baby, Taylor, in August. Unfortunately he caught pneumonia. By the time Glass could reach the doctor, Taylor was too sick and later died.

Glass continued to study the Chinese language and got his teacher, Mr Sun, to read the Gospel of John. This was the first man he led to Christ.Soon nearly the whole village of forty to fifty families was led to Christ. In 1906 the Glasses had their second child, Bentley.

In the following year the World Missions Conference was held in Shanghai, and Glass represented the North China Mission. By this time, 100 years had passed since Robert Morrison arrived from England as the first Protestant missionary to China and there were nearly a quarter of a million Christians in China. Shortly after the conference the dikes in the Yellow River burst and destroyed many homes and drowned thousands. Glass and fellow missionary John Lowe went to Chingkiang and volunteered to help the victims. This helped to raise support and awareness for China and to attract additional missionaries, as well as increasing Chinese respect for "foreigners." After weeks as a relief worker, Glass returned home, and his first daughter, named Lois Corneille, was born not long afterward on November 25, 1907.

=== Teaching work ===
In 1908 a new step in Glass's mission career arrived when he became part of the staff for the North China Baptist Training School for Preachers and Teachers in Huangxian. He felt that through teaching he could multiply the work of the mission by sending numerous native Chinese out to share the gospel. These Chinese Christian workers went throughout Shandong Provinces and into Henan, Anhui and Manchuria. In this time, the student body grew to 40. It was in Huangxian that the Glasses' second daughter, Eloise, named for Eunice's favorite sister-in-law, was born.

After seven years in China the family took their first furlough back to the US in 1910. Glass spent most of the time traveling in the Southern states, including Alabama, and traveled to several Northern cities to tell Christians about what God was doing in China.

=== Political unrest in China ===
Following their furlough, the Glasses returned to a much disturbed China, where the regime of the Empress Dowager was tottering and emerging plans for a modern China were challenging the old ways. Armed revolutionaries marched across Shandong Province, so the Glass family moved to Yantai where Eunice might be able to have her expected baby in peace. (p. 74)

The seminary in Huangxian was closed during this time, and anyone without a hair queue was subject to beheading. Several Chinese Christians, sympathetic to the new movement, cut their hair. Because of the family felt they should return to Huangxian to protect these men and to establish the Red Cross organization they were planning. The Glasses and Bessie Hartwell, a fellow missionary's wife, returned to Huangxian despite the military conflict there. They connected with Lottie Moon at the Southern Baptist hospital in that city.

By October 1912, cities in northern China had declared their sympathy with the revolution and ousted the imperial government officials. (p. 76). Eventually, however, imperialists took control of the city and many men not wearing queues were executed. Many Chinese Christians (some of whom had no queues) gained neutral status through their work for the Red Cross and were spared the death penalty.

Soon after this, baby Wiley had dysentry and died. Eunice also feel ill with pleurisy. Glass wrote home saying, "Heaven is nearer and Christ is dearer with our two boys over there in His arms." He signed the letter, "your sorrowing brother and sister" (p. 86).

The following years in China were difficult. The revolution was followed by famine and a three year drought. During this time Lottie Moon's colleagues decided that she should return to the US, and she died on the ship home, in Kobe, Japan. (p. 87).

Despite the difficulties, the mission was growing - "In [Laizhou] a building had been dedicated for the Woman's Training School, and 2 churches had been organized. The North China Mission had 5 stations with work extending from Manchuria on the north to the extreme southwest of [Shandong]. There were 26 churches; they baptized 1003 during the year, about one fourth of the total membership. One day at Pignut 130 were baptized… Sunday schools numbered 95. [The] 111 day and boarding schools had 1,848 pupils and 3 hospitals treated 25,800 patients". (p. 87-88).

== Widowhood and remarriage ==
Later Eunice took the children on vacation to Yantai and became ill and was diagnosed with tuberculosis. She refused to leave China, as she did not wish to hinder the mission work. She died on April 19. Glass wrote to his brother and sisters at home, "I would be untrue to her glorious, courageous example as she faced the future and endured for nine long months such weariness, pain and anxiety, so joyously, if I were not as brave as she. The inspiration of her pure, noble life is mine forever. I find God's face not turned from me, but a consciousness of His nearness and love and strength constantly at hand." Still, Glass's grief and the strain of finances made it hard to push on (p. 92). Glass decided to send his children to boarding school.

He was very lonely at Huangxian but a new seminary colleague and opportunities kept his mind busy, as he procured Christian literature for the churches, opened stores to sell this literature, and arranged for its distribution. (p. 92)

Glass opened shops to sell Christian literature and began housing missionaries to fill his home. In 1915 he became president of the North China Mission. At this time he met a missionary and nurse called Jessi L Pettigrew who took care of the children when they were not at school. They fell in love and married on March 13, 1916, in Japan.

== Jessie Pettigrew Glass ==
Jessie Pettigrew was born on April 7, 1877, in Tazwell County, Virginia, US. She completed her nursing training in New Orleans with a view to missionary work and was the first nurse appointed by the Foreign Mission Board in 1902 and worked at the newly opened the Warren Memorial Hospital in Huangxian.

== Revival ==
By this time, there were so many that Christians in the area that Lung K'o Baptist church was opened on November 7, 1916. Glass was chosen to be the pastor.

In 1932 revival broke out and numerous people came to Christ. This helped to prepare the people during the persecution when missionaries were forced to leave and financial support from abroad was taken away. Later Glass became pastor of Tengchow church (Lottie Moon's original post).

== Japanese invasion ==
When Huangxian came under Japanese control, forty years of mission work in that area came to a close when the authorities demanded that all Christian schools be closed and Confucianism was the only belief system to be followed. The Warren Memorial Hospital was also closed after the Japanese declared they could only see patients with a permit yet refused to grant any.

Following this the Glasses moved to Yantai. There were food shortages and many churches were closing. Soon all foreigners were assigned to housing units and Glass and other missionaries were interned for a time.

== Return to the US ==
Eventually the family sailed back to the US and they arrived in New York City in November 1943. By this time Glass was almost 70 years old, but there were still many requests from missionaries for him to continue his work. At this time he began ministering to Chinese air cadets who were training at Kelly Field, San Antonio, Texas. Many of them became Christians.(p. 214).

Glass was not able to return to China due to the Communist takeover. All foreigners were either forced to leave or decided to go for the sake of the Chinese Christians. Sometimes Glass was asked if he had not thrown his life away - had all the labors in China gone down the drain? Glass told them, 'No', I am completely satisfied with having given my life to mission work in China. I just wish I had another to give. Although church and mission buildings have been appropriated by the government or destroyed, God remains. And hundreds of thousands of people continue in him and in serving others in his name. The fires that now burn to destroy the Christian religion in China are the crucible of purification that will produce a more virile Christian church - a church that will bless the world in the years ahead."

For the rest of their lives, Glass and Jessi travelled extensively, teaching, preaching and sharing news about the work in China.

== Final years and legacy ==
The family moved to Fort Worth, Texas, where Glass taught Sunday school at the Gambrell Street Baptist Church there. Jessi died on October 14, 1962. Glass died on November 14, 1967.

His daughter Lois became a missionary in Taiwan and Japan.

His daughter, Eloise Glass Cauthen, and her husband, Baker James Cauthen (an official in the Southern Baptist Convention Foreign Mission Board), followed in his footsteps and served the Chinese for many years. Eloise also wrote his biography Higher Ground.

== See also ==
- Cauthen, Eloise Glass (1978). Higher ground : biography of Wiley B. Glass, missionary to China. Nashville, Tenn.: Broadman Press. ISBN 978-0-8054-7221-9.
- Branyon, Beth Miss Jesse (Pettigrew Glass): Missionary Nurse in China (juvenile) Providence House Publishers, Franklin, Tenn., 1997 Order 1881576779.html
