= Bryan P. Glass =

- Born: August 21, 1919; Mandeville, Louisiana
- Died: August 27, 2010 (aged 91); Perkins, Oklahoma
- Education: Baylor University (B.A. 1940), Texas A&M University (M.A., 1946), Oklahoma A&M University (Ph.D, 1952)
- Scientific career
- Fields: Mammalogy
- Workplaces: Oklahoma State University

Bryan Pettigrew Glass (August 21, 1919 – August 27, 2010) was an American mammalogist.

== Early life and education ==
The son of Baptist missionaries Wiley B. Glass and Jessie Pettigrew Glass, Bryan Glass was raised in China. He had three sisters and a brother. Lois and Eloise became missionaries; Eloise was also author. Trudy joined the staff of the United Nations. Bentley became a noted geneticist and educator.

Glass was a graduate of the China Inland Mission School in Chefoo. He continued his education in the United States, earning his Bachelor's from Baylor University in 1940, his Master's from Texas A&M in 1946, and his Ph.D. from Oklahoma A&M in 1952.

== Career ==
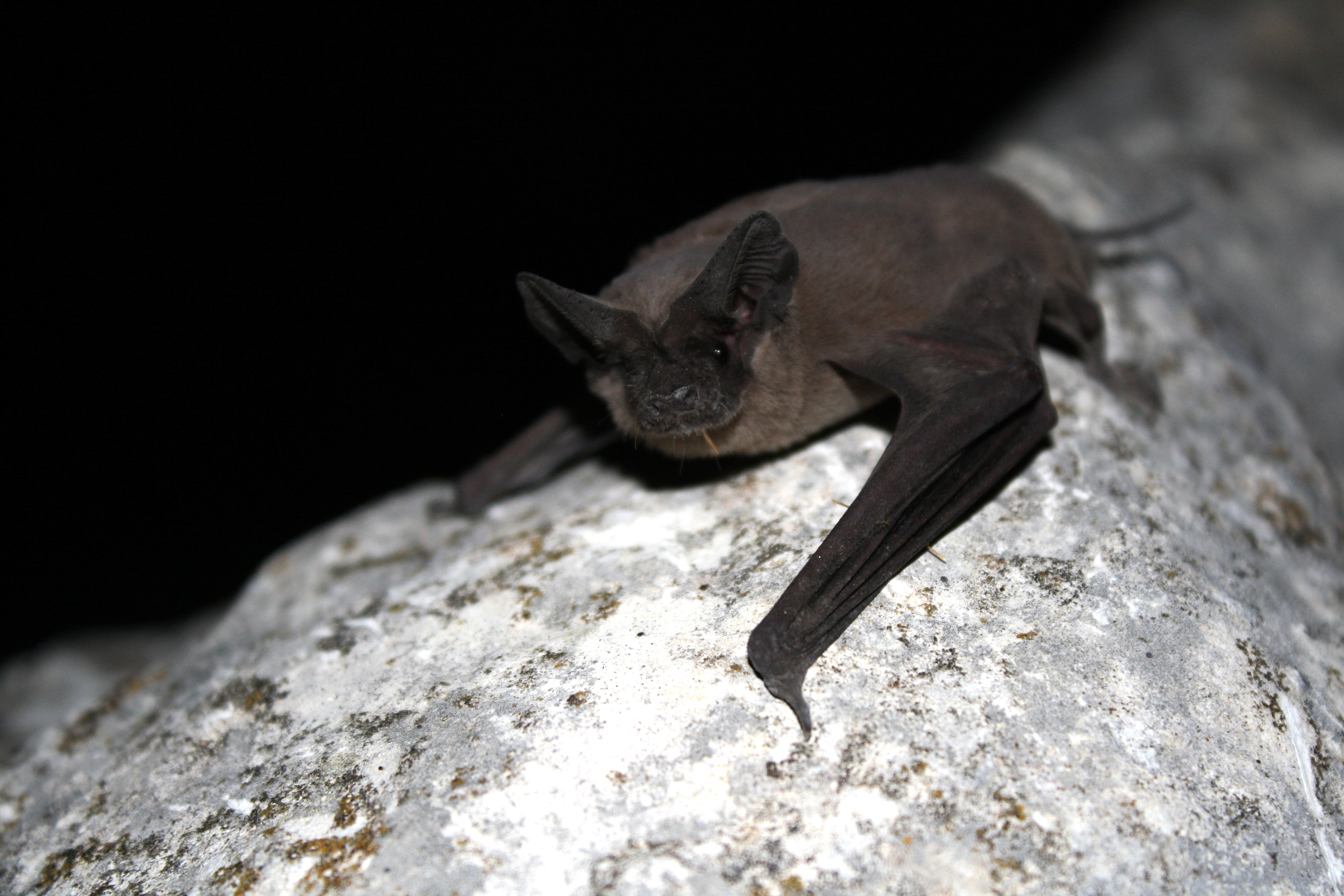
Mexican free-tailed bat (USFWS/Ann Froschauer)

During World War II, Glass served as a captain in the Army Air Corps and as an intelligence officer in the Office of Strategic Services (OSS).

Glass joined the Oklahoma State University (OSU) faculty as a zoology professor in 1946 and taught at the university until his retirement in 1985. Glass received OSU's Outstanding Service and Outstanding Teacher Award (1965 and 1966, respectively). In 1966, Glass became Director of the University Museum. He was committed to developing the museum's collection. During the 1960s, Glass and Robert Ingersoll collected 1,200 mammalian specimens from Ethiopia's Harar region. Their contribution represents over 10% of OSU's collection of mammals.

Though he did some work in Ethiopia and Brazil, Glass's scientific interests were largely focused upon species in Oklahoma, particularly Microchiroptera. His research program—involving Oklahoma, Seminole, and Mexican free-tailed bats—was the subject of an Army training video.

Glass served as the Secretary-Treasurer of the American Society of Mammalogists (ASM) from 1957 to 1977, a period during which membership more than doubled.

== Personal life ==
In 1946, Glass married Carolyn Smith, who at various points worked for the U.S. Department of Agriculture, OSU, and ASM. They had two daughters, Janis Elizabeth and Peggy Lee. Glass was active in his church, served on the organizing board for the Cooperative Baptist Fellowship of Oklahoma, and was elected Second Vice President of the Oklahoma Baptist Convention.
