= Mato Grosso dog-faced bat =

Conservation status
- Least Concern (IUCN 3.1)

Scientific classification
- Kingdom: Animalia
- Phylum: Chordata
- Class: Mammalia
- Order: Chiroptera
- Family: Molossidae
- Genus: Neoplatymops; Peterson, 1965
- Species: N. mattogrossensis

Binomial name
- Neoplatymops mattogrossensis Vieira, 1942

Synonyms
- Molossops mattogrossensis Vieira, 1942

Species of bat

The Mato Grosso dog-faced bat (Neoplatymops mattogrossensis), is a bat species found in South America. It is the only species in the genus Neoplatymops.

== Taxonomy and etymology ==
It was described as a new species in 1942 by C. O. C. Vieira. The holotype was collected along the Juruena River north of the Brazilian state of Mato Grosso.

== Description ==
It is a small species of free-tailed bat, with a forearm length of 29–30 mm (1.1–1.2 in) and weighing 7–7.5 g (0.25–0.26 oz). It is sexually dimorphic, with males larger than the females. Its skull has a flattened appearance. Its dorsal fur is brown, while its ventral fur is white or gray. Both males and females have gular glands. Its dental formula is 1.1.2.32.1.2.3 for a total of 30 teeth.

== Biology and ecology ==
The Mato Grosso dog-faced bat possibly has a harem social structure. In Venezuela, colonies consist of a single male and two to four females. It is a seasonal breeder, with females giving birth once per year at the beginning of the wet season. It is insectivorous.

== Range and habitat ==
It is found in several countries in South America, including Brazil, Colombia, Guyana, and Venezuela.

== Conservation ==
As of 2008, it is evaluated as a least-concern species by the IUCN—its lowest conservation priority.
