= Museum of Zoology of the University of São Paulo =

Natural history museum in Ipiranga, São Paulo, Brazil

Coordinates: 23.5882°S 46.6101°W

- Museu de Zoologia da Universidade de São Paulo
- MZUSP logo featuring an anteater
- Established: 1890; 136 years ago
- Location: Avenida Nazaré, 481, Ipiranga, São Paulo, Brazil
- Type: Natural history
- Collection size: Insecta, Pisces, Amphibia, Reptilia, Aves, Mammalia, Mollusca, Crustacea, Arachnida and other Invertebrates
- Director: Marcelo Duarte da Silva
- Owner: Universidade de São Paulo
- Website: mz.usp.br

The Museum of Zoology of the University of São Paulo (Portuguese: Museu de Zoologia da Universidade de São Paulo, abbreviated MZUSP) is a public natural history museum located in the historic Ipiranga district of São Paulo, Brazil. The MZUSP is an educational and research institution that is part of the University of São Paulo. The museum began at the end of the 19th century as part of the Museu Paulista; in 1941, it moved into a dedicated building. In 1969 the museum became a part of the University of São Paulo, receiving its current name.

The MZUSP has one of the largest natural-history collections in Latin America, with over 8.5 million preserved specimens of vertebrates (amphibians, mammals, birds, fish and reptiles) and invertebrates (cnidarians, insects, crustaceans, arachnids, myriapods, annelids, mollusks and other marine groups). Each collection is curated independently, and organized according to specific needs. Other facilities in the museum include a library specializing in zoology and laboratories dedicated to research in chronobiology, electron microscopy, molecular biology, histology and CT scans. MZUSP also operates the Boracéia Biological Station in the forest near Salesópolis for field research.

== History ==
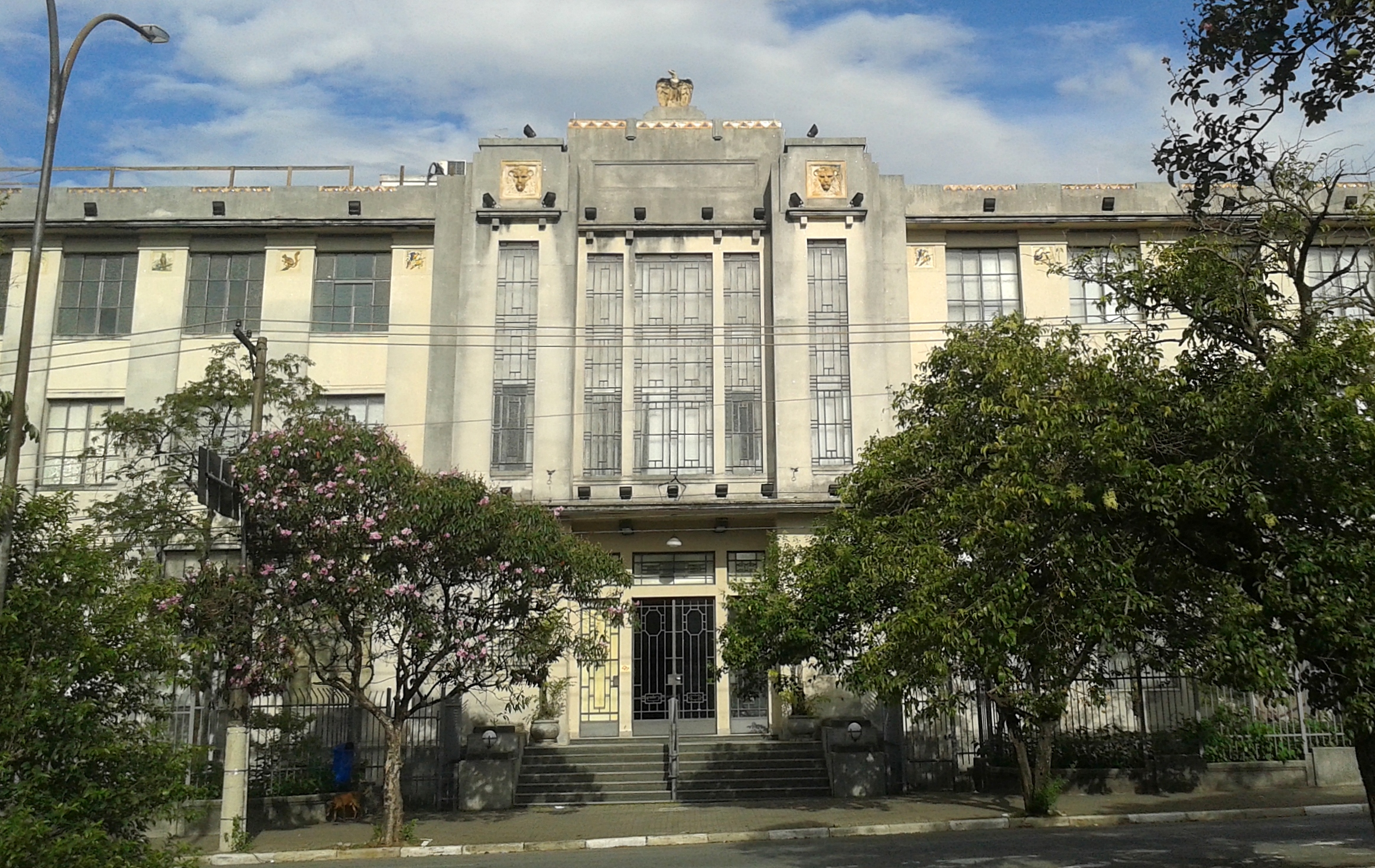
Main entrance of the 1941 building as of 2015

The Museum of Zoology began during the 1890s as an aggregation of several collections previously belonging to the Museu Paulista. In 1890 the Museu Paulista's director, Francisco Mayrink, donated to the São Paulo state government a natural history collection compiled during the 1870s. This collection was subsequently organized by the São Paulo state's Geographical and Geological Commission. In 1895 the collections were moved into the Museu Paulista's new building in the neighborhood of Ipiranga in São Paulo. During the next 40 years, new research was undertaken based on the growing zoological, botanical, ethnographic and historical collections housed in the Museu Paulista. By the 1930s, the Museum of Zoology was not yet an independent institution; it was still the Zoology Section of the Museu Paulista.

On 11 January 1939 the Secretariat of Agriculture, Industry and Commerce of São Paulo state established a Department of Zoology, replacing the Museu Paulista's Zoology Section. With the department's creation, a new building for the zoological collection was designed. Construction was completed in 1940–1941; the zoological collection was transferred to the new building, where it remains. In 1969 the museum became part of the University of São Paulo, and received its current name.

The Zoology Museum has one of the largest zoological collections in Latin America and plays a role in developing an understanding of biodiversity, local and worldwide. The museum was the first Brazilian institution recognized as a trustee by the Genetic Heritage Management Board of the Brazilian Ministry of the Environment.

== Collections ==
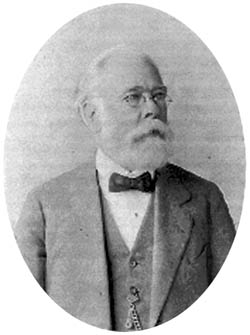
German-Brazilian zoologist Hermann von Ihering (1850–1930) led the effort to acquire and study many of MZUSP's earliest specimens.

The Museum of Zoology is home to several significant zoological collections. Each is curated independently and organized for each animal group. It is one of Latin America's largest biological collections, with nearly 8.5 million specimens. Several sub-collections are among the largest in the Americas and the world, with a large number of type specimens and specimens of species now extinct. The preparation of specimens intended for public exhibition is separate from that of research specimens.

=== Fish ===
In 2000, the ichthyological collection was considered one of the largest neotropical fish collections and one of the 10 largest overall worldwide. It contained nearly 1.3 million specimens, primarily preserved in ethanol. By 2013 it had 100,000 lots (each lot may contain several specimens) stored in bottles, barrels and plastic boxes, occupying an area of 700 square metres (7,500 sq ft). Most of the fish were collected in Brazil, and the number of freshwater specimens is seven times greater than saltwater specimens.

The collection began at the end of the 19th century, in common with the other MZUSP collections, and by 1940 it comprised 3,000 lots. During the 1960s several experts were hired; the collection expanded considerably due to research expeditions and prospecting off the southern coast of Brazil by the Oceanographic Institute of the University of São Paulo. With the establishment of graduate programs and Brazilian research, the collection continues to grow.

=== Reptiles and amphibians ===
In 2000 the museum's herpetological collection was considered the sixth-largest of its kind, and it is recognized as the largest assemblage of South American reptiles and amphibians. In 2013 it comprised 260,000 specimens (an increase of nearly 12 percent over 230,000 specimens 13 years earlier), including nearly 120,000 reptiles and 140,000 amphibians (primarily preserved in wet media). The collection also features a large number of tissue samples (about 6,850 items) and almost 1,000 skeletons, preserved dry.

The herpetological collection began as material from sporadic expeditions by the end of the 19th century, which was still housed in the Museu Paulista. Most specimens were identified by researchers during the early 20th century. In 1946, zoologist Paulo Emílio Vanzolini became the curator of herpetology. Vanzolini was primarily responsible for the collection's expansion from about 1,200 specimens to its current size. In March 2002, he was succeeded by zoologist Hussam El Dine Zaher.

=== Birds ===
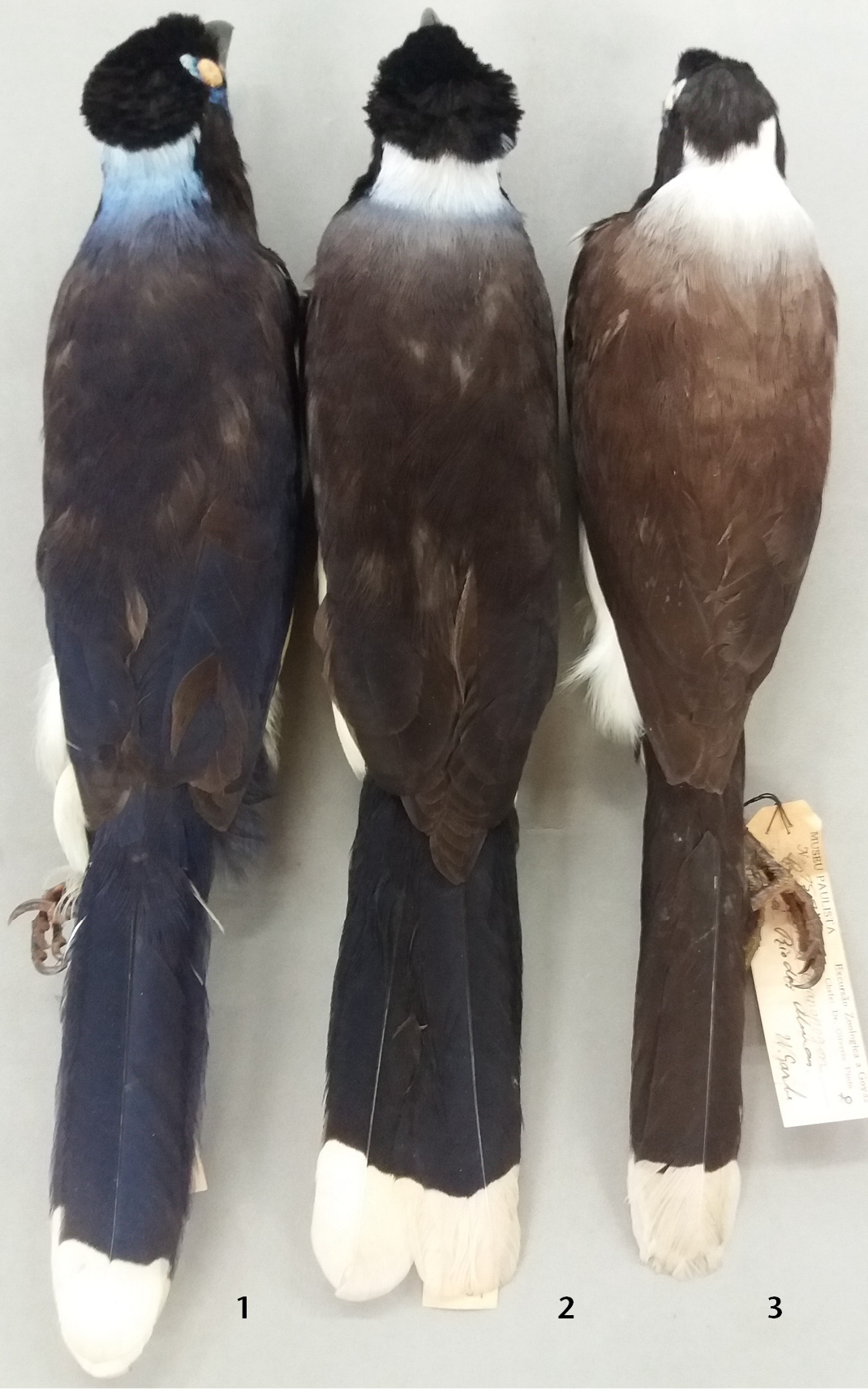
New World jays (Cyanocorax) from MZUSP's ornithological collection

The ornithological collection is the world's largest and most-complete assembly of Brazilian birds. In 2013 this collection included 85,000 taxidermized specimens of 150 types, kept in storage cabinets (a 12-percent increase over the 75,000 specimens the collection had 13 years earlier). The ornithological collection also contains tissue samples (about 4,000 items), 2,000 nests, 3,000 eggs, with over 2,000 specimens preserved in wet media. There are also recorded vocalizations from over 800 species.

The ornithology collection dates to the first collections in the Museu Paulista, with its first known specimens collected during the late 19th century. During this first phase, the collection was curated by zoologist Hermann von Ihering and expeditions were conducted which generated knowledge of the Brazilian avifauna's diversity. Traveling naturalists associated with the museum explored remote areas (including Juruá in 1902 and other regions of Brazil) and collected specimens. After Ihering's departure in 1916, field activity associated with the ornithological collection decreased. After 1929, under the curatorship of zoologist Olivério Pinto, activity increased; surveys were conducted in all biomes, in a number of locations. Benefiting from the activity of Ecuadorian collector A. Martins Olalla, the ornithology collection became the largest and most-complete Brazilian collection of its kind. Under Pinto's many scientific works were published, including Brazilian bird catalogs and the unfinished Ornithologia brasiliense.

Pinto was succeeded by Eurico Camargo and Helio Camargo, who continued the tradition of describing and documenting the diversity of Brazilian birds at MZUSP. After Camargo's 1981 retirement, the collection stagnated until sampling and cataloging activities were resumed in 2003. The ornithology collection is curated by zoologist Luis Fábio Silveira.

=== Mammals ===
In 2013, the mammal collection comprised 50,000 specimens (an increase of almost 80 percent over the 28,000 specimens recorded in 2000) collected in Brazilian territory, especially from the southeast and the Amazon rainforest. In 2000, the museum's mammal collection was considered the second-largest in the Americas. Its first known specimens were catalogued in 1895. In 1930 zoologist Carlos Octaviano da Cunha Vieira became the mammal collection's first curator, remaining in the position until his death in 1958. During his tenure Vieira expanded the collection from about 3,000 to more than 15,000 specimens, publishing catalogues and monographs on Brazilian mammals. Vieira was succeeded by zoologist Cory Carvalho, who was curator of the mammal collection from 1960 to 1961. After Carvalho's departure the collection did not have an exclusive curator until 1999, when zoologist Mario de Vivo assumed the position.

=== Crustaceans ===
In 2013 the crustacean collection comprised over 500,000 specimens (an increase of 2,381 percent over the 21,000 specimens catalogued in 2000), and was considered one of the largest in Latin America. It includes 600 type specimens. The marine lots primarily comprise species from the Western Atlantic (especially the region between French Guiana and Argentina), and includes extensive material of the order Decapoda from other oceanic basins (including the Indo-Pacific and Mediterranean Sea). The terrestrial and freshwater specimens are primarily from the Neotropics, including nearly all regions of Brazil. The collection began in 1894 (then at the Museu Paulista) with the work of Hermann von Ihering and his colleagues, including Ernest Garbe and Hermann von Lüderwaldt. In 1939 the collection was transferred to the Department of Zoology, where it remained until 1969 (when it was incorporated into the University of São Paulo). In 1961 the Department of Zoology hired Gustavo Augusto Schmidt de Melo, who has participated in a number of expeditions emphasizing the collection of decapod crustaceans in marine and continental waters. Since 2003, the collection has been curated by zoologist Marcos Domingos Siqueira Tavares.

=== Insects ===
In 2000 the insect collection was the largest collection at MZUSP, with over 4.8 million specimens preserved dry (pinned) or in ethanol. The collection is an aggregation of smaller collections focused on individual insect orders, such as Coleoptera (beetles), Diptera (true flies), Hemiptera (true bugs), Hymenoptera (sawflies, wasps, bees and ants), Isoptera (termites) and Lepidoptera (moths and butterflies). Each collection is curated independently.

Coleoptera

The Coleoptera collection is the second-largest insect collection at MZUSP, with nearly a million specimens from 257 families (106 of which occur in Brazil). The collection consists primarily of neotropical species (from Brazil), and includes nearly 1,300 primary types. Coleopteran larvae are kept in metallic cabinets as a distinct collection. All its 40,000 specimens were raised in the laboratory, including 18,000 adults, 19,000 larvae and 3,200 pupae from about 90 families. Most adult specimens are stored with the immature specimens (preserved in ethanol), but a small number are kept dry in separate cabinets. The collection consists primarily of species collected in Brazilian states such as Pará, Mato Grosso Federal District, Mato Grosso do Sul, Goiás, Minas Gerais, Rio de Janeiro, São Paulo, Paraná and Rio Grande do Sul.

Diptera

The Diptera collection is the largest insect collection at the MZUSP. It consists of 550,000 specimens preserved dry and more than 500,000 individuals preserved in ethanol, totalling over 1,050,000 specimens. It is considered the largest collection in Latin America and one of the most important in the world because of its large number of types. The Diptera collection began in the former Zoology Section of the Museu Paulista. During the 20th century, it was amassed and curated with the aid of several researchers: Messias Carrera and Maria Aparecida Vulcano d'Andretta during the 1940s, José Henrique Guimarães and Nelson Papavero during the 1960s, and Nelson Bernardi and Francisca do Val during the early 1970s.

Hymenoptera

The Hymenoptera collection comprises wasps, ants and bees from acquisitions and exchanges with other institutions and expeditions. The first catalogued specimens were collected by Hermann von Lüderwaldt and Hermann von Ihering during the early 20th century. The museum's bee collection was primarily acquired in São Paulo state, and is considered among the three largest collections of its kind in the country. The collection of aculeate wasps is notable for its representation of groups such as Chrysididae (cuckoo wasps), Mutillidae (ant-witches), Vespidae and, in particular, Pompilidae (spider wasps), Sphecidae (thread-waisted wasps) and Crabronidae. The Formicidae (ant) collection is considered the most representative of the neotropical region for its number of type specimens, species diversity and geographical coverage.

Isoptera

The Isoptera collection consists of nearly 18,000 specimens from all Brazilian biomes. It includes specimens of all known genera in the neotropical region, most of the palearctic and nearctic, Asia, Australia and Ethiopia.

Lepidoptera

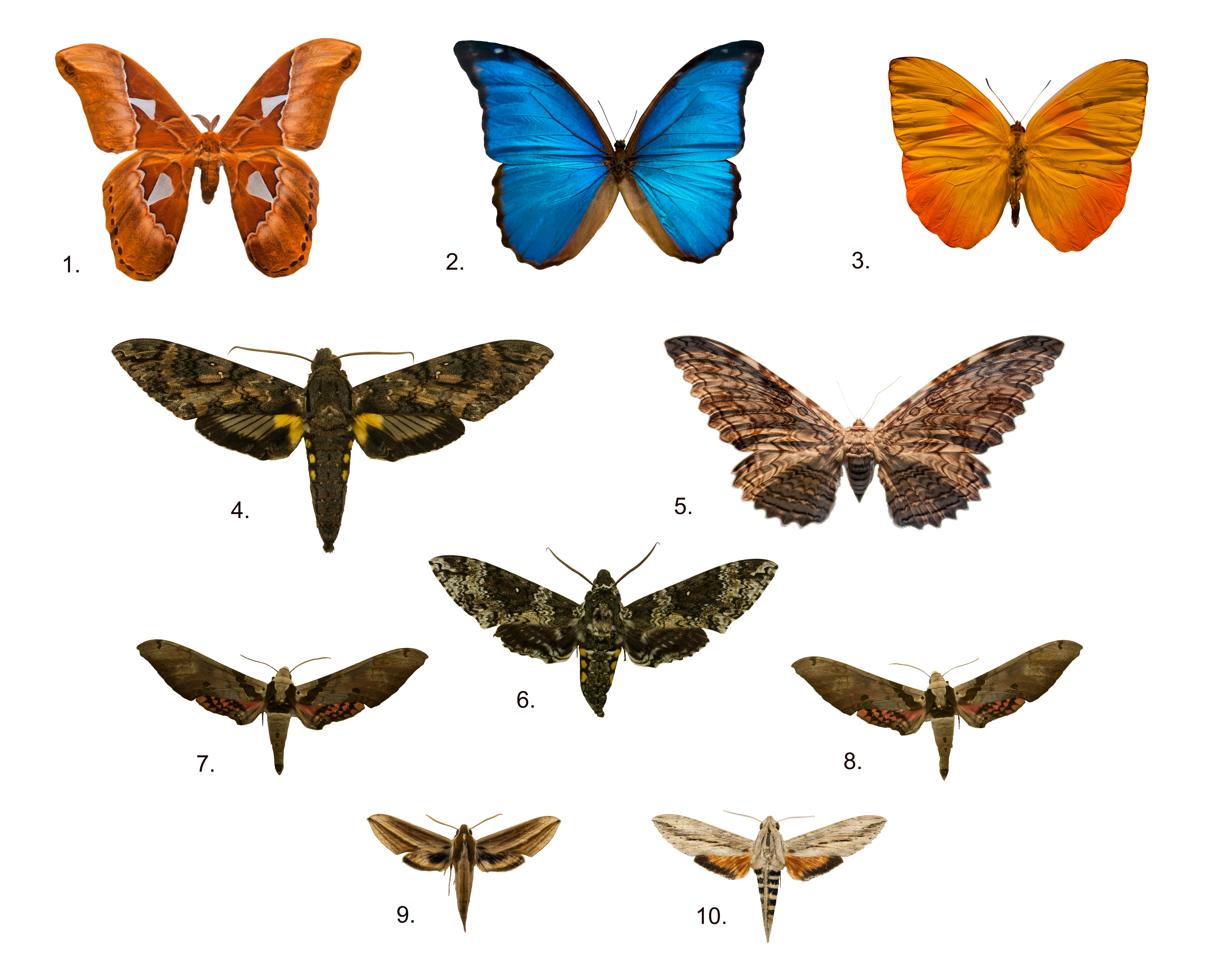
Brazilian butterfly collection

The Lepidoptera collection contains nearly 290,000 specimens of butterflies and moths, and is considered second-largest public collection in the country. The largest number of types are Lepidoptera collected in southeastern Brazil. The specimens, overall, are primarily from the neotropics. The collection began in the late 19th century (including material collected by Ernst Garbe, Hermann von Lüderwaldt and R. Spitz during the early 20th century), and was curated by zoologist Lauro Travassos from the 1940s to 1969. Since 2006, the collection has been curated by zoologist Marcelo Duarte da Silva.

=== Molluscs ===
The museum's malacological collection is probably the largest in Latin America; in 2000, there were nearly 40,000 catalogued lots. By 2013 the collection more than doubled, reaching over 100,000 lots and about 1,000,000 specimens preserved dry (mollusc shells) or in ethanol (whole animals with the shell and soft parts, or soft parts alone). The collection has over 1,000 type specimens: primary or secondary (paratypes and paralectotypes). It comprises specimens from many global regions, with an emphasis on the neotropics and western Atlantic coast. The collection's earliest specimens predate the Museu Paulista; nearly 2,000 specimens date to the 1880s, originating in Hermann von Ihering's collection which he brought to Brazil. Several researchers curated the collection during the 20th century, including Frederico Lange de Morretes (the 1930s), Eveline and Ernst Marcus (the 1950s) and José Luiz Moreira Leme (from the 1960s to the early 2000s). The collection is curated by zoologist Luiz Ricardo Lopes de Simone.

=== Arachnids ===
The arachnid collection is considered the third-largest in Brazil (the second-largest in the number of type-specimens), with nearly 32,000 lots (an increase of more than 56 percent over the 18,000 lots catalogued in 2000) primarily preserved in ethanol. Three-quarters of the lots are spiders and one-fifth are harvestmen from Brazil. There are nearly 600 primary type specimens, of which 60 percent are spiders and 28 percent are harvestmen. The collection began with specimens collected by researchers and travelling naturalists during the 19th and early 20th centuries. The collection is curated by zoologist Ricardo Pinto-da-Rocha.

=== Marine invertebrates ===
The marine invertebrate collection is composed of specimens from taxa other than crustaceans and molluscs. It includes Annelida, Brachiopoda, Bryozoa, Cestoda, Cephalochordata, Hemichordata, Cnidaria, Ctenophora, Echinodermata, Echiura, Entoprocta, Nematoda, Foraminifera, Phoronida, Rotifera, Turbellaria, Trematoda, Urochordata, Porifera, Priapulida and Sipuncula. Specimens are mostly marine (Western Atlantic and Antarctic Ocean), but some are neotropical freshwater and terrestrial. Containing nearly 200,000 lots and 200 type specimens, the collection was built with the efforts of late-19th-century researchers including Ernst and Eveline Marcus, Gilberto Righi, Luis Roberto Tommasi, Antonio Sérgio Ferreira Ditadi, Jeanete Maron Ramos, Gertrude Rita Kloss and Sérgio de Almeida Rodrigues.

=== Other collections ===
In 2000, the Acari (mites) collection of MZUSP was considered the second-largest in Brazil with 1,500 lots. The paleontological collection harbors fossils extracted from Brazilian sedimentary basins, including Bauru, São Francisco and Araripe. In 2000, the Myriapod (millipedes and centipedes) collection was considered the largest of its kind in Brazil with nearly 8,800 lots.

== Library and laboratories ==
In addition to its natural-history collections, the Museum of Zoology has a library and laboratories dedicated to chronobiology, electron microscopy, molecular biology, histology and CT-scans. Its library has one of the most complete zoological collections in South America: over 248,000 volumes (including books, theses and dissertations), scientific journals, specialized magazines, maps, and electronic information-storage media.

=== Chronobiology Laboratory ===
The Chronobiology Laboratory studies the biological rhythms of insects. It was established in 1987, when researcher-in-charge Mirian David Marques finished her internship in chronobiology at the University of Minnesota. Research methods used in the laboratory include automated (or visual) records of insect behavior. When rhythms are detected the neuroanatomy and neurophysiology of specimens are studied, searching for rhythm-generating centers using histology, histochemistry and molecular biology. Groups studied include springtails (Isotomidae), mosquitoes (Culicidae), crickets (Phalangopsinae), ants (Formicidae) and bees (Apidae).

=== Electron Microscopy Laboratory ===
The Electron Microscopy Laboratory has been in operation since 1998. A multi-user space, it meets the needs of researchers and students from MZUSP and other institutions. The laboratory has a scanning electron microscope, allowing detailed surface analysis of specimen structure. Samples for analysis are treated in-house to ensure preservation when subjected to an electron beam.

=== Molecular Biology Laboratory ===
In the basement of the MZUSP, the Laboratory of Molecular Biology assists researchers and students in research projects and aims to meet the teaching, research and extension demands of the MZUSP graduate program and associated programs.

== Boracéia Biological Station ==
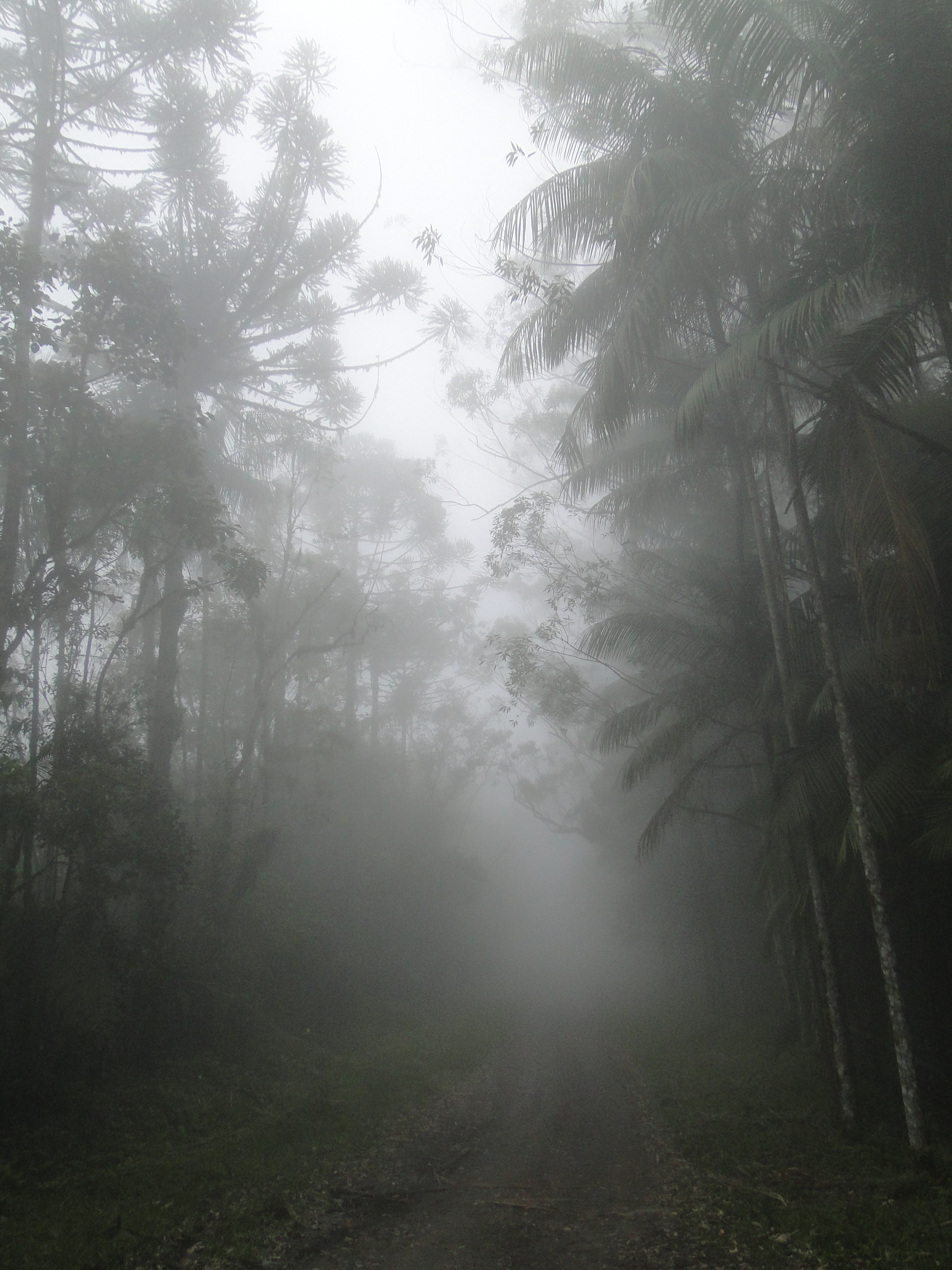
Atlantic Forest in Boracéia Biological Station

The Boracéia Biological Station was established by statute on 16 March 1954. It covers about 40 acres (96 ha) in a 6,800-acre (16,450-ha) primary forest reserve protecting a watershed about 110 kilometres (68 mi) from the city of São Paulo, in the municipality of Salesópolis. Because of its location in the Atlantic Forest, the area attracted the attention of zoologists and botanists before the station was created.

The station began in 1938 as an experimental station of the Agronomical Institute of Campinas. Zoological excursions to the area began in 1941, primarily by researchers from the former Department of Zoology. In 1952, the Agronomy Institute had finished its activities in the area; in 1954 the station was transferred to the Department of Zoology, becoming the Boracéia Biological Station for general research.

== Staff and student body ==
In 2016, the Museum of Zoology had a staff of 87, including 13 professors and researchers and 74 administrators and technicians. The student body consisted of 68 graduate students and 25 post-doctoral fellows.
