= Journal of Mammalogy =

Academic journal

- The journal's first volume, published November 1920
- Discipline: Mammalogy
- Language: English
- Edited by: Brett Riddle

Publication details
- History: 1919–present
- Publisher: Oxford University Press on behalf of the American Society of Mammalogists
- Frequency: Bimonthly
- Impact factor: 2.291 (2021)

Standard abbreviations
- ISO 4: J. Mammal.

Indexing
- CODEN: JOMAAL
- ISSN: 0022-2372 (print); 1545-1542 (web)
- LCCN: a42001146
- OCLC no.: 1015777873

Links
- Journal homepage; Online archive

The Journal of Mammalogy is a bimonthly peer-reviewed scientific journal published by Oxford University Press on behalf of the American Society of Mammalogists. Both the society and the journal were established in 1919. The journal covers research on mammals throughout the world, including their ecology, genetics, conservation, behavior, systematics, morphology, and physiology. The journal also publishes news about the society and advertises student scholarship opportunities.

The editor-in-chief of the journal has been Brett Riddle since 2021. Former editors-in-chief include Luis Ruedas and Barbara Hibbs Blake.

== Abstracting and indexing ==
The journal is abstracted and indexed in:

- Biological Abstracts
- BIOSIS Previews
- Current Contents/Agriculture, Biology & Environmental Sciences
- Essential Science Indicators
- GEOBASE
- Science Citation Index Expanded
- The Zoological Record

According to the Journal Citation Reports, the journal has a 2024 impact factor of 1.6.

== See also ==
- Mammalian Species, another publication of the American Society of Mammalogists
