= Mammalia (journal) =

- Discipline: Biology
- Language: English
- Edited by: Christiane Denys

Publication details
- History: 1937–present
- Publisher: De Gruyter
- Frequency: Bimonthly
- Impact factor: 0.714 (2017)

Standard abbreviations
- ISO 4: Mammalia

Indexing
- CODEN: MAMLAN
- ISSN: 0025-1461 (print); 1864-1547 (web)
- OCLC no.: 01449590

Links
- Journal homepage

Mammalia is a peer-reviewed scientific journal of biology focusing on mammals. It is published by the De Gruyter and is edited by Christiane Denys (Muséum National d'Histoire Naturelle).

== Abtrascting and indexing ==
The journal is abstracted and indexed in the following bibliographic databases:

- AGRICOLA
- BIOSIS Previews
- Biobase
- Biological Abstracts
- CABI
- CNKI Scholar
- CNPIEC
- Cabell's Directory
- Current Contents/Agriculture, Biology, and Environmental Sciences
- Dimensions
- EBSCO
- Engineering Village
- Gale/Cengage
- Genamics JournalSeek
- GeoRef
- GEOBASE
- J-Gate
- Japan Science and Technology Agency
- Journal Citation Reports/Science Edition
- JournalGuide
- JournalTOCs
- KESLI-NDSL
- Microsoft Academic
- Naviga
- Primo Central
- ProQuest
- Publons
- ReadCube
- Reaxys
- SCImago
- SCOPUS
- Science Citation Index Expanded
- Science Citation Index
- Sherpa/RoMEO
- Summon by ProQuest
- TDNet
- Ulrich's Periodicals Directory
- WanFang Data
- Web of Science
- Zoological Record

According to the Journal Citation Reports, the journal has a 2017 impact factor of 0.714.
