= Mammal Review =

- Cover of Volume 51, Issue 2 from April 2021
- Discipline: Conservation, biogeography
- Language: English
- Edited by: Danilo Russo, Nancy Jennings

Publication details
- Publisher: Wiley-Blackwell
- Impact factor: 5.373 (2021)

Standard abbreviations
- ISO 4: Mammal Rev.

Indexing
- ISSN: 1365-2907

Links
- Journal homepage; Online access; Online archive

Mammal Review is a zoology journal published by Wiley-Blackwell on behalf of The Mammal Society. Covering all areas of mammalian biology, ecology, physiology, behaviour, biogeography and conservation biology, the journal is edited by Dr Robyn Grant, with Dr Antonio Uzal Fernandez as Assistant Editor. The journal has a current impact factor of 5.373, which corresponds to a ranking of 32/174 (Ecology) and 5/177 (Zoology).
