= American Society of Mammalogists =

American nonprofit organization

The American Society of Mammalogists (ASM) was founded in 1919 to encourage the study of mammals. There are over 4,500 members, primarily professional scientists who emphasize the importance of public policy and education. There are several ASM meetings held each year, and the society manages several publications such as the Journal of Mammalogy, Special Publications, Mammalian Species, and Society Pamphlets. The best known of these is the Journal of Mammalogy. The ASM also maintains The Mammal Image Library which contains more than 1,300 mammal slides. A president, vice president, recording secretary, secretary-treasurer, and journal editor are all elected by the members to be officers of the society. In addition, ASM is composed of thirty one committees, including the Animal Care and Use Committee, the Conservation Awards Committee, the International Relations Committee, and the Publications Committee. It also provides numerous grants and awards for research and studies on mammals. These awards can go to both scientists and students. The ASM also lists employment opportunities for their members.

== History ==
Milo Herrick Spaulding was a charter member.

== Mammal Diversity Database ==
Since 2018, the American Society of Mammalogists has maintained the Mammal Diversity Database, an online checklist of mammal species. The database is maintained by the ASM Biodiversity Committee and "aims to provide a continuously updated listing of the world's mammal species and higher taxa." The latest update (version 2.2) was released on June 13, 2025, and lists 6,815 species placed in 1,359 genera, 167 families and 27 orders.

== Mammal Societies ==
A list of world mammalogical societies associated with or that publish in the ASM. By 2017, the ASM had 865 non-US members from 88 countries.

- Argentina: Sociedad Argentina para el Estudio de los Mamíferos (Argentine Society for the Study of Mammals, SAREM). Official journal: Mastozoología Neotropical (Journal of Neotropical Mammalogy).
- Australia: The Australian Mammal Society. Official journal: Australian Mammalogy.
- Bolivia: Red Boliviana de Mastozoología (RBM; formerly the Asociación Boliviana de Investigadores de Mamíferos, ABIMA) Official publication: None. Articles are published through the organization's Facebook page, the "Publicaciones" section on the RBM website, Revista Latinoamericana de Conservación (Latin American Journal of Conservation), PLoS One, Therya, Ecología en Bolivia (Ecology in Bolivia Journal of the Institute of Ecology), or the Journal of Mammalogy.
- Brazil: Sociedade Brasileira de Mastozoologia (Brazilian Society of Mastozoology, or Brazilian Society of Mammalogy, SMBz). Official publication[s]: Brazilian Journal of Mammalogy (BJM) and co-edits the Journal of Neotropical Mammalogy with SAREM.
- Colombia: Sociedad Colombiana de Mastozoología (Colombian Society of Mammalogy, SCMas). Official journal: Mammalogy Notes (Notas Mastozoológicas (MaNo)
- Ecuador: Mamíferos del Ecuador (Ecuadorian Association of Mammalogy). Affiliated with the Latin American Network of Mammalogy (RELAM) and the International Federation of Mammalogists (IFM). Official publication: Mammalia aequatorialis (The Ecuadorian Journal of Mammalogy)
- El Salvador: Grupo de Trabajo de Mastozoología de El Salvador (GTMES). Official publication: Unknown
- Europe: Societas Europaea Mammalogica (European Mammal Foundation, SEM), registered in the Netherlands. The IX European Congress of Mammalogy (ECM9), organized by the Hellenic Zoological Society, the European Mammal Foundation, and Mammal Conservation Europe convened in Patras, Greece from March 31 to April 4, 2025.
- France: Societe Francaise pour l'Etude et la protection des Mammiferes (The French Society for the Study and Protection of Mammals, SFEPM), supports and coordinates the National Mammal Observatory (ONM) The organization publishes the journal "Arvicola", the magazines Mammifères Sauvages (Wild Mammals) and L'Envol des Chiros.
- Germany: Deutsche Gesellschaft für Säugetierkunde (German Society for Mammalian Biology). Official publication: Mammalian Biology (Formerly Zeitschrift für Säugetierkunde).
- Guatemala: Asociación Guatemalteca de Mastozoología
- International Federation of Mammalogists:
- Italy: Associazione Teriologica Italiana (ATIt) within the Department of Biology and Biotechnology "Charles Darwin" University of Rome ("La Sapienza"). Official publication: Hystrix, the Italian Journal of Mammalogy.
- Japan: Mammalogical Society of Japan (MSJ). A joining of the Mammalogical Society of Japan, founded in 1949, and the Research Group of Mammalogists, founded in 1955. Official publication: The quarterly Mammal Study in English and the bi-annual Honyurui Kagaku (Mammalian Science), written in Japanese.
- Mexico: Asociación Mexicana de Mastozoología, A.C. (Mexican Association of Mammalogy, AMMAC). Official publication: Therya (English), Therya Notes (English and Spanish), and THERYA ixmana (Spanish) published quarterly.
- Panama: Sociedad Mastozoológica de Panamá (Mammalogical Society of Panama, SOMASPA).
- Paraguay: Associacion Paraguaya de Mastozoologia (Paraguayan Association of Mammalogy) Official publication: Mastozoología Neotropical (Journal of Neotropical Mammalogy) through SAREM (see Argentine above) and the Notas Sobre Mamiferos Sudamericanos (Notes on South American Mammals).
- People’s Republic of China: Mammalogical Society of China (MSC), an NGO, is part of the Zoological Society of China, It is also known as the Branch of Mammalogical Society of China Zoology Society, and falls under the Biological sciences. The China Primatological Society was formed from the Primatological Specialist Group (PSG) of the MSC. The Institute of Zoology (IOZ) is under the Chinese Academy of Sciences, which is the host and administrative entity of the MSC. The China Biodiversity Observation Network (China BON) includes the China Mammal Diversity Observation Network (China BON-Mammal), under the China Ministry of Ecology and Environment (MEE), works with the MSC. Official publication: Acta Theriologica Sinica.
- Peru: There are two mammalogy organizations. The Asociación de Mastozoólogos del Perú (Association of Mastozoologists of Peru, AMP). AMP has become more active than the Peruvian Society of Mammals (Sociedad Peruana de Mastozoología, SPM). The SPM is a member of the ASM, and held the Symposium Notas sobre el I Congreso Peruano de Mastozoología, in Cusco, Perú, and hosted the Third Congress of the Peruvian Society of Mammalogy in 2012.
- Russia: Russian Theriological Society of the Russian Academy of Sciences, formally the All-Russian Theriological Society. Official publication: Russian Journal of Theriology.
- Spain: Sociedad Española para la Conservación y Estudio de los Mamíferos (Spanish Society for the Conservation and Study of Mammals, SECEM). Official publication: Galemys, Spanish Journal of Mammalogy. The Iberian Peninsula includes Portugal and Spain as well as Andorra, and the territory of Gibraltar. A small part of France (French Cerdagne or Cerdagne française) shares the Pyrenean valley ecosystem. This includes the Ordesa y Monte Perdido National Park, Pyrénées National Park, and the Aigüestortes National Park (only 25 miles (40 km) away from France. In 1997, UNESCO designated the shared area as the Pyrenees-Monte Perdido World Heritage Site. There is a large diversity of fauna. The list, named "Review of the Red List of Mammals of Mainland Portugal and Contribution to the Assessment of their Conservation Status" (2019) covers mammals in mainland Portugal and the Azores and Madeira.
- Switzerland: Schweizerische Gesellschaft für Wildtierbiologie (Swiss Society for Wildlife Biology, SGW) Official publication: CH-WILDiNFO: The parent organization, the Swiss Zoological Society (SZS), co-publishes the Revue suisse de Zoologie.
- United Kingdom: The Mammal Society. Official journal: Mammal Review.
- Venezuela: Asociación Venezolana para el Estudio de los Mamíferos (Venezuelan Association for the Study of Mammals, AsoVEM). Official publication: None. Researchers publish in the ASM, Anartia (Univ Zulia Museo Biologia) and other peer-reviewed journals such as the Venezuelan science journal Memoria de la Fundación La Salle de Ciencias Naturales.
- Portugal: Sociedade Portuguesa de Etologia (Portuguese Society of Ethology, SPE). While lacking a specific mammalian organization, there is the Marine Environment Research Association (AIMM Portugal), Portuguese Primatological Association (APP), and the Red List of "Mammals in Portugal" Project that, in 2023, listed 16 new species. The University of Lisbon Red List of Vertebrates and the International Union for Conservation of Nature, as well as the Center for Environmental and Marine Sciences (CESAM), the Institute for Nature Conservation and Forests (ICNF), and organizations such as the cross-border (Spain and Portugal) LIFE LUPI LYNX (LIFE LUPILYNX) initiative, supported by Rewilding Portugal, and the European Union LIFE Programme. and Interreg Spain-Portugal (POCTEP) Research from Portuguese institutions is published in the Journal of Mammalogy as well as other international journals.
