= Mammalogy =

Study of mammals

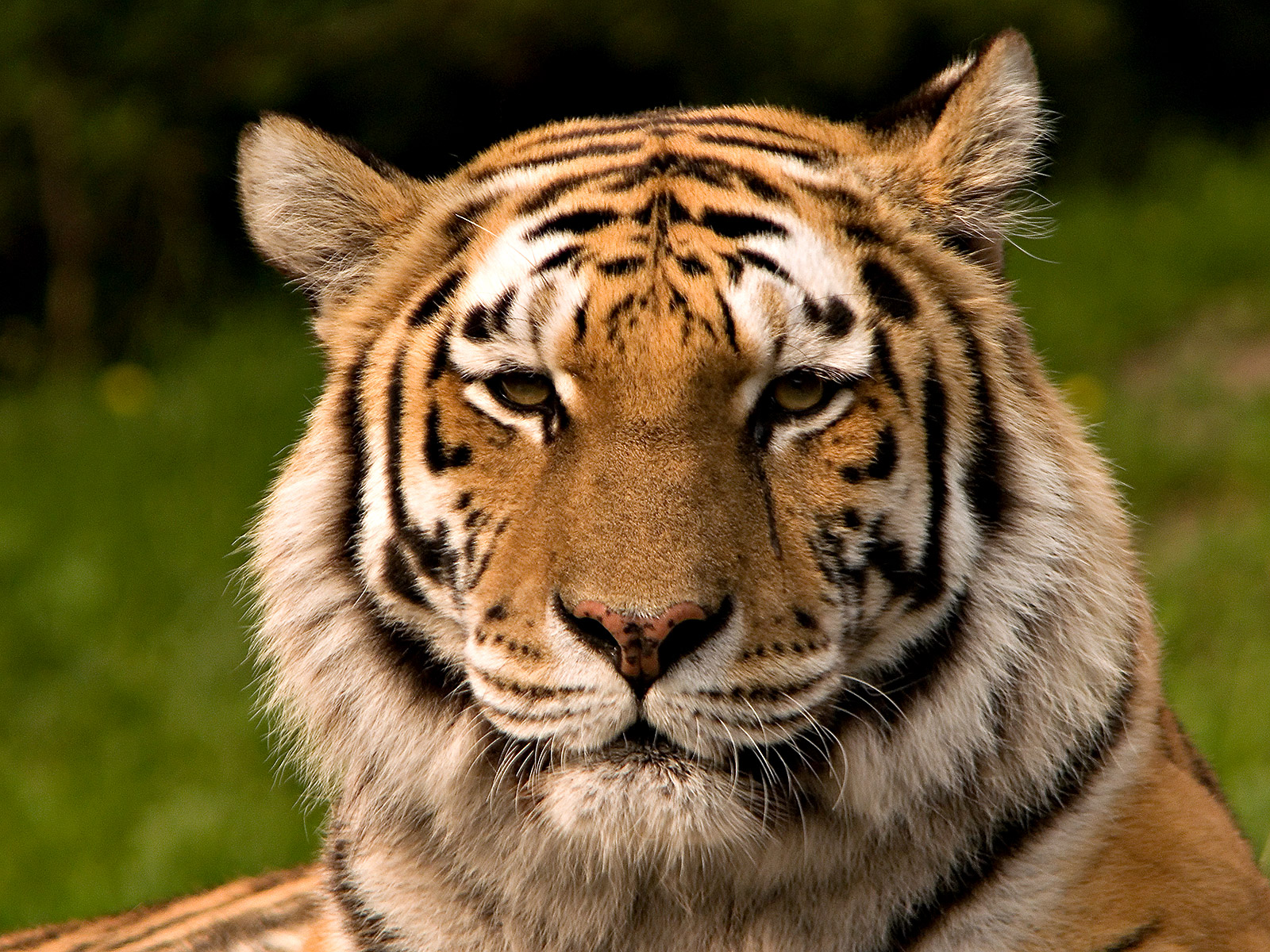
Siberian tiger

In zoology, mammalogy, from Latin mamma, meaning "breast", and -logy from λόγος (lógos), meaning "study", is the study of mammals – a class of vertebrates with characteristics such as homeothermic metabolism, fur, mammary glands, four-chambered hearts, and complex nervous systems. The archive of the number of mammals on earth is constantly growing, but is currently set at 6,495 different mammal species including recently extinct. There are 5,416 living mammal species identified on earth and roughly 1,251 have been newly discovered since 2006. The major branches of mammalogy include natural history, taxonomy and systematics, anatomy and physiology, ethology, ecology, and management and control. Mammalogists are typically involved in activities such as conducting research, managing personnel, and writing proposals.

Mammalogy branches off into other taxonomically oriented disciplines such as primatology (the study of primates), and cetology (the study of cetaceans). Like other studies, mammalogy is also a part of zoology which is also a part of biology, the study of all living things.

== Research purposes ==
Mammalogists have stated that there are multiple reasons for the study and observation of mammals. Knowing how mammals contribute to or thrive in their ecosystems gives knowledge on the ecology behind it. Mammals are often used in business industries, agriculture, and kept for pets. Studying mammals habitats and sources of energy has led to aiding in survival. The domestication of some small mammals has also helped discover several different diseases, viruses, and cures.

== Mammalogist ==
A mammalogist studies and observes mammals. In studying mammals, they can observe their habitats, contributions to the ecosystem, their interactions, and their anatomy and physiology. A mammalogist can do a broad variety of things within the realm of mammals. A mammalogist on average can make roughly $58,000 a year. This depends on the employer and the state.

== History ==
The first people recorded to have researched mammals were the ancient Greeks with records on mammals that were not even native to Greece and others that were. Aristotle was one of the first to recognize whales and dolphins as mammals since up until the 18th century most of the study was done by taxonomy.

Since then, there has been a continuation of studies through groups like the American Society of Mammalogists formed in 1919. These groups aided in bringing more structure to mammalogy by allowing more centralization of research. This was seen in ASM with the number of members increasing significantly in the first decade after its formation.

== Journals ==
This is a list of scientific journals broadly serving mammalogists. In addition, many other more general zoology, ecology and evolution, or conservation journals also deal with mammals, and several journals are specific to only certain taxonomic groups of mammals.

Select list of mammalogy journals
Journal	Organization	Publication schedule	Impact factor	First issue	Open access	Page charges	Online ISSN	Print ISSN	Former name
Journal of Mammalogy	American Society of Mammalogists	Bimonthly	2.308	1919	Option	Yes	1545-1542	0022-2372	none
Mammal Review	The Mammal Society	Quarterly	3.919	1970	Option	No	1365-2907	–	none
Mammalian Biology	German Society for Mammalian Biology	Bimonthly	1.337	1935	Option	No	1616-5047	–	Zeitschrift für Säugetierkunde
Mammalia	–	Quarterly	0.824	1936	Option	No	1864-1547	–	none
Mammal Research	Polish Academy of Sciences	Quarterly	1.161	1954	Option	No	2199-241X	2199-2401	Acta Theriologica
Mammal Study	Mammal Society of Japan	Quarterly	0.426	1959	No	No	1348-6160	1343-4152	Journal of the Mammalogical Society of Japan
Hystrix, the Italian Journal of Mammalogy	Italian Theriological Association	Quarterly	0.593	1986	Yes	No	1825-5272	–	none
Galemys, Iberian Journal of Mammalogy	Spanish Society of Mammalogists	Annually	–	1988	Yes	No	2254-8408	–	none
Lutra	Dutch Mammal Society	Biannually	–	1957	Yes	No	–	–	none
Australian Mammalogy	Australian Mammal Society	Biannually	–	1972	No	No	1836-7402	0310-0049	none
Acta Theriologica Sinica	Mammalogical Society of China	Quarterly	–	1981	Yes	No	1000-1050	–	none
Brazilian Journal of Mammalogy	Brazilian Society of Mammalogists	Annually	–	1985	Yes	No	2764-0590	–	Boletim da Sociedade Brasileira de Mastozoologia
Theriologia Ukrainica	Ukrainian Theriological Society	Biannually	–	1998	Yes	No	2617-1120	2616-7379	Proceedings of the Theriological School

== See also ==
- List of mammalogists
- Rodentology
