= Manchurian hare =

Species of mammal

Chinese name
- Simplified Chinese: 东北兔
- Traditional Chinese: 東北兔
Transcriptions
Standard Mandarin
- Hanyu Pinyin: Dōngběi tù
- IPA: [tʊ́ŋ.pèɪ tʰû]

Korean name
- Hangul: 만주토끼
Transcriptions
- Revised Romanization: Manju tokki

Manchurian hare
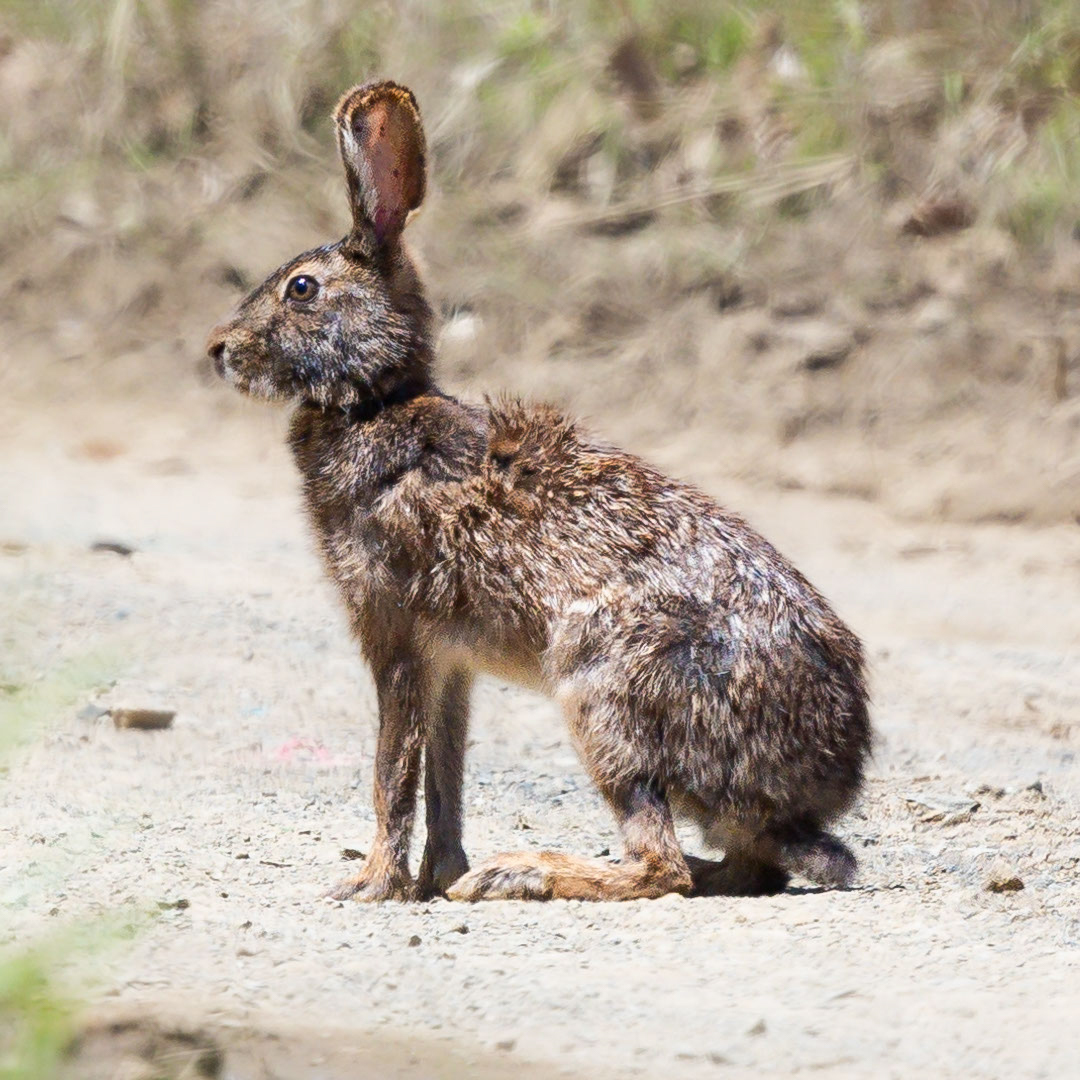
- Lepus mandshuricus in Khasansky District, Russia

Conservation status
- Least Concern (IUCN 3.1)

Scientific classification
- Kingdom: Animalia
- Phylum: Chordata
- Class: Mammalia
- Infraclass: Placentalia
- Order: Lagomorpha
- Family: Leporidae
- Genus: Lepus
- Species: L. mandshuricus

Binomial name
- Lepus mandshuricus Radde, 1861
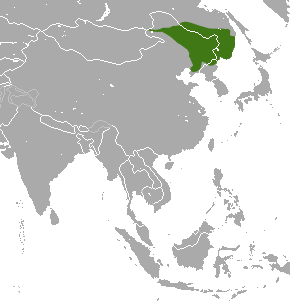
- Manchurian hare range

Synonyms
- Lepus mandjuricus Przhevalsky, 1870; Lepus melanonotus Ognev, 1922; Allolagus mandshuricus Ognev, 1929; Caprolagus mandshuricus Zolotarev, 1936; Lepus melainus Li and Luo, 1979

The Manchurian hare (Lepus mandshuricus) is a species of mammal in the family Leporidae found in northeastern China and Russia, the Amur River basin, and possibly the mountains of northern North Korea. In contrast to other hares, it lives in forests and takes to closed shelters to rest and escape predators. It is similar in appearance to and was once considered a subspecies of the Japanese hare, but its closest genetic relatives are the Korean and Cape hares.

The species is threatened by habitat loss due to deforestation. In regions where forest is cleared away, the Manchurian hare is faced with competition from the Tolai hare. It occurs across several protected areas, and in some places has a very high population density. The International Union for the Conservation of Nature (IUCN) has assessed its conservation status as being of "least concern".

== Taxonomy and etymology ==
The Manchurian hare, scientific name Lepus mandshuricus, was first described by Gustav Radde in 1861, with a type locality of the Bureya Mountains in Khabarovsk Krai, Russia. The species name mandshuricus is Latin, meaning "of Manchuria". Radde noted that the species could possibly represent the adult form of the Japanese hare (L. brachyurus), and that all of the then-known Japanese hare specimens were young, but ultimately stated that L. mandshuricus should be considered a separate species until further research could be carried out. Sergey Ognev reclassified the species as belonging to the new genus Allolagus in 1929; it was in 1951 considered a subspecies of the Japanese hare based on dental characteristics and skull measurements, but this was refuted by phylogenetic analysis, which placed it in Lepus. The Manchurian hare has no subspecies of its own. Common names for the Manchurian hare in other languages include Dongbei tu (Chinese), Manzhurskiy zayats (Russian) and Manjutokki (Korean). Ognev noted it was called the tolo, taula, or tolau by the Evenki people, borto-gormako by the Nanai people, and borta-gurmakhung in Manchuria.

Melanistic forms of the Manchurian hare were known from at least 1870, as they were recorded in Ussuriland by Nikolay Przhevalsky. This form was variously described by naturalists throughout the 20th century, with Vladimir Arsenyev noting the form as an undescribed species within Caprolagus in 1921 and Ognev describing it as the subspecies Lepus mandshuricus melanonotus in 1922. Ognev later noted that it was recorded more frequently in southern Manchuria than elsewhere, and compared it to a black-backed form of the European hamster that appeared to be geographically restricted. The melanistic form was described as a distinct species, the Manchurian black hare (Lepus melanius), in 1979 by Li Zhengying and Lo Zexun. Because the species distribution of the melanistic population overlapped with that of not only the Manchurian hare, but also the mountain (L. timidus) and tolai hares (L. tolai), it was considered by Robert S. Hoffmann to be a synonym of L. mandshuricus in the third edition of Mammal Species of the World. This was supported by molecular genetic analysis done by Wu et al. that same year. Later works describe L. melanius as a junior synonym of L. mandshuricus.

=== Phylogeny ===
According to mitochondrial and nuclear gene analysis by Iraçabal et al., its closest genetic relatives are the Korean hare (L. coreanus) and the Cape hare (L. capensis), though it has been noted that there is very little mitochondrial DNA specific only to L. mandshuricus. This analysis also placed the most recent appearance of the species in the late Pleistocene epoch; earlier research describes it as emerging from 0.7 to 2.05 million years ago.

The following is a cladogram showing the relationships between the Manchurian hare and other hares (excluding L. starcki due to lack of information) based on a phylogenetic tree from Iraçabal et al., 2024:

- - - - - - - - - - - Lepus castroviejoi
                    - Lepus corsicanus
                  - Lepus arcticus
                - Lepus othus
              - - Lepus timidus
                - Lepus townsendii
            - - - Lepus mandshuricus
                - Lepus coreanus
              - Lepus capensis
          - Lepus tolai
        - - Lepus yarkandensis
          - Lepus tibetanus
      - - - - - Lepus europaeus
              - Lepus habessinicus
            - Lepus granatensis
          - - - Lepus hainanus
              - Lepus peguensis
            - Lepus nigricollis
        - - Lepus comus
          - Lepus oiostolus
    - - - - - - Lepus californicus
              - Lepus alleni
            - - Lepus callotis
              - Lepus flavigularis
          - Lepus americanus
        - - - Lepus schlumbergeri
            - Lepus microtis
          - Lepus saxatilis
      - Lepus brachyurus
  - Lepus sinensis
- Rabbits

== Characteristics ==
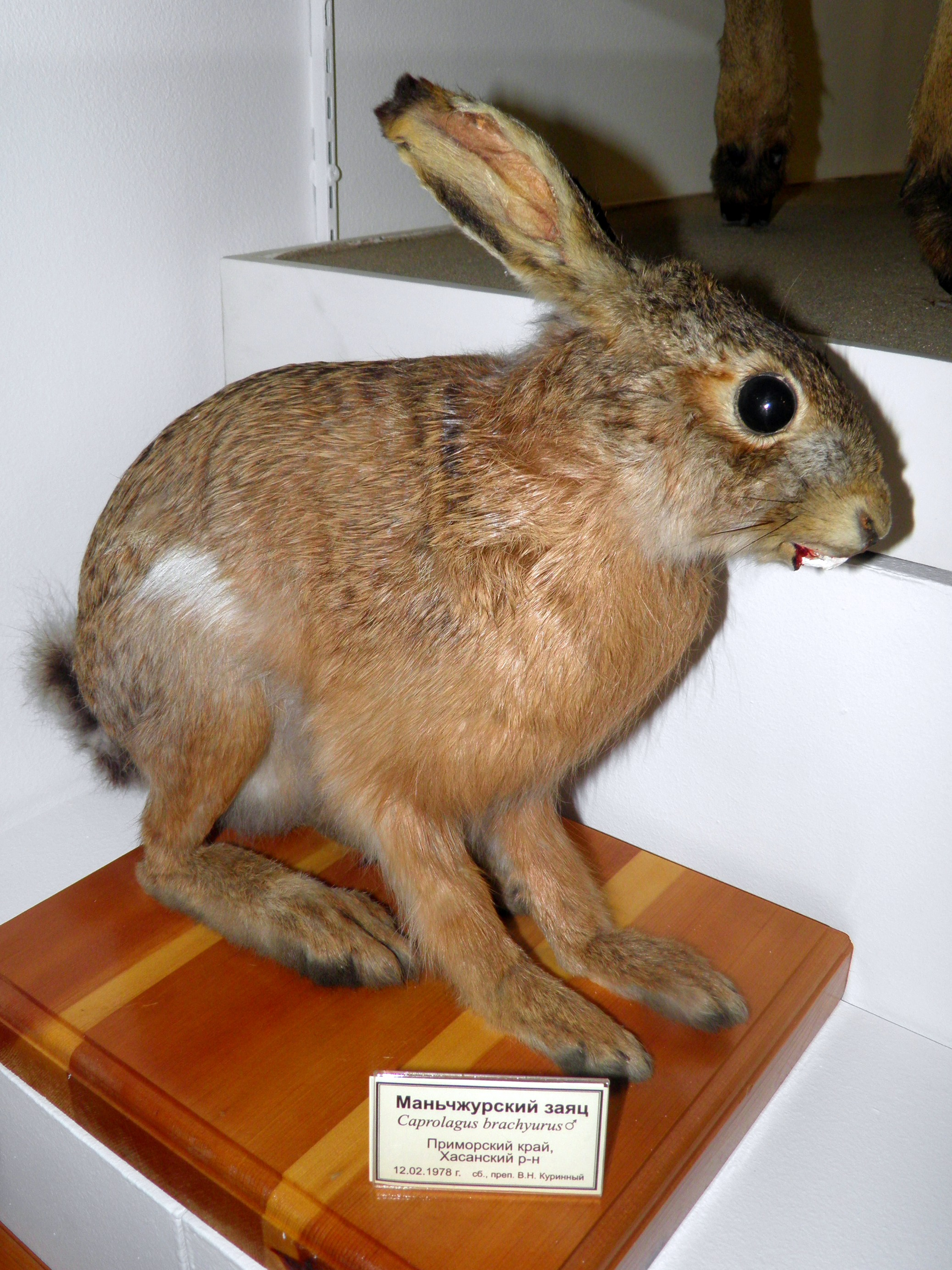
Taxidermied specimen, Far Eastern Federal University

The adult Manchurian hare weighs from 1.4 to 2.6 kilograms (3.1 to 5.7 lb) and has a body length of 41 to 54 centimetres (16 to 21 in), in addition to a tail of 5 to 8 centimetres (2.0 to 3.1 in). The ears are typically 7.5 to 11.8 centimetres (3.0 to 4.6 in) in length. Compared to the Korean hare, its hind legs are relatively short and its ears are relatively small. The melanistic morph, previously described as the separate species Lepus melainus, has shiny black fur and brown along the back and on its flanks. Typically, the fur of the Manchurian hare is soft and an ocher brown or gray from the head to the top of the tail. Its sides transition from a light yellow at the neck to a dirty white color on its lower portions. The belly is white, and the underside of the tail is more gray. The throat and chest appear light brown to buff. The head has some markings, with a dark band of fur visible below the eye, a white spot on the forehead, and lighter fur with white spots along the sides towards the jaw. The species appears similar to the Japanese hare. In the winter, the fur becomes grayer than it is in the summer. The guard hairs are soft, and are more robust than those of the desert hare (L. tibetanus).

Compared to other hares, its skull is narrow. There are slight bulges in the skull, and the bone structure above the eyes is short and narrow. The cheekbones are wide and large, and the bridge of the palate is broad. The auditory bullae (bone structures that enclose the middle and inner ear) are compressed laterally. These parts of the skull, in addition to several dental features, have been noted as characteristic of the species.

== Distribution and habitat ==
The Manchurian hare is native to eastern Russia and northeastern China. Its range extends eastwards from the Ussuri River region of Russia, through the Chinese provinces of Heilongjiang, Jilin, Liaoning and Inner Mongolia and possibly extends as far as North Korea, where its range may overlap with that of the Korean hare (Lepus coreanus). It is found in forests and has a preference for mixed woodlands over coniferous forest. It tends to avoid open areas and keeps away from human settlements. It occurs at altitudes of up to 900 m (2,953 ft). Its preferred woodlands are those areas with Manchurian hazelnut (genus Corylus) and Mongolian oak trees. The species' predilection for forest habitat is unusual among hares, which usually prefer open areas with some cover for rest and protection from predators.

== Behavior and ecology ==
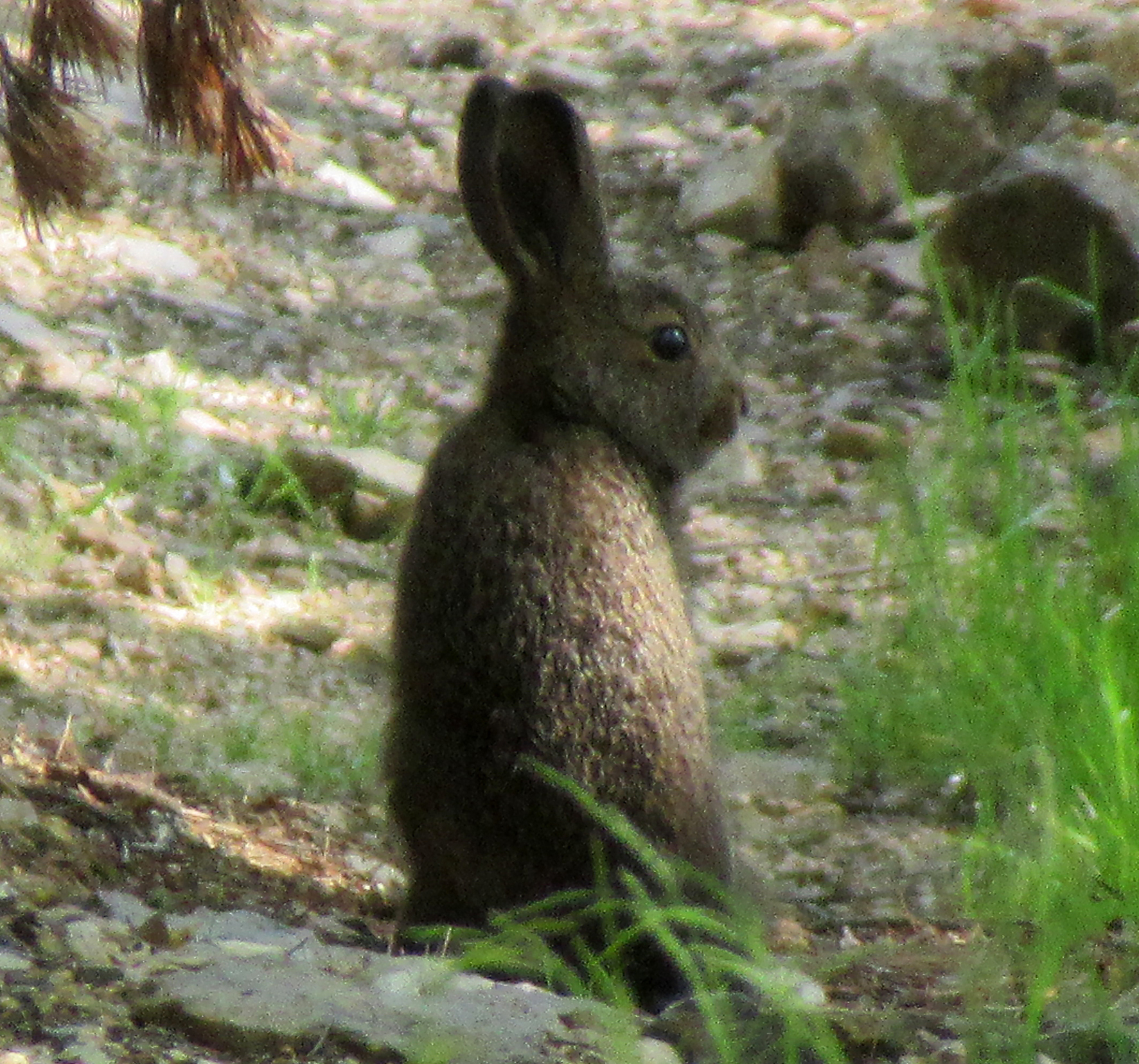
A Manchurian hare in Zov Tigra National Park

Lepus mandshuricus is a nocturnal hare that displays some activity at dawn. It prefers to rest in closed shelters rather than open burrows or forms (shallow depressions in the ground), such as hollow tree trunks. It escapes by running straight, similar to the Tolai hare. However, it is reluctant to leave shelter when in danger. When scared, it emits a sneeze-like vocalization.

Much of the Manchurian hare's ecology is assumed to be similar to that of the snowshoe hare (L. americanus). Its diet includes shrubs, herbs, and fallen fruits, as well as twigs and bark from willow, birch, elm, maple, apple, and linden trees. It likely lives a solitary lifestyle outside of breeding. In regions where the Manchurian hare population is particularly dense, its foraging behavior affects the composition and diversity of vegetation. It is parasitized by helminths, mites, cestodes, nematodes, and ticks. In winter, it is the primary host of Hyaemaphysalis japonica (a tick in family Ixodidae).

=== Reproduction ===
The Manchurian hare produces two to three litters annually and has 48 diploid chromosomes. The breeding season spans a five-month period starting in March or April and results in a litter of one or two young, though litter sizes as large as six have been observed. The average litter size is 2.4 young per litter.

== Relationship with humans ==
The Manchurian hare is the target of subsistence hunting. German naturalist Gustav Radde described its meat as "very savory". It is harvested commercially in Korea to a "very minor" degree, though its fur is not desirable, as the skin tears easily. It is subject to habitat destruction due to the clearing of forests within its distribution. By 2019, commercial exploitation had likely ceased.

=== Conservation ===
The Manchurian hare has a wide range and is present in a number of nature reserves, all of which are within China. It is threatened by the degradation of its forest habitat and the consequent spread of the Tolai hare, which replaces it in these cleared areas. Its present population size and population trend are unknown, but densities may be as high as 55 individuals per 100 hectares (250 acres). The International Union for Conservation of Nature has assessed its conservation status as being of least concern; this same status is given in a regional assessment of the species in China.
