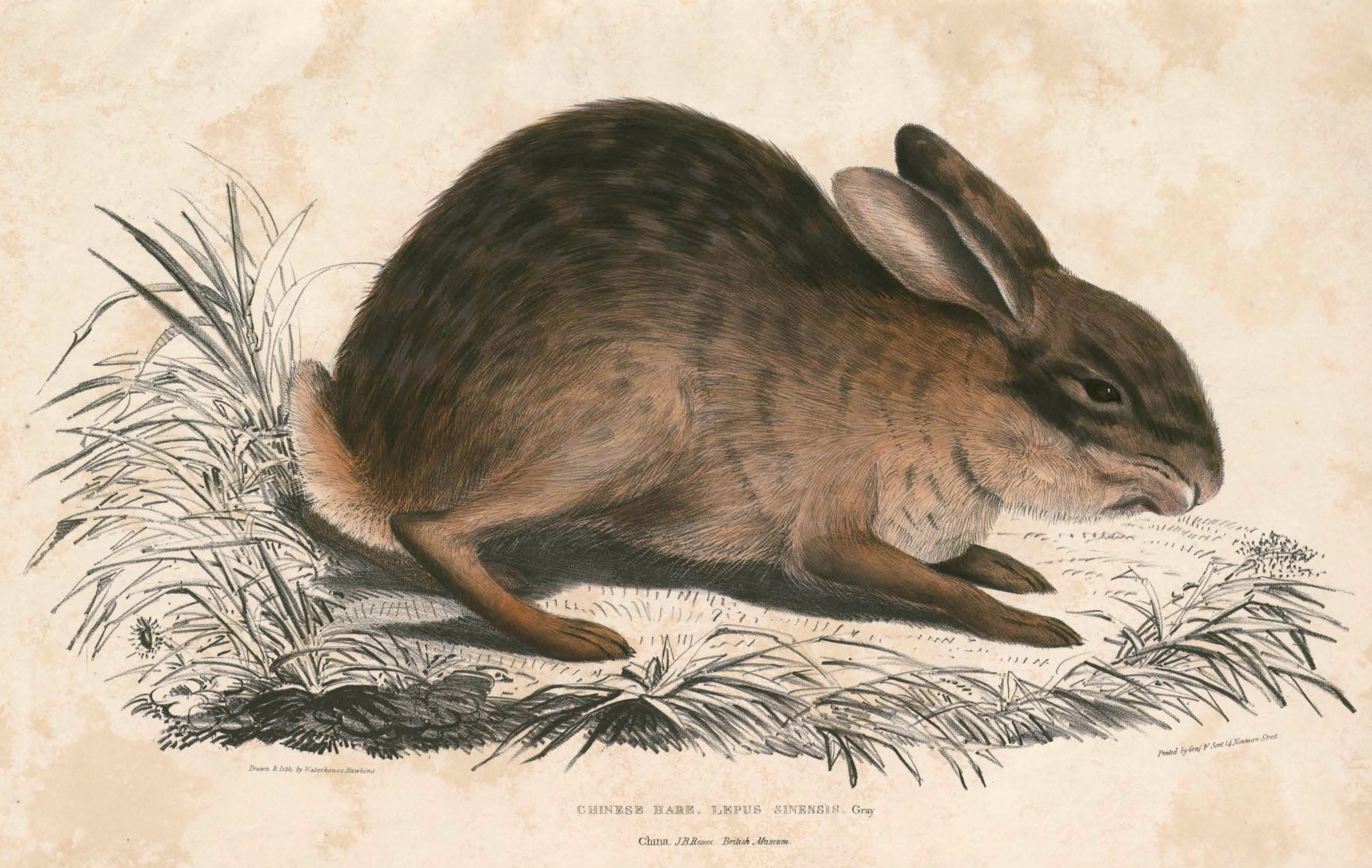
- 19th-century illustration by Thomas Hardwicke

Conservation status
- Least Concern (IUCN 3.1)

Scientific classification
- Kingdom: Animalia
- Phylum: Chordata
- Class: Mammalia
- Order: Lagomorpha
- Family: Leporidae
- Genus: Lepus
- Species: L. sinensis

Binomial name
- Lepus sinensis J. E. Gray, 1832
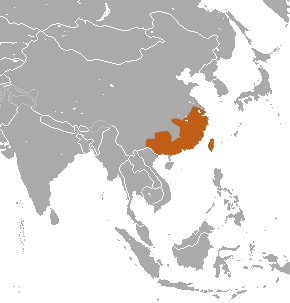
- Chinese hare range

Synonyms
- List: Lepus formosus O. Thomas, 1908; Caprolagus sinensis G. M. Allen, 1927; Caprolagus sinensis sinensis G. M. Allen, 1927; Caprolagus sinensis flaviventris G. M. Allen, 1927; Lepus yuenshanensis Shih, 1930

= Chinese hare =

Species of mammal

The Chinese hare (Lepus sinensis) (Chinese: 华南兔; pinyin: huá nán tù) is a coarse-furred species of hare found in southeastern China, Taiwan, and Vietnam. It is a small hare compared to others found in and around China, and can be identified by its brown back, chest, and tail fur, white underbelly, and black-tipped ears. Its fur is not as coarse as that of the hispid hare, though the two species were once thought to be related. The Chinese hare lives among bamboo and hilly grasslands vegetated with scrub, where it feeds on green plants, twigs, and shoots.

As the Chinese hare is a poorly studied species, little is known about specific populations. Studies have only defined very small populations living in Vietnam, where it is potentially threatened by hunting and habitat loss, and no sightings have been reported in the country since the 1990s. Elsewhere, the hare can be found in a number of protected areas, and it is considered a least-concern species by the International Union for Conservation of Nature and the China Species Red List.

== Taxonomy and etymology ==
The Chinese hare was first described by John Edward Gray in 1832, where it appeared in the 12th part of the 2nd volume of the work Illustrations of Indian Zoology. The publication included only an illustration alongside the text "Chinese hare. Lepus sinensis. Gray" and "China. J.B. Reeves, British Museum". Nearly 100 years later, in 1927, American zoologist Glover Morrill Allen transferred the species to the genus Caprolagus, as he considered the Chinese hare to be so different from other hares that it was closer to the hispid hare of Nepal. He called it "the common rabbit of South China", noted its short ears and harsh fur, and clarified its type locality as being in the region of Canton (as Gray had been exceedingly vague in his specification that the hare was found in "China"). He also provided a description of the subspecies Caprolagus sinensis flaviventris, which could be found in the mountains of Fujian.

Allen provided a more detailed description of the Chinese hare in the 1938 work The Mammals of China and Mongolia, and offered the common names of "harsh-furred hare" and "Chinese rabbit" for the species; he noted there that a species previously described by researcher Chausu McAmicus Shih in 1930, Lepus yuenshanensis, actually pertained to the Chinese hare subspecies C. s. flaviventris. Shih's definition was used for the subspecies L. s. yuenshanensis, which was separated out from the others in 2005 in the third edition of Mammal Species of the World. By 1947, mammalogist George Henry Hamilton Tate had returned the Chinese hare to the binomial name Lepus sinensis in the book Mammals of Eastern Asia. Several years earlier, in 1908, Oldfield Thomas described a species of hare native to the island of Taiwan (then known as Formosa) that resembled the Chinese hare, but had paler fur: Lepus formosus, the Formosan hare. However, by 1951, this species had been relegated to a subspecies of the Chinese hare. As of 2018, two subspecies of the Chinese hare were recognized:

- Lepus sinensis sinensis, the nominate subspecies found across mainland China and Vietnam; and
- Lepus sinensis formosus, the Formosan hare found on Taiwan.

A subspecies endemic to Hunan, L. s. yuenshanensis, has been documented since at least 1930, but is no longer recognized.

=== Phylogeny ===
The Chinese hare's genetic relationships with other hares is uncertain. Molecular studies of DNA found in hair and tissue samples found that the species' closest relatives were the Tolai hare (Lepus tolai), the mountain hare (L. timidus), the Cape hare (L. capensis), and the Korean hare. However, a study of the entire Lagomorpha family in 2024 found that the Chinese hare was one of the earliest species to diverge from the rest of the hares, and placed it as sister to the rest of the hare species (albeit with low support). According to the same study, the Chinese hare species diverged from other hares at the start of the Zanclean age, just after the end of the Miocene epoch, or roughly 5 million years ago. Below is a cladogram showing the Chinese hare's relationships with other lagomorphs, with its next closest relative being the Japanese hare (Lepus brachyurus):

- Lagomorpha
  - - Lepus sinensis
    - - Lepus brachyurus
      - - Other hares
  - Rabbits and pikas

The Korean hare (Lepus coreanus) was at one time considered to be a subspecies of the Chinese hare; it was first described as such by Oldfield Thomas in 1892, where he noted that it could be determined to be a distinct species based on seasonal variations in its fur color compared to L. sinensis. It remained a subspecies in Ellerman and Morrison-Scott's 1951 Checklist of Palearctic and Indian Mammals. Molecular studies of mtDNA have since shown that the Korean hare is in fact a separate species.

Regarding the Chinese hare's fossil history, only a few fossil records have been assigned to the species. Two broken skulls and several postcranial bones from Zhoukoudian Peking Man Site were tentatively assigned to L. sinensis in 2010.

== Description ==
The Chinese hare is small, compared to other hares found in China. It grows to an adult head and body length of 35 to 45 centimetres (14 to 18 inches) and a weight of 1.03 to 1.94 kilograms (2.3 to 4.3 pounds). Adults have been found with tails measuring from 4 to 5.7 cm (1.6 to 2.2 in) long, hind feet 8.1 to 11.1 cm (3.2 to 4.4 in) long, and ears from 6 to 8.2 cm (2.4 to 3.2 in) long. The fur is short and coarse, the back and chest being chestnut-brown and the belly whitish. The large hind feet are furred, the tail is brown and the tips of the ears bear triangular black patches. The fur is not as coarse as that of the hispid hare (Caprolagus hispidus), but is still notably stiff.

It is distinguished from other hare species by the shape and details of its skull and teeth. Specifically, it has elongated nasal bones, and smaller auditory bullae (the bones that surround the ear canals). It has indistict grooves on the forward (anterior) face of its upper incisors that are not filled with cementum. Another unique skeletal feature of the Chinese hare is its relatively small brow ridge, which lacks the notch going to the back of the skull that is usually observed in hares. Like other hares and rabbits, it has a dental formula of 2.0.3.31.0.2.3 × 2 = 28, indicating that it has two pairs of upper and one pair of lower incisors, no canines, three upper and two lower premolars on each side, and three upper and lower molars on either side of the jaw.

== Distribution and habitat ==
A Formosan hare in Taiwan

The Chinese hare is native to the Chinese provinces of Anhui, Fujian, Guangdong, Guangxi, Guizhou, Hunan, Jiangsu, Jiangxi and Zhejiang. It also occurs on Taiwan, mostly in the south, and in a small area of north-eastern Vietnam. The hare is found at elevations from sea level up to 5,000 metres (16,000 feet); higher elevation habitats above 4,000 m (13,000 ft) are typically forested with bamboo. Most Chinese hares inhabit hilly grasslands populated with scrub. They have also been found in rice fields.

== Diet and ecology ==
The Chinese hare's diet consists of leafy plants, twigs, and green plant shoots. A study in Taohongling Nature Reserve in Jiujiang, China found that the hare's preferred plant species included Rubus chingii, Smilax china, and Rhus chinensis, though its diet is considerably varied. Conspecific animals like the Sika deer and Reeves's muntjac were found to have less varied diets in the same study.

The Chinese hare has a breeding season that begins in April and ends in August. It is mainly nocturnal. Typically, three young are produced in each litter. This hare may opportunistically use burrows of other animals and pile fecal pellets outside the entrance.

Various carnivores prey on the Chinese hare and it relies on its fast running speed to escape from predators. The species is known to be susceptible to pneumonia caused by Klebsiella pneumoniae. Some specimens have been found infected by the flatworm species Taenia serialis.

== Conservation status ==
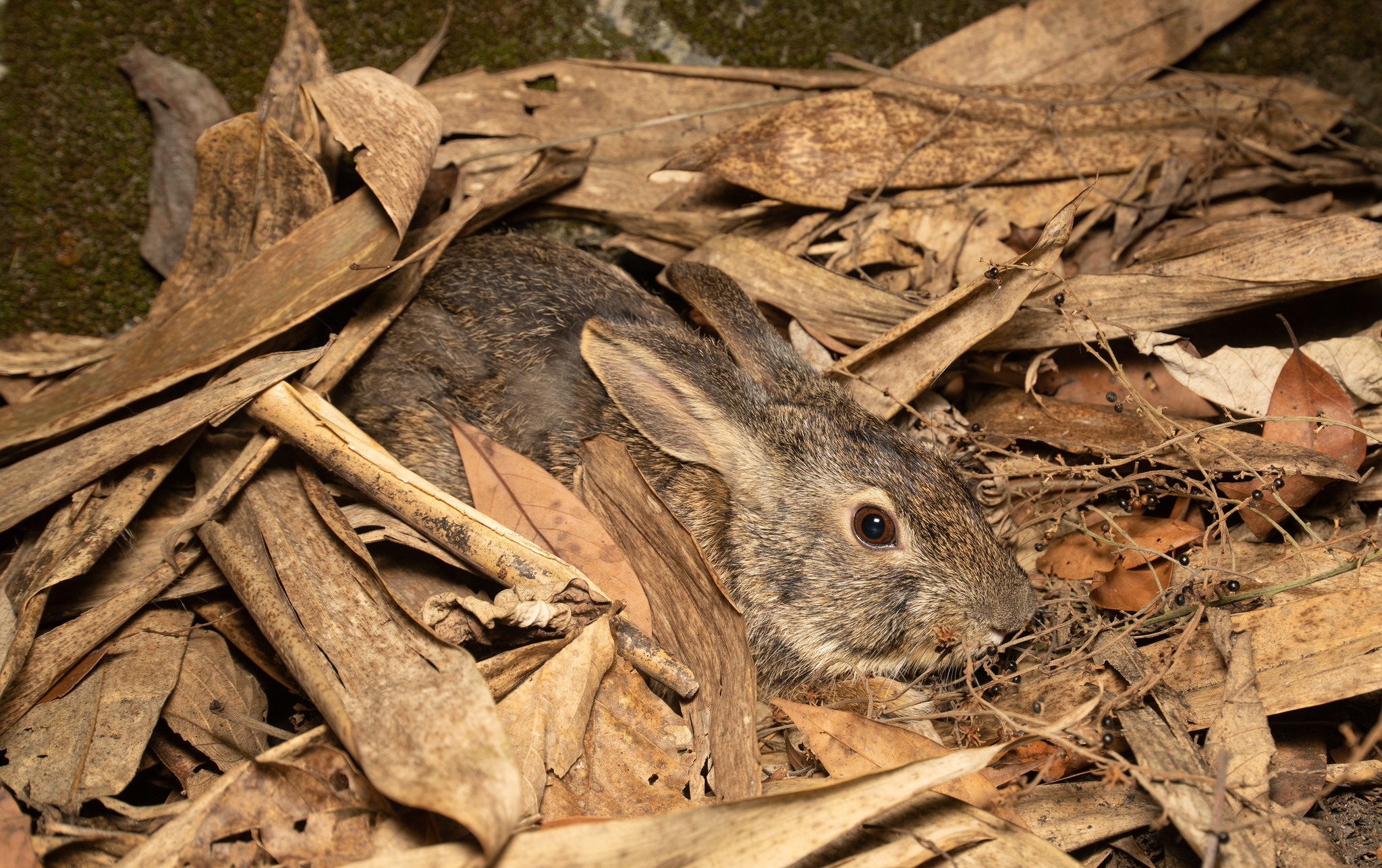
A Formosan hare hiding under leaf litter

The International Union for Conservation of Nature (IUCN) lists the Chinese hare in its Red List of Threatened Species as a least-concern species, and it is listed as the same under China's Red List. In Vietnam, it occurs in heavily populated areas and is at risk from hunting and habitat loss; as such, Chinese hare populations are thought to be very small there. There have been no confirmed records of the species in the country since the 1990s. No details about population trends outside of Vietnam are known. The Chinese hare occurs in several protected areas within China, such as Nanling National Forest Park and Wuyishan National Nature Reserve. Local groups hunt the hare for food and sell it in markets. This hunting is thought to be a major threat to the species' survival. The authors of the 2016 IUCN Red List assessment recommended that studies on the species' distribution be carried out to determine the impact of agriculture on populations. In a 2018 account of the species, mammalogist Andrew T. Smith stated it was "remarkable how little attention has been given to this species" based on how wide its geographic range is.
