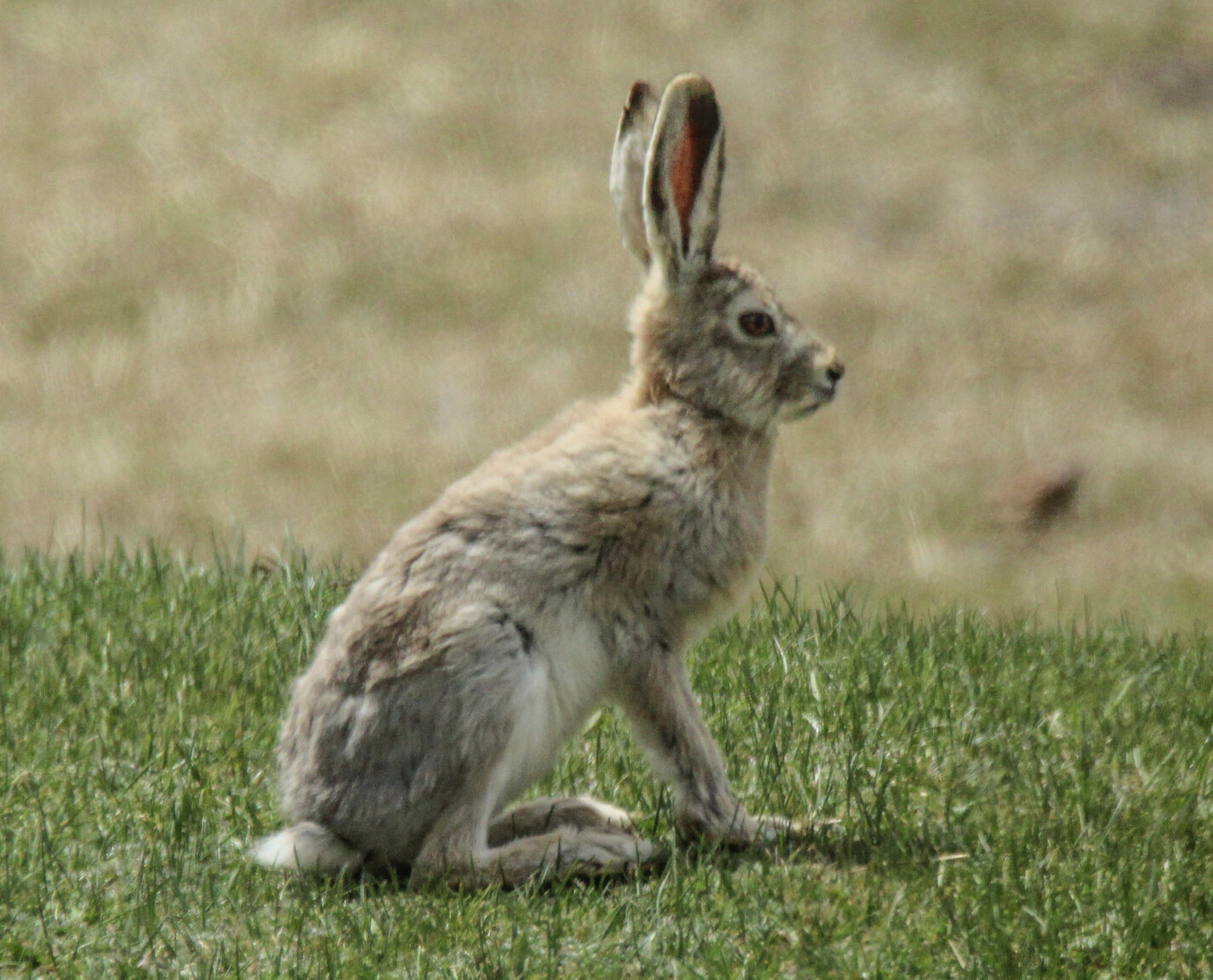
- Shughnon District, Tajikistan

Conservation status
- Least Concern (IUCN 3.1)

Scientific classification
- Kingdom: Animalia
- Phylum: Chordata
- Class: Mammalia
- Order: Lagomorpha
- Family: Leporidae
- Genus: Lepus
- Species: L. tibetanus

Binomial name
- Lepus tibetanus Waterhouse, 1841
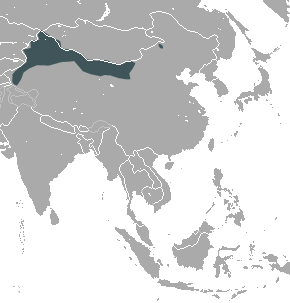
- Desert hare range

Synonyms
- List: Lepus pamirensis A. Günther, 1875; Lepus craspedotis Blanford, 1875; Lepus stoliczkanus Blanford, 1875; Lepus biddulphi Blanford, 1877; Lepus kaschgaricus Satunin, 1907; Lepus zaisanicus Satunin, 1907; Lepus quercerus Hollister, 1912

= Desert hare =

Species of mammal

The desert hare (Lepus tibetanus) is a species of hare found in Central Asia, Northwest China, and the western Indian subcontinent. It is a slender, sandy brown hare with black-tipped, tufted ears. It is an herbivore that feeds on roots, seeds, foliage, stems, berries, and the occasional cactus. It inhabits grassland, scrub areas of desert and semi-desert, and steppe habitats. The desert hare is most active during dusk, otherwise resting in a shallow depression or the burrow of another animal. Females produce 3 to 10 young in each litter, of which they may have up to three annually.

It is closely related to the Yarkand hare, with which it interbreeds and forms a hybrid species in regions near the Pamir Mountains. There has been much confusion regarding the taxonomy of the desert hare from the 1930s onwards due to the species complex present in the Cape hare species. China and the International Union for Conservation of Nature has assessed the desert hare as a least-concern species due to its wide distribution and a lack of evidence that its population is declining. Potential threats include human population expansion and hunting for food.

== Taxonomy and etymology ==
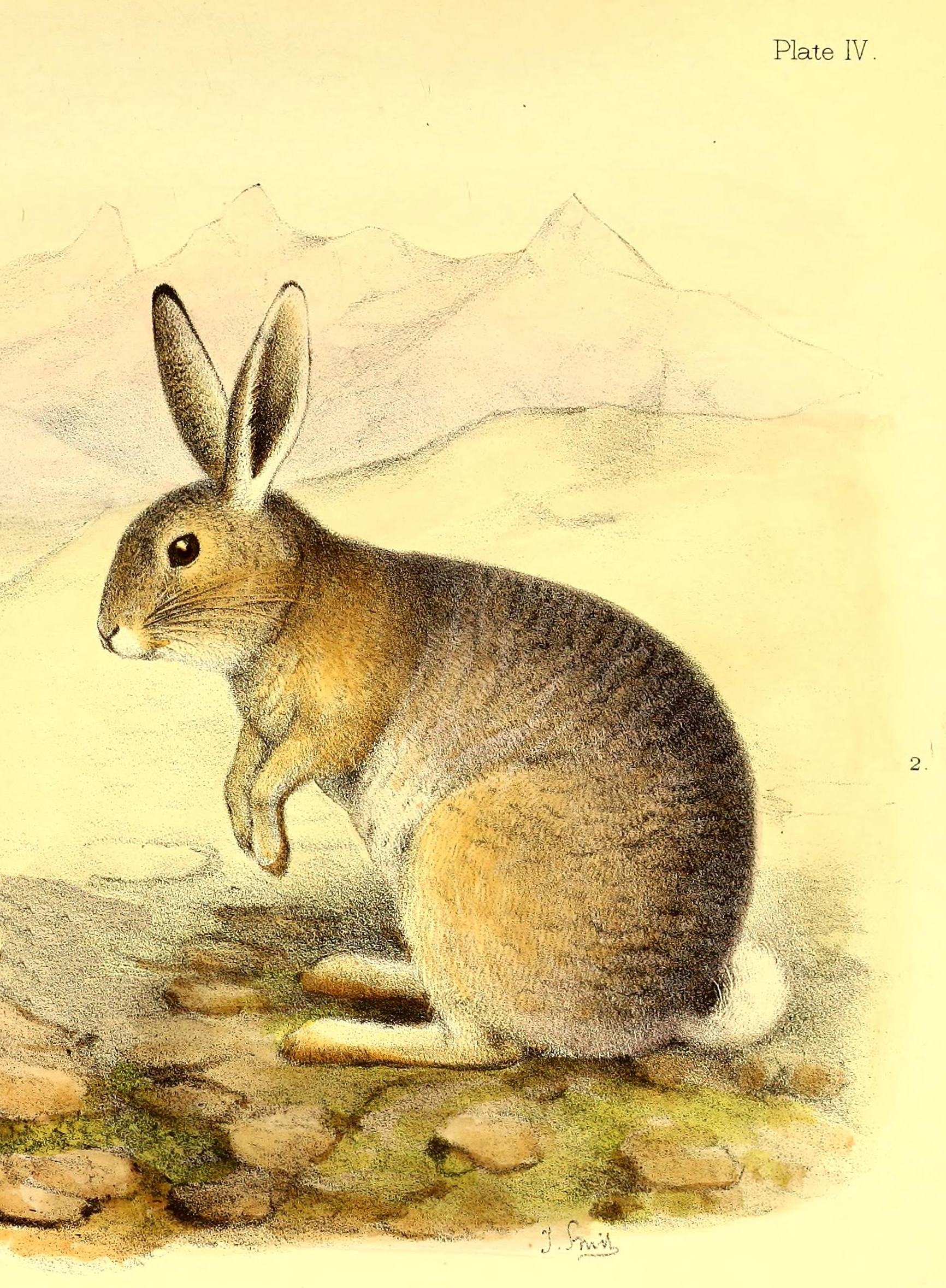
Illustration of the desert hare by Joseph Smit, 1879

The desert hare was first described by the English naturalist George Robert Waterhouse in 1841, based on notes provided to the Zoological Society of London by Godfrey Vigne. Waterhouse gave it the species name tibetanus based on the region it was found, that being Little Tibet (now Baltistan). Vigne said that the species could be distinguished from the similar alpine hare (Lepus timidus) by its larger ears. Waterhouse wrote in his description of the species that its pale gray fur, lacking in brown or yellow tints, was unique among the hares, and that compared to other hares, it had a smaller and proportionally narrower skull.

From 1841 up until the 1930s, the desert hare was considered an independent, monotypic species. Disagreement as to the hare's placement began in 1934, when Heptner attempted to unify the European (L. europaeus), tolai (L. tolai), and desert hares into one species. Ellerman attempted to place the desert and tolai hares as subspecies of the Cape hare (L. capensis) in 1955. A dissenting opinion from Ognev was published in 1966 that rejected the original unification of the species in 1934. Analyses in the 1980s attempted to solidify the hares' taxonomy; a study by Luo in 1981 supported the status quo at the time proposed by Ellerman, but the study's methodology was criticized, and a 1989 reevaluation of the data found significant separation between the desert and tolai hares. Five subspecies of the desert hare were recognized in the 2005 work Mammal Species of the World, but one of those subspecies, L. tibetanus centrasiaticus, has since been reassigned to the tolai hare. As of 2018, the species is considered monotypic, having no subspecies. Later studies have argued for the acceptance of the subspecies L. tibetanus pamirensis, present in a region that overlaps with the range of the Yarkand hare (L. yarkandensis). Reevaluation of the relationships between the known Asian hare species is necessary to make further useful distinctions between them, as their taxonomy continues to be controversial in the 21st century, particularly with regards to the Cape hare species complex.

=== Phylogeny ===
The desert hare has a diploid chromosome number of 48. According to molecular genetic analysis performed in 2024 by Leandro Iraçabal and colleagues, the most closely related species to the desert hare is the Yarkand hare:

- - - Lepus tibetanus
    - Lepus yarkandensis
  - - Lepus tolai
    - - - Lepus capensis
        - - Lepus coreanus
          - Lepus mandshuricus
      - - - Lepus townsendii
          - Lepus timidus
        - - Lepus othus
          - - Lepus arcticus
            - - Lepus corsicanus
              - Lepus castroviejoi
- Other hares

== Description ==
The desert hare is a lightly-built species with a small head. It grows to a head-and-body length of 40 to 48 centimetres (16 to 19 inches) with a tail measuring 8.7 to 10.9 cm (3.4 to 4.3 in), having an adult weight of 1.6 to 2.5 kilograms (3.5 to 5.5 pounds). Its ears measure from 8.1 to 11 cm (3.2 to 4.3 in) and the hind feet are 10.9 to 13.5 cm (4.3 to 5.3 in) in length. The hare's upper parts are sandy-yellow to drab brown glossed with black, the hip and buttocks area is greyish and the underparts are yellowish-white. The eye is surrounded by an area of pale skin and the ears are broad, lined with tufted hair inside and tipped with black. The forefeet are white as are the outer surfaces of the rear legs. The upper side of the tail has a brownish-black stripe. During the winter, the coat becomes thicker and grayer than during the summer, though it does not turn white as in other species.

The desert hare has some distinguishing skeletal features: its nasal bones are short, and it has a long premaxilla (a bone at the tip of the upper jaw). The auditory bullae, bones that surround the inner ear, are inflated. The hare's zygomatic arch (part of the cheekbone) is notably broad, and its brow ridge is flexed upwards. Like other leporids, it has a dental formula of 2.0.3.31.0.2.3 × 2 = 28—two pairs of upper and one pair of lower incisors, no canines, three upper and two lower premolars on each side, and three upper and lower molars on either side of the jaw.

== Distribution and habitat ==
The desert hare is native to Central Asia, its range extending from western and northern Pakistan through Afghanistan, into eastern Tajikistan, southeastern Kyrgyzstan, parts of Mongolia, Xinjiang, Gansu and Inner Mongolia in northern China. It is found in several locations alongside the tolai hare throughout the Tian Shan mountain ranges. The full extent of the desert hare's range remains unknown due to its remote distribution.

It is found at altitudes of up to 3,500 or 4,000 m (11,500 or 13,100 ft) in arid and semi-arid areas, scrubby deserts, grasslands and steppes. The true lower limit of the species' altitudinal range is unknown.

== Behaviour and ecology ==
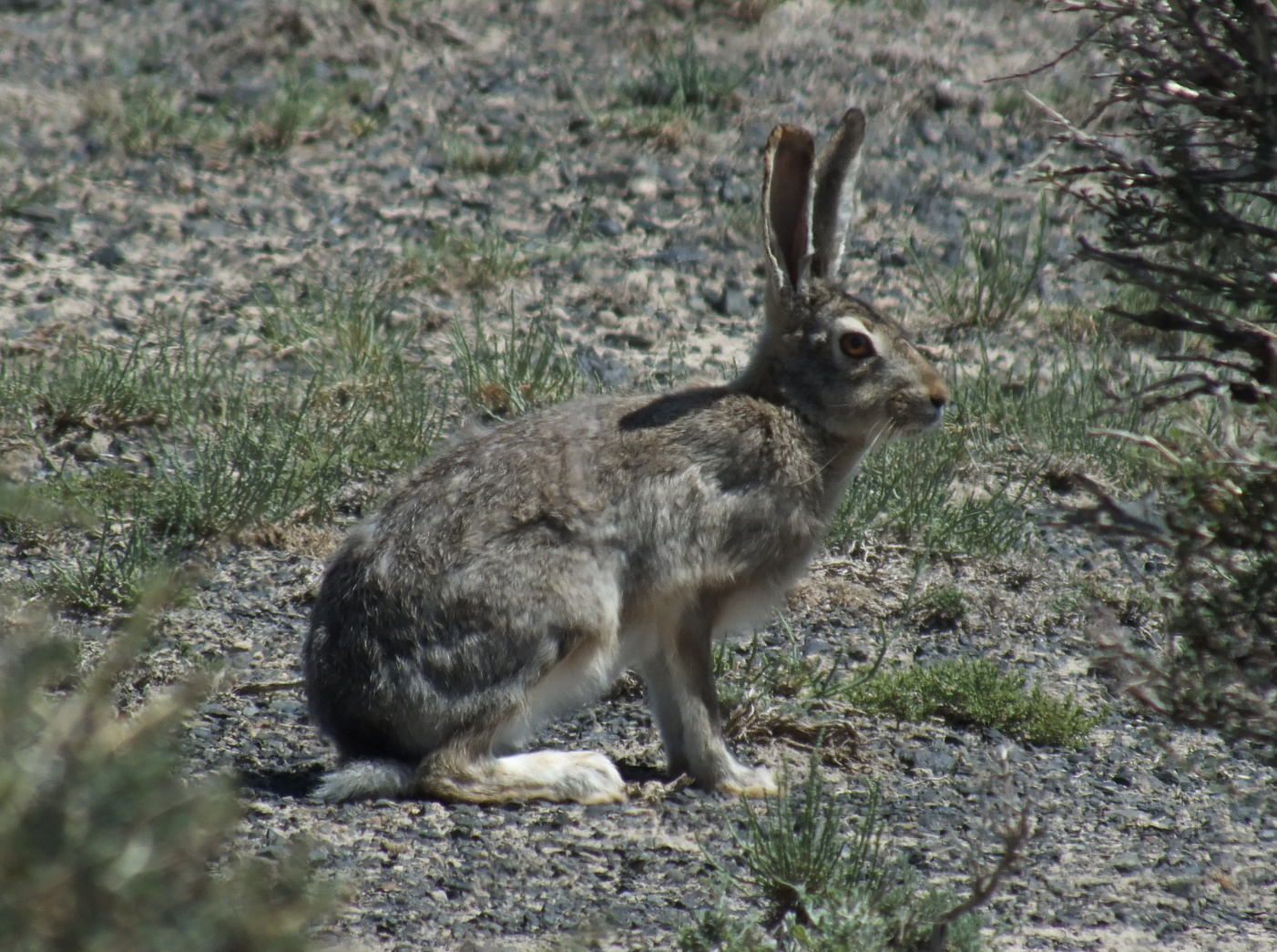
In Toli Township, Ürümqi County, Xinjiang, China

The desert hare is herbivorous; its diet includes roots, foliage, stems, berries and seeds. It also will sometimes feed on cacti for moisture. It mainly feeds around dusk, but sometimes emerges during the day. Like other hares, it does not dig itself a burrow, but lies concealed in a shallow depression called a form. Females have up to three litters per year, typically of three to ten young each time. It may make use of the burrows of other animals.

In the southwestern Pamir Mountains and the border areas between the Kashgar Basin and the Pamir, the desert hare interbreeds with the Yarkand hare due to overlapping or adjacent ranges. The hybrid zone is located between the two species along the border between the Pamir and the Kashgar Basin, resulting in a certain degree of genetic introgression and indistinguishable morphological traits in the external morphology of these hares. According to a study from 2024, with the southwestern Kashgar Basin serving as a refuge, the riverine hare may have migrated and spread multiple times throughout its evolutionary history, causing hybridization between hare species, leading to gene introgression and resulting in mixed relationships among hares in the southwestern Pamir and its surroundings. The population of desert hares present in this region was considered to be of the subspecies L. t. pamirensis.

== Conservation status ==
The desert hare has a wide range, but its population size and trend is not known. It is assessed by both the International Union for Conservation of Nature and China as a least-concern species. The only potential threat to desert hare populations is growing human populations throughout its range and subsistence hunting. If the population is shrinking, it is doing so at too slow a rate to qualify for a more threatened category.
