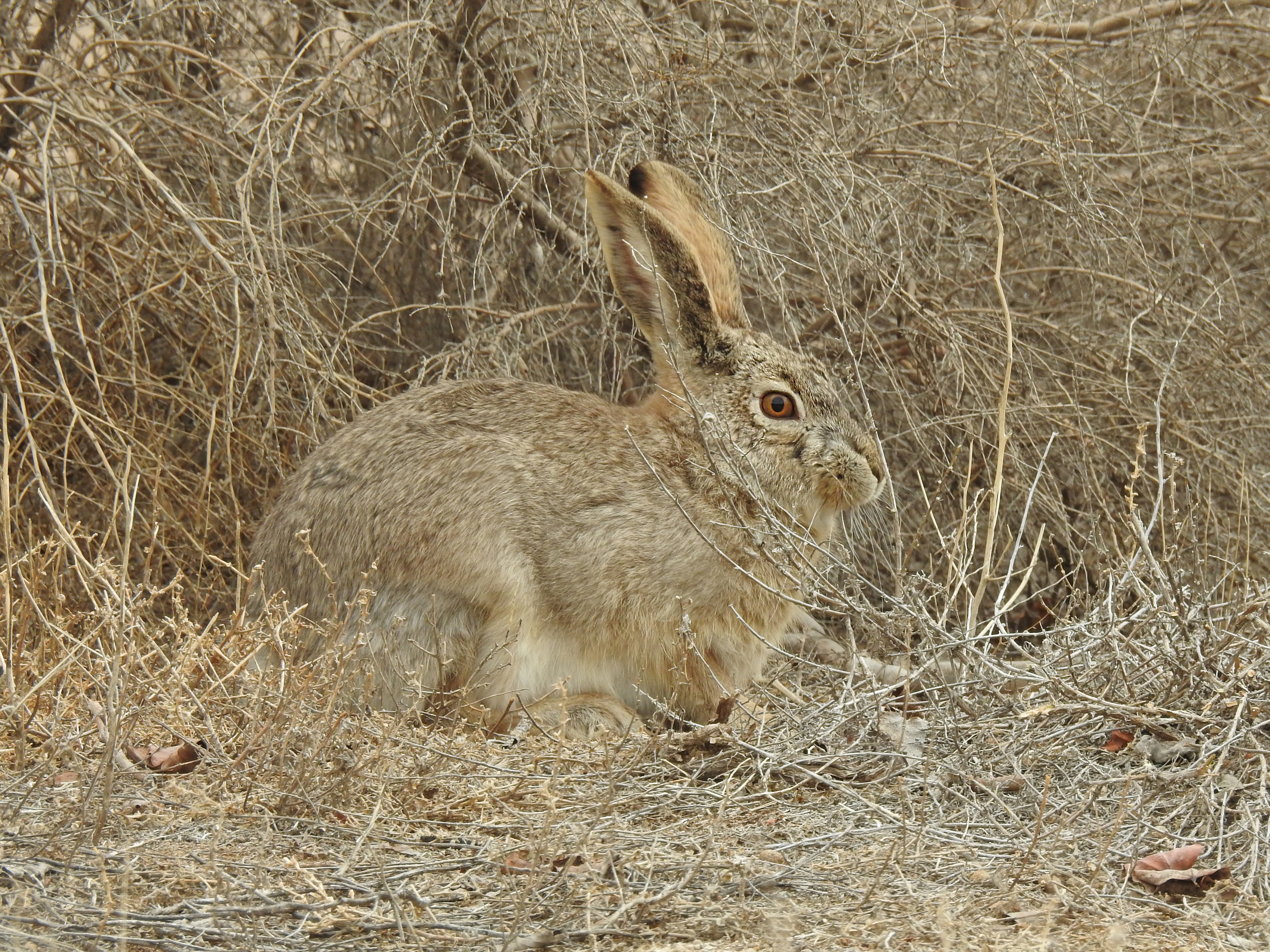
- Altyn-Emel National Park, Kazakhstan

Conservation status
- Least Concern (IUCN 3.1)

Scientific classification
- Kingdom: Animalia
- Phylum: Chordata
- Class: Mammalia
- Order: Lagomorpha
- Family: Leporidae
- Genus: Lepus
- Species: L. tolai

Binomial name
- Lepus tolai Pallas, 1778
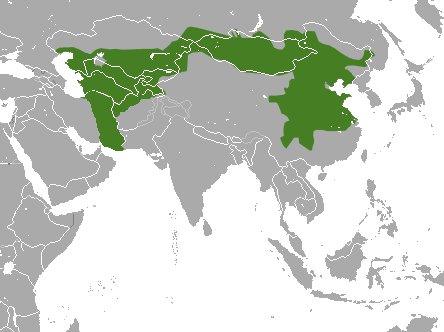
- Tolai hare range

Synonyms
- List: Lepus aralensis Severtzov, 1861; Lepus lehmanni Severtzov, 1873; Lepus butlerowi Bogdanov, 1882; Lepus kessleri Bogdanov, 1882; Lepus swinhoei O. Thomas, 1894; Lepus centrasiaticus Satunin, 1907; Lepus gansuicus Satunin, 1907; Lepus gobicus Satunin, 1907; Lepus filchneri Matschie, 1908; Lepus stegmanni Matschie, 1908; Lepus swinhoei subluteus O. Thomas, 1908; Lepus swinhoei brevinasus J. A. Allen, 1909; Lepus aurigineus Hollister, 1912; Lepus swinhoei sowerbyae Hollister, 1912; Lepus tolai bucharensis Ognev, 1922; Lepus wongi Yang Zhongjian, 1927; Lepus tolai desertorum Ognev & Heptner, 1928; Lepus europaeus turcomanus Heptner, 1934; Lepus europaeus cinnamomeus Shamel, 1940; Lepus capensis cheybani Baloutch, 1979; Lepus capensis habibi Baloutch, 1979; Lepus capensis petteri Baloutch, 1979; Lepus capensis huangshuiensis Luo Zexun, 1982

= Tolai hare =

Species of mammal

The tolai hare (Lepus tolai) is a species of hare native to Central Asia, including much of Mongolia, eastern Iran, Afghanistan, southern Kazakhstan, Turkmenistan, Uzbekistan, Kyrgyzstan, and North and Central China. It inhabits semi-desert, steppes, rocky habitats, grasslands, and river valleys. A yellow, brown or grey-furred hare with long, black tipped ears, the adult tolai hare weighs between 1.7 and 2.7 kilograms (3.7 and 6.0 pounds) and measures between 40 and 59 centimetres (16 and 23 inches). It is mainly active at dusk and night but is occasionally active during the day to forage for seeds, roots, and other plant matter. Young hares are often more active in daylight hours.

A widespread, fairly common species, the tolai hare has a stable population. It breeds often, two to three times per year, and is hunted for its meat, fur, and for use in traditional medicine. Hustai National Park is one of several protected areas where the hare can be found. Authorities in China and Mongolia, as well as the International Union for Conservation of Nature, consider it a least-concern species.

== Taxonomy and etymology ==
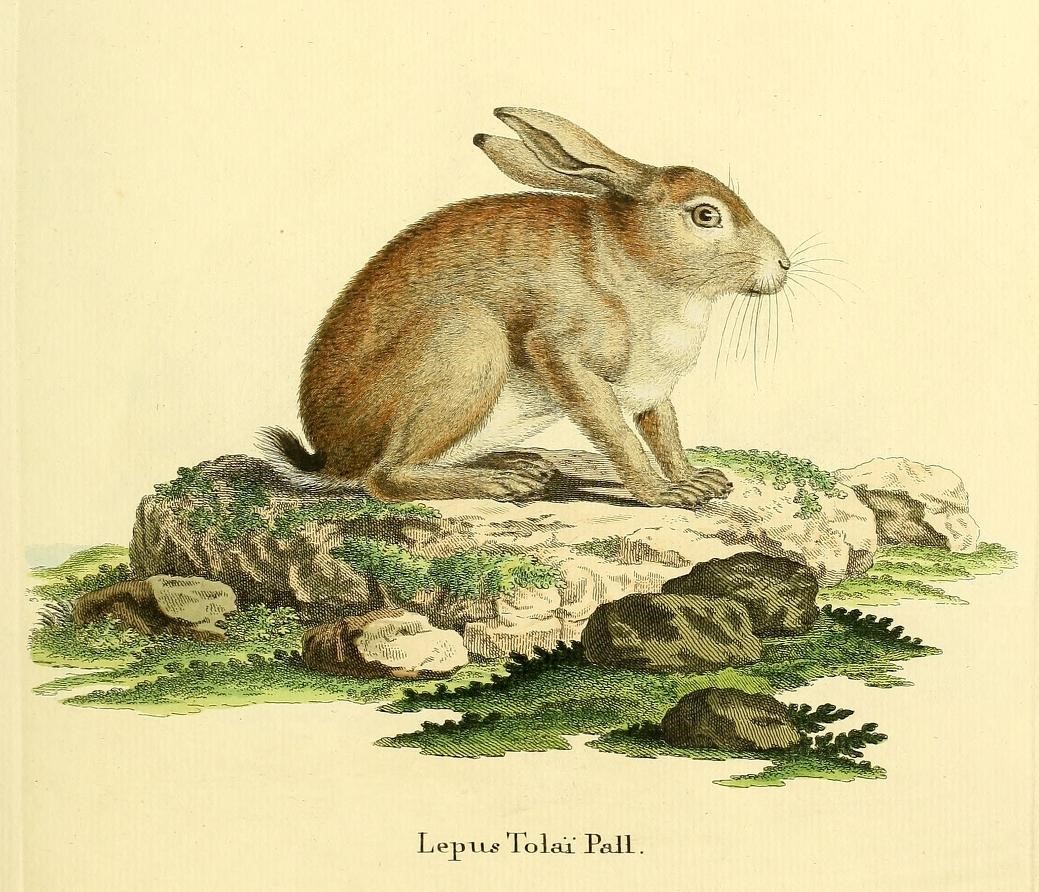
Engraving of the tolai hare by Johann Nufsbiegel

The tolai hare was first described by the German naturalist Peter Simon Pallas in 1778. He gave it the name 'tolai' as this was the common name for 'hare' among the Mongols and Kalmyks. This word is attested to in later works as tōlai, dolai or taulai in the Mongolian language. Its type locality was described as a rocky or sandy plain near the Selenga river; Ellerman and Morrison-Scott wrote in 1951 that a more likely description of the locality was at Adinscholo Mountain on the river Borzya, which is some 700 kilometres (430 miles) east of the Selenga.

The phylogenetics of the tolai hare and its subspecies have been contested. It was formerly included with the cape hare (L. capensis), as well as the European hare (L. europaeus) and the desert hare (L. tibetanus). Even after the tolai hare was separated into a distinct species, there remained confusion among its subspecies. The subspecies L. tolai centrasiaticus has since been reassigned to the desert hare, but genetic analysis has made the position of L. t. centrasiaticus less certain, indicating that it may be closer to the tolai hare than the desert hare. Furthermore, the subspecies L. tolai swinhoei has been proposed as representing a distinct species, and L. przewalskii has been reassigned as a synonym of the woolly hare (L. oiostolus).

Ten subspecies of the tolai hare are known, with eight accepted in the third edition of Mammal Species of the World and two more (centrasiaticus and huangshuiensis) proposed since its publication:

- L. t. tolai, nominate subspecies found in Inner Mongolia and Gansu
- L. t. aurigineus, found in Jiangxi, Anhui, Hubei, Shaanxi, Sichuan, and Guizhou
- L. t. buchariensis, unknown range, may extend into Iran and beyond
- L. t. centrasiaticus, found in Xinjiang, Gansu, and Inner Mongolia
- L. t. cheybani, unknown range, may extend into Iran and beyond
- L. t. cinnamomeus, found in Sichuan and Yunnan
- L. t. filchneri, unknown range, may extend into Iran and beyond
- L. t. huangshuiensis, found in Qinghai
- L. t. lehmanni, found in Xinjiang
- L. t. swinhoei, found in Heilongjiang, Jilin, Liaoning, Inner Mongolia, Hebei, Beijing, Henan, Shaanxi, Shanxi, and Shandong

According to molecular genetic analysis performed in 2024 by Leandro Iraçabal and colleagues, the sister clade of the tolai hare is a group that includes nine species of widely distributed hares:

The tolai hare, its sister clade, and other hares

- - Lepus tolai
  - - - Lepus capensis
      - - Lepus coreanus
        - Lepus mandshuricus
    - - - Lepus townsendii
        - Lepus timidus
      - - Lepus othus
        - - Lepus arcticus
          - - Lepus corsicanus
            - Lepus castroviejoi
- Other hares

== Description ==
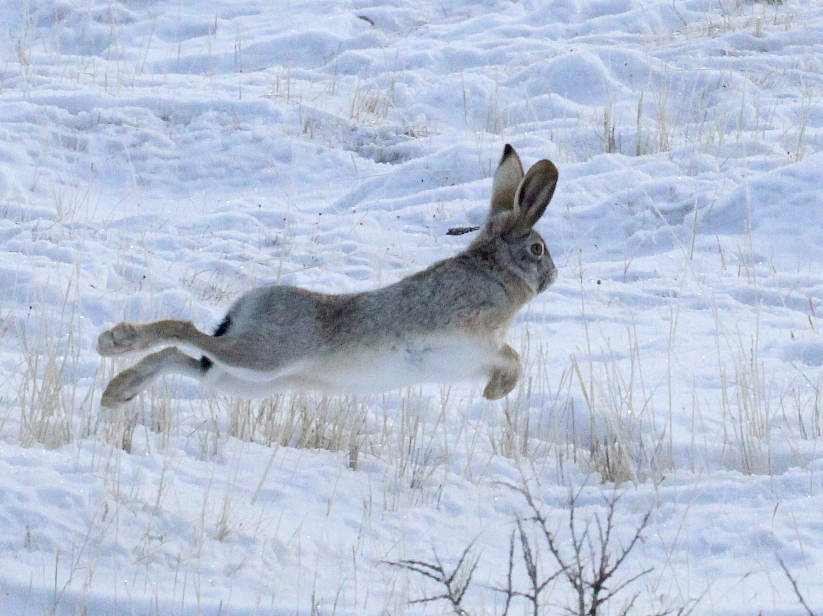
A tolai hare seen in the Altai Republic, Russia

The tolai hare grows to a head-and-body length of 40 to 59 centimetres (16 to 23 inches) with a tail of 72 to 110 millimetres (2.8 to 4.3 in). The ears range from 80 to 120 mm (3.1 to 4.7 in) in length, and the hind feet measure 110 to 127 mm (4.3 to 5.0 in). Adult hares weigh from 1.7 to 2.7 kilograms (3.7 to 6.0 pounds). The tolai hare is variable in colouration across its range. Its upper parts range from dusty yellow to pale brown, sandy yellow or sandy grey and may have dark brownish or reddish stripes. The hip region is sometimes ochre or grey. The head has a pale, bare, greyish or ochraceous patch of skin surrounding the eye and extending forwards to near the muzzle and backwards to the base of the long ears, which have black tips. The underparts and flanks are pure white. The tail has a broad black or brownish-black stripe on the top. Like other leporids, it has a dental formula of 2.0.3.31.0.2.3 × 2 = 28—two pairs of upper and one pair of lower incisors, no canines, three upper and two lower premolars on each side, and three upper and lower molars on either side of the jaw.

There are few features that can be used to differentiate the subspecies of the tolai hare, as their original descriptions were based largely on external characteristics and had small sample sizes. The distinctions between them remain unclear due to the species' gradual shifts in colouration across its range.

== Distribution and habitat ==
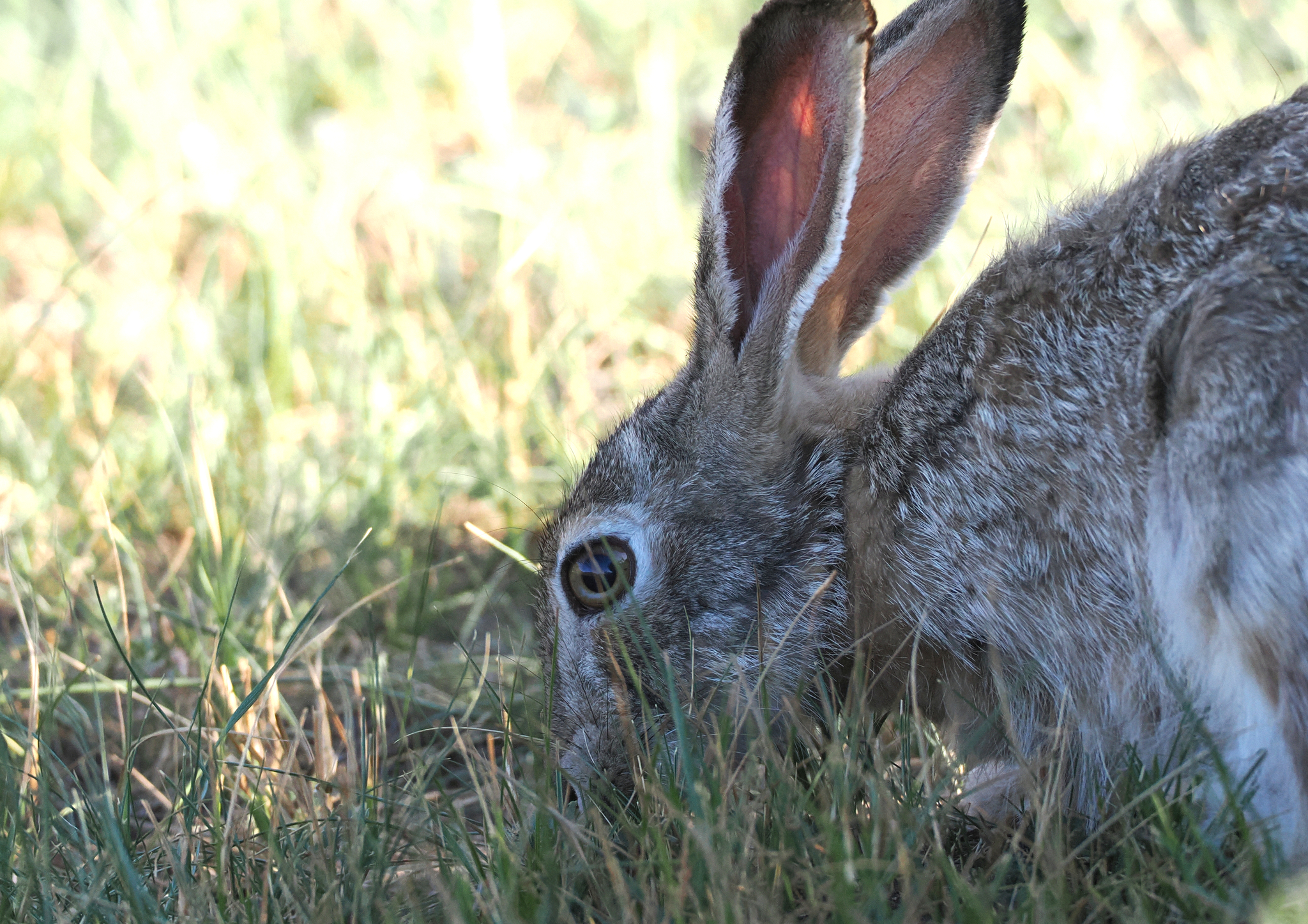
Feeding in Rashaant, Bulgan, Mongolia

The tolai hare is native to central and eastern Asia. Its range extends from the eastern side of the Caspian Sea through eastern Iran, Afghanistan, southern Kazakhstan, Turkmenistan, Uzbekistan and Kyrgyzstan, through southern Siberia and Mongolia to western, central and north-eastern China. Its elevation range is generally between 600 and 900 m (2,000 and 3,000 ft), but a single individual has been recorded much higher, at an elevation of 4,900 m (16,100 ft). One specimen found in Jammu and Kashmir may indicate a southern extension of the species' distribution.

The hare is found across various habitats, from arid sand dunes to river valleys with tall vegetation. The wetter regions are preferred, with populations being described as "abundant" in the Hailar river valley. It avoids steppes where low-lying vegetation grows. Other habitats with reported tolai hare populations include grasslands, deserts, semi-deserts, rocky habitats, and forest steppes, though it is not found in heavily forested areas.

== Ecology and behaviour ==
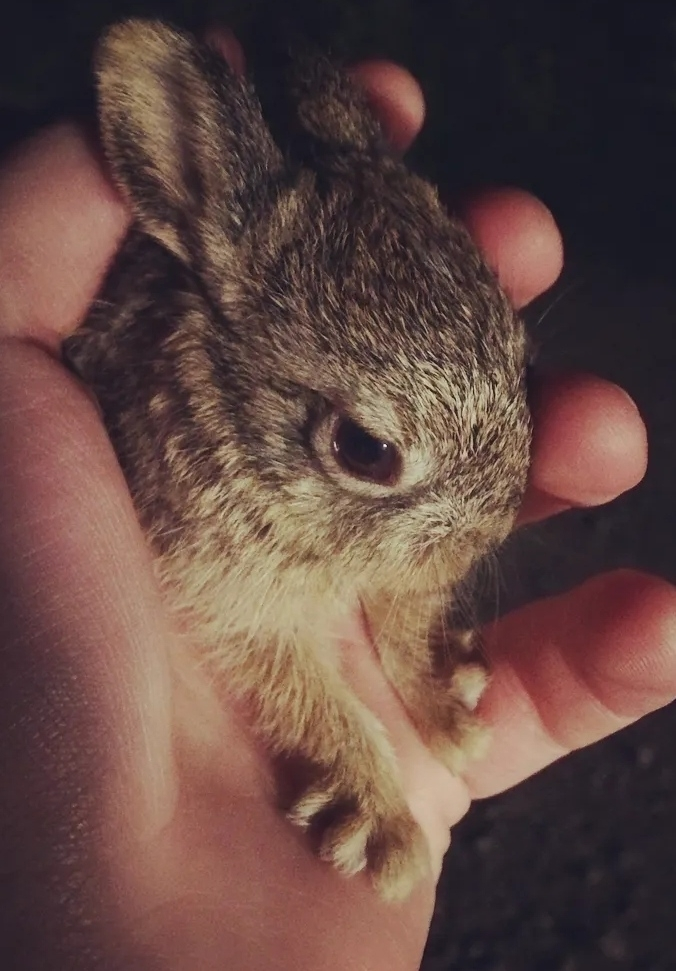
A young tolai hare in Kegeti, Kyrgyzstan

The tolai hare is a nocturnal species and feeds on grasses, sedges, wood and bark, seeds, bulbs, shoots and roots. It occasionally deviates from its nocturnal habits to forage during daylight; young hares are generally more active during the day. It does not dig a burrow except when it is breeding, but scrapes out a depression in the ground (known as a form) with its front paws in which to rest during the day. This scoop is shallow in hot weather but is deeper in colder conditions. Breeding takes place two or three times a year, with litters of two to six young being produced each time. Subsequent litters are usually smaller than those that precede it in a season. The breeding season generally starts in late February and extends to March, but may start earlier or last for longer depending on location. In some regions, the breeding season lasts for up to five months. The species has a diploid chromosome number of 48.

Several parasites in the genus Eimeria are known to use the tolai hare as a host, namely E. leporis and E. gobiensis. 22 species of ticks have been found on tolai hares, including those from the genera Dermacentor and Rhipicephalus. The spring and summer months typically bring the greatest numbers of mites. Fleas, trematodes, cestodes and nematodes are also found on or in tolai hares. The hares also carry diseases such as tularemia, plague, and the brucellosis pathogen.

== Interaction with humans ==
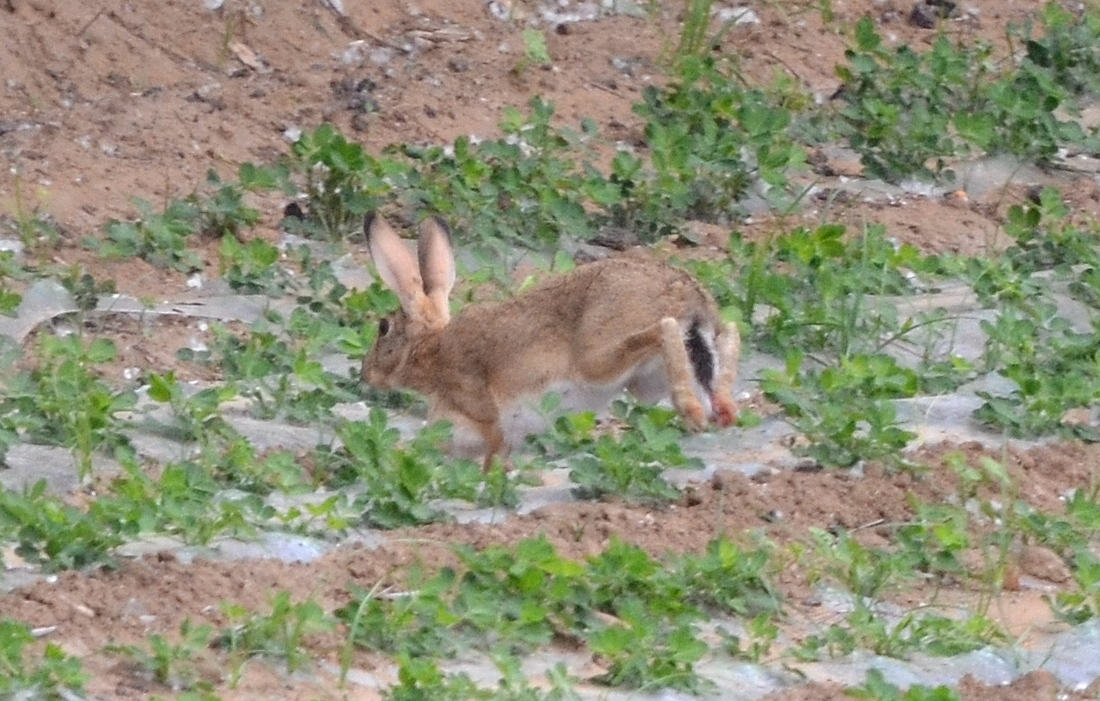
A tolai hare among crops in Zhongmu County, China

Tolai hares are hunted for food and furs, though this latter use has declined, with fur harvests decreasing more than tenfold in southern Uzbekistan from 1959 to 1977. The hare is also used in traditional medicine. In eastern Mongolia, a consistent harvest of about 1,000 hares is reported annually. In the Neolithic Yangjiesha site of Loess Plateau, signs of commensal behavior (taming) between tolai hares and humans have been found.

=== Conservation status ===
The tolai hare has a wide range, a large population, and is generally a common species. Growing human populations and displacement of hares from their habitat poses a potential threat, though it has not been studied extensively. Protected areas, such as parks like Hustai National Park, cover roughly 12% of the species' range. The International Union for Conservation of Nature has assessed its conservation status as being of least concern, and this same status is used by regional conservation lists in China and Mongolia.
