= Brown hare =

Brown hare may refer to:

- Cape hare (Lepus capensis)
- European hare (Lepus europaeus)

== See also ==
- Brown hair
