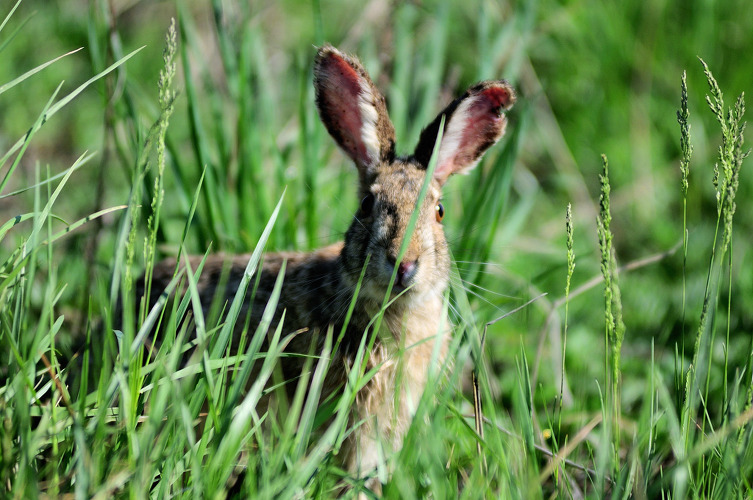
- Lepus coreanus in Gangwon Province, South Korea

Conservation status
- Least Concern (IUCN 3.1)

Scientific classification
- Kingdom: Animalia
- Phylum: Chordata
- Class: Mammalia
- Order: Lagomorpha
- Family: Leporidae
- Genus: Lepus
- Species: L. coreanus

Binomial name
- Lepus coreanus Thomas, 1892
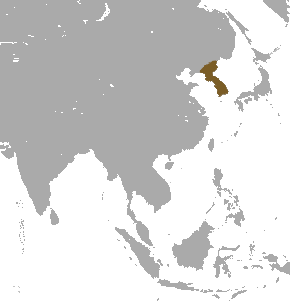
- Korean hare range

= Korean hare =

Species of mammal

The Korean hare (Lepus coreanus) (Korean: 멧토끼, 산토끼, romanized: mettokki, santokki; Chinese: 高丽兎; pinyin: gāolí tù) is a species of hare native to the Korean Peninsula and adjoining parts of northeastern China. The Korean hare inhabits diverse habitats within its range, from remote mountain forests to cultivated land. Fur colour varies slightly among individuals, but is generally some shade of liver brown.

== Description ==
An adult Korean hare weighs 2.1–2.6 kg (4.6–5.7 lb) and has a body length of 45–54 cm (18–21 in). The tail is typically 2–5 cm (0.79–1.97 in) in length, and the ears are 7.6–8.3 cm (3.0–3.3 in) long.

== Taxonomy ==
The Korean hare was first described by Thomas in 1892. Five other species of hare in the genus Lepus occur in eastern Asia: the Chinese hare (L. sinensis), the mountain hare (L. timidus), the Manchurian hare (L. mandshuricus), the Japanese hare (L. brachyurus) and the brown hare (L. capensis). In 1974, the Korean hare was considered to be a subspecies of L. brachyurus and in 1978, a subspecies of L. sinensis, however, a study of mtDNA published in 2010 showed that the Korean hare is a valid species (L. coreanus).

== Distribution and habitat ==
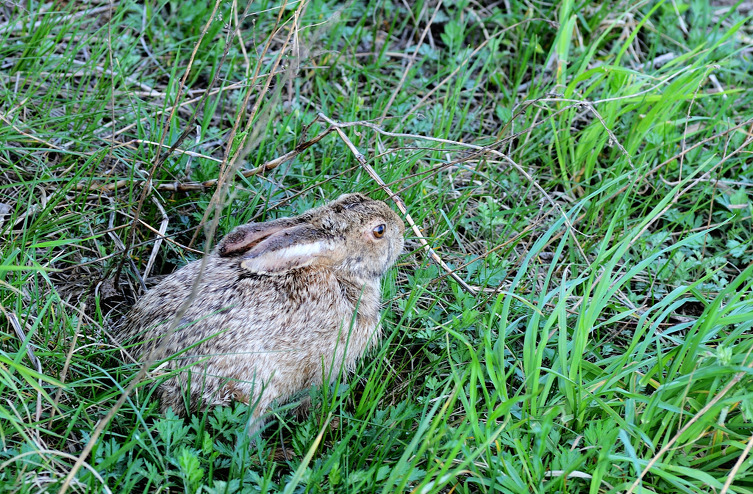
A Korean hare near Wonju Airport

The Korean hare is native to the Korean Peninsula and the Jilin Province in northeastern China. It is found on plains, in scrublands and in mountainous regions. Densities ranged from no individuals on coastal cultivated land to four individuals per square kilometre (0.4 square mile) in the hills and five per square kilometres in the mountains. A study in the Jirisan National Park in South Korea found that its abundance increased in proportion to the density of scrub cover in its habitat.

== Conservation ==
The IUCN, in its Red List of Threatened Species, lists the Korean hare as being of "Least Concern". This is because, although the population trend is unknown, this hare seems to be a common species without any specific identified threats. It has been reported as damaging barley crops in the foothills of South Gyeongsang Province, and ringing the bark and killing peach trees in South Jeolla Province, both in South Korea.

The Ministry of Environment in South Korea designated it as an Endangered species candidate in 2018.

== See also ==
- List of mammals of Korea
