= Nanling National Forest Park =

Forest park in Guangdong, China

Coordinates: 24°53′35″N 113°03′20″E

- Interactive map of Nanling National Forest Park
- Location: 广东省韶关市Ruyuan Yao Autonomous County
- Area: 27333.33公顷
- Established: 1993.3

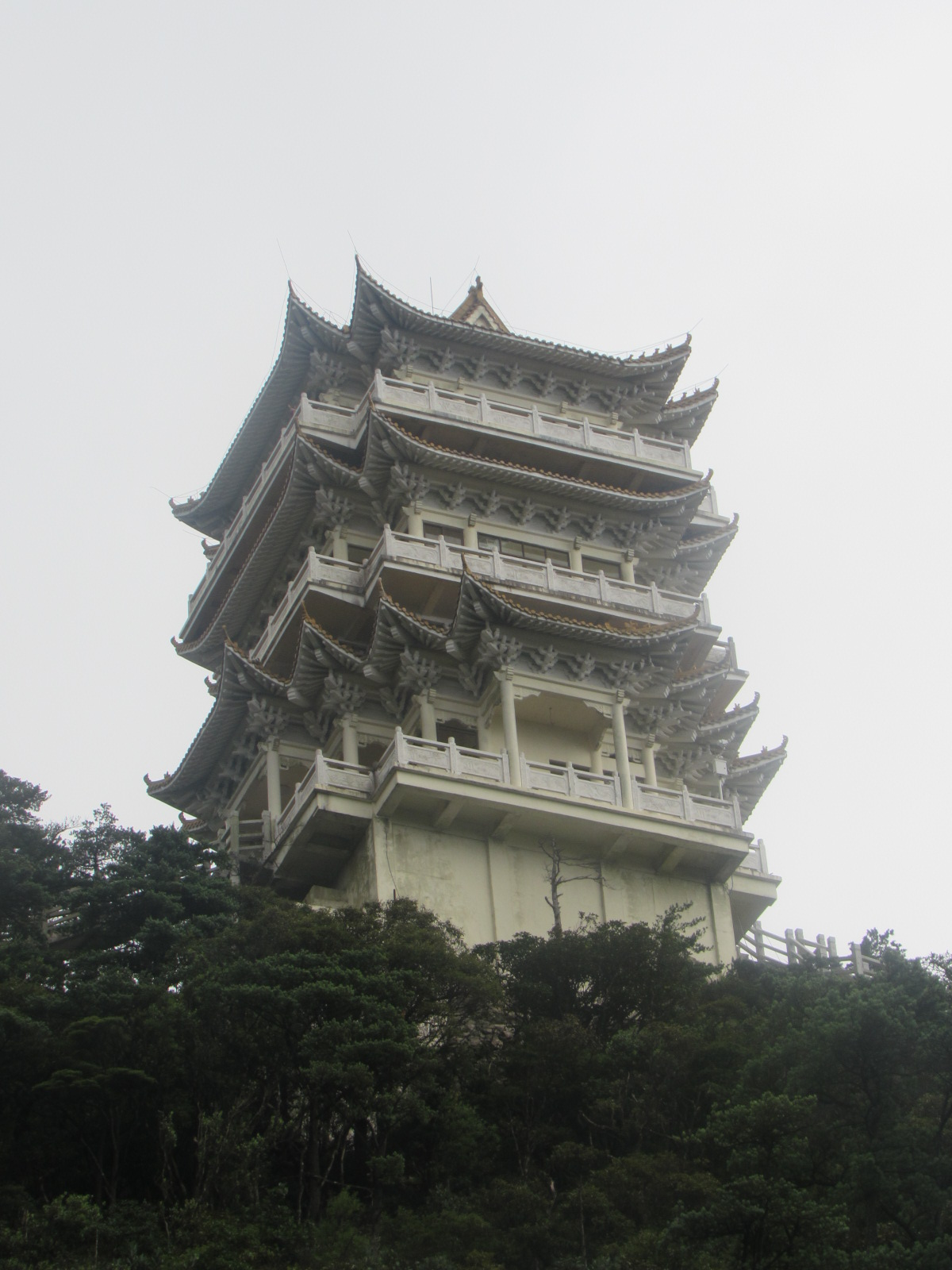
Rufeng Pavilion, located on Rufeng Peak in Xiaohuangshan

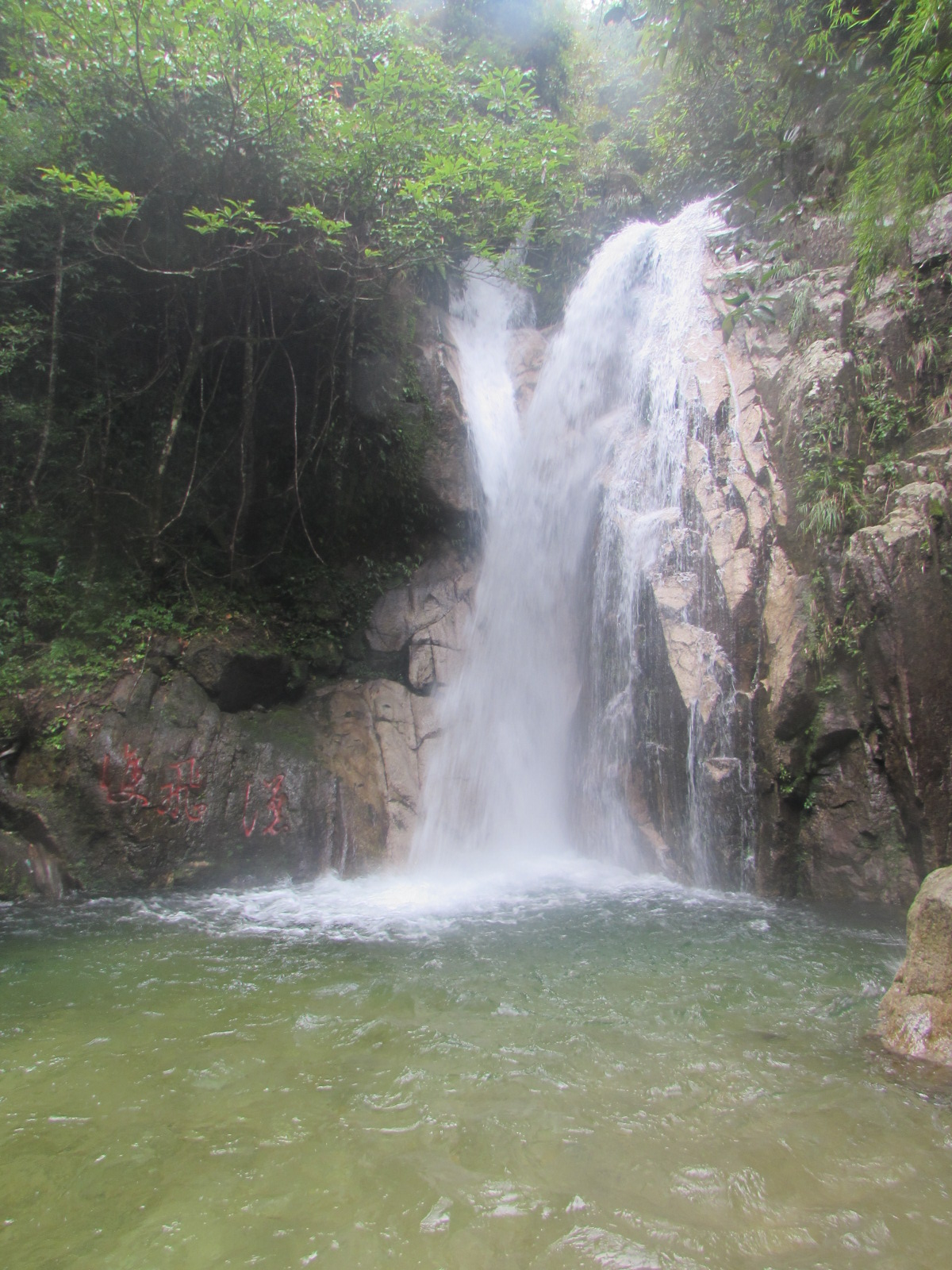
Shuangfei Waterfall

Nanling National Forest Park is located in Ruyuan Yao Autonomous County, Shaoguan City, Guangdong Province, China, near Mangshan in Hunan Province. It lies in the core area of the Nanling Mountains and is the largest nature reserve in Guangdong Province, with a total area of approximately 273 square kilometers.

It is the source of the Bei River, a tributary of the Pearl River. Shikengkong, with an elevation of 1,902 meters, is the highest peak in Guangdong Province.

== History ==
Its predecessor can be traced back to the 1950s, when it was known as the Ruyang Forest Farm, one of the state-owned forest farms directly under the Guangdong Provincial Forestry Department. The Ruyang Forest Farm was later reorganized into the Ruyang Forestry Bureau.

In 2012, the Nanling National Forest Park was rated as a National 4A-level tourist attraction. It was suspended for rectification starting April 23, 2018.

== scenic area ==
Nanling National Forest Park is divided into four scenic areas: Xiaohuangshan, Waterfall Cluster, Qingshuigu (Water-Contact Valley), and Shikengkong.

== See also ==
- Nanling Mountains
- Nanling National Nature Reserve
