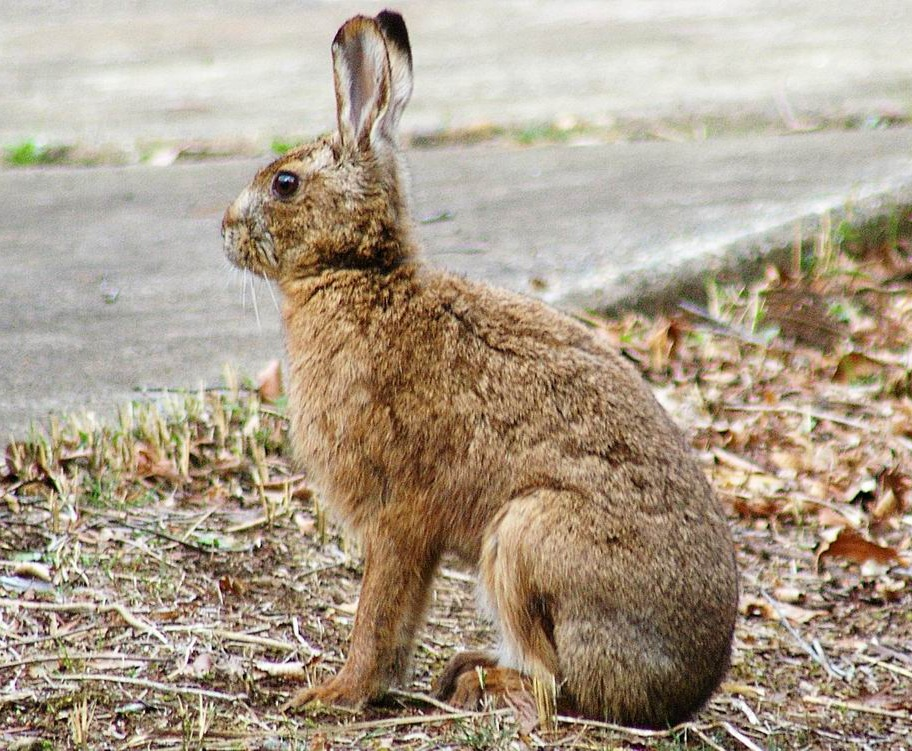
- in March, in a park in Tsukuba, Japan

Conservation status
- Least Concern (IUCN 3.1)

Scientific classification
- Kingdom: Animalia
- Phylum: Chordata
- Class: Mammalia
- Infraclass: Placentalia
- Order: Lagomorpha
- Family: Leporidae
- Genus: Lepus
- Species: L. brachyurus

Binomial name
- Lepus brachyurus Temminck, 1845
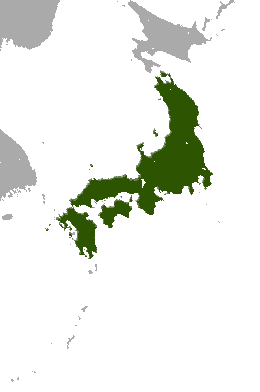
- Japanese hare range

= Japanese hare =

Species of mammal

The Japanese hare (Lepus brachyurus) is a species of hare endemic to Japan. In Japanese, it is called the Nousagi (Japanese: 野兎), meaning "field rabbit".

== Taxonomy ==
Coenraad Jacob Temminck described the Japanese hare in 1845. The specific epithet (brachyurus) is derived from the Ancient Greek brachys meaning "short" and oura meaning "tail".

The four subspecies of this hare are recognized:

- L. b. angustidens, in northern Honshu and on the Sea of Japan side of Honshu
- L. b. brachyurus, on the Pacific side of northern Honshu, in Shikoku and Kyushu
- L. b. lyoni, on Sado Island
- L. b. okiensis, on the Oki Islands

== Description ==
The Japanese hare is reddish-brown to dark brown-grey and variable amounts of white on the head and legs. Its body length ranges from 45 to 54 cm, and it has a body weight of 2.1-2.6 kg (4.6-5.7 lb). Its tail grows to lengths of 2-5 cm and its back legs are 12-15 cm long. The ears grow to be 7.6-8.3 cm long. Its front legs can be from 10-15 cm long.

In areas of northern Japan, especially the island of Sado, the Japanese hare loses its coloration in the autumn, remaining white until spring, when the brown fur returns. They change into their white winter coat from mid-September to the end of November and back into their brown summer coat from the end of January to May.

== Habitat ==
The Japanese hare is found across Honshu, Shikoku, and Kyushu, that is, all the main islands of Japan except Hokkaido, where it is replaced by the related mountain hare (Lepus timidus). It occurs up to an altitude of 2,700 metres (8,900 ft). It is mostly found in mountains or hilly areas. It also inhabits forests or brushy areas. Japanese hares have been able to adapt to and thrive in and around urban environments following encroachment by human settlements, so much so that it has become a nuisance in some places.

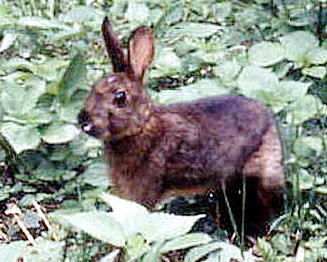
A Japanese hare in brown pelage

== Reproduction ==
The litter size of the Japanese hare varies. Animals living in the north of their range typically give birth to one to four young (called leverets), while animals in the south have litters of one to three. In the North the breeding season last from February to July with a gestation period from 42 to 43 days and a birth weight of 77 to 165 grams (2.7 to 5.8 oz). In the South of Japan breeding occurs all year round with a gestation period of 45 to 48 days and a birth weight of 125 to 150 grams (4.4 to 5.3 oz). Young leverets can run within one hour after birth. They get nursed only once per day at around midnight and start feeding on vegetation on day eight. Weaning takes place at the age of four weeks.

Females reach sexual maturity at eight to ten months old. Several litters are born each year. Mating is promiscuous; males chase females, and box to repel rivals.

== Behavior ==
The Japanese hare is nocturnal (becomes active from around 19:00 to 8:00). It is silent except when it is in distress, and gives out a call for the distress. It can occupy burrows sometimes. It is a solitary animal except during mating season, when males and females gather for breeding.

Their average lifespan is just above one year, but they can reach a maximum age of four years.

Natural predators of this hare are red fox, Japanese marten, Japanese weasel and birds of prey (such as Eurasian goshawk, golden eagle, mountain hawk-eagle).

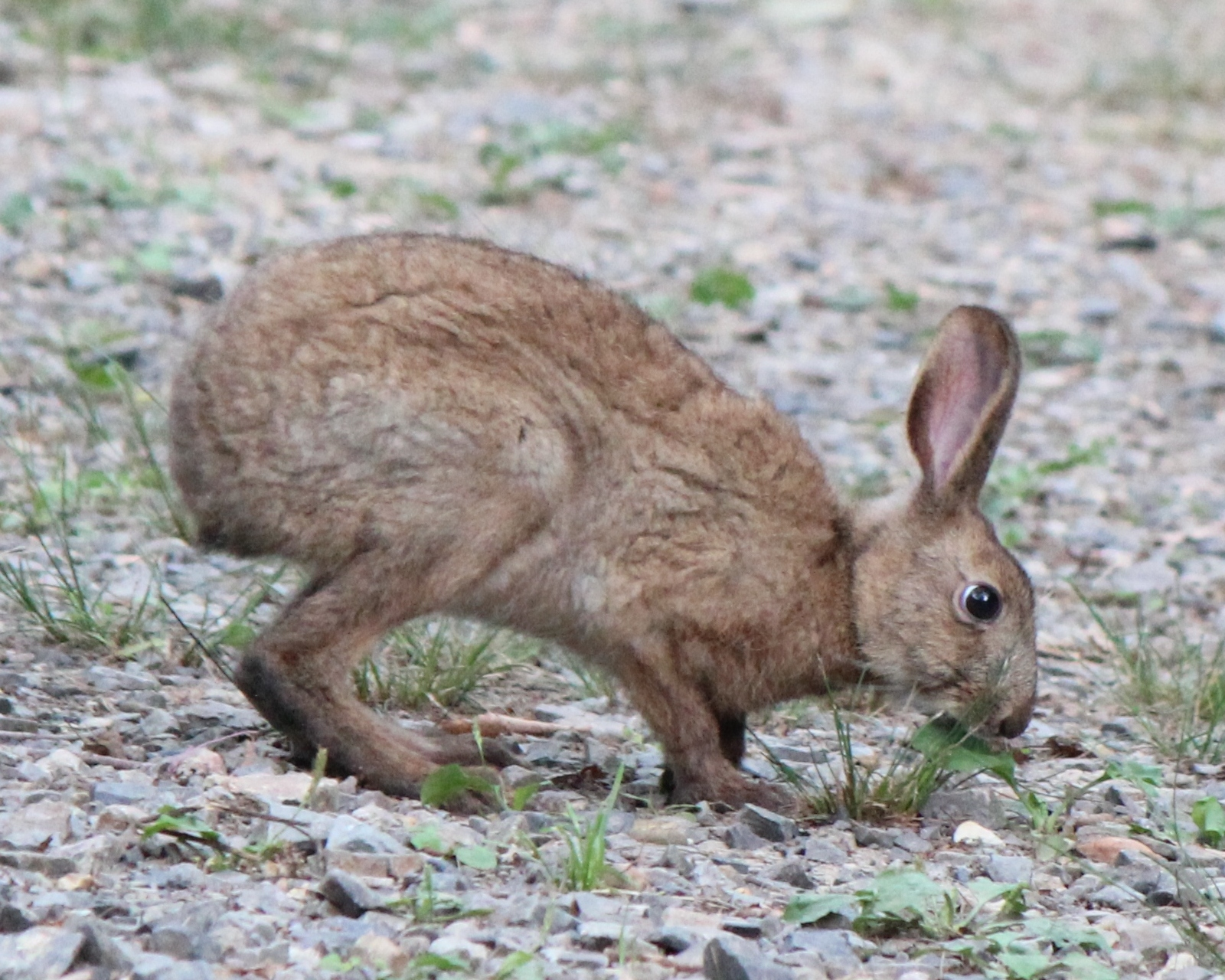
Japanese hare eating grass

== Food ==
Japanese hares feed on more than 150 different plant species including grasses, herbs, twigs, and shoots. Furthermore, they are known to eat the bark of larger twigs. They eat 200 to 500 grams (7.1 to 17.6 oz) of plant matter every day, which makes up 10 to 20% of their body weight. Additionally, they eat their own feces to recover nitrogen.

== Conservation ==
The Japanese hare population seems to be stable, though the quality or/and size of their habitat is decreasing. On a local level, they are used in hunting and specimen collecting. They are threatened by the creation of urban and industrial areas, water management systems, such as dams, hunting, trapping and invasive and non-native diseases and species. It is not known if they occur in any protected areas.

== Human interaction ==
In some places, it has become a pest. It is hunted in certain regions for food, fur, pelts, and to help curb its growing numbers.

The mythic Hare of Inaba has a place in Japanese mythology as an essential part of the legend of the Shinto god Ōkuninushi.
