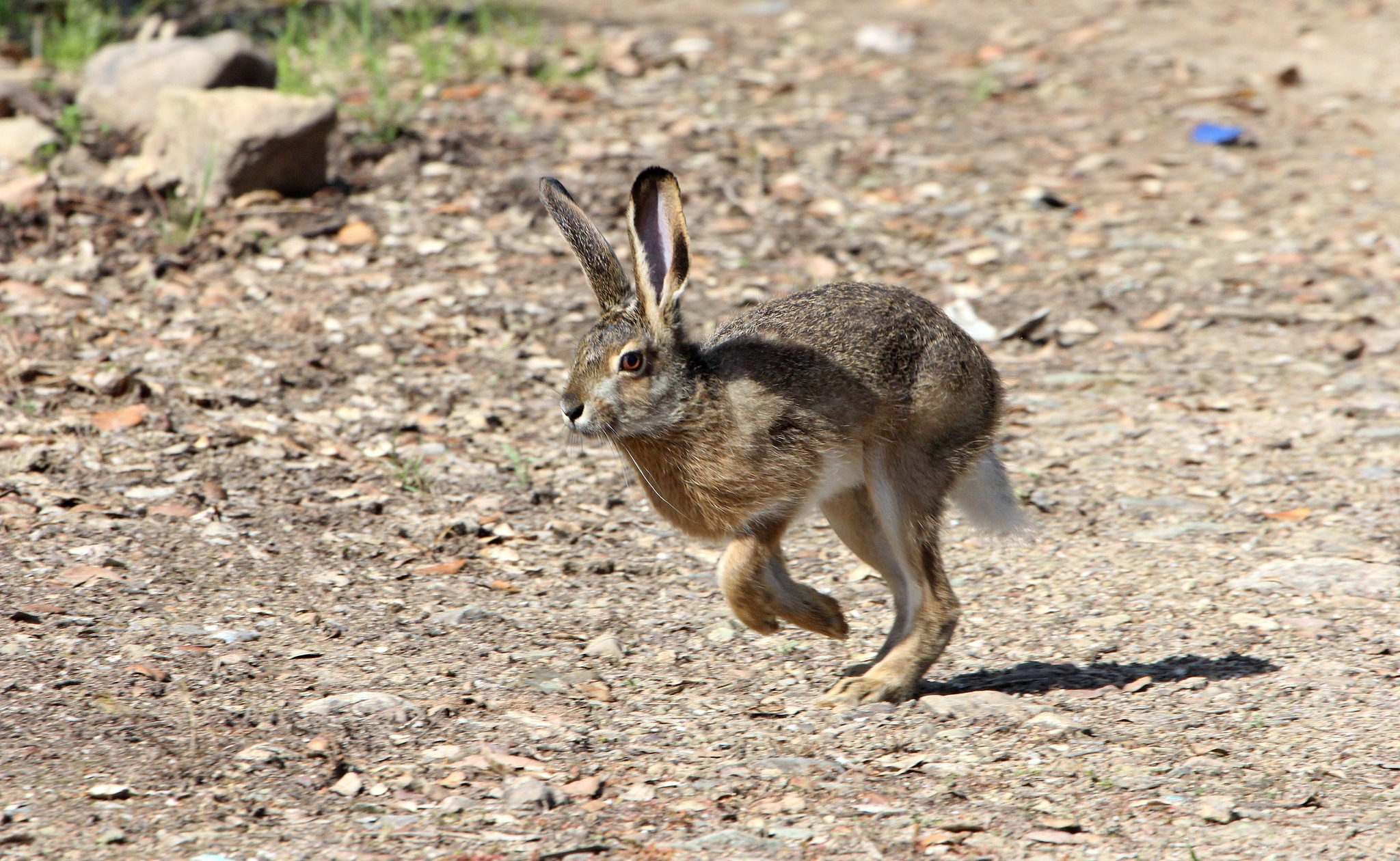
- Lepus corsicanus in France

Conservation status
- Vulnerable (IUCN 3.1)

Scientific classification
- Kingdom: Animalia
- Phylum: Chordata
- Class: Mammalia
- Order: Lagomorpha
- Family: Leporidae
- Genus: Lepus
- Species: L. corsicanus

Binomial name
- Lepus corsicanus de Winton, 1898
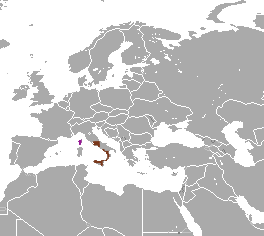
- Corsican hare range

= Corsican hare =

Species of mammal

The Corsican hare (Lepus corsicanus), also known as the Apennine hare or Italian hare, is a species of hare found in Southern Italy, Central Italy, and Corsica.

== Taxonomy ==
It was first described as a species in 1898 by the British zoologist William Edward de Winton using specimens from Corsica. It was later regarded as a subspecies of the European hare (L. europaeus) or both were treated as subspecies of the Cape hare (L. capensis). It is now often treated as a full species as it does not appear to hybridize with the European hare where their ranges overlap and studies of mitochondrial DNA suggest that it belongs to a distinct lineage which differentiated in isolated refuges during the last glacial period. It is placed in the Eulagos subgenus.

== Description ==
It is similar to the European hare in appearance, being largely brown with a cream-coloured belly. It differs in having grey rather than white bases to the hairs of the underfur. It is smaller on average than the European hare with a head and body length of 44.1–61.2 cm (17.4–24.1 in), a tail length of 6.6–11.2 cm (2.6–4.4 in) and a weight of 1.8–3.8 kg (4.0–8.4 lb). The ears and hind legs are relatively longer, 9–12.6 cm (3.5–5.0 in) and 11.4–13.5 cm (4.5–5.3 in) respectively.

== Distribution and habitat ==
It is found in maquis shrubland, grassland, cultivated areas and dunes. It is common and widespread on Sicily where it occurs from sea-level up to 2,400 metres (7,900 ft) on Mount Etna. In mainland Italy, its range is more fragmented, extending patchily north to Tuscany on the west coast and Foggia on the east coast. It was introduced to Corsica by humans, probably between the 14th and 17th centuries, and is currently rare there with only a few recent records.

== Status and conservation ==
Its population appears to be declining and it is classified as "Vulnerable" by the International Union for Conservation of Nature (IUCN). It is threatened by habitat loss, hunting and competition with European rabbits and introduced populations of European hares. It is now protected from hunting but the similarity between this species and the European hare makes protection difficult to enforce.
