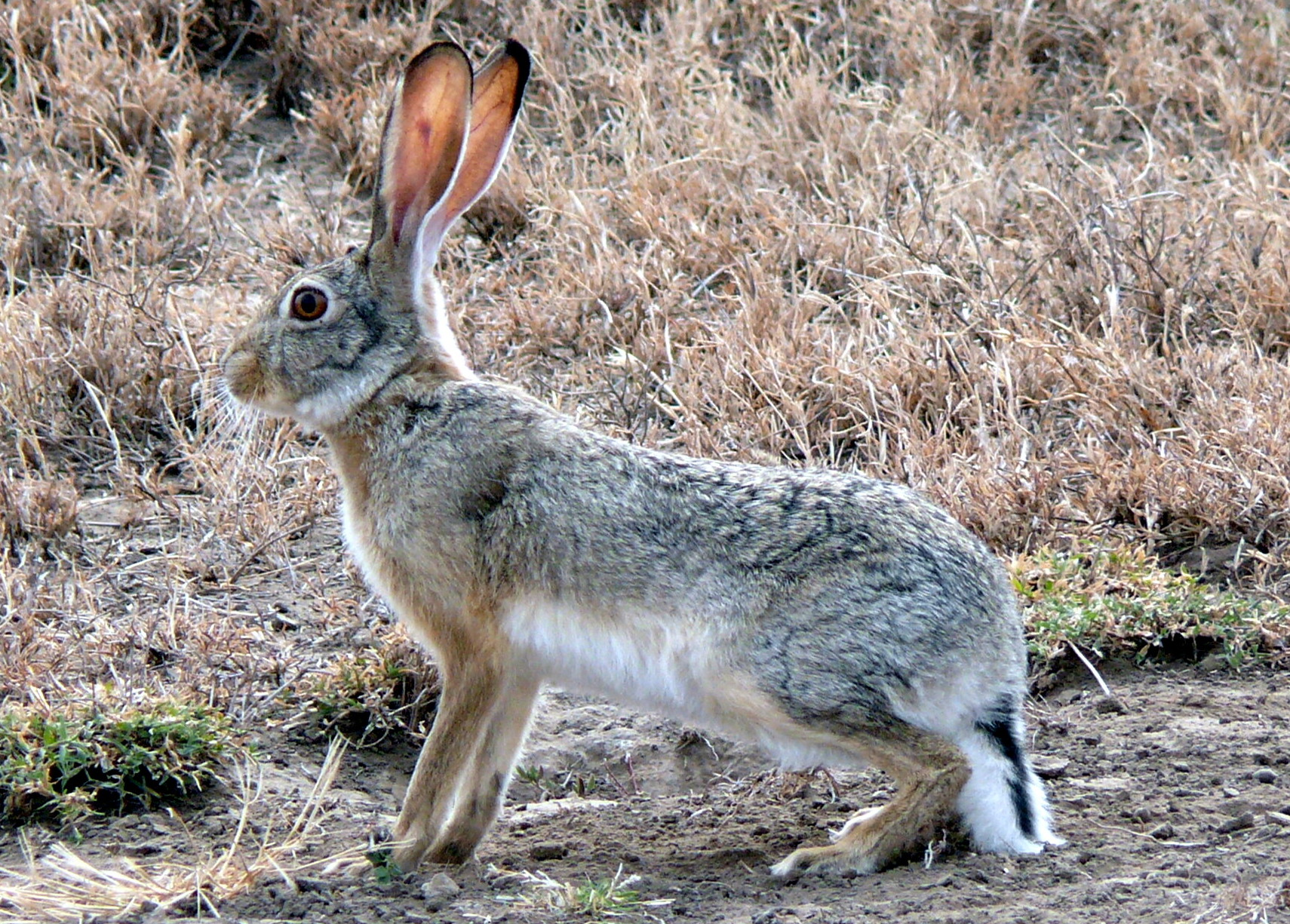

Conservation status
- Least Concern (IUCN 3.1)

Scientific classification
- Kingdom: Animalia
- Phylum: Chordata
- Class: Mammalia
- Infraclass: Placentalia
- Order: Lagomorpha
- Family: Leporidae
- Genus: Lepus
- Species: L. capensis

Binomial name
- Lepus capensis Linnaeus, 1758
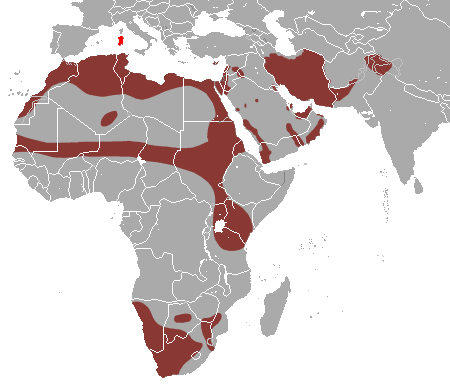
- Geographic range

= Cape hare =

Species of mammal

The Cape hare (Lepus capensis), also called the brown hare and the desert hare, is a hare native to Africa and Arabia extending into India.

== Taxonomy ==
The Cape hare was described by Carl Linnaeus in 1758 with the binomial name Lepus capensis, published in the 10th edition of Systema Naturae.

The Cape hare is part of a species complex. Lepus tolai and Lepus tibetanus were moved out based on geographic distribution and molecular characteristics. The current remaining grouping of Lepus capensis sensu lato remains paraphyletic.

As of 2005, 12 subspecies were recognised:

- Lepus capensis capensis
- Lepus capensis aquilo
- Lepus capensis carpi
- Lepus capensis granti
- Lepus capensis aegyptius
- Lepus capensis hawkeri
- Lepus capensis isabellinus
- Lepus capensis sinaiticus
- Lepus capensis arabicus
- Lepus capensis atlanticus
- Lepus capensis whitakeri
- Lepus capensis schlumbergi

== Description ==
The Cape hare is a typical hare, with well-developed legs for leaping and running, and large eyes and ears to look for threats from its environment. Usually, a white ring surrounds the eye. It has a fine, soft coat which varies in colour from light brown to reddish to sandy grey. Unusually among mammals, the female is larger than the male, an example of sexual dimorphism.

== Distribution and habitat ==
The Cape hare inhabits macchia-type vegetation, grassland, bushveld, the Sahara Desert and semi-desert areas. It is also common in parts of the Ethiopian Highlands, such as Degua Tembien.

== Behavior and ecology ==
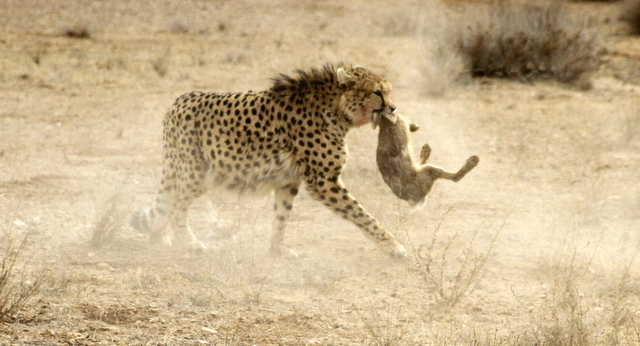
A Cape hare caught by an Asiatic cheetah in Miandasht Wildlife Refuge, Iran.

The Cape hare is a nocturnal herbivore, feeding on grass and various shrubs. Coprophagy, the consumption of an organism's own fecal material to double the amount of time food spends in the digestive tract, is a common behaviour amongst rabbits and hares. This habit allows the animal to extract the maximum nourishment from its diet, and microbes present in the pellets also provide nutrients.

After a 42-day-long pregnancy, the female gives birth to from one to three young, termed leverets, per litter and may have as many as 4 litters per year. A characteristic of hares which differentiates them from rabbits is that the young are born precocial; that is, the young are born with eyes open and are able to move about shortly after birth.

One Cape hare kept in captivity lived to nearly 9 years, but their longevity in the wild is uncertain.

== In culture ==
Cape hare in hieroglyphs
wn
wn
"Cape/desert hare" in Ancient Egyptian hieroglyphs

An example of an ancient Egyptian mummified Lepus capensis has been recorded in a tomb near Dendera. The Egyptian god Unut was a cape hare.
