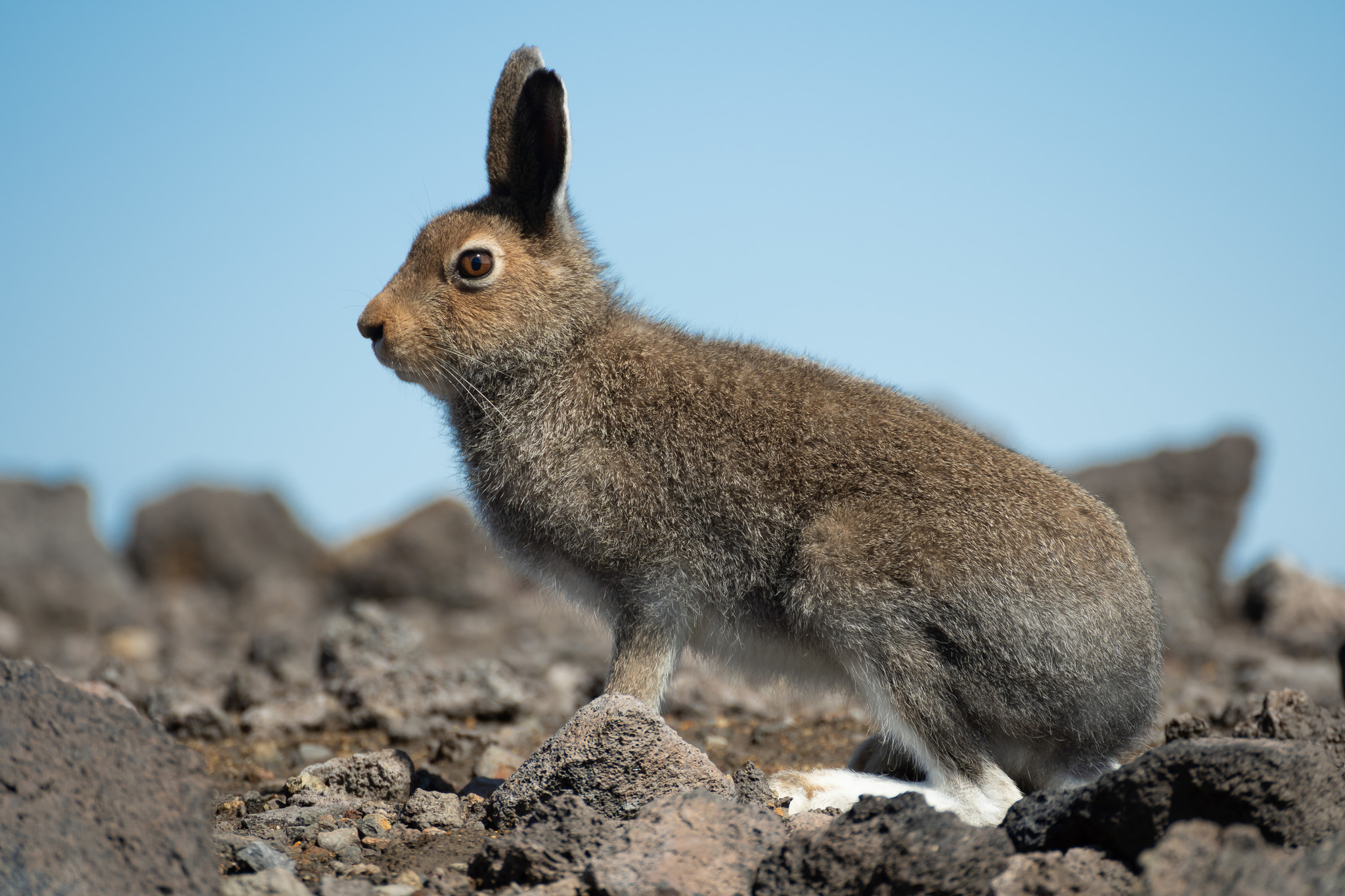
- Yelizovsky District, Russia, in summer coat

Conservation status
- Least Concern (IUCN 3.1)

Scientific classification
- Kingdom: Animalia
- Phylum: Chordata
- Class: Mammalia
- Order: Lagomorpha
- Family: Leporidae
- Genus: Lepus
- Species: L. timidus

Binomial name
- Lepus timidus Linnaeus, 1758
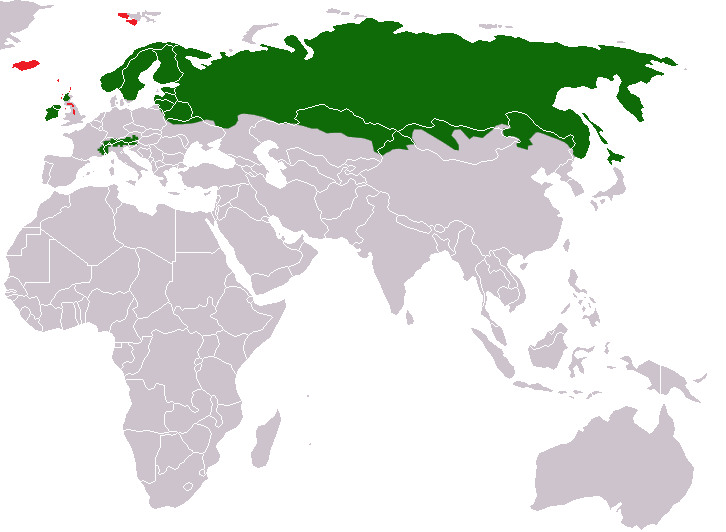
- Mountain hare range, (green : native, red : introduced)

= Mountain hare =

Mountain hare Temporal range: Late Pleistocene to recent

Species of mammal

The mountain hare or arctic hare (Lepus timidus), also known as blue hare, tundra hare, variable hare, white hare, snow hare, alpine hare, and Irish hare, is a species of hare that is largely adapted to polar and mountainous habitats in the Palearctic realm. It is a large hare, slightly smaller than the European hare and identifiable by its tail, which is completely white throughout the year. Mountain hares have a brown coat in summer and white to grey in winter. Their diet is highly adaptive to their environment, but is generally made up of plant matter such as grass, twigs, and bark.

== Taxonomy and evolution ==
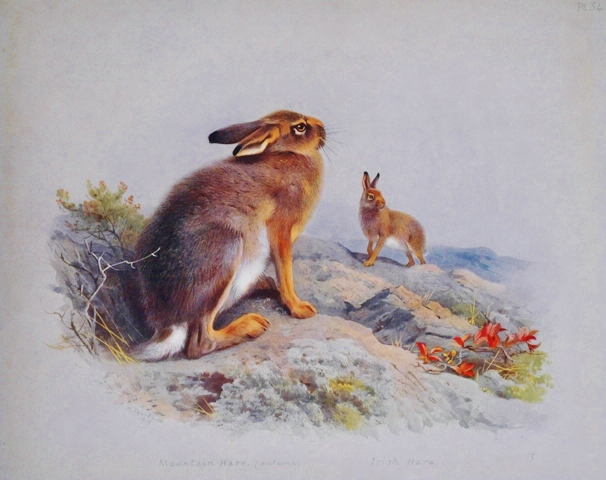
"Mountain, Irish Hare" illustration from British Mammals by A. Thorburn, 1920

The scientific name Lepus timidus was proposed by Carl Linnaeus in 1758.

The mountain hare arose during the Late Pleistocene; there is evidence that its range expanded during glaciations into southern Europe, with populations of the Iberian hare (Lepus granatensis), European hare (L. europaeus) and broom hare (L. castroviejoi) in northern Iberia harboring mitochondrial haplotypes from the mountain hare. During the Late Pleistocene to Early Holocene, the mountain hare in Russia grew at least 10% larger than other hare species today. It was therefore classified as a distinct species Lepus tanaiticus, but is now generally considered a prehistoric morphotype of the living mountain hare.

== Description ==
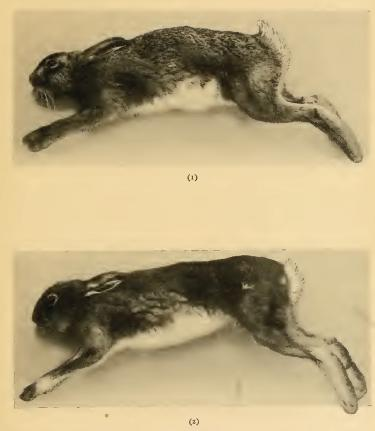
European hare (above) compared with a mountain hare

The mountain hare is a large species, though it is slightly smaller than the European hare. It grows to a length of 45–65 cm (18–26 in), with a tail of 4–8 cm (1 1/2–3 in), and a mass of 2–5.3 kg (4 1/2–11 3/4 lb), females being slightly heavier than males. They can live for up to 12 years. In summer, for all populations of mountain hares, the coat is various shades of brown. In preparation for winter most populations moult into a white (or largely white) pelage. The tail remains completely white all year round, distinguishing the mountain hare from the European hare (Lepus europaeus), which has a black upper side to the tail. The subspecies Lepus timidus hibernicus is smaller in size and stays brown all year. The Irish hare may also have a "golden" variation, particularly those found on Rathlin Island.

In the Faroe Islands, mountain hares turn grey in the winter instead of white. The winter-grey colour may be caused by downregulation of the agouti hair cycle isoform in the autumn moult.

== Distribution and habitat ==
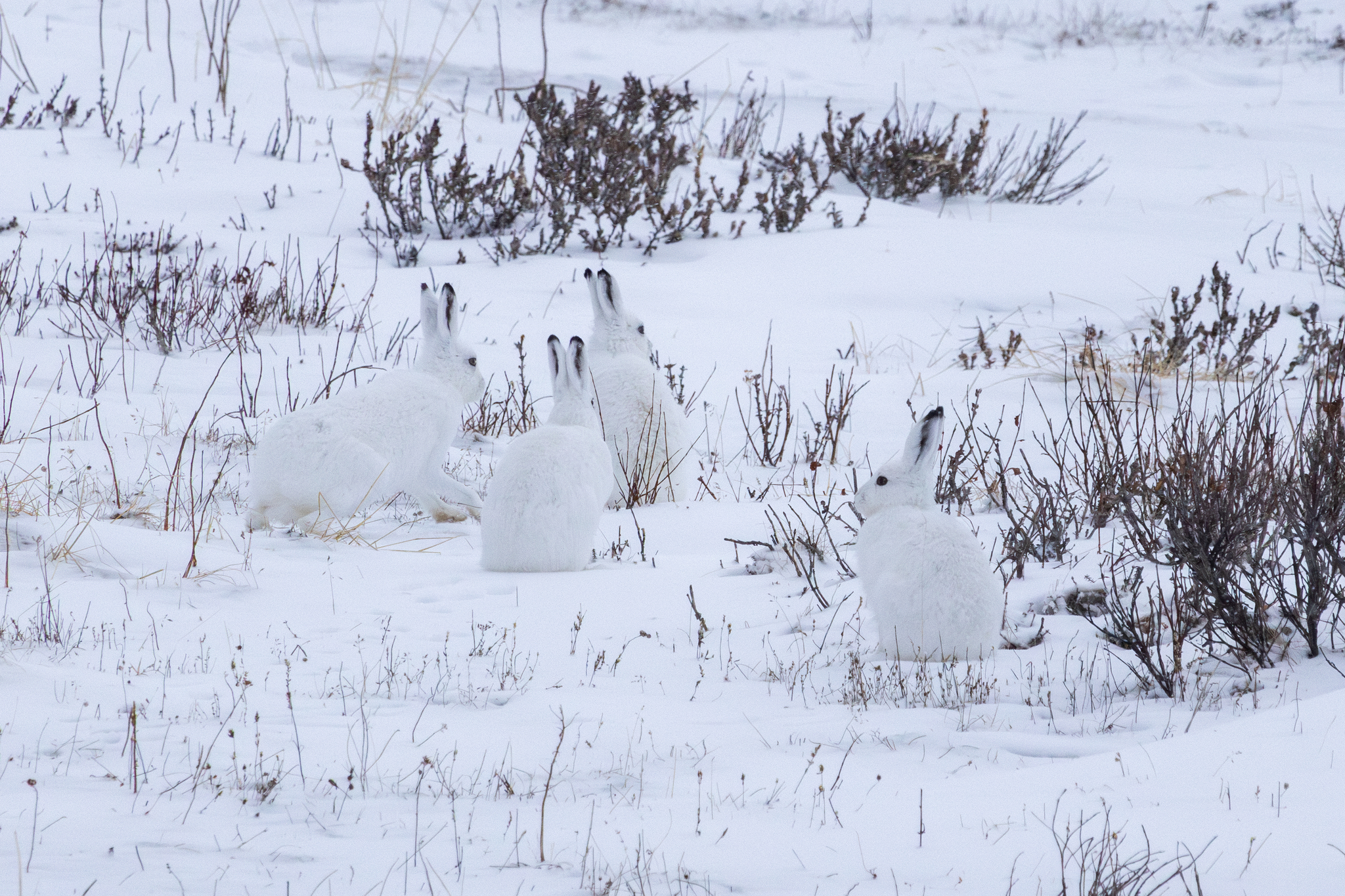
In Vadsø, Norway, a group of hares can be seen in winter coat.

The mountain hare is found within the Palearctic realm, distributed from Fennoscandia to eastern Siberia; in addition, isolated populations occur in the Alps, Scotland, the Baltics, northeastern Poland, the Kuril Islands, as well as on Sakhalin and Hokkaidō islands. In Ireland, the Irish hare (L. t. hibernicus) lives on lowland pastures, coastal grasslands, and Salt marshes, not just in the mountains. The mountain hare has also been introduced to Shetland, Orkney, the Isle of Man, the Peak District, and the Faroe Islands. Furthermore it was introduced to Svalbard, but could not establish itself there and went extinct again.

In the Alps, the mountain hare lives at elevations from 700 to 3,800 m (2,300 to 12,500 ft), depending on geographic region and season.

== Behaviour and ecology ==
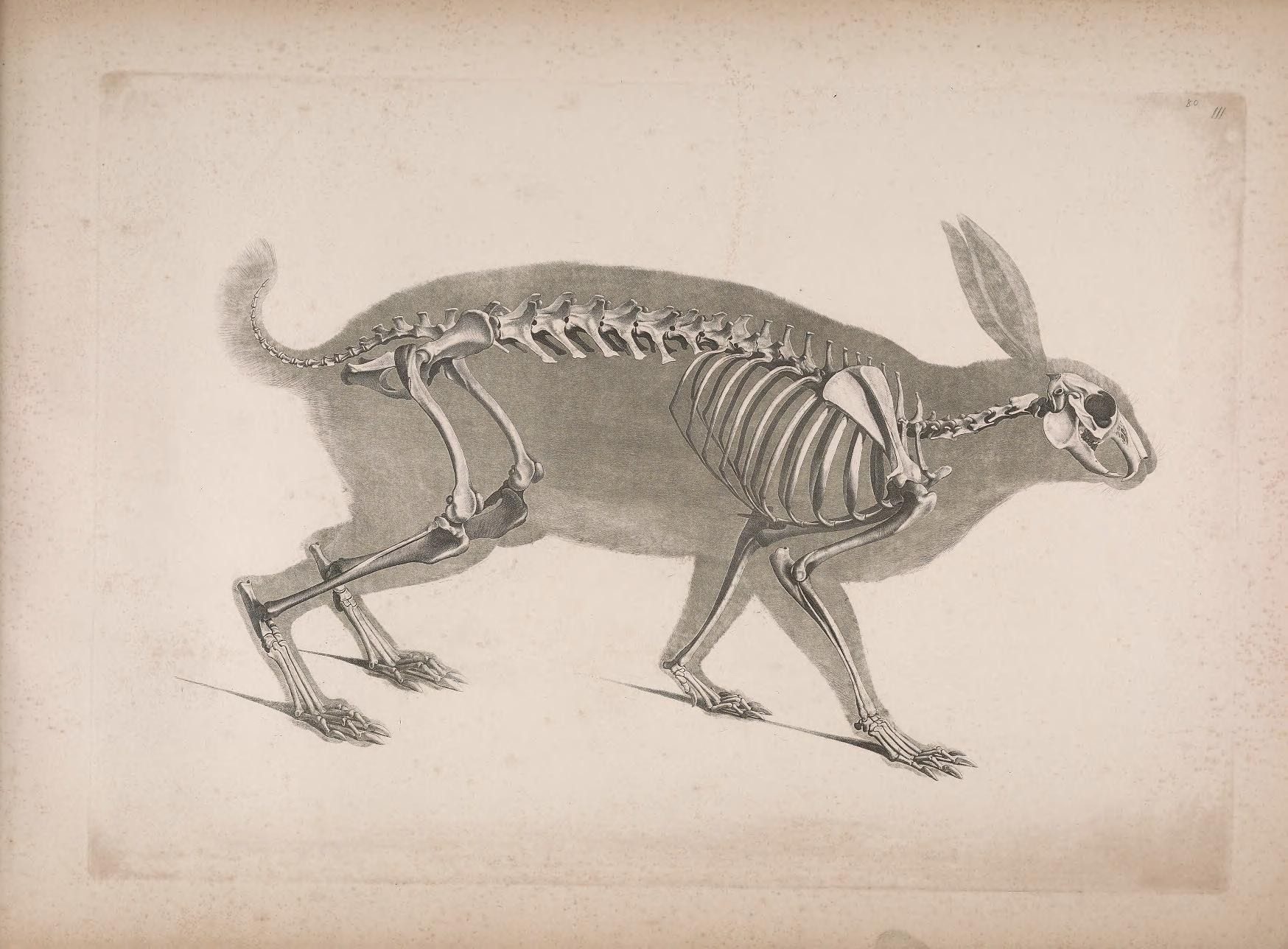
Mountain hare skeleton

The diet of the mountain hare varies from region to region, though it tends to prefer plants with high nutrient content growing in fertilized soil. Clover and grasses are preferred across much of the hare's distribution, but when snow cover restricts food availability, bark, moss, lichens and twigs many be consumed. In forested habitats, the hare eats the leaves and wood of deciduous plants, including willow, ash, birch, cottonwood, and juniper. Mountain hares prefer the dwarf willow in tundra habitats, and common heather on the islands of Sweden and in the Scottish moorlands. For mountain hares on a coastal grassland environment in Ireland, grasses constituted over 90% of their diet. This was higher than the percentage of grass in the diet of the European rabbit (Oryctolagus cuniculus) that inhabited the same environment. While female and male hares generally share the same diet, during the breeding season, females consume proportionally more grass and less heather than males do. Young hares tend to prefer eating bentgrass and avoid matgrass; these diet preferences are not seen in adult hares.

The mountain hare is regionally the favourite prey of the golden eagle and may additionally be preyed on by Eurasian eagle-owls and red foxes. The red fox is by far the most important predator of the mountain hare; as much as 90% of the fox's diet may come from this hare within its range. Pine martens, wolves, lynxes and stoats also frequently prey upon the hare in forests. Less frequent predators of the mountain hare include Arctic foxes, wolverines, Eurasian goshawks, common and rough-legged buzzards, and hen harriers.

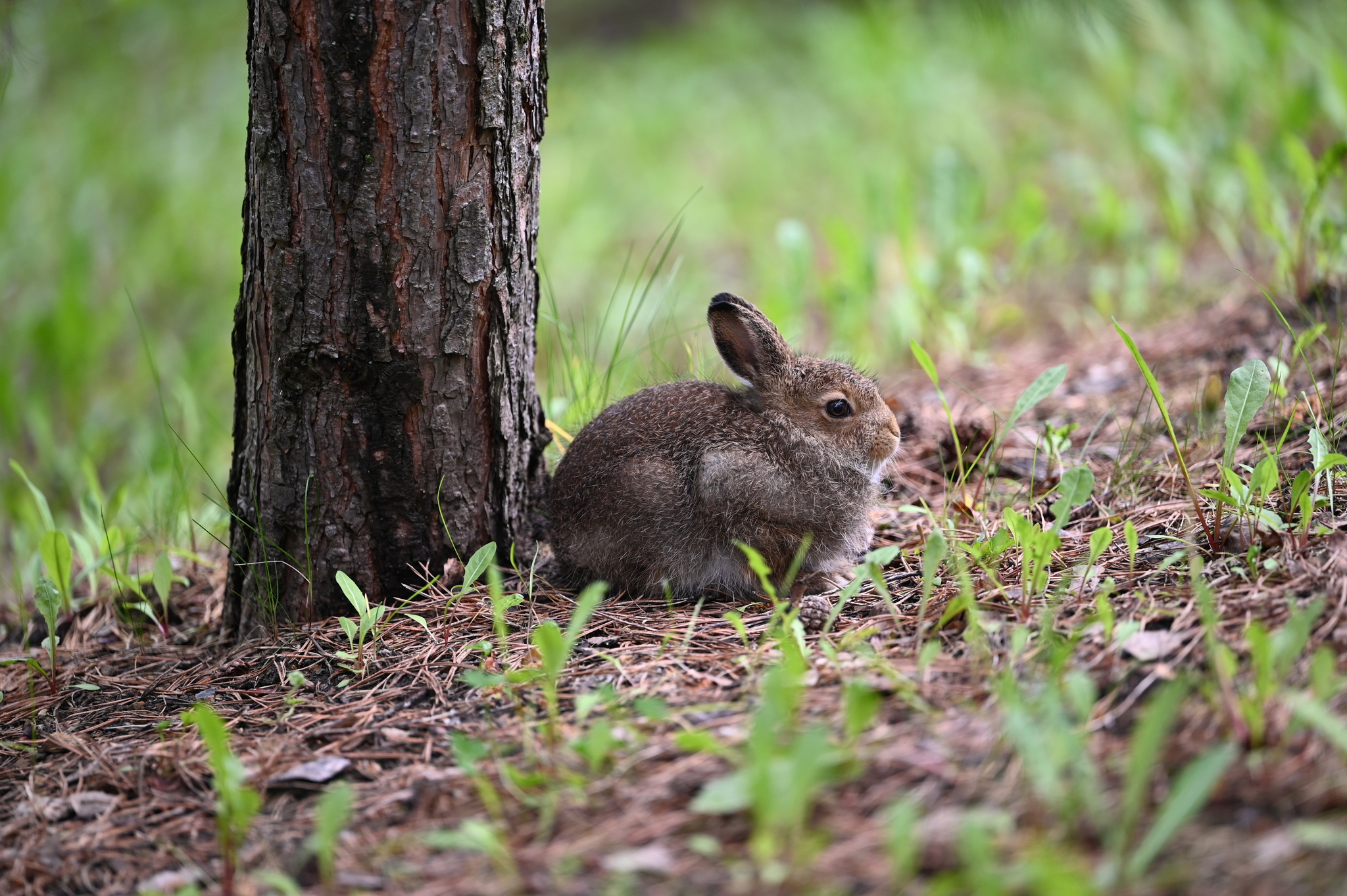
A young mountain hare in Bashkortostan, Russia

In southern parts of Finland, Norway, and Sweden, the mountain hare and the European hare compete for habitat. The European hare, being larger, is usually able to drive away the mountain hare, but is less adapted for living in snowy regions; its feet are smaller and its winter fur is a mixture of white and brown. While this winter fur is good camouflage in the coastal regions of Finland where the snow covers the shrubs only a short time, the mountain hare is better adapted for the snowier conditions of the inland areas. The two species may occasionally hybridize, which combined with a warming climate has led to a decline in the mountain hare population as compared to that of the European hare.

The Arctic hare (Lepus arcticus) was once considered a subspecies of the mountain hare, but it is now regarded as a separate species. Similarly, some scientists believe that the Irish hare should be regarded as a separate species. Fifteen subspecies are currently recognised.

== Human impact ==
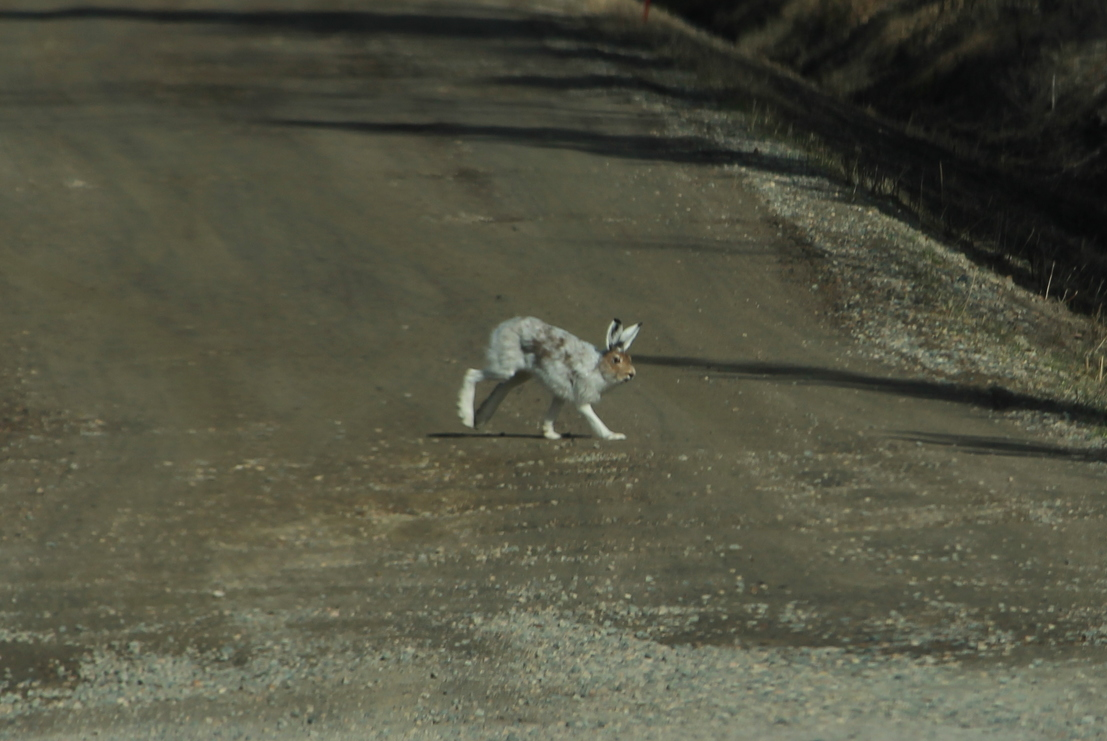
Mountain hares are seen near human settlements more often as urban centers and alpine tourism expands.

In the European Alps, the mountain hare lives at elevations from 700 to 3,800 m (2,300 to 12,500 ft), depending on biographic region and season. The development of alpine winter tourism has increased rapidly since the last few decades of the 20th century, resulting in expansion of ski resorts, growing visitor numbers, and a huge increase in all forms of snow sport activities. A 2013 study of stress and disturbance responses in mountain hares found that hares inhabiting areas with heavy winter recreation showed physiological and behavioural changes that required extra energy when snow limited their food access. It recommended ensuring that forests inhabited by mountain hares were kept free of tourist development, and that new skiing areas should be avoided in mountain hare habitat, and that existing sites should not be expanded.

In August 2016, the Scottish animal welfare charity OneKind launched a campaign on behalf of the mountain hare, as a way of raising awareness of mountain hare culls taking place across the country and in garnering public support for the issue. Mountain hares are routinely shot in the Scottish Highlands both as part of paid hunting "tours" and by gamekeepers managing red grouse populations (who believe that mountain hares can be vectors of diseases that affect the birds). Much of this activity is secretive, but investigations have revealed that tens of thousands of hares are being culled every year. The campaign, which urges people to proclaim, "We Care For The Mountain Hare", will culminate with the charity urging the Scottish government to legislate against commercial hunting and culling of the iconic Scottish species. The campaign has revealed widespread public support for a ban on hare hunting in Scotland. On May 17, 2020, MSPs voted to ban the unlicensed culling of mountain hares and grant them protected species status within Scotland after a petition started by Green MSP Alison Johnstone gathered over 22,000 signatures.

In 2021, the People's Trust for Endangered Species funded a survey of mountain hare populations in the UK's Peak District after concerns about the viability of the isolated population, believed to be as low as 2,500. The trust believes climate change is a threat to long-term survival of the Peak District population, which was introduced to the area in the 1870s.
