= Ethiopian hare =

Conservation status
- Least Concern (IUCN 3.1)

Scientific classification
- Kingdom: Animalia
- Phylum: Chordata
- Class: Mammalia
- Infraclass: Placentalia
- Order: Lagomorpha
- Family: Leporidae
- Genus: Lepus
- Species: L. fagani

Binomial name
- Lepus fagani Thomas, 1903
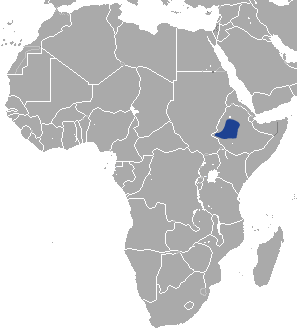
- Ethiopian hare range

Species of mammal

The Ethiopian hare (Lepus fagani) is a species of mammal in the family Leporidae. It was first described in 1903, by the British mammalogist Oldfield Thomas. The dorsal pelage is brownish buff, and is finely grizzled with black. The ventral pelage is fluffy and white in colour. Endemic to Ethiopia, it is found in the Afromontane Biozone of Ethiopia, and in the borders of the Sudanian Savanna Biozone. It is rated as a least concern species by the International Union for Conservation of Nature.

== Taxonomy ==
The Ethiopian hare is a species of the family Leporidae, and has no recognized subspecies. It belongs to the subgenus Sabanalagus. It was first described in 1903 by the British mammalogist Oldfield Thomas in the Proceedings of the Zoological Society of London. He named it Lepus fagani, after Charles E. Fagan, who was the Assistant Secretary of the British Museum of Natural History. Describing the hare's taxonomy in 1986, Derek Yalden and colleagues wrote "its nomenclatural history has been very confused".

In 1959 and 1964 respectively, Francis Petter and A. A. Gureev classified it as a subspecies of L. crawshayi, now regarded as a junior synonym of L. microtis, the African savanna hare. In 1972, Gordon Barclay Corbet and Derek Yalden suggested it might be a synonym of L. whytei, now a subspecies of L. microtis. Petter then classified it as a subspecies of the Abyssinian hare (Lepus habessinicus), in 1963. In 1987, Maria Luisa Azzaroli Puccetti reinstated its status as an independent species, because it has a uniform character throughout its distribution. It has been listed as a separate species in various works published since then. North of the Rift Valley, on the Ethiopian mountains, the population of the Ethiopian hare is geographically isolated from that of the Cape hare in the surrounding lowlands. Flux and Angermann suggested that this isolation in population probably lead to the evolution of the Ethiopian hare as a different species. In 1990, Flux and Angermann wrote it is "probably" a subspecies of the African savanna hare or of the scrub hare (Lepus saxatilis). It is usually considered to be a part of the African savanna hare-scrub hare complex. The Kingdon Field Guide to African Mammals also treats it as a subspecies of the Cape hare (Lepus capensis). A genetic study suggests that the Ethiopian hare recently descended from the Abyssinian hare.

Its chromosome number is likely the same as other species of its genus. The holotype was collected by Edward Degen and its type locality is the Zege Peninsula, Lake Tana, Ethiopia at an elevation of 4,000 ft (1,200 m). (Note: Thomas wrote it as: "Zegi, Lake Tsana".)

== Description ==
Ethiopian hare
- An observation of the Ethiopian hare

The Ethiopian hare is a medium-sized, dark coloured hare, which measures 45 to 54 cm (18 to 21 in) in length. It has a medium-sized, 5 to 8.2 cm (2.0 to 3.2 in) long, fluffy tail which is buff-white below, black above, and buff coloured at the sides. The skull measures 8.33 to 9 cm (3.28 to 3.54 in) in length. The supraorbital wings are weak and small. The anterior shoulders of the cheek bone are large. It has long, dense, coarse pelage. The dorsal hairs are 2 to 2.5 cm (0.79 to 0.98 in) long. They are brownish buff, and are finely grizzled with black. The fur is pale grey at the base, and have buff terminal bands, whitish subterminal bands, and generally black tips. The underfur is whitish grey. The head is darker than the dorsal pelage, and the crown (top of the head) is blacker. The chin, belly, and throat are white. It has grey below the chin. The ventral pelage is fluffy and white in colour. The upperparts are buff ochraceous brown. The colour of the chest and the nape (back of the neck) are tawny. The rich cinnamon-ginger colour of the nuchal patch, extends on to the neck-sides. The ears are medium-sized, buff coloured, and measure 8.1 to 9.5 cm (3.2 to 3.7 in) in length. The lower outer-margins of the ears have buff or white fringe, the upper outer-margins have buff fringe, and the inner surfaces of the tip of the ears have narrow, black rims. The principal incisor teeth have deep grooves filled completely with cement. The dorsal parts of the upper incisor teeth are sloped laterally, forming an angled anterior surface. The forefeet are cinnamon-brown and have blackish brown furs at the soles. The hindfeet are white below, brownish buff above, and measure 9 to 11 cm (3.5 to 4.3 in) in length. The soles of the hindfeet have ginger-brown or blackish brown fur.

The Abyssinian hare is similar to the Ethiopian hare, but it has soft dorsal pelage, longer ears, and a longer tail. The Ethiopian highland hare (Lepus starcki) is also a similar species, but it has longer ears, a longer tail, and its grooves of the principal upper incisor teeth are not filled with cement. The Cape hare is also similar to the Ethiopian hare, but has longer ears, grizzled-greyish pelage, and brownish pink nuchal patch.

== Distribution and habitat ==
The Ethiopian hare is endemic to Africa, and is found in the Afromontane Biozone of Ethiopia, and in the borders of the Sudanian Savanna Biozone; it also occurs west of the Rift Valley, in the Ethiopian Highlands, and abundantly found around the Lake Tana in Ethiopia. It has also been possibly recorded in southeastern Sudan and in extreme northwestern Kenya.

It has taken over the habitat that was occupied by the Abyssinian hare. It inhabits grasslands, steppes, grassy parts of forests, and forest peripheries. It prefers a relatively less open habitat than that of the Abyssinian hare, and similar to the preference by the African savanna hare in Kenya. It is found at elevations of 500 to 2,500 m (1,600 to 8,200 ft) above sea level. Its distribution is allopatric or parapatric with that of the African savanna hare.

== Behaviour and ecology ==
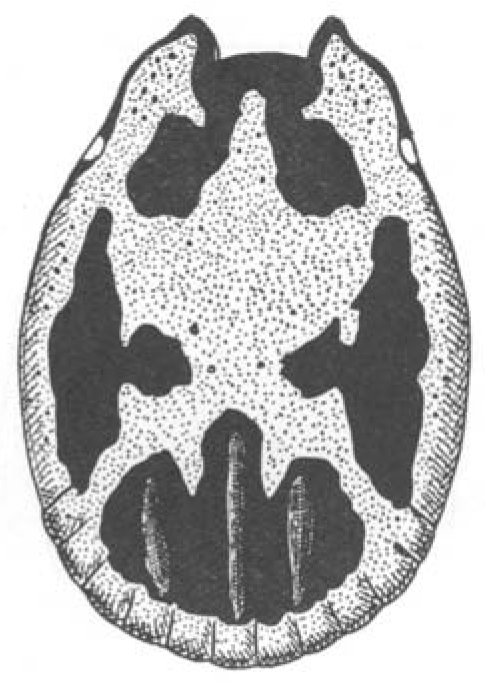
Ornamentation of a male R. pulchellus, a tick known to feed on Ethiopian hares.

No data regarding its behaviour, ecology, or reproduction has been recorded. The spotted hyena (Crocuta crocuta) is a predator of the Ethiopian hare. The tick Rhipicephalus pulchellus has been observed parasitizing the Ethiopian hare.

== Status and conservation ==
Since 1996, the status of the Ethiopian hare has been data deficient on the IUCN Red List of Endangered Species. This is because even though it is widespread species, very little is known about its status and ecology. The current state of its population trend is unclear. There are no known threats to the species. It occurs in the Abijatta-Shalla National Park and the Gambella National Park. It is currently rated as a least concern species by the International Union for Conservation of Nature since 2019.
