= March Hare (disambiguation) =

The March Hare is a character in Lewis Carroll's Alice's Adventures in Wonderland.

March Hare or The March Hare may also refer to:

- March Hare (band), featuring Stuart Leathwood of The Koobas
- March Hare (festival), a Canadian poetry festival
- The March Hare (1919 film), a British silent comedy film
- The March Hare (1921 film), a lost American silent film
- The March Hare (1956 film), a British comedy film
- March Hare, a fictional airbase in the film The Sky Crawlers

== See also ==
- Mad as a March hare, an English idiomatic phrase
- Hares, the animal species called March Hares during the month of March
