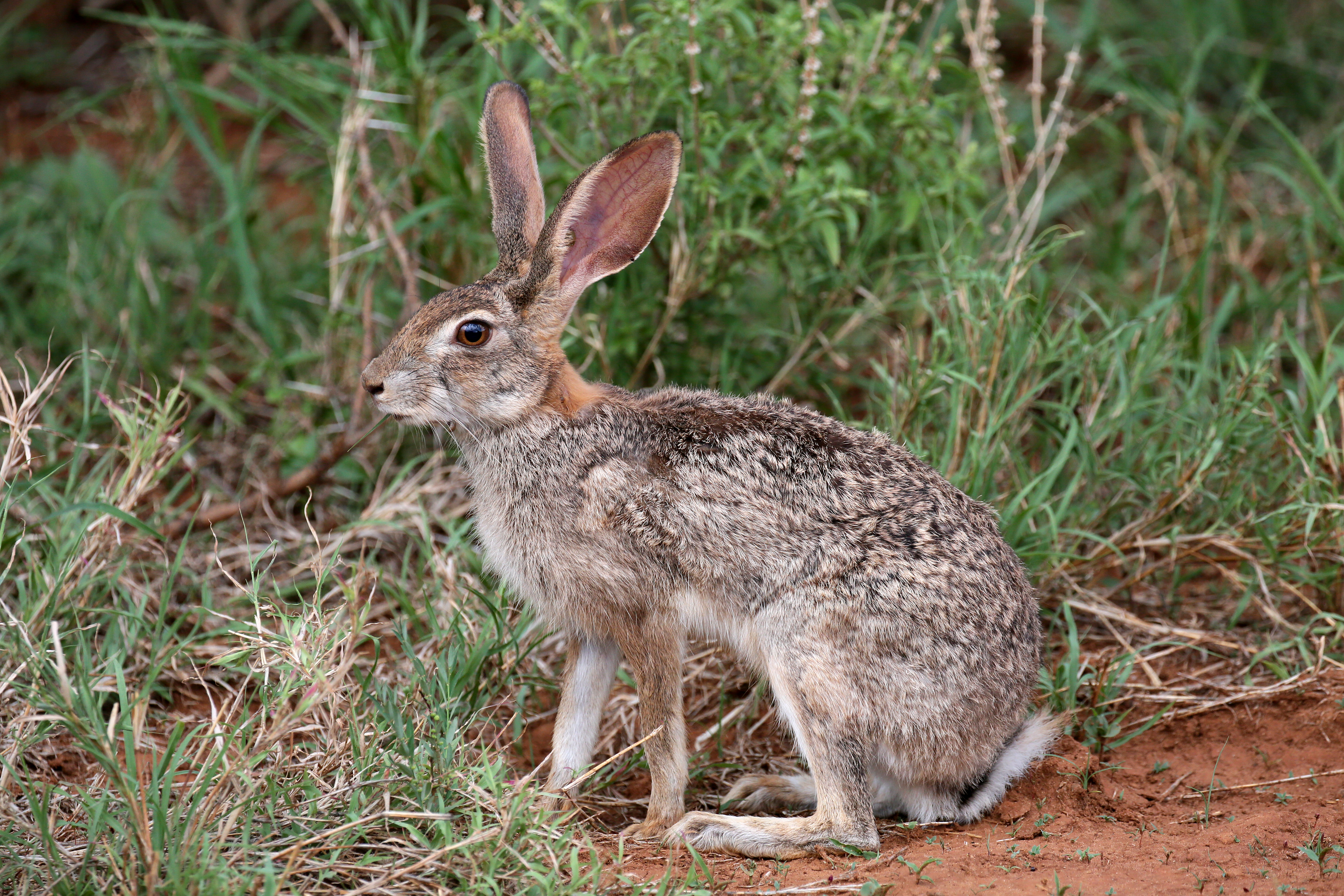
- Madikwe Game Reserve, South Africa

Conservation status
- Least Concern (IUCN 3.1)

Scientific classification
- Kingdom: Animalia
- Phylum: Chordata
- Class: Mammalia
- Order: Lagomorpha
- Family: Leporidae
- Genus: Lepus
- Species: L. saxatilis

Binomial name
- Lepus saxatilis F. Cuvier, 1823
- range

Synonyms
- List: Lepus timidus A. Smith, 1826; Lepus rufinucha A. Smith, 18291; Lepus longicaudatus J. E. Gray, 1837; Lepus fumigatus J. A. Wagner, 1844; Lepus grayi Fitzinger, 1867; Lepus zuluensis subrufus A. Roberts, 1913; Lepus gungunyanae A. Roberts, 1914; Lepus zuluensis damarensis A. Roberts, 1926

= Cape scrub hare =

Species of mammal

The Cape scrub hare (Lepus saxatilis) (Afrikaans: ribbokhaas) is a species of hare found in South Africa and Namibia. It is a medium to large-sized hare with coarse grizzled-gray fur along most of its body, white undersides, a black and white tail, and black-tipped ears. The hare's eyes are ringed with white. It is similar in appearance to the smaller African savanna hare, a species found in a broader range across Africa. The Cape scrub hare is largely restricted to savanna, woodland, and scrubland habitats, though it is found at the borders or ecotones of some forest and mountain habitats. It is fairly adaptable, able to inhabit regions where agriculture has modified the land.

The International Union for Conservation of Nature considers the Cape scrub hare to be a least-concern species, as it is fairly common and appears in several protected areas. However, its population has been declining, and is expected to decrease by 20% over the next 100 years, according to a 2004 report. Some populations are becoming fragmented due to agricultural development; the hare is also threatened by hunting for food and use in traditional medicine.

== Taxonomy ==
The French zoologist Frédéric Cuvier wrote the first species description of the Cape scrub hare, also known as the scrub hare or savanna hare, in 1823. He placed its type locality as the Cape of Good Hope, South Africa. It was one of two hares (species in the genus Lepus) known at the time to inhabit South Africa, with the other being the Cape hare (L. capensis). Its taxonomy has since been confused, especially in the region south of the Cunene and Zambezi rivers. The species referred to as the Cape scrub hare is considered to have diverged from the African savanna hare (L. victoriae) fairly recently, but further clarifications on the species' taxonomy requires study of other African hare populations. Populations of Cape hare found in Sardinia and coastal North Africa were found to be more closely related to the Cape scrub hare and the European hare (L. europaeus) than they were to other Cape hares in southern Africa based on phylogenetic analysis. These related hares have been considered part of the Mediterranean hare species, described in the 19th century by Johann Andreas Wagner but only reestablished as separate from the Cape hare in 2019.

According to DNA analysis performed in 2024 by Leandro Iraçabal and colleagues, the Moroccan hare (Lepus schlumbergeri) and the African savanna hare are the closest relatives of the Cape scrub hare:

- Lagomorphs
  - - - Lepus saxatilis
      - - Lepus schlumbergeri
        - Lepus victoriae
    - Other hares
  - Rabbits and pikas

== Description ==
The Cape scrub hare is a medium to large-sized hare with long, broad ears measuring from 10 to 15 centimetres (3.9 to 5.9 inches). It has an adult head and body length of 45 to 63 cm (18 to 25 in). Similar to the African savanna hare though somewhat larger, the Cape scrub hare is a grizzled gray coarse-furred hare. Its undersides are gray, and the inside of the limbs, the chin, and chest are white. Fur becomes sparse along the ears, which are black at the tips. Its tail is black on top and white below, and measures 13 to 15 centimetres (5.1 to 5.9 in) in length. An off-white ring encircles the Cape scrub hare's eyes. Adults weigh from 3.2 to 4 kilograms (7.1 to 8.8 lb), with females being generally heavier than males.

There are two notable diagnostic features of the Cape scrub hare's skeleton. One is the ratio of its hard palate length to the total length of its skull, referred to as the mesopterygoid space. This ratio is used to distinguish specimens of the Cape scrub hare from the Cape hare and other nearby African hares. The other is a simple groove in the enamel of its incisors, which is not present in the African savannah hare. Like other hares and rabbits, it has a dental formula of 2.0.3.31.0.2.3 × 2 = 28, indicating that it has two pairs of upper and one pair of lower incisors, no canines, three upper and two lower premolars on each side, and three upper and lower molars on either side of the jaw.

== Habitat and distribution ==
The Cape scrub hare is endemic to southern Africa, and lives in southwestern Namibia and the Western Cape and Northern Cape provinces of South Africa. Its presence in Namibia and absence in southeastern parts of Africa is based on taxonomic restrictions imposed on the species in 2018.

This hare prefers savanna woodland and scrub habitats, residing in areas with grassy vegetation that it uses for shelter. It can adapt to regions where agricultural development has encroached on its habitat. It is not seen in forests, deserts, or open grasslands, but it may be found at the ecotones of forests and mountainous regions.

== Ecology and behavior ==
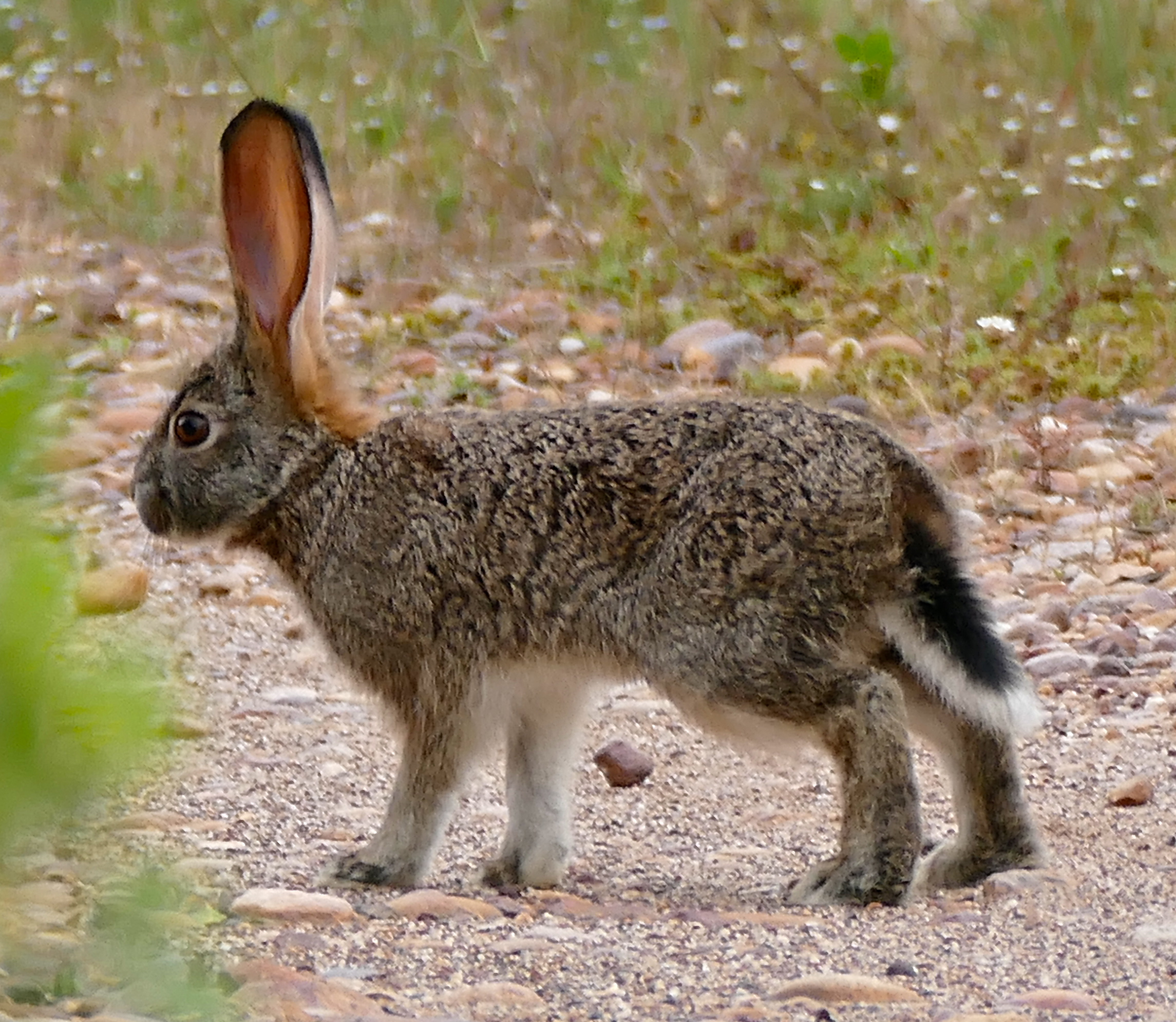
A young Cape scrub hare seen in Bontebok National Park, Western Cape, South Africa

The Cape scrub hare is solitary and herbivorous. It is sometimes found in male-female pairs, particularly while the female is in estrus. There is no defined breeding season in this hare, though females typically produce three young every summer. Gestation takes 5 to 6 weeks. The average newborn weighs 98 grams (0.216 pounds). The species' reproduction has not been studied, and much information is known from casual observation.

The Cape scrub hare is a herbivore and eats mostly green grasses, consuming their leaves, stems, and rhizomes. Green grass is preferred over dry grass. Peanuts are sometimes consumed. It is nocturnal, and forages from dusk through the rest of the night.

Some ixodid ticks are known to affect Cape scrub hares. Predators of South African hares include martial eagles, Verraux's eagles, black-backed jackals, and Cape foxes.

== Human interaction ==
Cape scrub hares are among several mammal species that are used in traditional medicine in South Africa. The species' habitat is becoming fragmented due to ongoing agricultural development, and hunting is a threat to South African populations. These same threats are thought to be of concern in Western Cape in particular, though there is not enough monitoring data to support this.

=== Conservation status ===
As of 2019, the Cape scrub hare is listed as a least-concern species by the International Union for Conservation of Nature, though its population is decreasing. It has a fairly restricted distribution. A 2004 study estimated that within the next 100 years, their population is estimated to decrease by 20%, but this rate of decline is not enough to consider the species as threatened. The species is generally considered common where it occurs in South Africa, and it occurs in several protected areas.
