= Carl Lundgren =

American athlete and coach (1880–1934)

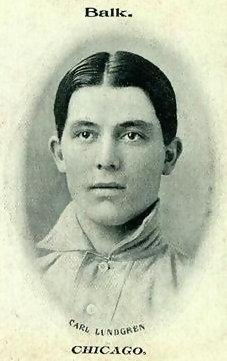
- 1906 baseball card of Lundgren
- Pitcher
- Born: February 16, 1880; Marengo, Illinois, U.S.
- Died: August 21, 1934 (aged 54); Marengo, Illinois, U.S.
- Batted: Right Threw: Right

MLB debut
- June 19, 1902, for the Chicago Orphans

Last MLB appearance
- April 23, 1909, for the Chicago Cubs

MLB statistics
- Win–loss record: 91–55
- Earned run average: 2.42
- Strikeouts: 535
- Stats at Baseball Reference

Teams
- Chicago Orphans/Cubs (1902–1909)

Career highlights and awards
- 2× World Series champion (1907, 1908)

Carl Leonard "Lundy" Lundgren (February 16, 1880 – August 21, 1934) was an American baseball and football player and coach.

Lundgren played football and baseball for the University of Illinois Urbana–Champaign and played eight seasons of Major League Baseball as a pitcher for the Chicago Cubs. In eight years with the Cubs, he compiled a record of 91 wins and 55 losses. His best season was 1907 when he won 18 games, pitched 207 innings without allowing a home run, threw seven shutouts, and gave up only 27 earned runs in 28 games. His 1.17 earned run average was the second lowest in the major leagues, and his average of 5.652 hits allowed per nine innings was the lowest in the major leagues.

Control problems held him back from greater renown. The Atlanta Constitution in 1913 summarized Lundgren's strengths and weaknesses: "He had everything including speed to burn green hickory and an assortment of curves that would keep a criptograph specialist figuring all night but he was wild as a March hare in a cyclone and couldn't locate the plate with a field glass."

After retiring as a player, Lundgren became a coach. He was the head baseball coach and assistant football coach at the University of Michigan from 1914 to 1921. He was the head baseball coach and assistant athletic director at the University of Illinois from 1921 until his death in 1934. Lundgren's baseball teams at Michigan and Illinois won eight Big Ten Conference baseball championships, a total exceeded by only three other coaches in Big Ten history.

== Early years ==
Lundgren was born in Marengo, Illinois in 1880. His father, Pehr Hjalmar Lundgren, was born in Östergötland, Sweden, emigrated to the United States in 1868 and worked as a house painter, contractor and interior decorator. His mother, Delilah (Renwick) Lundgren, was born on a farm outside Marengo. His father purchased a farm north of Marengo, where the family lived until 1900. Lundgren graduated from Marengo High School in 1898. He was the oldest of four children, having a younger brother, Franz Emil, and two younger sisters, Eva and Alma.

== University of Illinois ==
Lundgren enrolled at the University of Illinois Urbana–Champaign in 1898, studied civil engineering, and graduated in 1902. As a senior, he published a paper titled, "Comparative strength of gravel and broken-stone concretes". While at Illinois, he played at the halfback and fullback positions for the Illini football team for three years. He was also a pitcher for the Illini baseball team from 1899 to 1902 and was the team captain in 1902.

== Chicago Cubs ==
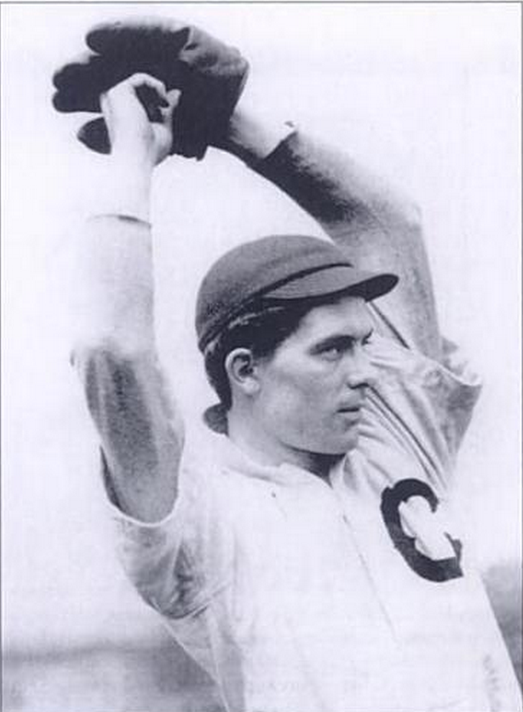
Lundgren with the Cubs

The Chicago Cubs saw Lundgren pitch in an exhibition game between the Illinois college team and the Cubs. The Cubs gave Lundgren a tryout, and he made his major league debut for the Cubs on June 19, 1902, shortly after completing his studies at the University of Illinois. One sports writer noted that "the Cubs had a new pitcher, and the world lost a civil engineer." In his rookie season, Lundgren pitched 17 complete games (in 18 appearances) and had an earned run average of 1.97.

Lundgren pitched for the Cubs from 1902 to 1909 and compiled a 91–55 (.623) record and career earned run average of 2.42. During his best years, from 1904 to 1907, he compiled a record of 65–27. The Cubs won three straight pennants in 1906, 1907, and 1908 and World Series championships in 1907 and 1908. During the 1906 and 1907 seasons, Lundgren compiled records of 17–6 and 18–7.

In 1907, Lundgren pitched 207 innings without allowing a home run, threw seven shutouts, and gave up only 27 earned runs in 28 games. His 1.17 earned run average was the second lowest in the major leagues (trailing teammate Jack Pfiester who had a 1.15 earned run average), and his average of 5.652 hits allowed per nine innings was the lowest in the major leagues. However, he did not pitch in any of the Cubs' World Series games.

His earned run average jumped from 1.17 in 1907 to 4.22 in 1908. He appeared in only two games for the Cubs in 1909, pitching his last major league game on April 23. At the end of April 1909, the Cubs placed Lundgren on waivers for a price of $1.50.

Lundgren's biggest weakness as a pitcher was lack of control. Even in 1907, his best year, Lundgren averaged 4.0 walks per nine innings pitched. In 1909, he averaged 8.3 walks per nine innings before being released. A profile of Lundgren published in 1913 by The Atlanta Constitution discussed his strengths and weaknesses:

"He had everything including speed to burn green hickory and an assortment of curves that would keep a criptograph specialist figuring all night but he was wild as a March hare in a cyclone and couldn't locate the plate with a field glass. ... He had a strange hold on the art of steering the ball away from the plate that would make Wild Willie Donovan and Cy Seymour look like a brace of pikers who had been touched for their meal tickets."

Lundgren was called "the best cold-weather pitcher in the profession" by the Reach Baseball Guide. He developed a reputation for pitching well in the spring and fall, but not faring as well during the hot summer months.

While pitching for the Cubs, he worked in the off-season as a draftsman from 1902 to 1904 and as a dairy farmer after 1904.

In the summer of 1909, Lundgren appealed from a decision by the Cubs management to deny him a share of the team's $10,000 World Series bonus for 1908. In June 1909, he won what was described as "a moral victory" when a non-binding decision was entered, declaring the exclusion of Lundgren to be unjust.

== Minor leagues ==
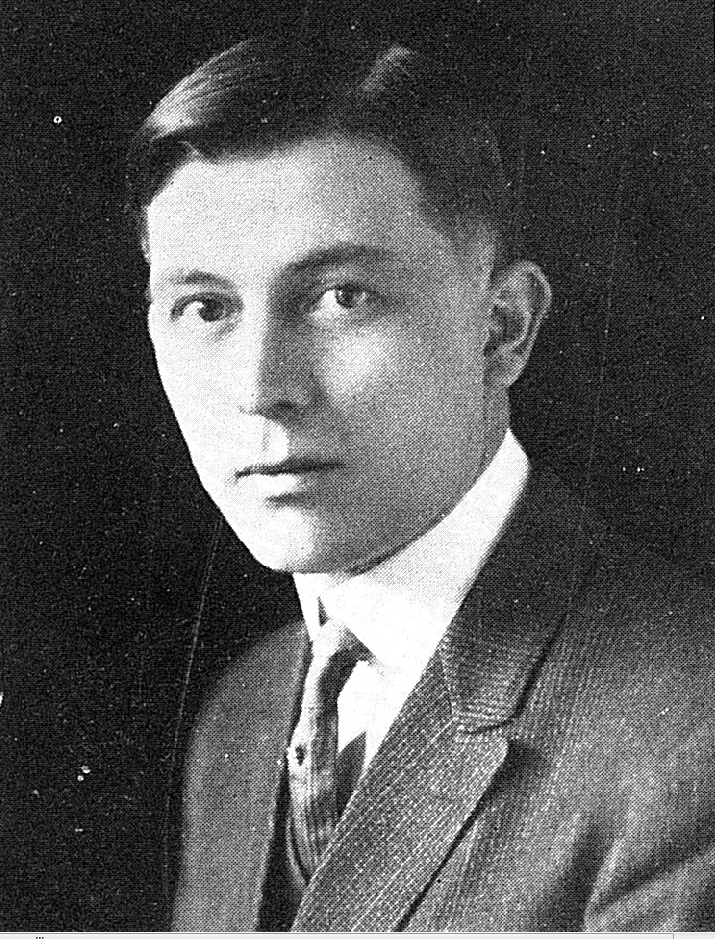
Lundgren, 1919

After his major league career ended in April 1909, Lundgren played minor league baseball for several years. In the spring of 1909, several teams expressed interest in Lundgren. Bill Armour, manager of the Toledo, Ohio team, reportedly lost interest because of Lundgren's reputation as a cold-weather pitcher: "Armour, however, discovered that Lundgren is a good man in the spring and fall, but during the hot months, when his services would be most in demand, he is unable to stand the strain."

The Cubs sold Lundgren to Brooklyn, and Brooklyn farmed him out to the Toronto Maple Leafs in the Eastern League for the 1909 season. However, he was suspended in June 1909 by Toronto manager Joe Kelley. A newspaper account on the suspension noted: "Lundgren is not in shape for a hard game, and the Toronto Club does not intend to pay him a big salary to get into shape when he's not half trying." In August 1909, he was reported to be "pitching independent ball around Chicago."

During the 1910 season, he played for the Hartford Senators in the Connecticut State League, compiling a record of 6–3. At the end of the 1910 season, The Hartford Courant wrote: "Lundgren was regarded as the ablest pitcher in this league last season and he outclassed the other boxmen." Lungren also played for the Toronto Maple Leafs in 1910, compiling a 1–4 record. In November 1910, he was sold to Topeka in the Western League.

In 1911, he played for the Troy Trojans in the New York State League, compiling a 13–12 record in 31 games. He ended his playing career in 1912 with the Hartford Senators, compiling a record of 6–3 in 16 games. In what appears to have been Lundgren's last professional baseball game, he pitched a shutout against the Bridgeport Orators on September 10, 1912.

There were newspaper reports in June 1913 indicating that Lundgren had a tryout with the Mobile team in the Southern League and that he had signed with the Atlanta Crackers or the Charleston Sea Gulls, but no record has been found of his playing for those teams.

== Coaching career ==
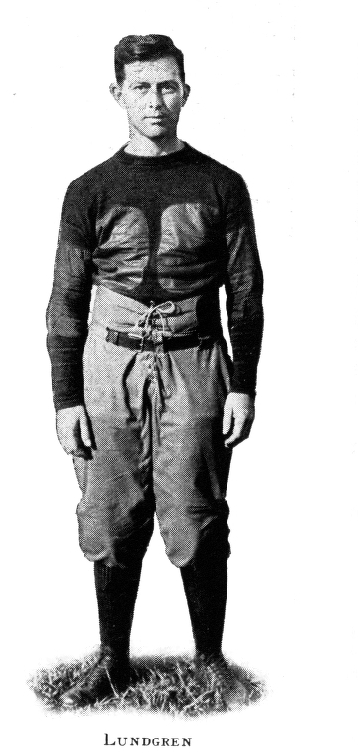
Lundgren as assistant football coach, 1919

In March 1912, Lundgren was hired to assist Boileryard Clarke in coaching the pitchers at Princeton University in 1912. After a short stint with Princeton, Lundgren returned to the field as a player with Hartford in June 1912. In January 1913, the University of Iowa expressed interest in hiring Lundgren as its baseball coach, but it appears that the deal fell through after the Iowa Board of Athletics was asked to meet his salary demands. In February 1913, he was also interviewed, but not hired, for the position of manager of a baseball team in Keokuk, Iowa.

In August 1913, he was hired by the University of Michigan to succeed Branch Rickey as the head coach of the Michigan Wolverines baseball team. He was the baseball coach at Michigan from 1914 through 1920, compiling a record of 93–43–6. Lundgren developed several major league players at Michigan, including George Sisler, who became one of baseball's greatest players. He was also an assistant football coach at Michigan under the legendary football coach, Fielding H. Yost. In his final three years at Michigan (1918–1920), Lundgren's baseball teams won consecutive Big Ten Conference championships with records of 9–1, 9–0 and 9–1 in conference play. While coaching at Michigan, Lundgren worked in the off-season as a traveling salesman.

In June 1920, Lundgren left Michigan to become the baseball coach at his alma mater, the University of Illinois. He was Illinois' baseball coach for 14 years until his death in 1934. His Illini teams won Big Ten championships in 5 of Lundgren's 14 years as coach and tied for another. Lundgren also served as the assistant athletic director at Illinois under George Huff.

Lundgren's Michigan and Illinois baseball teams won eight Big Ten Conference baseball championships. Only three coaches have won more Big Ten baseball championships—George Huff of Illinois, Dick Siebert of Minnesota, and John Anderson of Minnesota.

== Personal life ==
Lundgren married S. Maude Cohoon in September 1904. He died in August 1934 of a heart attack at age 54. A historic marker has been placed in Marengo, Illinois commemorating his life and baseball career.

== See also ==
- List of Major League Baseball career ERA leaders
- List of Major League Baseball annual saves leaders
