= Leptopelis yaldeni =

Conservation status
- Vulnerable (IUCN 3.1)

Scientific classification
- Kingdom: Animalia
- Phylum: Chordata
- Class: Amphibia
- Order: Anura
- Family: Arthroleptidae
- Genus: Leptopelis
- Species: L. yaldeni

Binomial name
- Leptopelis yaldeni Largen, 1977

Species of frog in the family Arthroleptidae

Leptopelis yaldeni is a species of frog in the family Arthroleptidae. It is endemic to Ethiopia and occurs in the montane highlands in Gojjam. Its range might be limited by the deep gorges of the Blue Nile. It is named in honour of Derek Yalden, a British zoologist who collected some of the types. Common names Yalden's tree frog and grassland forest treefrog have been coined for this species.

== Description ==
Adult males measure 26–34 mm (1.0–1.3 in) and adult females 38–43 mm (1.5–1.7 in) in snout–vent length. The habitus is relatively slender. The snout is moderate, slightly pointed in profile. The tympanum is round and fairly conspicuous. Digital discs are of moderate size. The webbing between the toes and the two outermost fingers is moderate.

This species has two colour morphs. One form is dorsally brown (ranging from pale cream or golden, sometimes greenish, through shades of grey-brown or red-brown to dark purplish-brown), typically with darker markings that may be prominent; the pattern includes an often incomplete interorbital bar and a triangular dorsal mark. The other morph is bright green (bright blue-green or yellow green, rarely silver-green or pale to dark olive); dorsal markings are usually absent. The green form dominates at the upper end of the altitude range of this species where the habitats are more open, whereas the brown morph is only present at lower altitudes where the habitat has more cover.

The male advertisement call is a series of screams followed by a click.

The tadpole have a short, deep body and relatively long tail. The largest specimen, with budding hindlimbs, measures 67 mm (2.6 in) in total length.

== Habitat and conservation ==
Leptopelis yaldeni occurs in montane grasslands and moderately degraded habitats such as rural settlements at elevations of 2,000–2,700 m (6,600–8,900 ft) above sea level. Breeding typically takes place close to the banks of small streams. Males call from exposed positions; if tall vegetation is available, they will often choose to call from elevated positions, but they may also call from on the ground if the pool margin is bare earth. The eggs are deposited in nests on land near the water, and the tadpoles develop in the water.

Leptopelis yaldeni is common and even abundant at many sites. Although it tolerates some habitat modification, it is likely that intensification of urbanization and agriculture will negatively impact this species. It is not known to occur in any protected areas.
