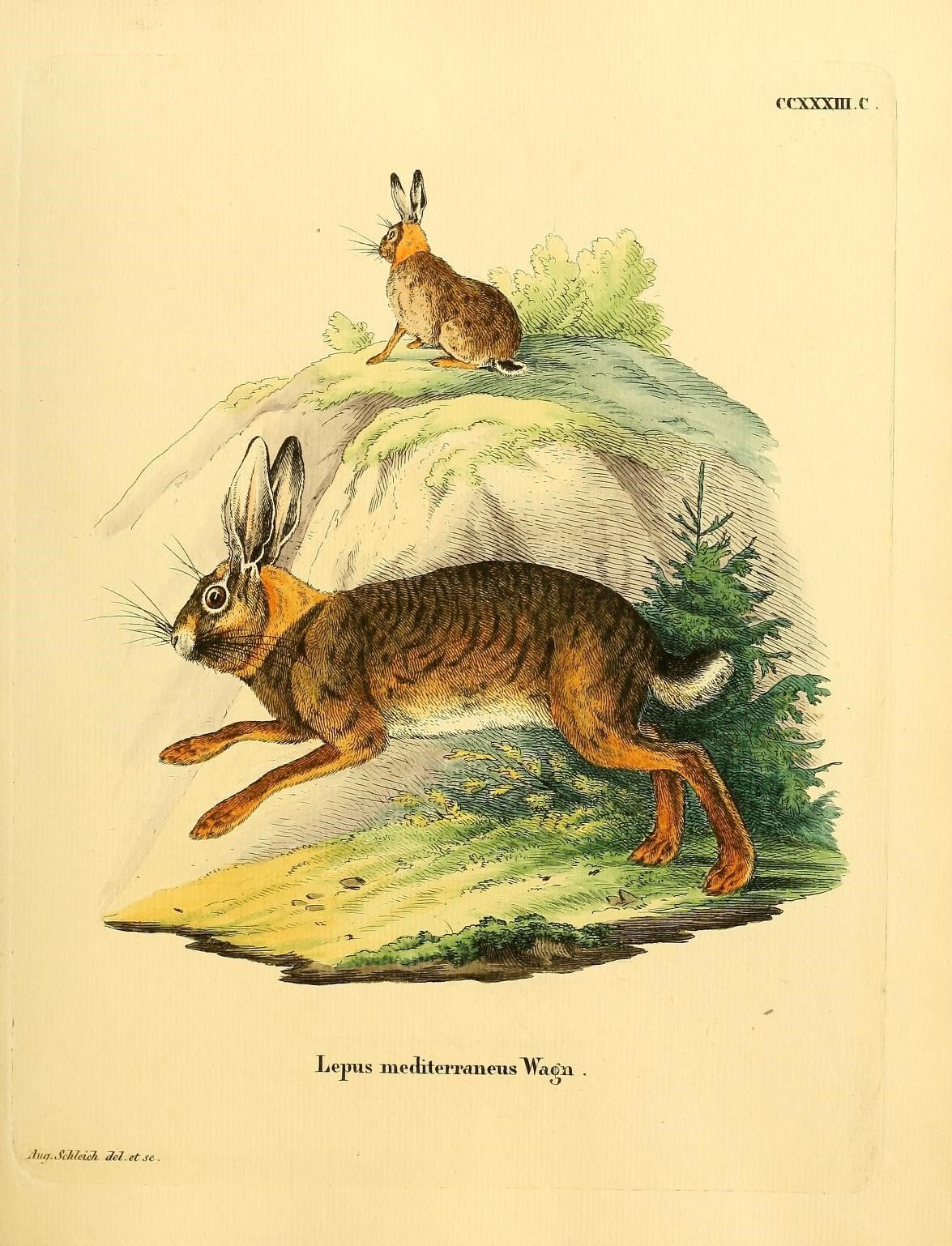
- Drawing of Lepus mediterraneus

Scientific classification
- Kingdom: Animalia
- Phylum: Chordata
- Class: Mammalia
- Order: Lagomorpha
- Family: Leporidae
- Genus: Lepus
- Species: L. mediterraneus

Binomial name
- Lepus mediterraneus J. A. Wagner, 1841

Synonyms
- L. kabylicus de Winton, 1898; L. pallidior Barrett-Hamilton, 1898; L. tunetae de Winton, 1898; whitakeri O. Thomas, 1902; typicus Hilzheimer, 1906 [preoccupied]; sefranus O. Thomas, 1913; barcaeus Ghigi, 1920; pediaeus Cabrera, 1923

= Mediterranean hare =

Species of mammal

The Mediterranean hare (Lepus mediterraneus), also known as the Northwest African hare and the Sardinian hare, is a species of mammal in the family Leporidae. It was first described in 1841 by Johann Andreas Wagner. Later, it was reclassified as a subspecies of the Cape hare (Lepus capensis), but was split in 2019 along with the Moroccan hare (Lepus schlumbergeri) from central Morocco and the West Sahara hare (Lepus saharae) from southern Morocco. The species has many synonyms, and likely represents a species complex.
