= David Elliott (poet) =

Canadian poet

David Lloyd ("Smoky") Elliott (1923–1999) was a Canadian poet.

Born in Garnish, Newfoundland and Labrador, Elliott grew up in a number of Newfoundland fishing outports, but spent most of his youth in Campbellton, Notre Dame Bay. He left school at age fifteen to become a telegraph operator and later served in World War II. In his memoir, A Soldier First, General Rick Hillier, retired Chief of Defence Staff of the Canadian Forces, recalls borrowing books from David Elliott while a boy growing up in Campbellton, and recounts the story that Elliott served in military intelligence during the Second World War.

Elliott entered Memorial University of Newfoundland at the age of 25, where he won numerous scholarships and awards, graduating with a first-class degree in English Language and Literature. Following studies in psychology at Dalhousie University in Halifax, he worked for a time as a clinical psychologist in St. John's, and then as an editor with the Queen's Printer in Ottawa before returning to Memorial as a Ph.D. student in the early 1970s. In 1975, Elliott joined the faculty of the Sir Wilfred Grenfell College campus of Memorial University, where he taught until his retirement in 1989.

After an initial burst of creativity, Elliott wrote little between the late 1950s and the late 1970s. Soon after his appointment to the English faculty at Grenfell College, however, inspired by an ambience that encouraged creative writing, he started to publish new poetry in literary magazines and anthologies, and began to receive invitations to read his work publicly. In 1982, a studio recording of him reading his poetry was included on the vinyl disc, Newfoundland Poets, Vol. 1 (Pigeon Inlet Productions). In 1988, his poetry was collected in The Edge of Beulah (St. John's: Breakwater Books). Elliott was one of the original performers at the literary festival, The March Hare, established in Corner Brook in the late 1980s, and in 1995 he was the first person to be honoured in having the festival for that year dedicated in his name, a practice that has since become an annual feature of the event.

One of Elliott's early poems was "Didymus on Saturday". Awarded first prize in the Newfoundland Arts and Letters Competition in 1954, it became one of the most anthologized contemporary Newfoundland poems. In it, Elliott portrays the apostle Thomas's disillusionment the day after the Crucifixion. An apparently simple narrative is complicated by language, which underscores the naked humanity of all the characters, and by point of view, which, in locating the monologue on the day between Christ's death and his resurrection, shows it to be time-limited. Having seen Christ walk to death between two thieves, "A little man whose face was cracked with fear, / And a tall man whose eyes were dull with doom", Thomas is overcome with biting shame for having believed easily. The poem ends in abandonment and despair as Thomas resolves to leave "this gray Jerusalem / where he lies sleeping in the hollowed stone, / Never to come into his kingdom now."
