= Ura Kidane Mehret =

Orthodox church in Amhara Region, Ethiopia

Coordinates: 11°41′41.9″N 37°20′28.41″E

Ura Kidane Mehret ኡራ ኪዳነ ምሕረት
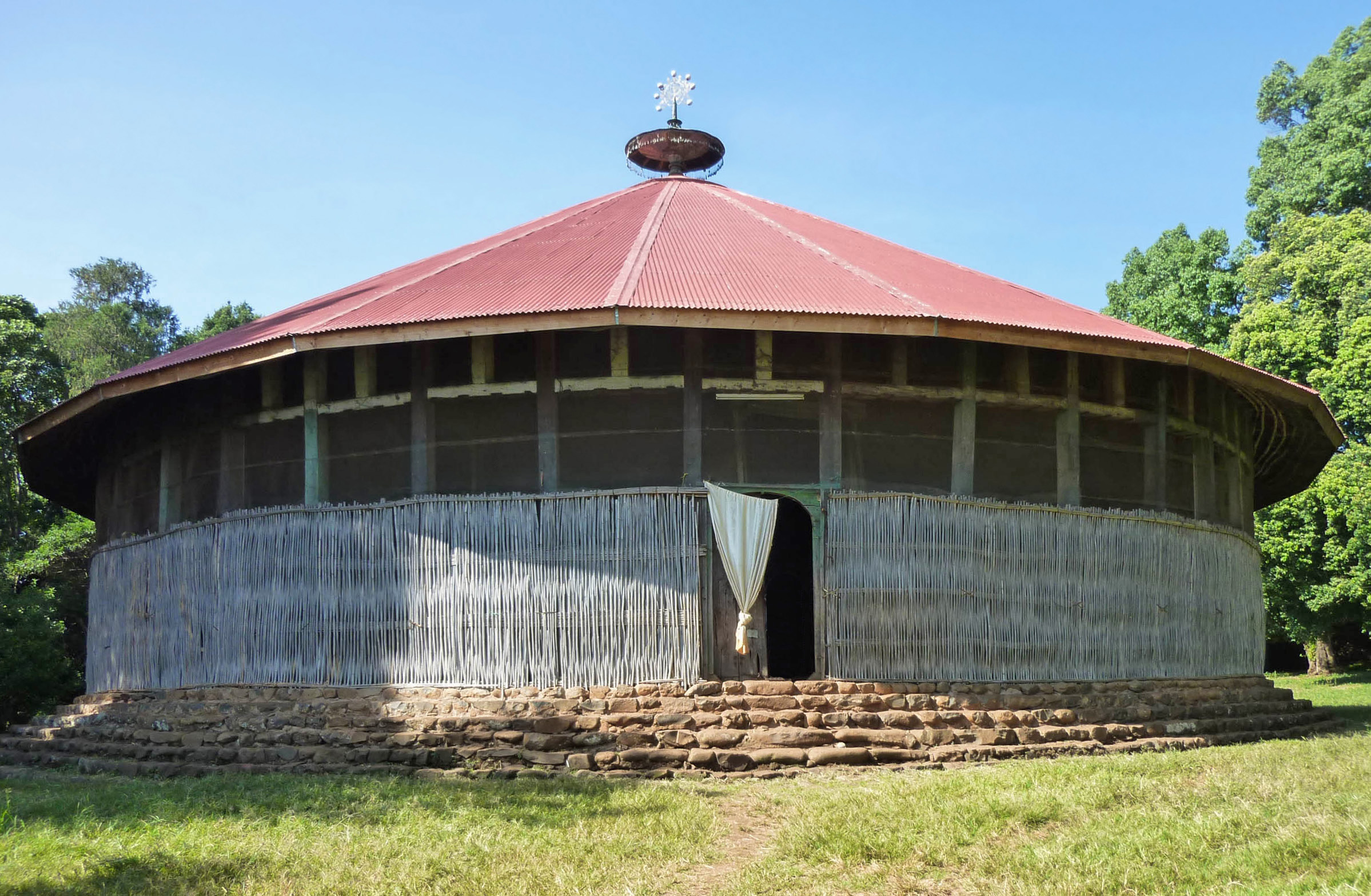
- Main church building

Religion
- Affiliation: Ethiopian Orthodox Tewahedo Church
- Year consecrated: Around the 14th Century
- Status: Active

Location
- Location: Zege Peninsula, Lake Tana, Amhara Region, Ethiopia
- Interactive map of Ura Kidane Mehret ኡራ ኪዳነ ምሕረት

Architecture
- Style: Round Church
- Founder: Betre Mariyam

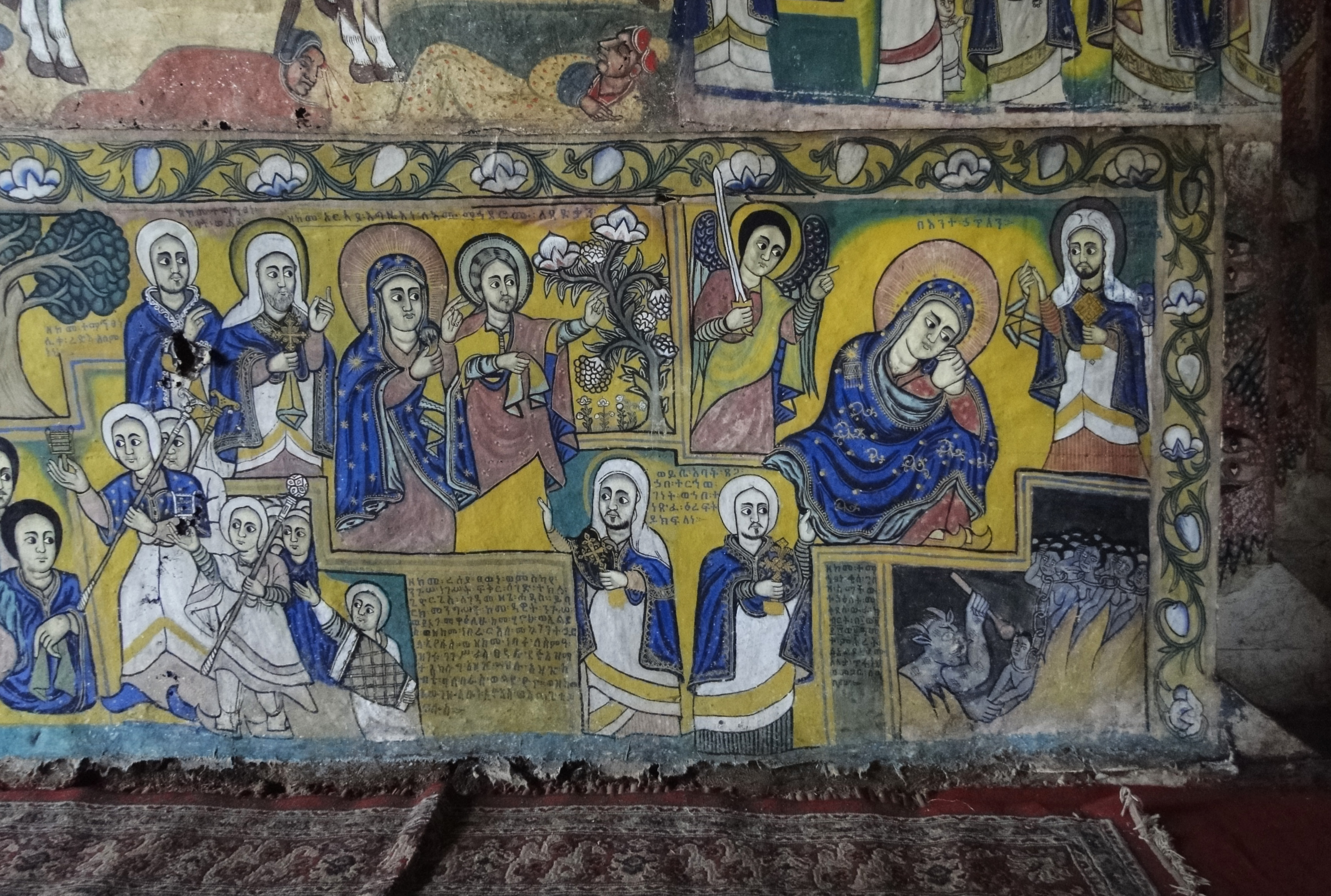
Paintings inside the church

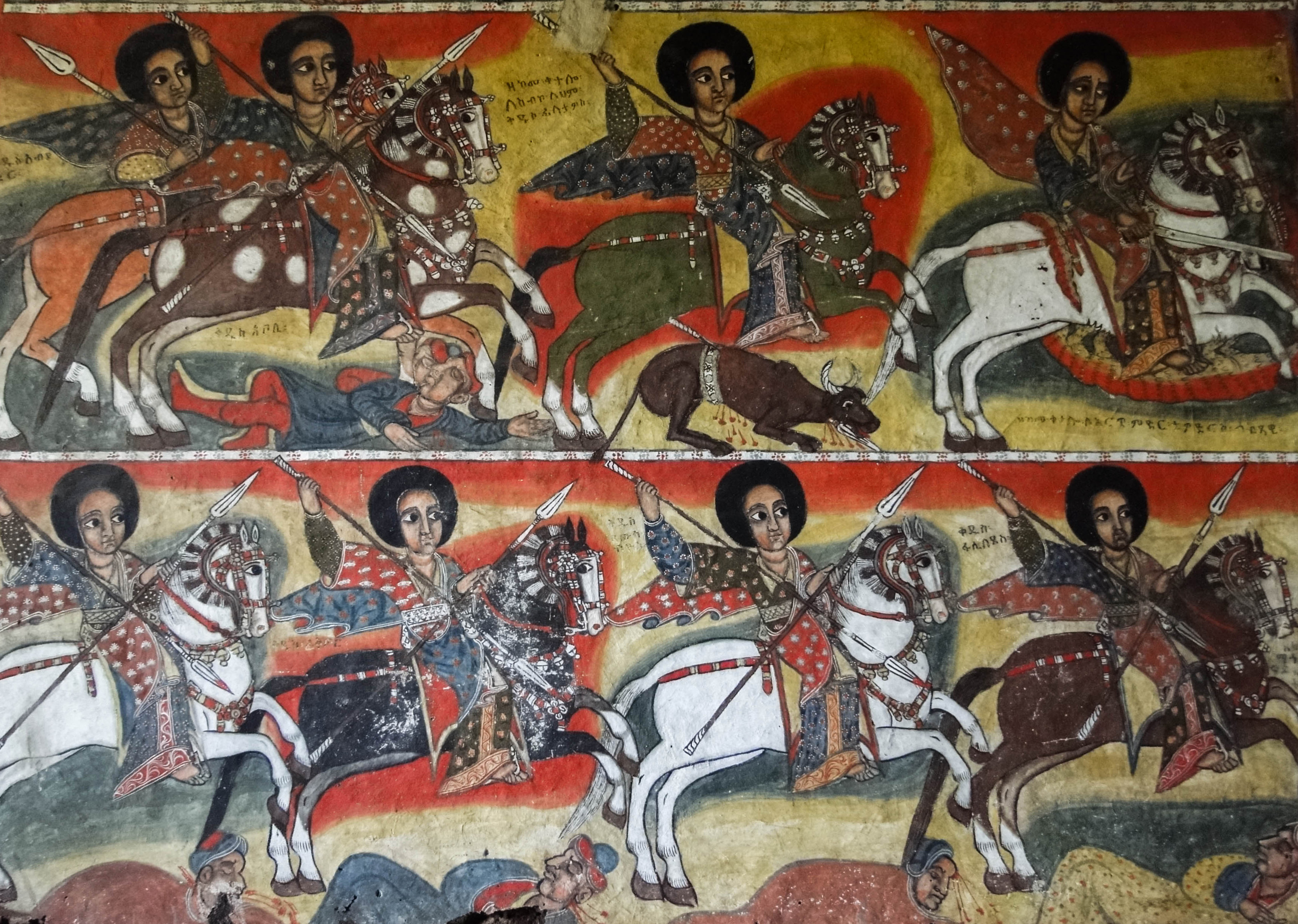
One of the paintings with Fasilides in the Bottom right corner and Menas of Ethiopia in the Bottom left corner

Ura Kidane Mehret is a round church of the Ethiopian Orthodox Church, located on the Zege peninsula around Lake Tana in Ethiopia. It is part of the complex of the Convent of Mercy. At least one author considers it the most attractive church in the Lake Tana region.

The Ura Kidane Mehret convent was founded in the 14th century by the saint Betre Mariyam (Amharic "Rod of Mary"), although the present circular church dates from the 16th century. Its interior is decorated with numerous murals painted between 100 and 250 years ago; subjects include Negus Tekle Haymanot of Gojjam and his followers. The most significant were painted by Alaqa Engida during the reign of Emperor Menelik II. The church has its treasury in a nearby outbuilding, which contains the richly embroidered robes of Negus Tekle Haymanot and his wife Laqetch Gegre Mehdin, as well as the crowns of Emperor Yohannes IV, Emperor Tewodros II, Negus Tekle Haymanot, and Emperor Tekle Giyorgis.
