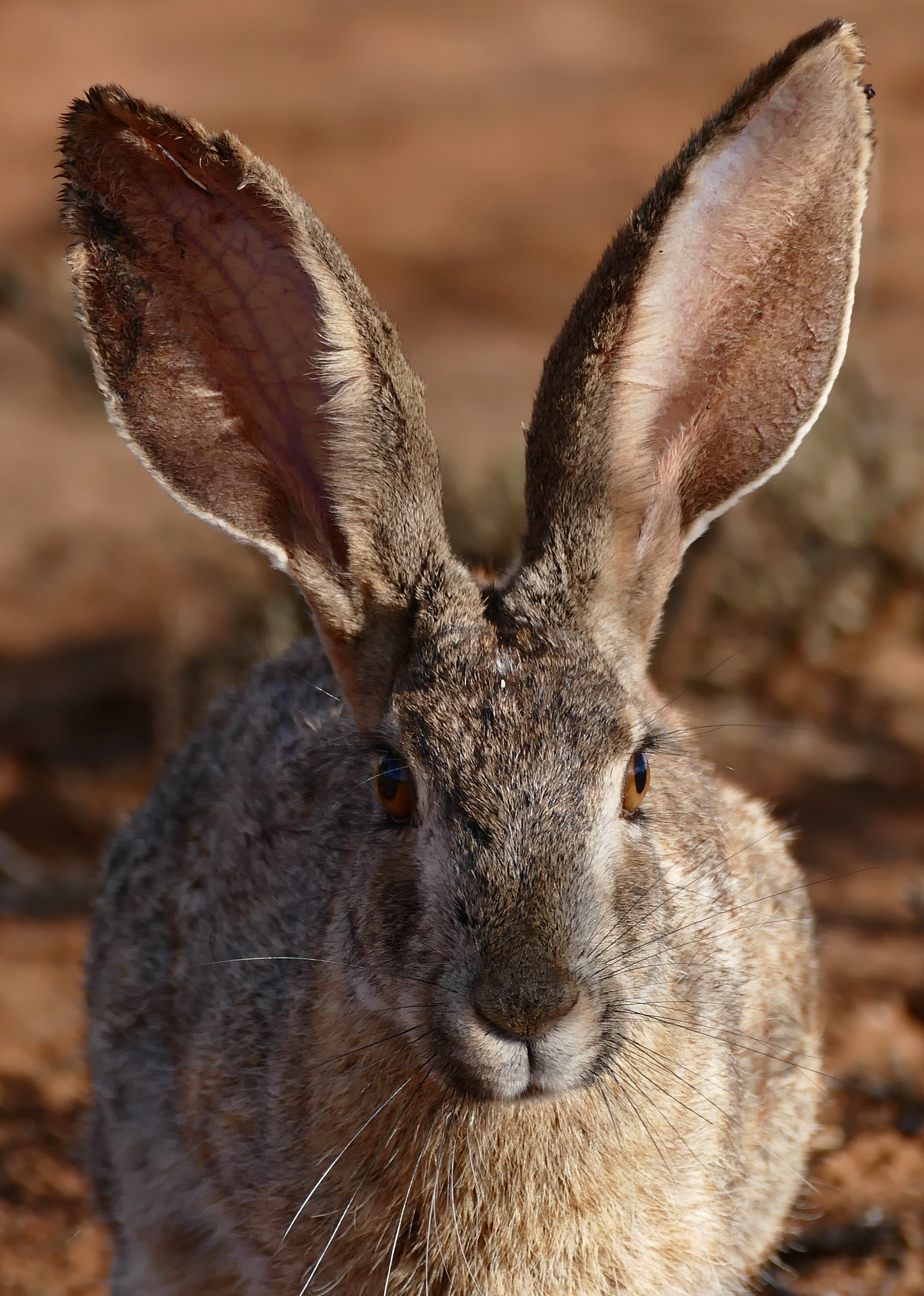
- Scrub hare (Lepus saxatilis)

Scientific classification
- Kingdom: Animalia
- Phylum: Chordata
- Class: Mammalia
- Order: Lagomorpha
- Family: Leporidae
- Genus: Lepus; Linnaeus, 1758

Type species
- Lepus timidus Linnaeus, 1758

Species
- See text
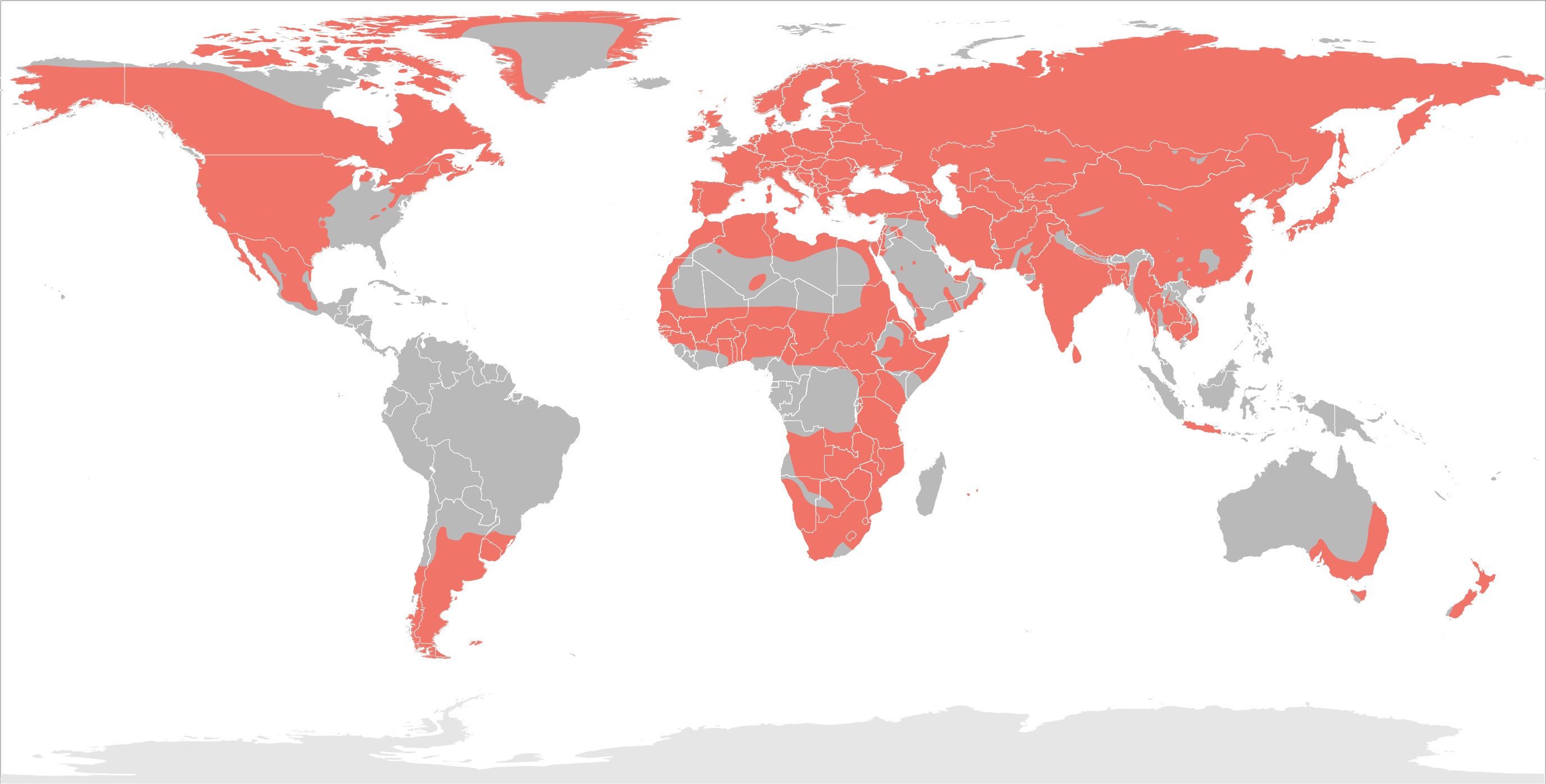
- Lepus distribution, including introductions

= Hare =

Hares

Genus of mammals in the family Leporidae

Hares are mammals belonging to the genus Lepus. They are herbivores and live solitarily or in pairs. They nest in depressions in the ground called forms, and their young are able to fend for themselves shortly after birth. The genus includes the largest lagomorphs. Most are fast runners with long, powerful hind legs, and large ears that dissipate body heat. Hare species are native to Africa, Eurasia and North America. A hare less than one year old is called a leveret. A group of hares may be called either a husk or a down.

Members of the Lepus genus are considered true hares, distinguishing them from rabbits which make up the rest of the Leporidae family. There are five species with common names that include the word "hare" which are not considered true hares: the hispid hare, and four species known as red rock hares (belonging to the genus Pronolagus). Conversely, several Lepus species are called "jackrabbits", but classed as hares rather than rabbits. The pet known as the Belgian hare is a domesticated European rabbit which has been selectively bred to resemble a hare.

== Biology ==
Hares are swift animals and can run up to 80 km/h (50 mph) over short distances. Over longer distances, the European hare (Lepus europaeus) can run up to 55 km/h (35 mph). The five species of jackrabbits found in central and western North America are able to run at 65 km/h (40 mph) over longer distances, and can leap up to 3 m (10 ft) at a time.

Normally a shy animal, the European brown hare changes its behavior in spring, when it can be seen in daytime chasing other hares. This appears to be competition between males (called bucks) to attain dominance for breeding. During this spring frenzy, animals of both sexes can be seen "boxing", one hare striking another with its paws. This behavior gives rise to the idiom "mad as a March hare". This is present not only in intermale competition, but also among females (called does) toward males to prevent copulation.

Hares, like all leporids, have jointed, or kinetic, skulls. This jointing allows for the skull to deform and better absorb the kinetic energy imparted by running. All hares have a dental formula of 2.0.3.31.0.2.3 × 2 = 28. This means that they have two pairs of upper and one pair of lower incisors, no canines, three upper and two lower premolars on each side, and three upper and lower molars on either side of the jaw.

Hares have a reputation for better backward vision than forward vision.

=== Differences from rabbits ===
Hares are generally larger and have exaggerated features compared to those of rabbits, particularly in their large ears, eyes, and hind feet. All hares have 48 chromosomes, while rabbits may have a number of chromosomes ranging from 38 to 52. Rabbits, particularly the European rabbit, have been domesticated; rabbit farmers produce meat, fur, and wool, in addition to breeding pets and laboratory animals. Conversely, no hares have been domesticated, though some captive populations are raised for food and to be released for sport hunting. (The Belgian hare is actually a breed of rabbit that has been bred to look more like a hare, most likely from stock of Flemish Giant rabbits.)

Some rabbits live and give birth underground in burrows, with many burrows in an area forming a warren. Other rabbits and hares live and give birth in simple forms (shallow depressions or flattened nests of grass) above the ground. Hares usually do not live in groups. Young hares are adapted to the lack of physical protection, relative to that afforded by a burrow, by being born fully furred and with eyes open. They are hence precocial, able to fend for themselves soon after birth. By contrast, rabbits are altricial, being born blind and hairless.

=== Diet ===
Easily digestible food is processed in the gastrointestinal tract, expelling the waste as regular feces. For nutrients that are harder to extract, hares, like all lagomorphs, ferment fiber in the cecum and expel the mass as cecotropes, which they ingest again, a practice called cecotrophy or refection. The cecotropes are absorbed in the small intestine to use the nutrients.

=== Habitat ===
Hares can be found in a wide variety of habitats, ranging from desert environments and arctic tundra to temperate grasslands, forests, swamps, mountains, and tropical regions. Some hares such as the snowshoe hare may change their fur color to better hide as the seasons change. The adaptability of the European hare to different environments has led to it becoming an invasive species in regions where it is newly introduced.

=== Classification ===
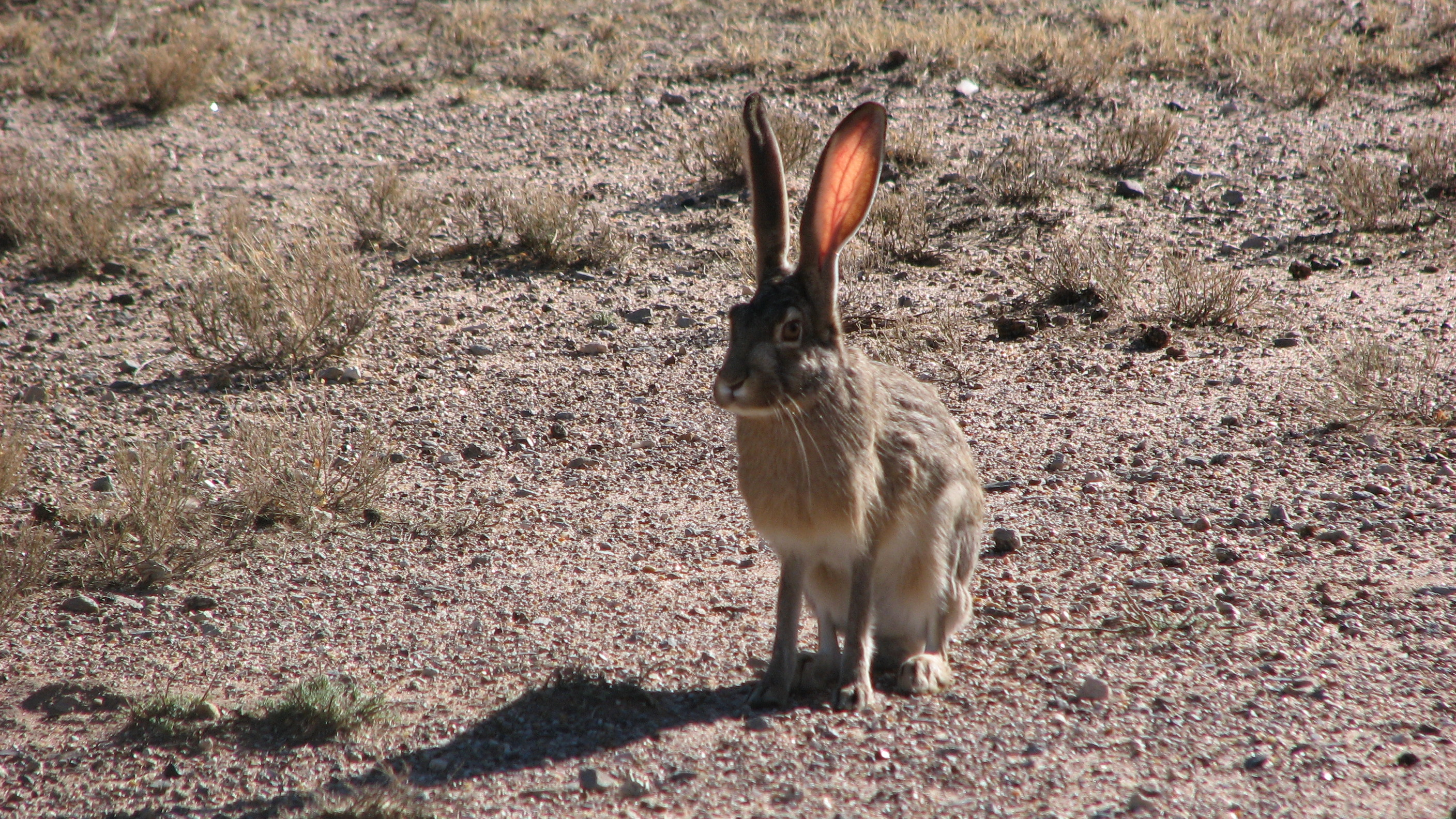
Black-tailed jackrabbit in El Paso, Texas

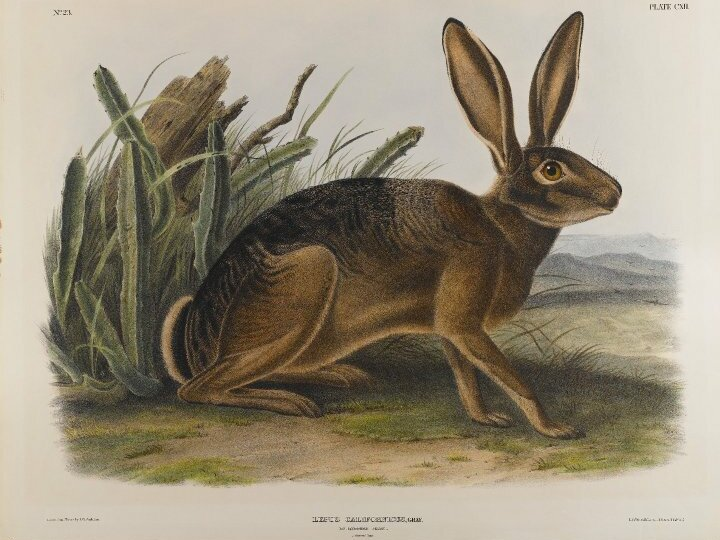
Brooklyn Museum - California Hare - John J. Audubon

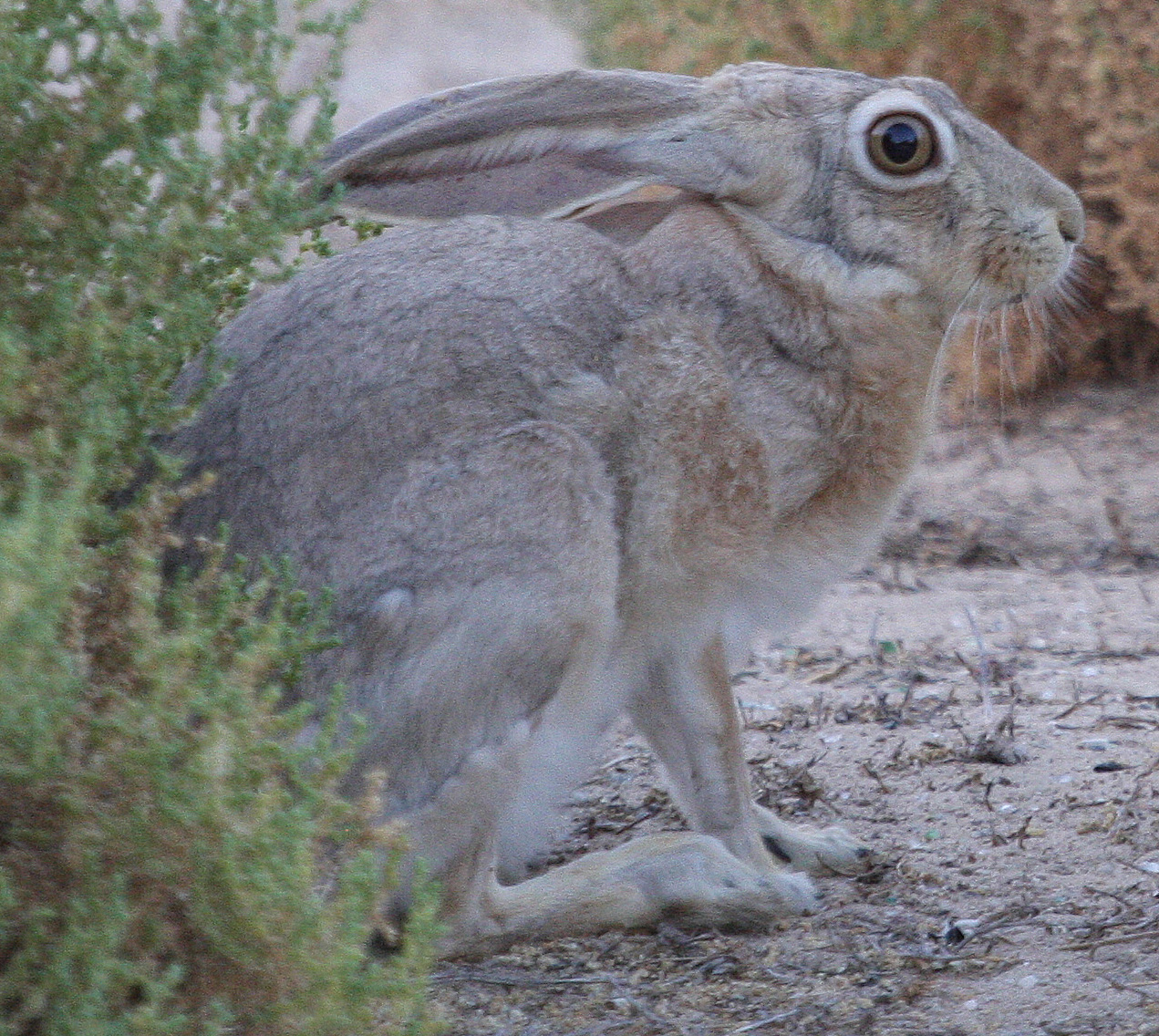
Cape hare (Lepus capensis)

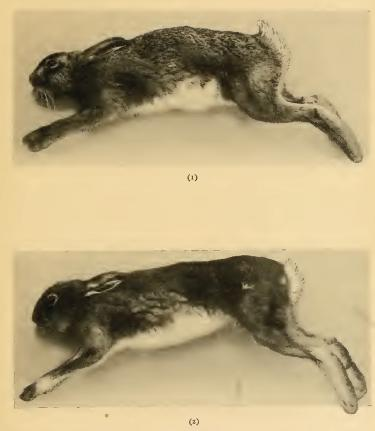
European hare (above) and mountain hare

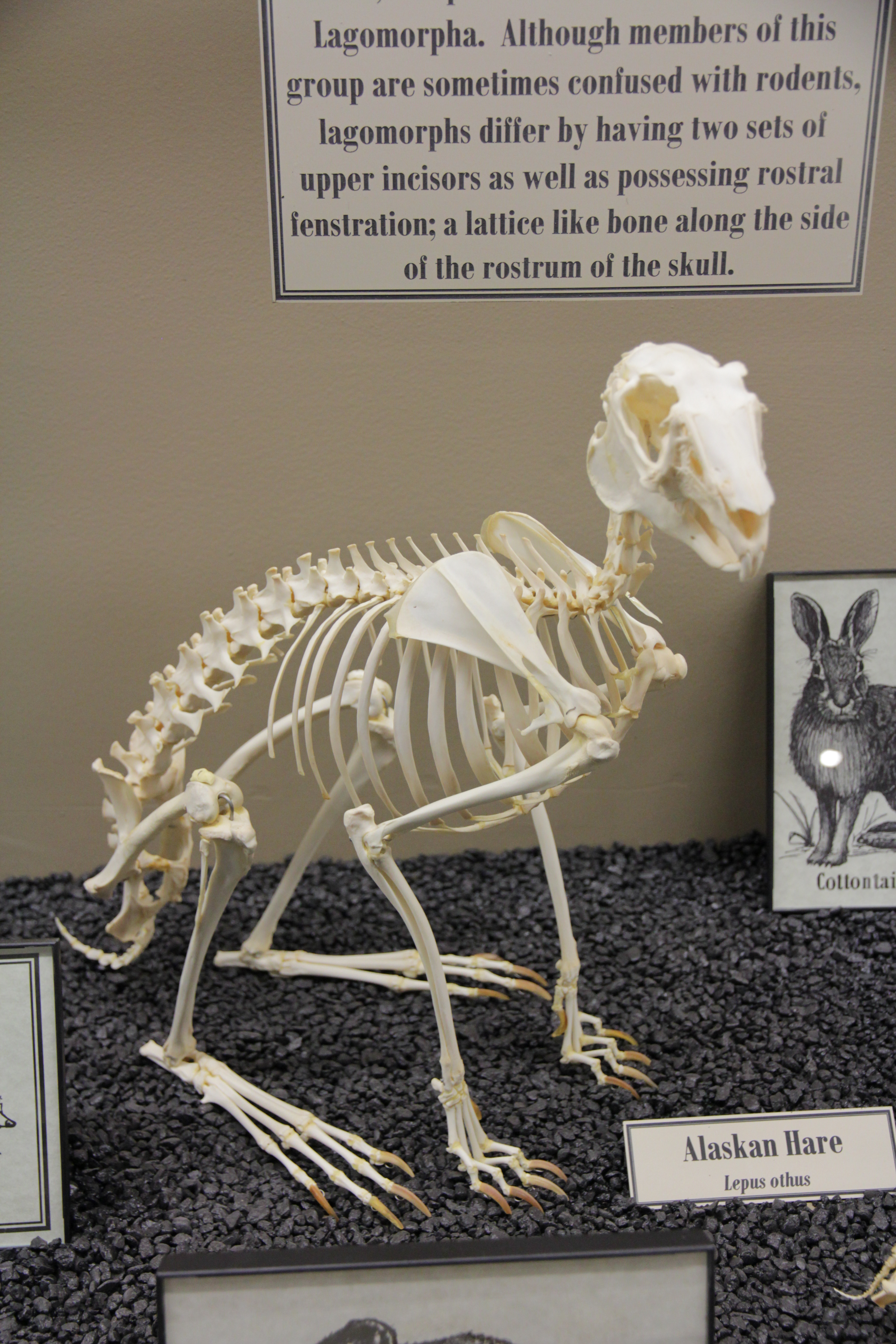
Alaskan hare's skeletal system (Museum of Osteology)

- Genus Lepus
  - Subgenus Macrotolagus
    - Antelope jackrabbit, Lepus alleni
  - Subgenus Poecilolagus
    - Snowshoe hare, Lepus americanus
  - Subgenus Lepus
    - Arctic hare, Lepus arcticus
    - Alaskan hare, Lepus othus
    - Mountain hare, Lepus timidus
  - Subgenus Proeulagus
    - Black jackrabbit, Lepus insularis
    - Desert hare, Lepus tibetanus
    - Tolai hare, Lepus tolai
  - Subgenus Eulagos
    - Broom hare, Lepus castroviejoi
    - Yunnan hare, Lepus comus
    - Korean hare, Lepus coreanus
    - European hare, Lepus europaeus
    - Manchurian hare, Lepus mandshuricus
    - Ethiopian highland hare, Lepus starcki
  - Subgenus Sabanalagus
    - Ethiopian hare, Lepus fagani
    - African savanna hare, Lepus victoriae
  - Subgenus Indolagus
    - Hainan hare, Lepus hainanus
    - Indian hare, Lepus nigricollis
    - Burmese hare, Lepus peguensis
  - Subgenus Sinolagus
    - Chinese hare, Lepus sinensis
  - Subgenus Tarimolagus
    - Yarkand hare, Lepus yarkandensis
  - Incertae sedis
    - Tamaulipas jackrabbit, Lepus altamirae
    - Japanese hare, Lepus brachyurus
    - Black-tailed jackrabbit, Lepus californicus
    - White-sided jackrabbit, Lepus callotis
    - Cape hare, Lepus capensis
    - Corsican hare, Lepus corsicanus
    - Tehuantepec jackrabbit, Lepus flavigularis
    - Granada hare, Lepus granatensis
    - Abyssinian hare, Lepus habessinicus
    - Mediterranean hare, Lepus mediterraneus
    - Woolly hare, Lepus oiostolus
    - West Sahara hare, Lepus saharae
    - Scrub hare, Lepus saxatilis
    - Moroccan hare, Lepus schlumbergeri
    - White-tailed jackrabbit, Lepus townsendii

== In human culture ==
=== Food ===
==== Meat ====
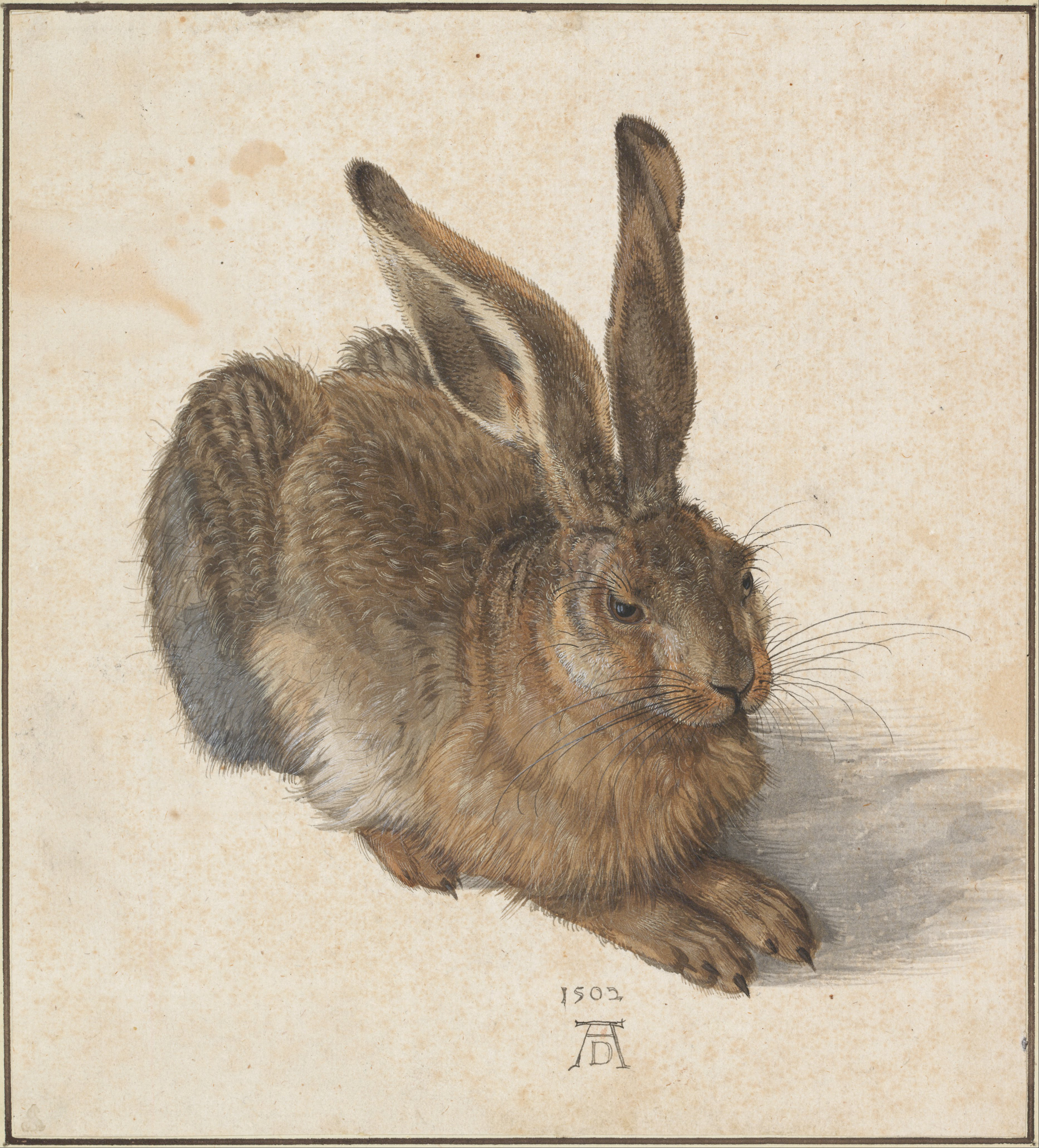
Young Hare, a watercolour, 1502, by Albrecht Dürer

Hares and rabbits are plentiful in many areas, adapt to a wide variety of conditions, and reproduce quickly, so hunting is often less regulated than for other varieties of game. They are a common source of protein worldwide. Because of their extremely low fat content, they are a poor choice as a survival food.

Hares can be prepared in the same manner as rabbits—commonly roasted or parted for breading and frying.

Hasenpfeffer (also spelled Hasenfeffer) is a traditional German stew made from marinated rabbit or hare, seasoned with black pepper (German Pfeffer) and other spices. Wine or vinegar is also a prominent ingredient, to lend a sourness to the recipe.

Lagos stifado (Λαγός στιφάδο)—hare stew with pearl onions, vinegar, red wine, and cinnamon—is a much-prized dish enjoyed in Greece and Cyprus and communities in the diaspora.

The hare (and in recent times, the rabbit) is a staple of Maltese cuisine. The dish was presented to the island's Grandmasters of the Sovereign Military Order of Malta, as well as Renaissance Inquisitors resident on the island, several of whom went on to become pope.

According to Jewish tradition, the hare is among mammals deemed not kosher, and therefore not eaten by observant Jews. Muslims deem coney meat (rabbit, pika, hyrax) to be halal, and in Egypt, hare and rabbit are popular meats for mulukhiyah (jute leaf soup), especially in Cairo.

==== Blood ====
The blood of a freshly killed hare can be collected for consumption in a stew or casserole in a cooking process known as jugging. First the entrails are removed from the hare carcass before it is hung in a larder by its hind legs, which causes blood to accumulate in the chest cavity. One method of preserving the blood after draining it from the hare (since the hare is usually hung for a week or more) is to mix it with red wine vinegar to prevent coagulation, and then to store it in a freezer.

Jugged hare, known as civet de lièvre in France, is a whole hare, cut into pieces, marinated, and cooked with red wine and juniper berries in a tall jug that stands in a pan of water. It traditionally is served with the hare's blood (or the blood is added right at the end of the cooking process) and port wine.

Jugged hare is described in an influential 18th-century English cookbook, The Art of Cookery by Hannah Glasse, with a recipe titled, "A Jugged Hare", that begins, "Cut it into little pieces, lard them here and there ..." The recipe goes on to describe cooking the pieces of hare in water in a jug set within a bath of boiling water to cook for three hours. In the 19th century, a myth arose that Glasse's recipe began with the words "First, catch your hare."

Many other British cookbooks from before the middle of the 20th century have recipes for jugged hare. Merle and Reitch have this to say about jugged hare, for example:

The best part of the hare, when roasted, is the loin and the thick part of the hind leg; the other parts are only fit for stewing, hashing, or jugging. It is usual to roast a hare first, and to stew or jug the portion which is not eaten the first day. ...
To Jug A Hare. This mode of cooking a hare is very desirable when there is any doubt as to its age, as an old hare, which would be otherwise uneatable, may be made into an agreeable dish.

In 2006, a survey of 2021 people for the UKTV Food television channel found only 1.6% of the people under 25 recognized jugged hare by name. Seven of ten stated they would refuse to eat jugged hare if it were served at the house of a friend or a relative.

In England, a rarely served dish is potted hare. The hare meat is cooked, then covered in at least one inch (preferably more) of butter. The butter is a preservative (excludes air); the dish can be stored for up to several months. It is served cold, often on bread or as an appetizer.

=== Taming ===
No extant domesticated hares exist. A breed of European rabbit known as the Belgian hare was selectively bred to resemble a hare. Hare remains have been found in a wide range of human settlement sites, with some showing signs of use beyond simple hunting and eating:

- A European brown hare was buried alongside an older woman mid fifth millennium BC, in a grave discovered in today's Hungary.
- 12 Mountain hare metapodials were found in a Swedish grave from third millennium BC.
- The Tolai hare (originally described as a Cape hare, amended according to range) was tamed by northern Chinese people in the neolithic period (~third millennium BC) and fed millets.

=== In mythology and folklore ===
The hare in African folk tales is a trickster; some of the stories about the hare were retold among enslaved Africans in America and are the basis of the Br'er Rabbit stories. The hare appears in English folklore in the saying "as mad as a March hare", and in the legend of the White Hare, which alternatively tells of a witch who takes the form of a white hare and goes out looking for prey at night, or of the spirit of a broken-hearted maiden who cannot rest and who haunts her unfaithful lover.

The constellation Lepus is taken to represent a hare, having been named by the Greco-Roman scholar Ptolemy c. 150 CE. Hares are associated with moon deities in various cultures. In Wales, they are strongly associated with the saint Melangell.

The hare was once regarded as an animal sacred to Aphrodite and Eros because of its high libido. Live hares were often presented as a gift of love. In European witchcraft, hares were either witches' familiars or a witch who had transformed themself into a hare. Pop mythology associates the hare with the Anglo-Saxon goddess Ēostre as an explanation for the Easter Bunny.

In European tradition, the hare symbolises the two qualities of swiftness and timidity. The latter resulted in the scientific name Lepus timidus that was given to the mountain hare by Swedish biologist Carl Linnaeus. Several ancient fables depict the Hare in flight: In one, The Hares and the Frogs, they decide to commit mass suicide to relieve the angst of constantly fleeing threats, but reconsider when they startle frogs on the way to throwing themselves into the river. Conversely, in The Tortoise and the Hare, perhaps the best-known among Aesop's Fables, the hare loses a race through being too confident in its swiftness. In Irish folklore, the hare is often associated with the Aos sí or other pagan elements. In these stories, characters who harm hares often suffer dreadful consequences.

In the Otia Imperialia, the author Gervase of Tilbury describes a creature called a "Grant" as a fire omen. The creature allegedly looks like a bipedal foal that runs through the streets to warn of fire. One interpretation is that the Grant is an exaggerated hare. Hares as fire omens have persisted in parts of England into modernity.

=== In literature and art ===
==== Three hares ====
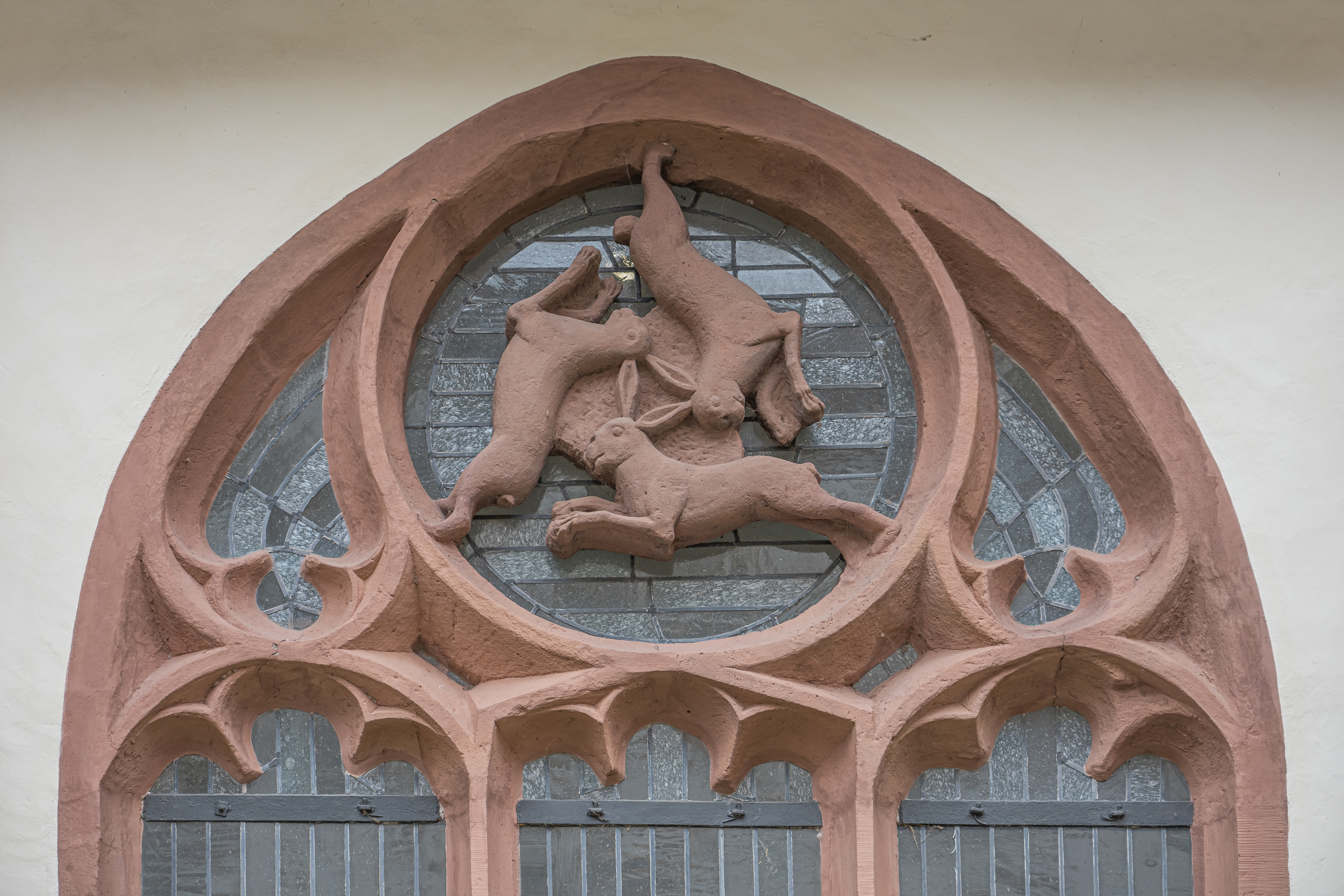
Dreihasenfenster (Window of Three Hares) in Paderborn Cathedral

A study in 2004 followed the history and migration of a symbolic image of three hares with conjoined ears. In this image, three hares are seen chasing each other in a circle with their heads near its centre. While each of the animals appears to have two ears, only three ears are depicted. The ears form a triangle at the centre of the circle and each is shared by two of the hares. The image has been traced from Christian churches in the English county of Devon right back along the Silk Road to China, via western and eastern Europe and the Middle East. Before its appearance in China, it was possibly first depicted in the Middle East before being reimported centuries later. Its use is associated with Christian, Jewish, Islamic and Buddhist sites stretching back to about 600 AD.

=== Place names ===
The hare has given rise to local place names, as they can often be observed in favoured localities. An example in Scotland is "Murchland", murchen being a Scots word for a hare.
