= Mad as a March hare =

English idiomatic phrase

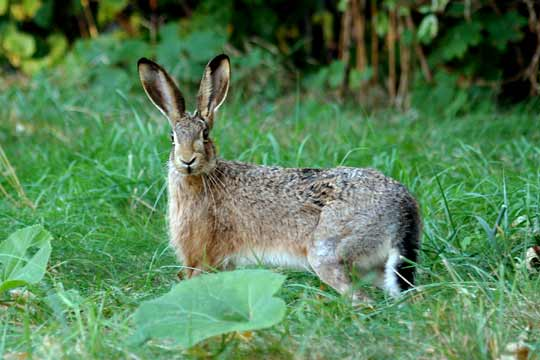
A European hare

To be as "mad as a March hare" is an English idiomatic phrase derived from the observed antics said to occur only in the March breeding season of the European hare (Lepus europaeus). The phrase is an allusion that can be used to refer to any other animal or human who behaves in the excitable and unpredictable manner of a March hare.

== Historical development of the idiom ==
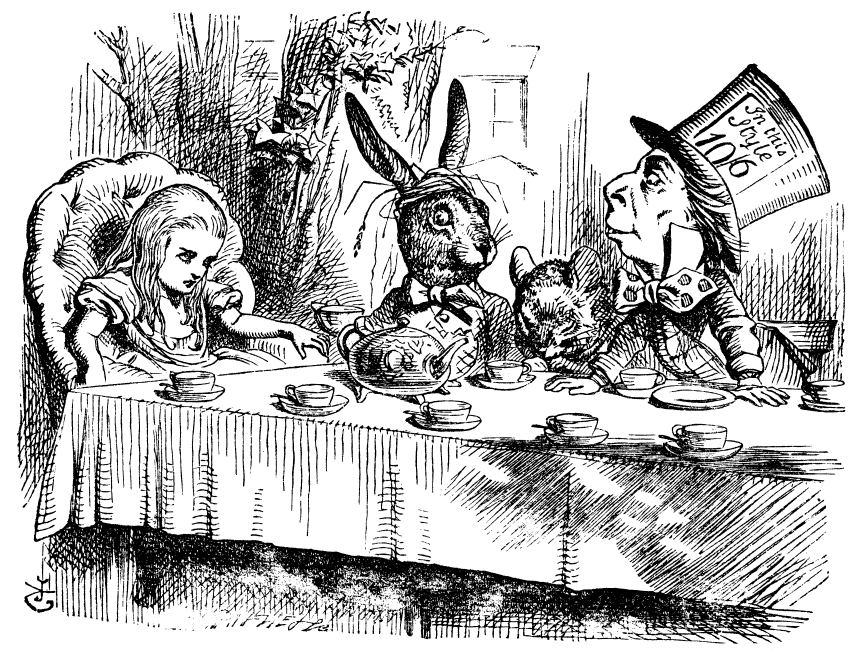
The March Hare with Alice, the Dormouse, and the Hatter from Alice's Adventures in Wonderland

A long-held view is that the hare will behave strangely and excitedly throughout its breeding season, which, in Europe, peaks in the month of March. This odd behaviour includes boxing at other hares, jumping vertically for seemingly no reason and generally displaying abnormal behaviour. An early verbal record of this animal's strange behaviour occurred in about 1500, in the poem Blowbol's Test where the original poet said:

Thanne þey begyn to swere and to stare,
And be as braynles as a Marshe hare

Translation:

Then they begin to swerve and to stare,
And be as brainless as a March hare

Similar phrases are attested in the sixteenth century in the works of John Skelton (Replycacion, 1528: "Aiii, I saye, thou madde Marche Hare"; Magnyfycence, 1529: "As mery as a marche hare"). A later recorded use of the phrase occurs in the writings of Sir Thomas More (The supplycacyon of soulys made by syr Thomas More knyght councellour to our souerayn lorde the Kynge and chauncellour of hys Duchy of Lancaster. Agaynst the supplycacyon of beggars: "As mad not as a March hare, but as a madde dogge."

Although the phrase in general has been in continuous use since the 16th century, it was popularised in more recent times by Lewis Carroll in his 1865 children's book Alice's Adventures in Wonderland, in which the March Hare is a character.

== Biological basis ==
During the breeding season of European or brown hares, male hares typically chase female ones. However, if a female hare does not wish to mate with a male hare, she may respond by engaging in a fight with the male hare. Observations of this particular behaviour have likely contributed to the association contained within the phrase "mad as a March hare."

== See also ==
- The Daily Telegraph Affair of 1908, during which Wilhelm II of Germany referred to the English as being "mad as March hares".
- Hare
- Mad as a hatter
- March Hare
- March Hare (festival)
