= Derek Yalden =

British zoologist and academic

Derek William Yalden B.Sc., Ph.D.
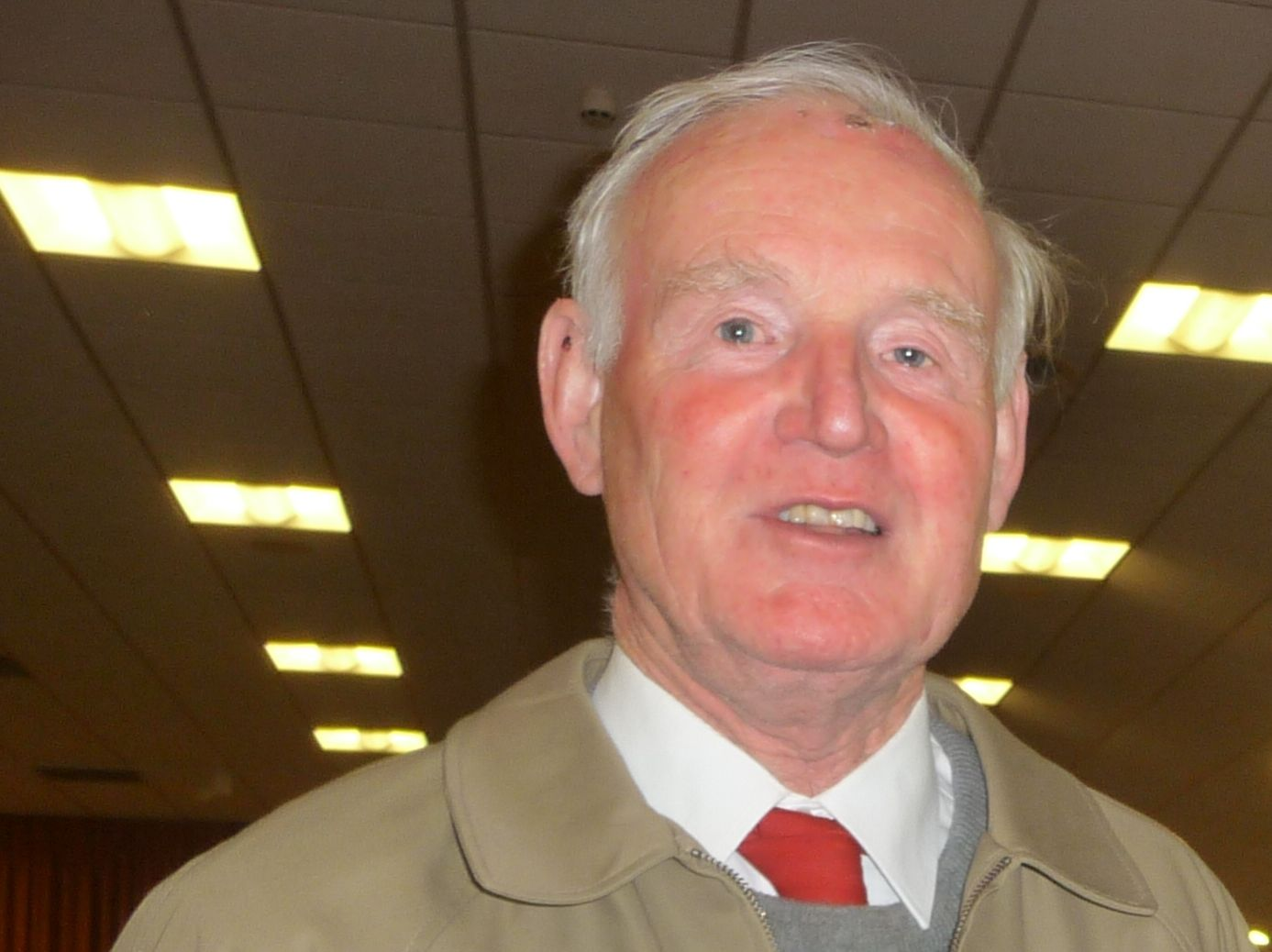
- Yalden at the BTO Conference in 2010
- Born: 4 November 1940; Surrey, England
- Died: 5 February 2013 (aged 72)
- Monuments: Leptopelis yaldeni, (grassland forest tree frog); Desmomys yaldeni (Yalden's desmomys, a rodent)
- Education: University College London; Royal Holloway College
- Occupations: Academic; Author
- Employer(s): University of Manchester, School of Biological Sciences
- Known for: President of The Mammal Society

Derek William Yalden (4 November 1940 – 5 February 2013) was an eminent British zoologist and academic. He was an honorary header at the University of Manchester.

After obtaining a 1st Class B.Sc. University College London in 1962, he completed his PhD on carpal bones in mammals at Royal Holloway College, under P. M. Butler, in 1965. He then worked as an Assistant Lecturer, and eventually Senior Lecturer, at the University of Manchester, School of Biological Sciences, teaching vertebrate zoology. He retired from there in 2005, after 40 years' service.

He was president of The Mammal Society from 1997 until his death, and edited their journal, Mammal Review from 1980–2002. He authored or co-authored over 200 scientific publications.

Leptopelis yaldeni, (grassland forest tree frog, named by M. Largen in 1977), and Desmomys yaldeni (Yalden's desmomys, a rodent named by L. Lavrenchenko in 2003) are named in his honour. Both are endemic to Ethiopia.

== Derek Yalden Fund ==
An expert in the mammals of the UK and of Ethiopia, Yalden also took hundreds of students on field courses. To honour his memory, a fund has been set up to provide undergraduates from limited income families with financial support to help fund their field trips whilst studying at Manchester.

== Research ==
Yalden listed his research interests as:

- Cataloguing the mammal fauna of Ethiopia, with contributions to the Handbook of the Mammals of Africa
- Conservation ecology of the Peak District, including:
  - Investigations of moorland erosion and restoration
  - Work on the ecology of golden plovers
  - Common sandpipers
  - Mountain hares
  - Red-necked wallabies.
- History of Mammals and Birds in Britain
  - A project to compile a database of archaeological records of birds in Britain, funded by The Leverhulme Trust
- Excavation (1966–90) of Foxhole Cave, in the Peak District, in conjunction with the Peakland Archaeological Society

== Publications ==
=== Books ===
- Which Bat is it? by R. E. Stebbings, D. W. Yalden and J. S. Herman; 3rd ed. London: Mammal Society, c2007 ISBN 0-906282-64-0
- Yalden, D. W. (Derek William) (1977). The Identification of remains in Owl Pellets. Reading: Mammal Society. pp. 8p. : ill., 22cm.
- Snow, Keith Ronald; D. W. Yalden (1978). Identification of larval ticks found on small mammals in Britain. Reading: Mammal Society. pp. 14p. : ill., 22cm. ISBN 0-906282-02-0.
- Yalden, D. W. (Derek William) (1982). When did the mammal fauna of the British Isles arrive?. Oxford: Blackwell Scientific, for the Mammal Society. pp. 57p : ill., maps, 25 cm.
- Yalden, D. W. (Derek William) (1987). The scientific names of British mammals and why they change. London: Mammal Society. pp. 11p, 22cm.
- Yalden, D. W. (Derek William); Malcolm Largen; D. Kock (1996). A catalogue of the mammals of Ethiopia. [S.l.]: [s.n.] pp. 1 v. (various pagings), 25 cm.
- Yalden, D. W. (Derek William); Priscilla Barrett (1999). The history of British mammals. London: T. & A.D. Poyser. pp. 305 p. : ill., maps, 24 cm. ISBN 0-85661-110-7.
- Wheeler, Philip Michael Da Silva; D. W. Yalden (2002). Distribution of mammals across the upland landscape. Manchester: University of Manchester. pp. 247p.
- Harris, S.; D. W. Yalden (2008). Mammals of the British Isles handbook (4th ed.). Southampton: The Mammal Society. pp. xiv, 799 p. : ill., 31 cm. ISBN 978-0-906282-65-6.
- Yalden, D. W.; Albarella, U. (2009). The History of British Birds. Oxford: Oxford University Press. ISBN 978-0-19-921751-9.

=== Journal articles (selected) ===
- Corbet, G.B. and D.W. Yalden. 1972. Recent records of mammals (other than bats) from Ethiopia. Bulletin of the British Museum (Natural History), Zoology 22: 213-252.
- "Bog Bilberry Vaccinium uliginosum in the Peak District". Sorby Record; 40: 28-29 (2001)
- "The older history of the White-tailed Eagle in Britain". British Birds; 100: 471–480. (2007)
- Pearce-Higgins JW, Finney SK, Yalden DW, Langston RHW (2007) "Testing the effects of recreational disturbance on two upland breeding waders". Ibis; 148 (Suppl 1): 45–55. (2007)
