= Zege Peninsula =

Peninsula in Lake Tana, Ethiopia

The Zege Peninsula is a peninsula located on the southern shore of Lake Tana in Ethiopia, the largest lake in Ethiopia and the source of the Blue Nile river, and is situated at (11° 40’ to 11° 43’ N and 37 °19’ to 37 °21’ E). It is 600 km northwest of Addis Ababa, the capital city of Ethiopia. It is considered an area sacred to the Ethiopian Orthodox Tewahedo Church, boasting multiple historical monasteries. In contrast to the arable farmland region around it, the Zege peninsula is notable for its dense coffee forest. This originates from a religious prohibition in the area on cutting trees, ploughing land, and raising large beasts.

The origin of the term "zegié" is somewhat obscure. As a place name, the word "zege" signifies a peninsula that encloses two rural qebele, the former monastery and Zägé town at the gate of the main land of the peninsula. At present, Zegé is part of Bahir Dar city administration, and is 32 km from the main town, the capital of Amhara National Regional State. Informants from Ura Kidane Mehret monastic church, one of the earliest church in the peninsula, associated the term to Debra Zegag and Abba Nahom; whereas some monks who were servants of Mähal Zegié Giyorgis attributed the term to Zengie (my shaft) and to Abun Betre Maryam, founder of Zegie monastery. Still another church scholar, Aleqa Aynakulu Mersha, related the term to a name of a tribe called Zegie (Aleqa Aynekulu) 1955 E.C:466; Tadese Tamrat, 1994:954-959). On the peninsula of Zege there are six monastic churches, all established between the 14th and 17th centuries.

== Background ==
A heart shaped Lake and source of Blue Nile Lake Tana is situated in northwestern Ethiopia in the area between Gonder and Gojjam, to the north of Bahir Dar. It is the largest lake in the country, at 3600 square kilometers. Lake Tana has about 37 islands and hosts about 30 ancient and historic monasteries endowed with precious heritages and ancient books as well as documents. Sources traced the foundation of many of its monasteries back to the 14th century, out of the thirty monastic churches on the islands. On the land around Lake Tana, seven churches were founded in the Zege peninsula that occupy a large land mass that pushes the lake from the west in an easterly direction. Among the monasteries of Zeghie, Mahal Zeghie Georgies and Bete Mariam are believed to be the earliest, as in the hagiography of Betre Mariam it is stated the other six churches were established long after the foundation of Mehal Zege Giyorgies.

The history of the monasteries of lake and its surroundings is associated with the seven stars. The term seven stars refers to the saints who were pioneers it the evangelization of the Lake Tana region. Thus the Abune Betre Mariam, who was one of the "seven stars", founded Mehal Zege Giyorgies in 1264 CE. Many monasteries on this peninsula have a steeple-like structure on the roof; this steeple consists of seven ostrich eggs, which signify the seven saints.

== Monasteries on the Tana islands ==
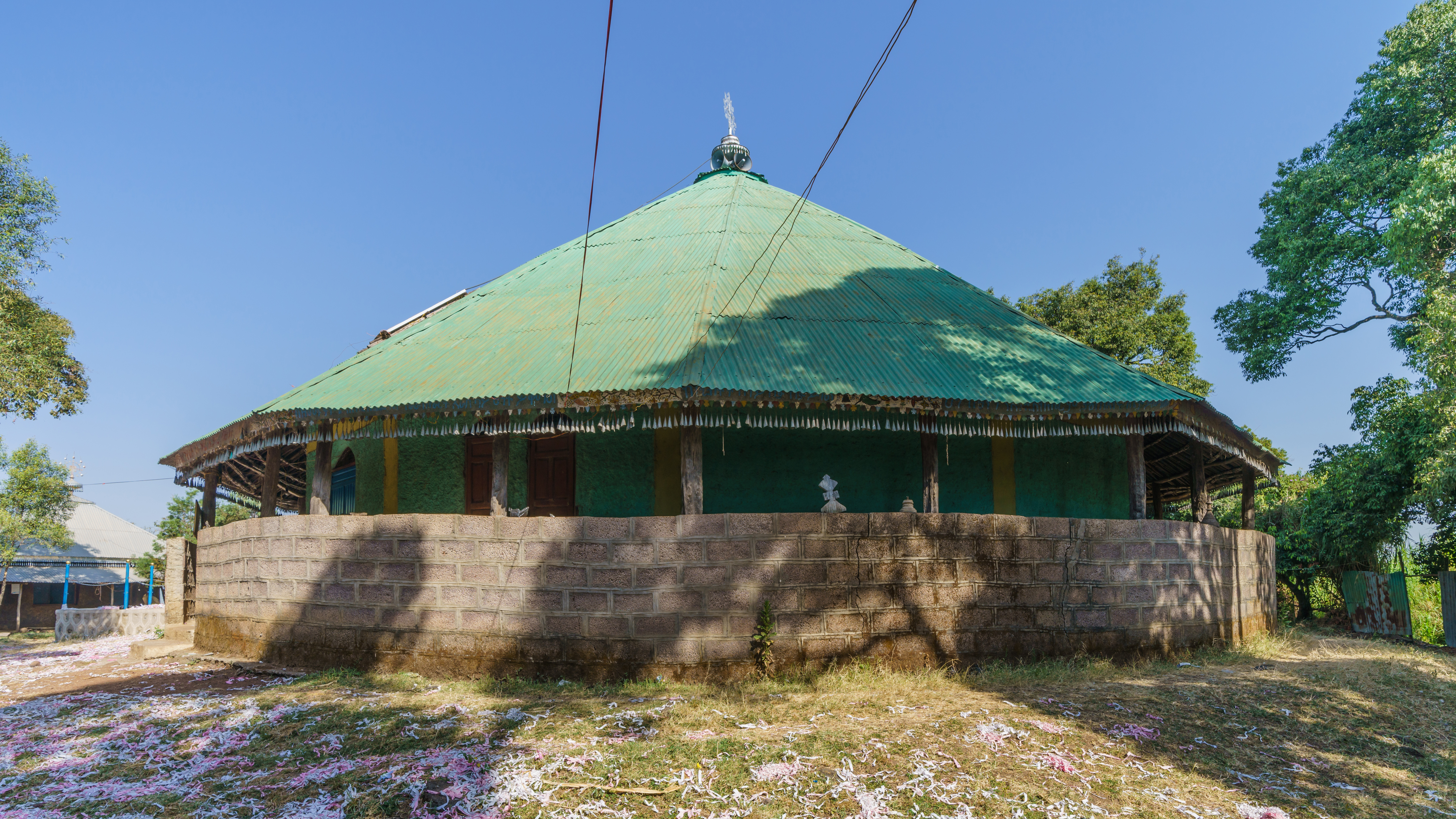
Debre Maryam Monastery

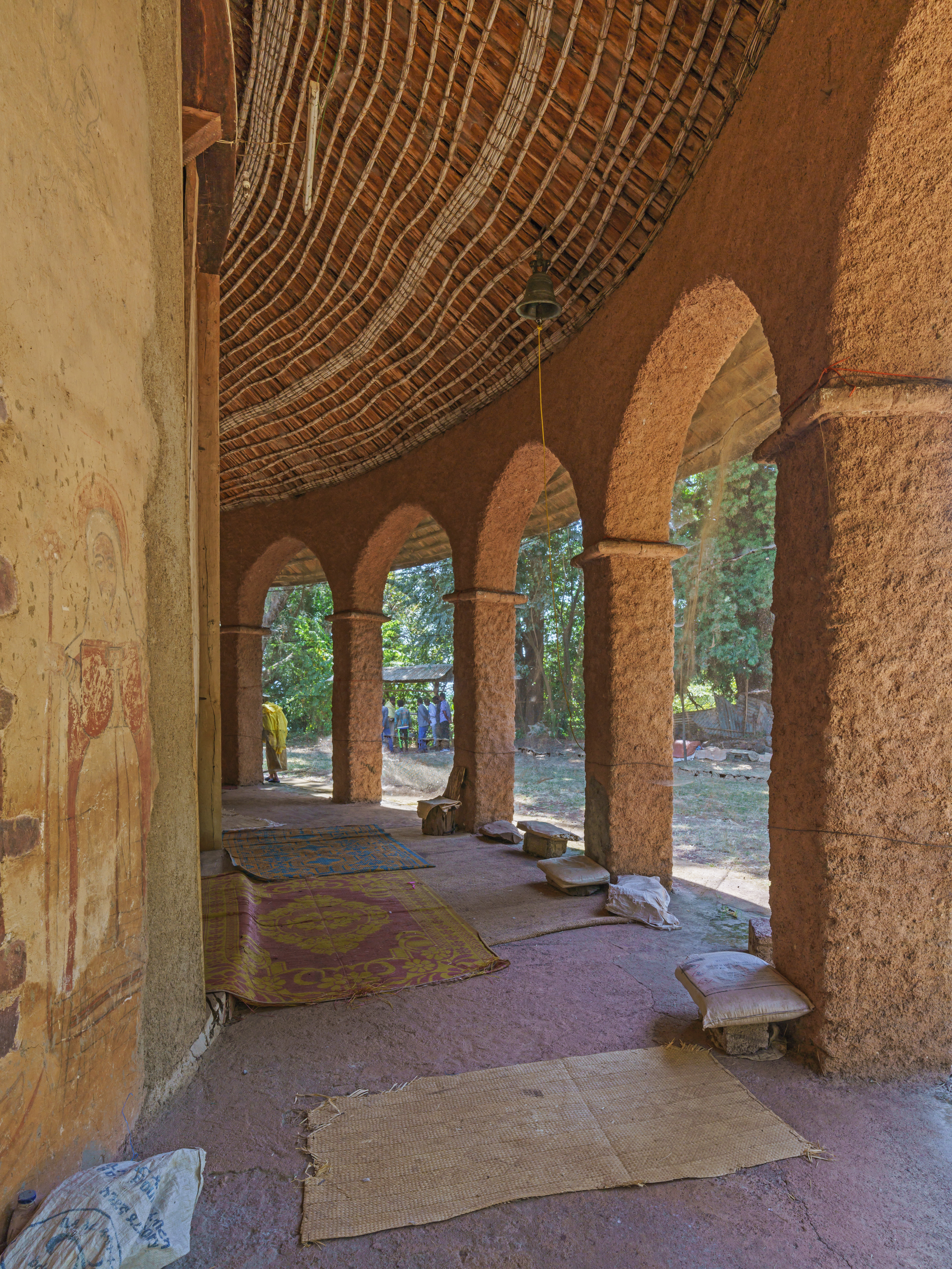
Kebran Gabriel Monastery

=== Debre Maryam ===
The monastery of Debre Maryam is one of the newer monasteries of Lake Tana, having been built by Emperor Tewodros in the 19th century.

=== Dega Estefanos ===
Set on a hill around 100m above the lake, a short trek up a winding path leads to one of the most sacred monasteries, the monastery of Dega Estefanos. This monastery is of real historic interest, housing brightly coloured ceremonial robes, a 16th-century painting of the Madonna and the mummified remains of five Ethiopian emperors, displayed for visitors to view in modern, glass-sided coffins.

=== Narga Selassie ===
Narga Selassie, which means ‘Trinity of the Rest’, was built on Dek Island, the largest island of Lake Tana in the late 18th century. The church is one of the most peaceful and atmospheric on Lake Tana and is set in an extremely beautiful location.

=== Tana Cherkos ===
Tana Cherkos is a small island monastery where it is said the Ark of the Covenant was hidden for 800 years before being brought to its final resting place in Aksum. The shores of the island are covered with a dense forest strip which is home to majestic fish eagles. It takes around three hours to reach this monastery by boat from Bahir Dar.

=== Kebran Gabriel ===
While it is said to be one of the most beautiful and atmospheric of the monasteries of Lake Tana, the church of Kebran Gabriel is no longer open to the public. The monastery was founded in the 14th century and rebuilt in the 17th century. It is located the closest to Bahir Dar. The round roof is supported by twelve pillars made from carved stones symbolizing the twelve apostles.

== Monasteries on the Zege Peninsula ==
The Zege peninsula, which is covered by a dense tropical forest and of mainly by the endemic plant of coffee, is situated to the south west edge of lake Tana some 20 km on land and 15 km on water from the town of Bahir Dar (the capital city of Amhara Regional state of Ethiopia). Monasteries with immense historical and cultural interest history tell us that Lake Tana had been serving as a link between Ethiopia and the ancient world the ancient Greek called it as "Copper Tinted Lake" or "the jewel of Ethiopia". Hermits seeking seclusion from the mundane world founded early Ethiopian orthodox Christian monasteries among the shores of Lake Tana and on the different island since the 4th century. Mehal Zege Giyorgis monastery is the pioneer among the seven historic and ancient churches on the Zeghie peninsula and was built in the 13th century. Women are not allowed entry to some monasteries.

=== Bete Maryam ===
Bete Maryam Monastery located on the Zege Peninsula not far from Bahir Dar.

=== Azuwa Maryam ===
This round church has a thatched roof which makes it one of the most attractive churches around Lake Tana.

=== Bete Selassie & Tekla Haimanot ===
Just a 45-minute walk uphill from the shore takes you to these two hidden treasures. These two monasteries are slightly off the beaten track, making a trip to see the vivid frescoes inside even more special. Only men are permitted to enter the Bete Selassie monastery due to religious reasons.

=== Saint George Monastery ===
Mehal Zege Giyorgis monastery founded during the 13th century and rebuilt by plastered round wall with conical thatched roof, a typical example of the Ethiopian Orthodox church, is found hidden within the mangrove forest of the Zeghie peninsula. According to the hagiography, the founder was Abune Betre Mariam, one of the seven stars (Ethiopian saints) who had devoted their entire life to expanding the monasteries on the islands and shores of Lake Tana. Its sisterly Abune Betre Mariyam churches possess a museum with icons, mural paintings, crowns crosses, vestments, illuminating manuscripts, and others. The museum is known especially for its particular types of manuscripts known as an iron cloth of the founding saint (Abune Betre Mariam) illuminated manuscripts and other invaluable antiques.

=== Ura Kidane Mehret ===
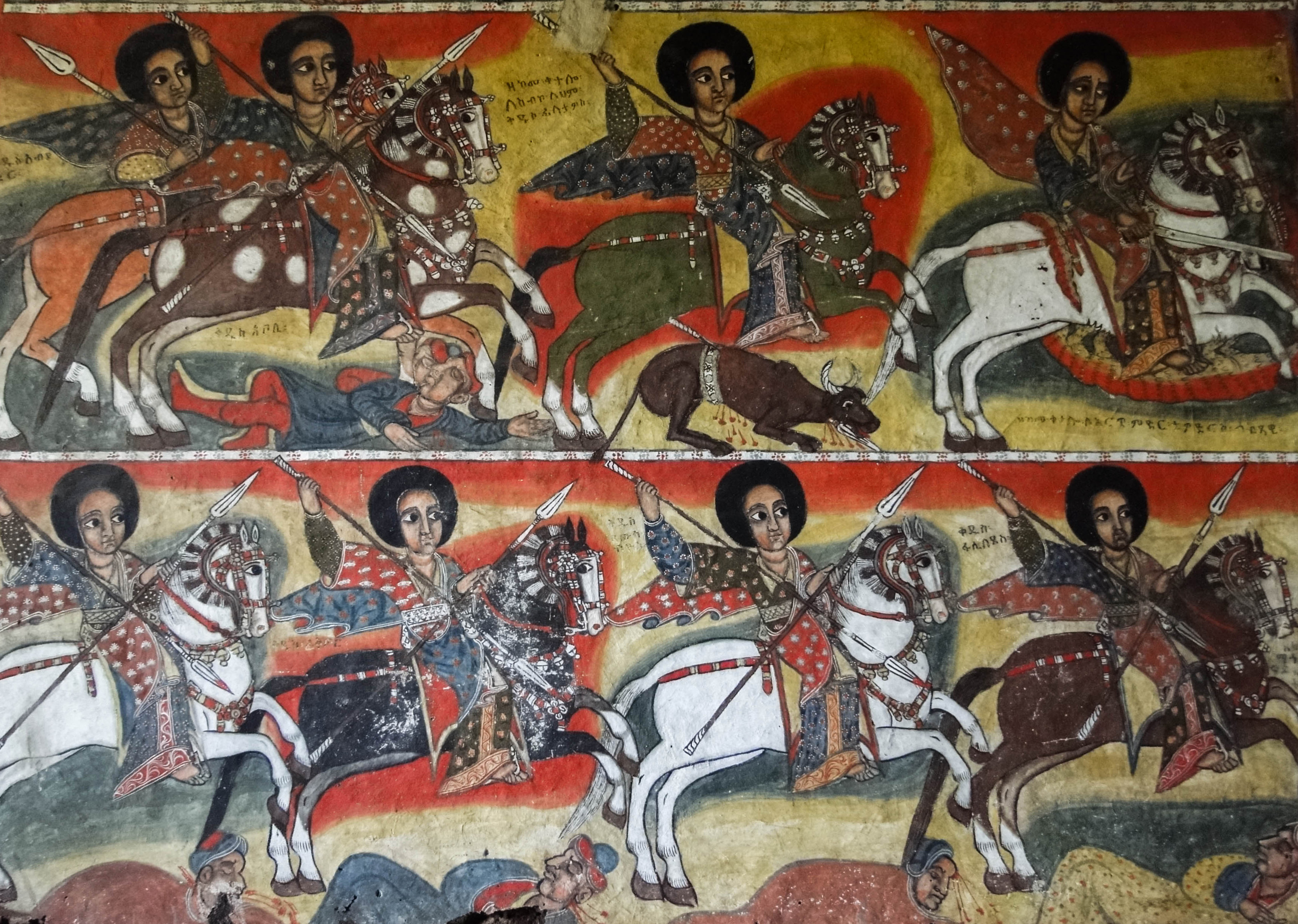
Ura Kidane Mehret Church - Painting 02

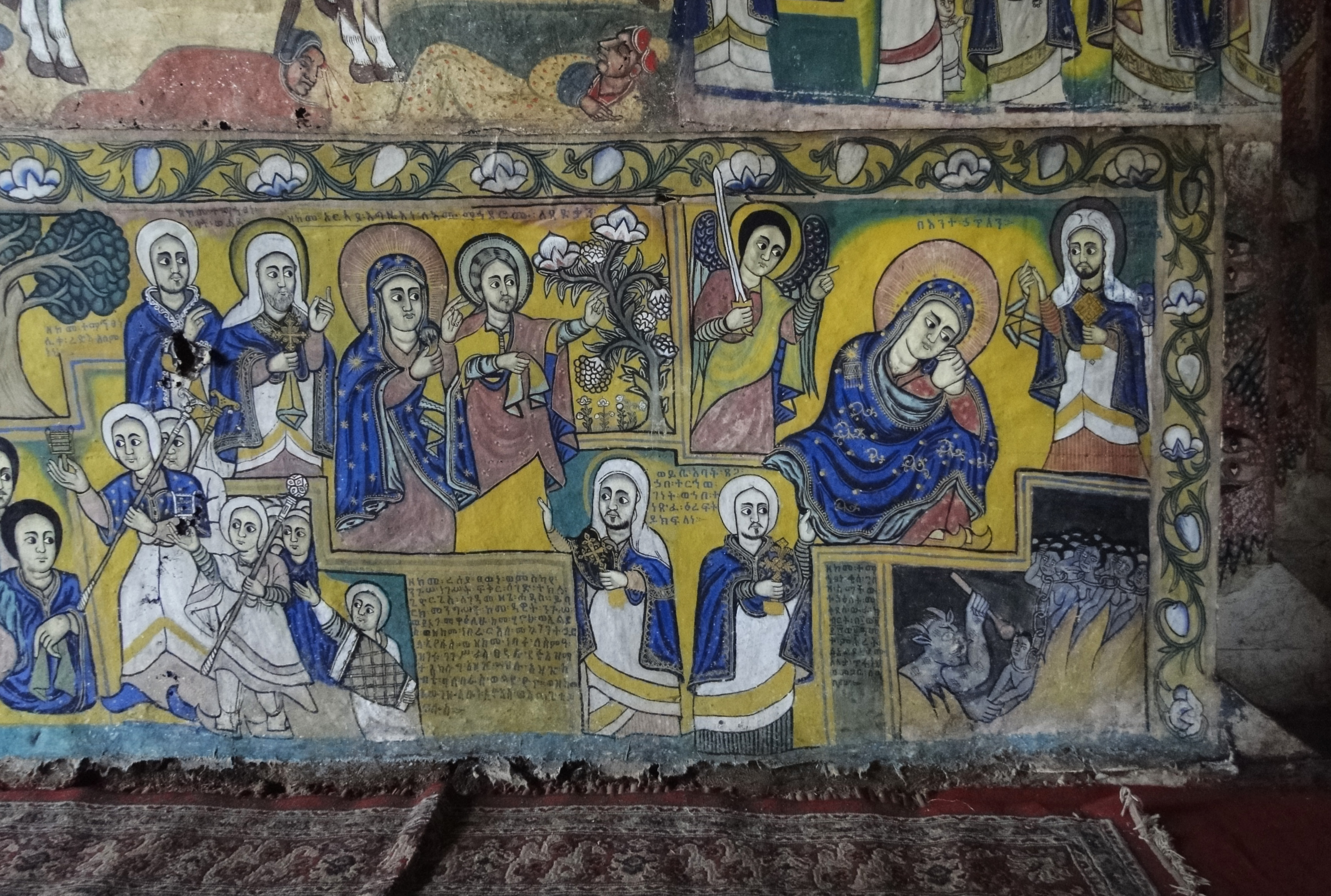
Ura Kidane Mehret Church - Painting 03

Ura Kidane Mehret is a church of the Ethiopian Orthodox Church, located on the Zege peninsula in Lake Tana of Ethiopia. It is part of the complex of the Convent of Mercy. At least one author considers it the most attractive church in the Lake Tana region. It has been said that the inside of the Ura Kidane Mehret monastery is the most impressive and beautiful in the whole region. The monastery is highly decorated with beautifully painted, colourful and vibrant frescoes depicting Ethiopian saints and the history of the Ethiopian-Orthodox Church. Both men and women are permitted to enter and there is also a small museum, the Zeghie Satekela Museum, for visitors to learn about hand-crafted objects and musical instruments that are still used by the local communities today.

The convent was founded in the 14th century by the saint Betre Mariyam (Amharic "Rod of Mary"), although the present circular church dates from the 16th century. Its interior is decorated with numerous murals painted between 100 and 250 years ago; subjects include Negus Tekle Haymanot of Gojjam and his followers. The most significant were painted by Alaqa Engida during the reign of Emperor Menelik II. The church has its treasury in a nearby outbuilding, which contains the richly embroidered robes of Negus Tekle Haymanot and his wife Laqetch Gegre Mehdin, as well as the crowns of Emperor Yohannes IV, Emperor Tewodros II, Negus Tekle Haymanot, and Emperor Tekle Giyorgis.
