= March Hare (festival) =

Poetry festival named after the character in Carroll's book

The March Hare is a former poetry festival in Corner Brook, Newfoundland, and was the largest poetry festival in Atlantic Canada prior to 2018. It started in 1987 or 1988 as an evening of poetry and entertainment at the Blomidon Golf and Country Club in Corner Brook, Newfoundland and Labrador, designed to appeal to a general audience. The March Hare takes its name from the character in Lewis Carroll's Alice's Adventures in Wonderland. According to Rex Brown, the name is also intended as a pun on the words here (celebrating a sense of place) and hear (since its focus is the spoken word).

The Hare took place in March each year. Loosely associated with the Grenfell Campus of Memorial University through the leadership of poet-organizer Al Pittman and the involvement of other writers who taught at Grenfell, the Hare was equally the brain-child of teacher Rex Brown and club manager George Daniels.

Although still anchored in Corner Brook, each year, the March Hare travelled to St. John's and Gander, Newfoundland. The event also took place in Toronto, Ontario, and other venues, provincial, national and international. In 2007, The March Hare visited seven centres in Ireland, including Dublin and Waterford. In 2011, March Hares were put off in Rocky Harbour, Newfoundland, and Halifax, Nova Scotia.

The March Hare featured a plethora of authors, from Corner Brook (and Newfoundland) and from outside the province (and outside of Canada). Authors featured at the Hare include Stephanie McKenzie, Michael Ondaatje, Jemma L King, Alistair MacLeod, Paul Durcan, Lorna Crozier, Patrick Lane, Susan Musgrave, Stephen Reid, Eiléan Ní Chuilleanáin, Wayne Johnston, Stan Dragland, Ron Hynes, Michael Crummey, Emiko Miyashita, Glen Sorestad, Michael Winter, Louise Halfe (Sky Dancer), John Ennis, Lisa Moore, and many others. Early contributors to the March Hare included Al Pittman, John Steffler, Randall Maggs, Adrian Fowler, David "Smoky" Elliott, Des Walsh, Clyde Rose, Nick Avis, and Pamela Morgan.

In 2017, organizer Rex Brown announced that 2018 would be his last year running the festival. It held its final event at Corner Brook in March 2018, after a tour that included stops in New York City, Ontario, Nova Scotia and other locations in Newfoundland.
