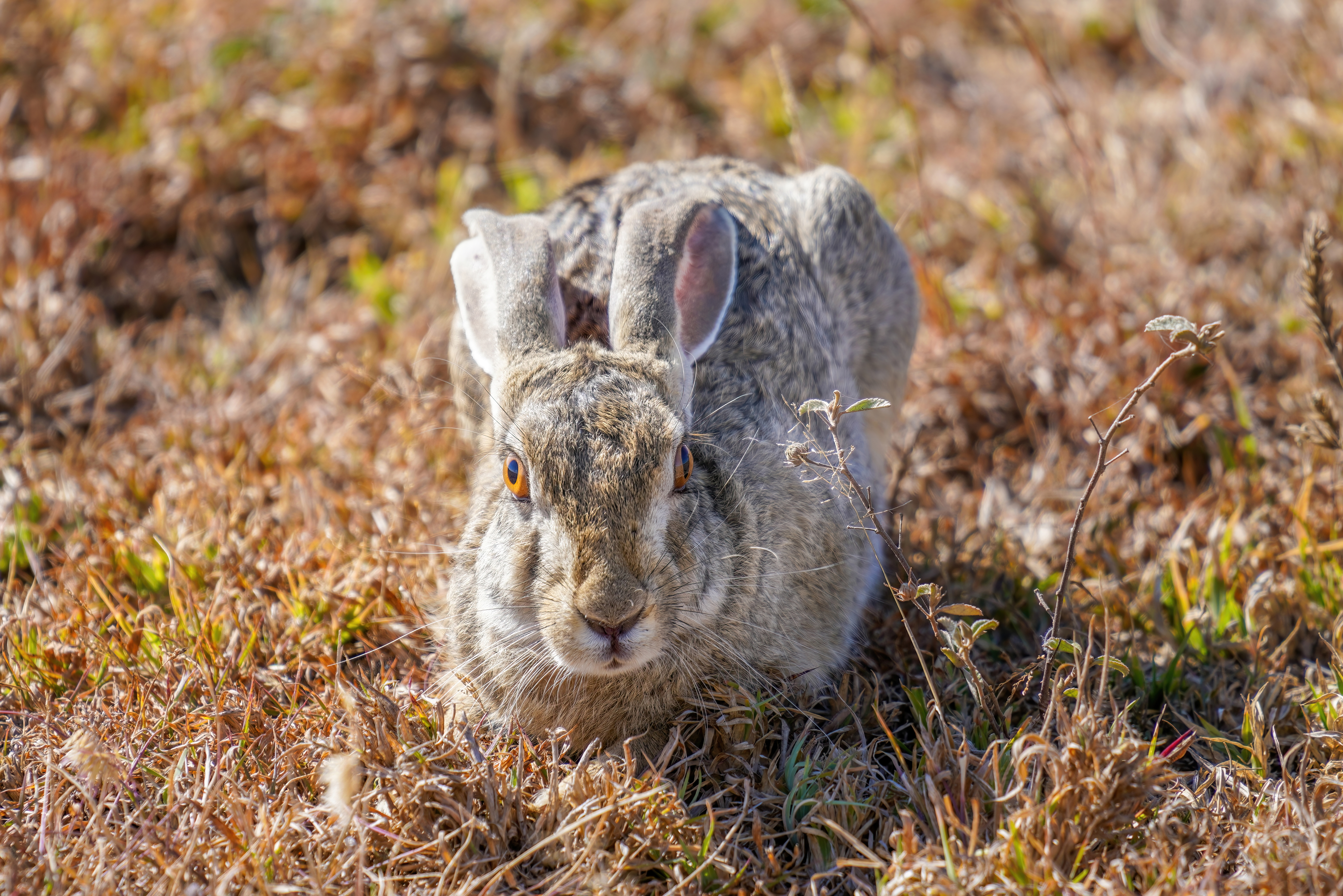

Conservation status
- Least Concern (IUCN 3.1)

Scientific classification
- Kingdom: Animalia
- Phylum: Chordata
- Class: Mammalia
- Order: Lagomorpha
- Family: Leporidae
- Genus: Lepus
- Species: L. victoriae

Binomial name
- Lepus victoriae Thomas, 1893
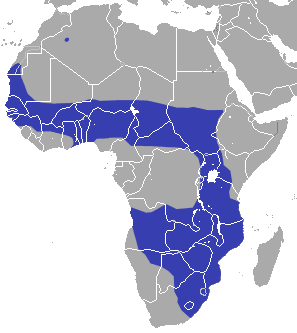
- African savanna hare range

Synonyms
- Lepus crawshayi de Winton, 1899 Lepus microtis Heuglin, 1865

= African savanna hare =

Species of mammal

The African savanna hare (Lepus victoriae) is a mammal species in the family Leporidae, native to Africa. It is listed as "least concern" on the IUCN Red List.

== Distribution and habitat ==
It is native to diverse regions and habitats of Africa, including savannas and the Sahel. It is found in Algeria, Botswana, Burundi, Chad, the Democratic Republic of the Congo, Côte d'Ivoire, Ethiopia, the Gambia, Ghana, Guinea, Guinea-Bissau, Kenya, Libya, Mali, Mauritania, Morocco, Mozambique, Namibia, Niger, Nigeria, Rwanda, Senegal, Sierra Leone, Somalia, South Africa, Sudan, Tanzania, Tunisia, Uganda, and Zambia.

== Description ==
The African savanna hare is a medium-sized species growing to a length of between 41 and 58 cm (16 and 23 in) with a weight of between 1.5 and 3 kilograms (3.3 and 6.6 lb). The ears have black tips, the dorsal surface of head and body is greyish-brown, the flanks and limbs are reddish-brown and the underparts are white. The general colouring is richer in tone than other hares, especially in mountain regions where the hares are a rather darker shade. The tail is black above and white below. This hare looks very similar to the Cape hare in appearance but can be told apart by its distinctively grooved incisors.

== Behaviour ==
African savanna hares are solitary, nocturnal animals. They rely on camouflage to stay hidden, but can run at up to 70 kilometres (43 mi) an hour and sometimes leap vigorously sideways to break the scent trail they are leaving. They feed mainly on grasses and herbs but also chew roots, shoots and bark and sometimes eat fallen fruit and occasionally fungi. They engage in coprophagy, eating their own dry faecal pellets so as to extract further nutrients from them.

The breeding behaviour of African savanna hares has been little studied. They seem to reproduce at any time of year and the female gives birth to several litters during the year. The young are born in the open and able to run soon after birth. The mother seems to separate them and visits each one at intervals to allow them to suckle. They are weaned when about a month old.

== See also ==
- Hare
