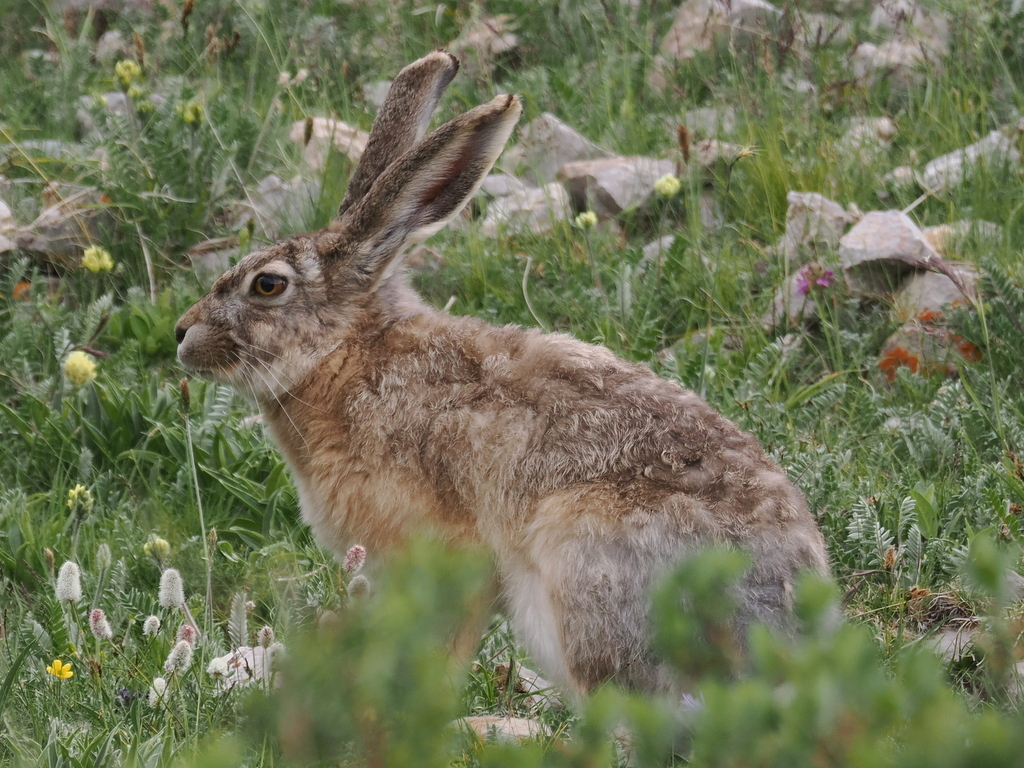
- Dulan County, Qinghai, China

Conservation status
- Least Concern (IUCN 3.1)

Scientific classification
- Kingdom: Animalia
- Phylum: Chordata
- Class: Mammalia
- Order: Lagomorpha
- Family: Leporidae
- Genus: Lepus
- Species: L. oiostolus

Binomial name
- Lepus oiostolus Hodgson, 1840
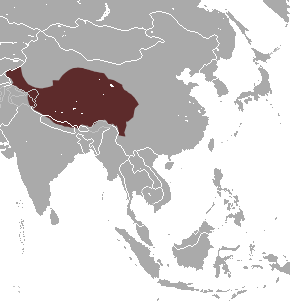
- Woolly hare range

Synonyms
- List: Lepus diostolus Hodgson, 1841; Lepus pallipess Hodgson, 1842; Lepus oemodias J. E. Gray, 1847; Lepus diostolus Blanford, 1875; Lepus sechuenensis de Winton, 1899; Lepus sechuensis Lyon, 1904; Lepus kozlovi Satunin, 1907; Lepus przewalskii Satunin, 1907; Lepus oiostolus tsaidamensis Hilzheimer, 1910; Lepus oiostolus illuteus O. Thomas, 1914; Lepus grahami A. B. Howell, 1928; Lepus qinghaiensis Cai Guiquan & Feng Zuojian, 1982; Lepus qusongensis Cai Guiquan & Feng Zuojian, 1982

= Woolly hare =

Species of mammal

The woolly hare (Lepus oiostolus) (Chinese: 高原兔; pinyin: Gaoyuan tu) is a thick-furred species of hare found in the montane grasslands of western and central China, northern India, and Nepal. It is a medium- to large-sized hare with fur that varies in colour with location, from sandy yellow to light brown. Among the Chinese hares, it has the largest ears. Whitish rings around the eyes and an elongated muzzle are distinctive features of the woolly hare. Being a nocturnal species, the hare will forage for grasses and herbs at night and rest under shelter during the day.

Woolly hares are threatened by habitat destruction and are hunted for their meat and fur. Dense hare populations are reportedly sparsely distributed, and though it has a wide range and is present in some protected areas, it is a generally uncommon species. The International Union for Conservation of Nature has assessed it as a least-concern species, though it is considered endangered in India and listed as a protected wild animal in China.

== Taxonomy and etymology ==
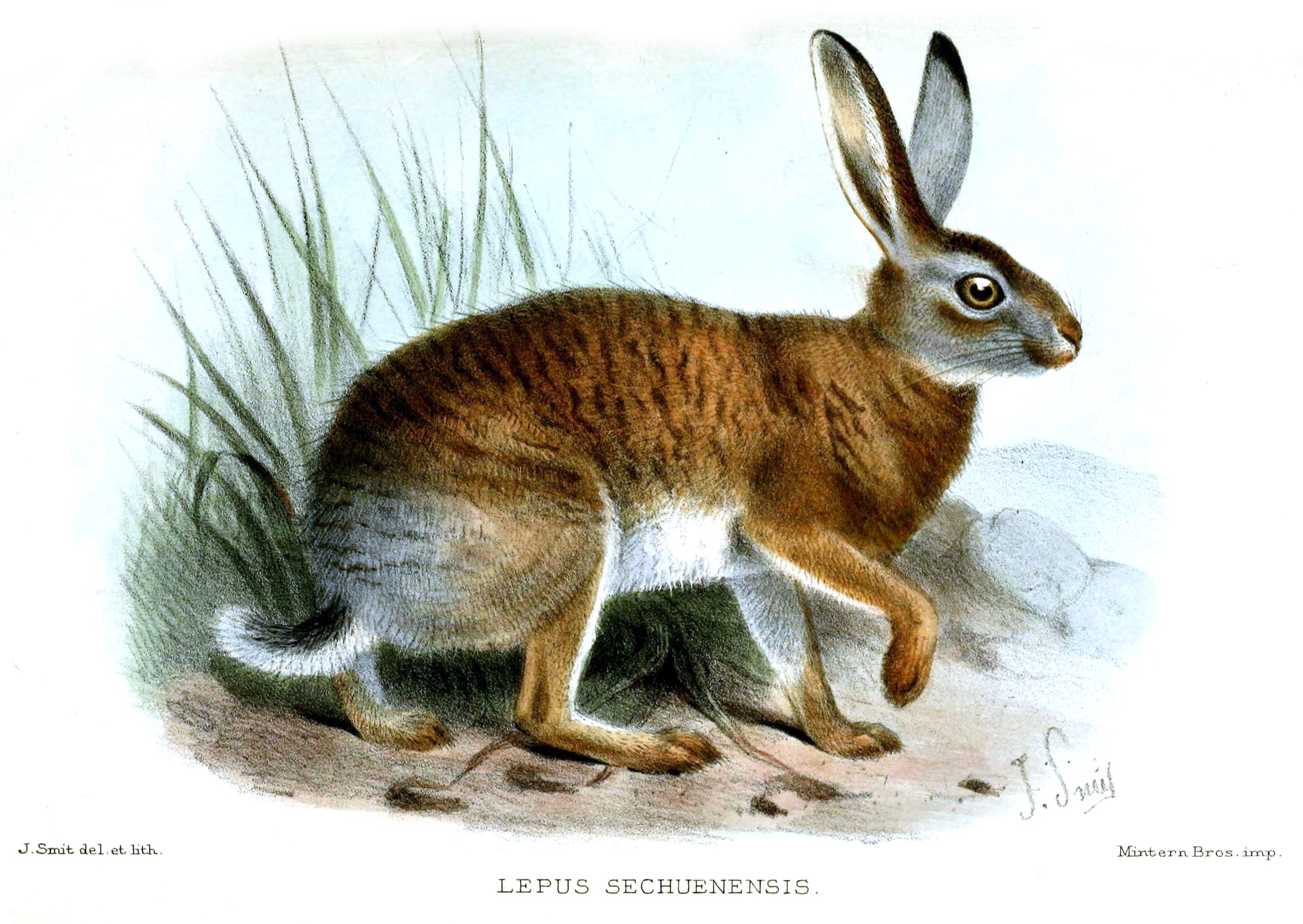
Illustration of the woolly hare by Joseph Smit, 1899

The woolly hare was described in 1840 under the scientific name Lepus oiostolus by the British zoologist Brian Houghton Hodgson, placing it in the existing genus of hares, Lepus. At the time, Hodgson was seeking to provide evidence that the hares known from the Gangetic provinces differed from those in England, and that in these Gangetic hares there was no difference between those found in the plains and those from the hills of the Sub-Himalayan Range. Much of his account describes the Indian hare (Lepus nigricollis), which he calls L. macrotus; in a letter sent the month following his account, Hodgson offered a correction with the apparently correct names, which was published alongside his original article. The woolly hare was described briefly in a single paragraph in Hodgson's account, as he had only possessed "some wretched remains" from Tibet. The species name oiostolus is reminiscent of the Ancient Greek οὖλος (oûlos), meaning 'woolly'.

Several subspecies of the woolly hare have been described, though many have been discounted by later research. Hodgson wrote an account of the species Lepus pallipes two years later, which would later be considered as the subspecies L. o. pallipes. Another species, Lepus hypsibius, was described in 1875 by William Thomas Blanford; he would reconsider this species, as well as Lepus pallipes, to be varieties of the woolly hare in 1898. Two subspecies—L. o. kozlovi and L. o. przewalskii—were described in 1907 by Konstantin Satunin as distinct species. Another subspecies, L. o. grahami, was described in 1928 by Alfred Brazier Howell (as Lepus grahami). The woolly hare's systematics were clarified by Guiquan Cai and Zuojian Feng in 1982, when they noted the distinguishing characteristics of each woolly hare subspecies and added two new names, L. o. qinghaiensis and L. o. qusongensis. The species' subgenus is either Proeulagus, according to A. A. Gureev, or Eulagos, according to Alexander Averianov. The Yunnan hare (Lepus comus), also part of Eulagos, was once a subspecies of the woolly hare. Studies on the ecology and physical characteristics of the Yunnan hare led to its classification as a separate species in the 1980s.

Robert S. Hoffmann and Andrew T. Smith's work in the third edition of Mammal Species of the World, published in 2005, reworked the woolly hare's systematics and placed it into four subspecies:

- Lepus oiostolus oiostolus Hodgson, 1840
- Lepus oiostolus hypsibius Blanford, 1875
- Lepus oiostolus pallipes Hodgson, 1842
- Lepus oiostolus przewalskii Satunin, 1907

A common characteristic between the various subspecies was that they were largely based on external characteristics, and little molecular analysis had been done to clarify differences between them. Additionally, it was unclear if there were any differences in geographic distribution between the subspecies. A 2016 species account by Stéphanie C. Schai-Braun and Klaus Hackländer noted that each subspecies was apparently present throughout the species' continuous distribution and that distinctions between them may be unreasonable. Two years later, another account by Andrew T. Smith was published that did not recognise any subspecies; this was maintained in Smith and Johnston's 2019 assessment of the species for the International Union for Conservation of Nature.

=== Phylogenetics ===
The species' genome was sequenced in 2024. According to molecular genetic analysis done in 2024 by Leandro Iraçabal and colleagues, it is closely related to the Yunnan hare, with which it forms a clade. Its sister clade is one formed from the European hare and several other hares found throughout Asia, Africa, and Europe.

- - - Lepus comus
    - Lepus oiostolus
  - - - - - Lepus europaeus
          - Lepus habessinicus
        - Lepus granatensis
      - - - Lepus hainanus
          - Lepus peguensis
        - Lepus nigricollis
- Other hares

== Description ==
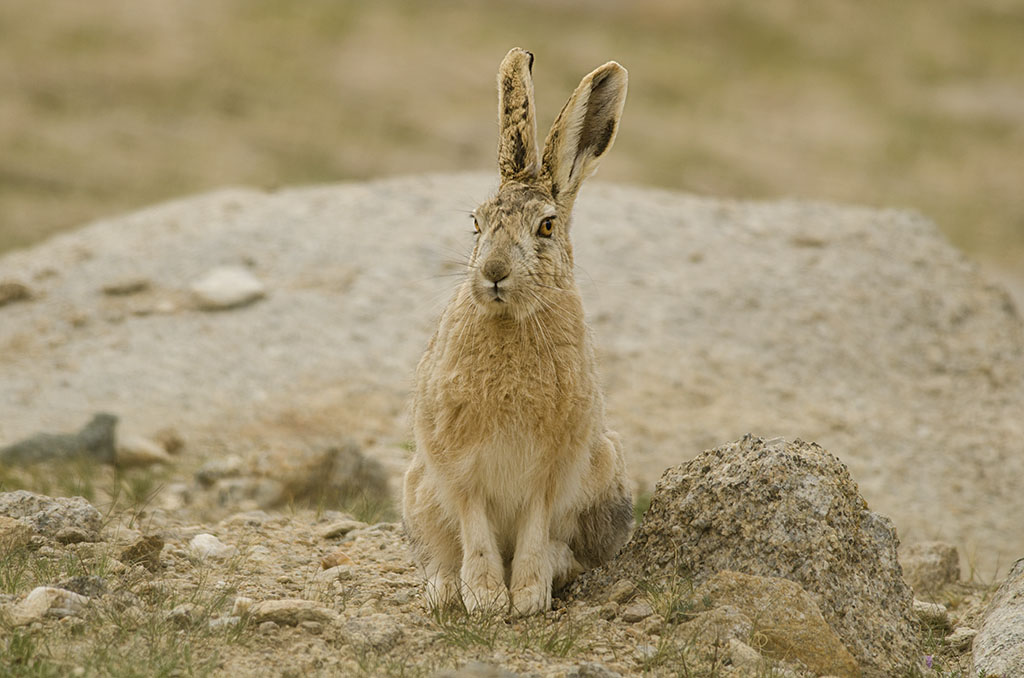
In Pologongka, Ladakh, India

The woolly hare is a medium- to large-sized hare. It has a head-body length of 40 to 58 centimetres (16 to 23 inches), an average weight of 2.4 to 3 kilograms (5.3 to 6.6 pounds), ears that measure from 11 to 16 cm (4.3 to 6.3 in), and hind feet roughly 10 to 14 cm (3.9 to 5.5 in) long. It has whitish rings around the eyes. Males are slightly smaller than females. Among the Chinese hares, the woolly hare has the largest ears, which are darker at the tip compared to the base. The auditory bullae, the bone structures that enclose the inner ear, are small. Like other leporids, it has a dental formula of 2.0.3.31.0.2.3 × 2 = 28—two pairs of upper and one pair of lower incisors, no canines, three upper and two lower premolars on each side, and three upper and lower molars on either side of the jaw.

Its thick and soft fur varies widely in colour across its distribution, from sandy yellow to light brown. Its fur is especially long and curly, having a woolly appearance, which gives the hare its name. Compared to the hare's back and rump areas, the fur on its underside and near the hips is lighter in colour. Its abdominal fur is mostly white, and can have a light brown line along the mid-ventral line. The hare's tail is white above and below, except for a brown-gray narrow stripe on the dorsal surface, and measures roughly 6.5 to 12.5 cm (2.6 to 4.9 in) in length. Its muzzle is elongated and narrow, and its fur coat is moulted just once a year.

== Distribution and habitat ==
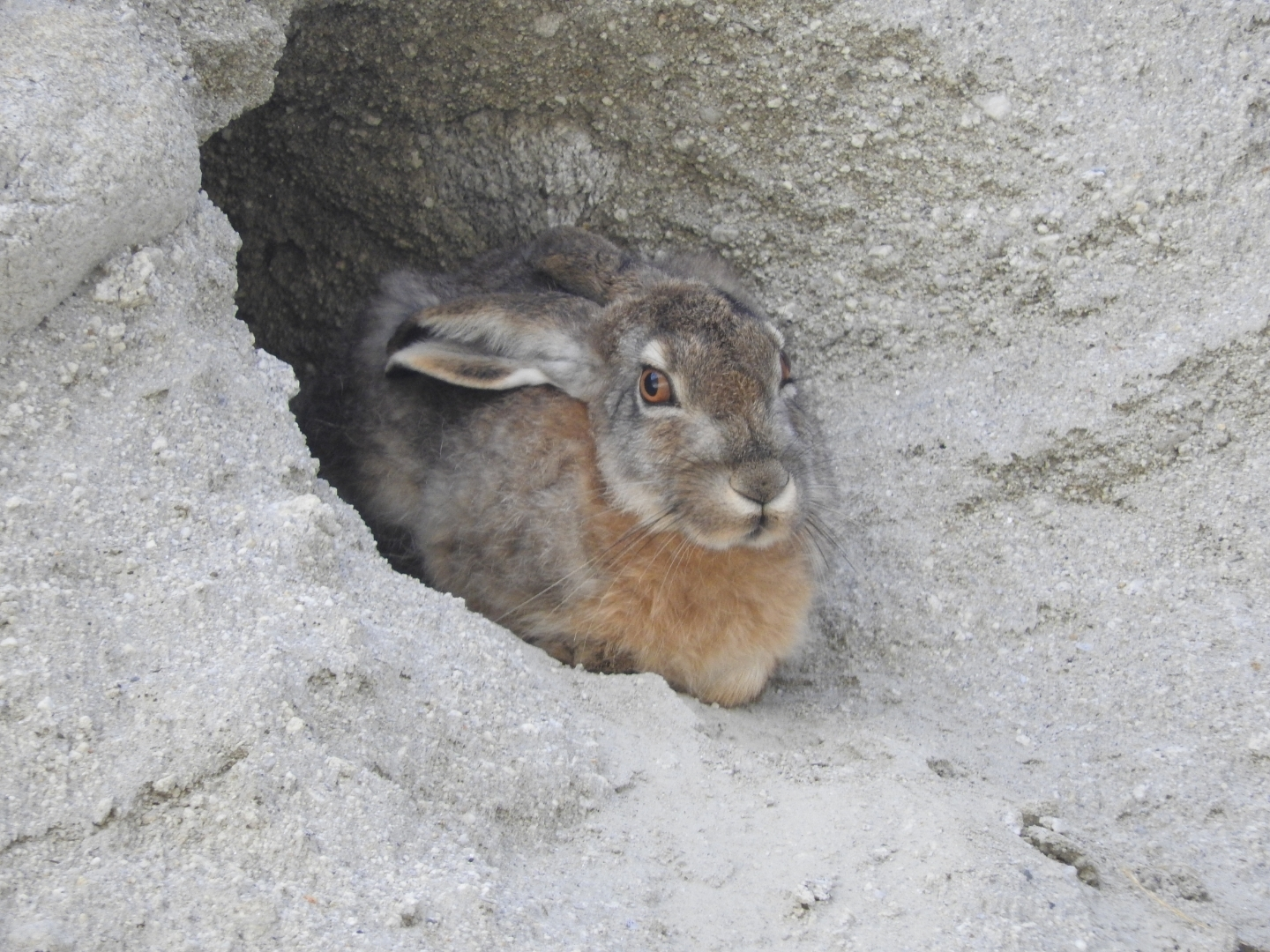
A resting woolly hare in Mustang District, Nepal

The woolly hare is native to Central Asia, being found throughout most of the Tibetan Plateau. Its range extends from the border regions of northern Nepal and India (including Sikkim and Ladakh) to western and central China, where it is present in the provinces of Gansu, Qinghai, Sichuan, the Tibet Autonomous Region and Xinjiang.

The woolly hare mainly inhabits high altitude grasslands. It lives in alpine meadows, shrubby meadows, and upland cold deserts, but it also occurs in coniferous or mixed montane woodland. In grassland habitats, the hare requires some amount of low-lying vegetation, such as shrubs, for use as shelter. Regions with degraded vegetation caused by extensive woodcutting have smaller hare populations due to a lack of available food. It has been found at altitudes ranging from 2,500 to 5,400 metres (8,200 to 17,700 feet) above sea level. Preferred woolly hare habitats in Tibet are dominated by silky rose (Rosa sericea), barberry (Berberis hemleyana), and Wilson juniper (Sabina pingii) plants.

== Behaviour and ecology ==
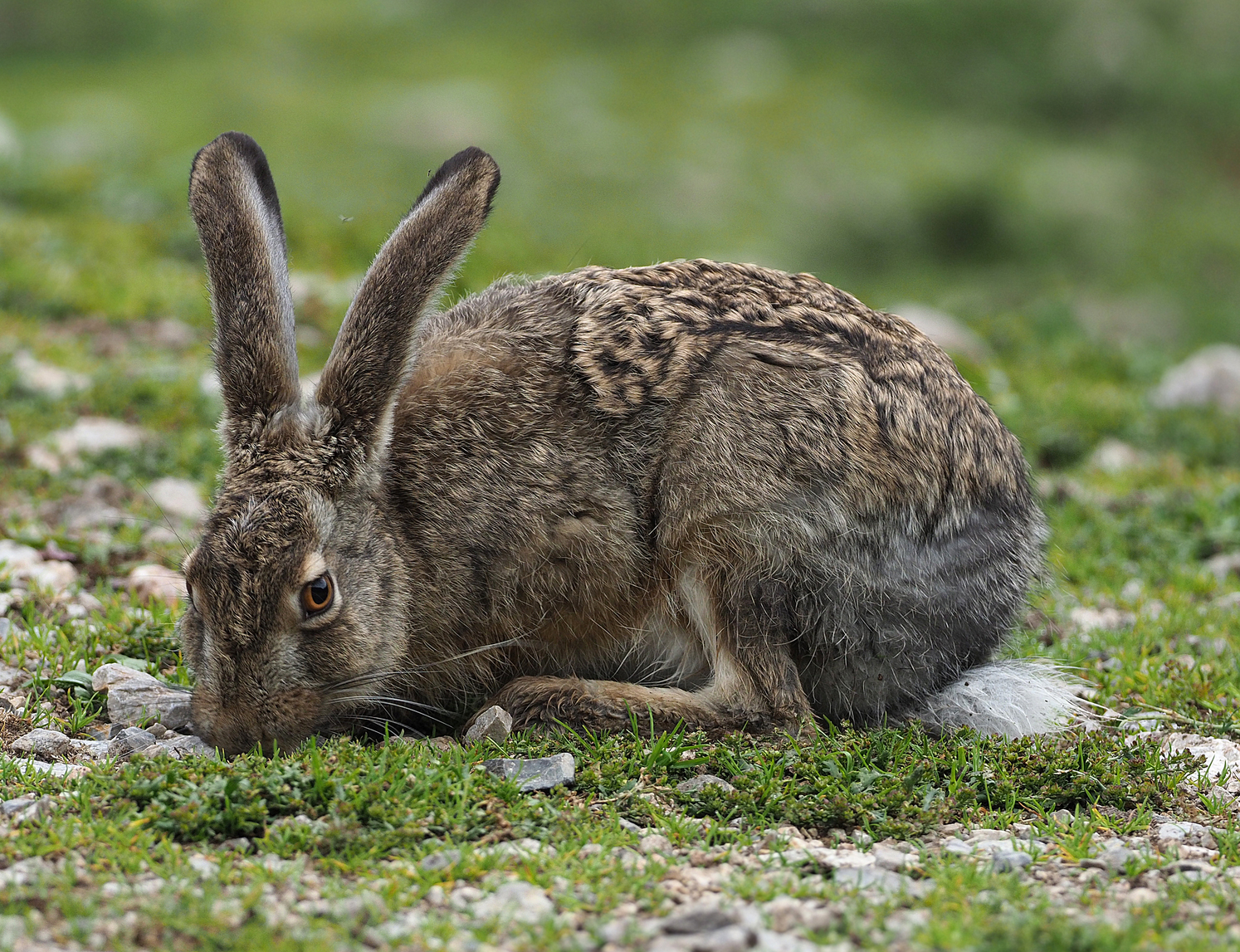
Feeding in Qumarlêb County, Qinghai, China

A shy and usually solitary animal, the woolly hare is mostly nocturnal, but it has been recorded during the daytime. It feeds on grasses and herbs, with individual animals returning regularly at night to the same foraging areas. During the day it sometimes rests in the sun in a sheltered position. The breeding season starts in April, with each female producing an average of three young annually over two litters. Woolly hare populations generally have equal numbers of male and female members, and up to half of the population's size may be made up of the young. A study in Tibet reported population densities ranging from 13 to up to 27 hares per square kilometre, with hares being much more abundant in the autumn (when the highest densities were recorded) compared to the spring (the lowest).

Several predators and parasites make use of woolly hares, with the species' main predators being birds of prey. Golden eagles and Eurasian eagle-owls prey upon woolly hares regularly, as do Siberian weasels. One species of tapeworm, Echinococcus multilocularis, is thought to use the woolly hare as an intermediate host. Hare species are often subject to cyclical population changes, as is most well known in the snowshoe hare (L. americanus), and the woolly hare is thought to experience similar population cycles due to predation, food availability, and disease, with the latter causing dramatic but infrequent die-offs.

== Conservation status ==
The woolly hare has a wide range but is a generally uncommon species, and its population is described as "very low except in a few favoured areas" in Smith and Johnston's 2019 assessment of the species. It is hunted for its meat and fur, and in some areas suitable habitat is being destroyed, resulting in fragmenting of populations and the inability of individuals to make local migrations. In Nepal and China, it is present in some protected areas. The International Union for Conservation of Nature considers it as being a least-concern species, though in India it is considered endangered. In China, it has been listed on the 2023 List of Terrestrial Wildlife with Important Ecological, Scientific and Social Values.
