= Mark Boyce (ecologist) =

American academic

Mark Boyce FRSC
- Born: May 24, 1950 (age 76)
- Education: Yale University; University of Alaska Fairbanks; Iowa State University
- Spouse: Dr. Evelyn H. Merrill
- Scientific career
- Workplaces: University of Alberta; University of Wisconsin–Stevens Point; University of Wyoming
- Thesis: Life Histories in Variable Environments: Applications to Geographic Variation in the Muskrat (Ondatra zibethicus) (1977)
- Doctoral advisor: Richard Samuel Miller
- Other academic advisors: Samuel J. Harbo Jr.
- Website: apps.ualberta.ca/directory/person/boyce

Mark Stephen Boyce is a Canadian-American ecologist and conservation biologist known for his research in wildlife population ecology, habitat selection, resource selection functions, and the application of mathematical models to wildlife management. He is a professor in the Department of Biological Sciences at the University of Alberta, where he holds the Alberta Conservation Association Chair in Fisheries and Wildlife, an endowed chair renewed in 2022. He was elected a Fellow of the Royal Society of Canada in 2014 and was named a Fellow of The Wildlife Society in 2012.

== Early life and education ==
Boyce grew up on a farm in northern Iowa, United States, where he developed an interest in wildlife, hunting, and fishing.

He studied at Iowa State University and subsequently earned a master's degree from the University of Alaska Fairbanks. He completed his Ph.D. at Yale University in 1977, conducting research on mammalian life histories and population ecology. He later undertook postdoctoral research at the University of Oxford through a NATO fellowship in 1982–1983.

== Career ==
Boyce began his academic career at the University of Wyoming, where he served as an instructor from 1976 to 1977, assistant professor from 1977 to 1981, associate professor from 1981 to 1987, and professor of zoology and physiology from 1987 to 1993. During this period, he was also a visiting professor in the Department of Mathematics from 1984 to 1985 and director of the UW–National Park Service Research Center from 1989 to 1993.

He held a NATO Postdoctoral Research Fellowship at the Animal Ecology Research Group in the Department of Zoology at the University of Oxford from 1982 to 1983. He was a Fulbright Scholar to India from 1991 to 1992 and was affiliated with the Indian Institute of Science in Bangalore.

In 1993, Boyce joined the University of Wisconsin–Stevens Point as Vallier Chair of Ecology and Wisconsin Distinguished Professor, positions he held until 1999.

Since 1999, he has been Professor of Ecology at the University of Alberta, where he holds the Alberta Conservation Association Chair in Fisheries and Wildlife.

== Research ==
Boyce's research has focused on population ecology, conservation biology, landscape ecology, and wildlife management, with particular emphasis on habitat selection, animal movement, population dynamics, and wildlife conservation. His work on resource selection functions (RSFs) examined how habitat-selection models can be evaluated and applied at different spatial scales.

Boyce has conducted research on the greater sage-grouse (Centrocercus urophasianus), particularly habitat selection, reproductive success, and conservation in southeastern Alberta. In a 2007 study co-authored with Cameron Aldridge, he developed habitat-based models integrating species occurrence and reproductive performance to identify areas important for the persistence of endangered sage-grouse populations; the research informed debates over critical habitat protection under Canada's Species at Risk Act.

Boyce has also investigated the effects of livestock grazing on carbon sequestration and storage in North American grasslands. As principal investigator of a collaborative research program examining adaptive multi-paddock grazing, he studied how different grazing-management practices influence soil carbon, greenhouse gas emissions, and other ecosystem processes. Related research has examined changes in soil organic carbon associated with adaptive multi-paddock grazing.

Boyce co-authored work on step-selection functions and integrated step selection analysis (iSSA), an approach that jointly estimates movement and resource-selection parameters.

Boyce's 1992 review in Annual Review of Ecology and Systematics examined the use of demographic data and mathematical models to assess the likelihood of population persistence over time. Other work has examined concepts and statistical methods used to distinguish resource selection, use, choice, occupancy, and related measures in wildlife studies.

== Awards and recognition ==
- University Cup, 2026, University of Alberta
- Ian McTaggart Cowan Lifetime Achievement Award, 2025, Canadian Section of The Wildlife Society
- Sand County Society, Yale School of the Environment (2025)
- Stan Hodgkiss Canadian Outdoorsperson of the Year, Canadian Wildlife Federation (2023)
- Life Member, The Wildlife Society (2022)
- J. Gordin Kaplan Award for Research, University of Alberta (2021)
- C. Hart Merriam Award, 2017, American Society of Mammalogists
- Miroslaw Romanowski Medal, 2016, Royal Society of Canada
- Fellow of the Royal Society of Canada
- TWS Fellow, The Wildlife Society
- Killam Annual Professorship, 2011–12, University of Alberta
- Distinguished Professorship, 1993, 1999 University of Wisconsin System, Madison.
- Fulbright Scholar to India, 1992, U.S. Educational Foundation in India, Bangalore.
- N.A.T.O. Postdoctoral Fellowship, 1982–83, National Science Foundation, Univ. Oxford, UK
