= Felisa Smith =

American ecologist and academic

Felisa A. Smith
- Education: University of California, Irvine; University of California, San Diego; Laguna Beach High School
- Children: 2
- Scientific career
- Workplaces: University of New Mexico
- Thesis: Nutritional ecology and body size in Neotoma populations (1991)

Felisa A. Smith is an American ecologist who is a Distinguished Professor at the University of New Mexico. She is a conservation paleoecologist who uses fossil records to understand the pressing environmental issues such as the climate crisis and biodiversity loss. She has served as President of the American Society of Mammalogists and the International Biogeography Society. She was awarded the 2022 C. Hart Merriam Award by the American Society of Mammalogists and is a Fellow of the Paleontology Society.

== Early life and education ==
Smith's mother, Maria del Carmen Calvo Herrero, was an artist, and her father, Frank Smith, was a civil engineer. She studied biology, literature and visual arts at the University of California, San Diego. After graduating, Smith worked as a high school science teacher at Laguna Hills High School. Smith focused on ecology and evolutionary biology at the University of California, Irvine for her graduate studies. For her doctoral research, Smith investigated neotoma (pack rat) populations. She used fossils to understand whether pack rats obeyed Bergmann's rule, that the body size of a mammal is inversely proportional to the temperature of their environment.

== Research and career ==
Smith was a NSF Postdoctoral Fellow with James H. Brown. After some time as a research professor, Smith joined the tenure-track faculty at the University of New Mexico in 2006. She combines historic and fossil records with modern biology to understand the impact of climate change on biodiversity and the effects of loss of biodiversity on ecosystems. Her early work considered the abilities of small mammals to adapt to climate change. The paleomidden record provided Smith an opportunity to explore the relationship between rodent body size and temperature over 25,000 years. She showed that body size was linked to the size of fecal pellets, and used fossil fecal pellets to understand body size.

Smith has studied organisms across multiple sizes, from microbes to mammoths. For example, she has studied the fossil record during the megafauna extinction, and found that ratios of carbon and nitrogen stable isotopes in plants (δ^{13}C and δ^{15}N) had shifted, indicative of changing animal diets.

Between the pleistocene and holocene, Smith found that some animals grew larger and some got smaller. Moreover, the loss of megafauna led to shifts in the ecology and size of surviving mammals. She has argued that the ongoing biodiversity loss due to human activities and climate change could have the same impact megafauna. She has demonstrated that the offspring of carnivorous dinosaurs reduced species diversity by taking on the role of multiple species as they grew. Smith also showed that the loss of large mammals impacted biogeochemical cycles around the world, and contributed to the drop in methane which is associated with the Younger Dryas, a colder interval in the late Pleistocene.

== Awards and honors ==
In 2020, Smith was elected Fellow of the Paleontological Society. The following year, she was elected President of the American Society of Mammalogists and the International Biogeography Society. She was the first hispanic woman to hold such a position. In 2022, she was awarded the American Society of Mammalogists Merriam Award. In 2023, she was honored with the University of New Mexico Ovation Award, named the 68th Annual Research Lecturer and a Distinguished Professor.

== Selected publications ==
- Yadvinder Malhi; Christopher E Doughty; Mauro Galetti; Felisa A Smith; Jens-Christian Svenning; John W Terborgh (26 January 2016). "Megafauna and ecosystem function from the Pleistocene to the Anthropocene". Proceedings of the National Academy of Sciences of the United States of America. 113 (4): 838–46. Bibcode:2016PNAS..113..838M. doi:10.1073/pnas.1502540113. ISSN 0027-8424. PMC 4743772. PMID 26811442. Wikidata Q26774740.
- C. Josh Donlan; Joel Berger; Carl E. Bock; et al. (25 September 2006). "Pleistocene rewilding: an optimistic agenda for twenty-first century conservation". The American Naturalist. 168 (5): 660–681. doi:10.1086/508027. ISSN 0003-0147. PMID 17080364. Wikidata Q33262416.
- Virginie Millien; S Kathleen Lyons; Link Olson; Felisa A Smith; Anthony B Wilson; Yoram Yom-Tov (1 July 2006). "Ecotypic variation in the context of global climate change: revisiting the rules". Ecology Letters. 9 (7): 853–869. doi:10.1111/j.1461-0248.2006.00928.x. ISSN 1461-023X. PMID 16796576. Wikidata Q31046223.

== Personal life ==
Smith has two daughters, Emma, a historical geochemist, and Rosemary, a theoretical mathematician. She is married to Scott M. Elliott, a chemist at Los Alamos National Laboratory.
