= Habitat conservation =

Management practice for protecting types of environments

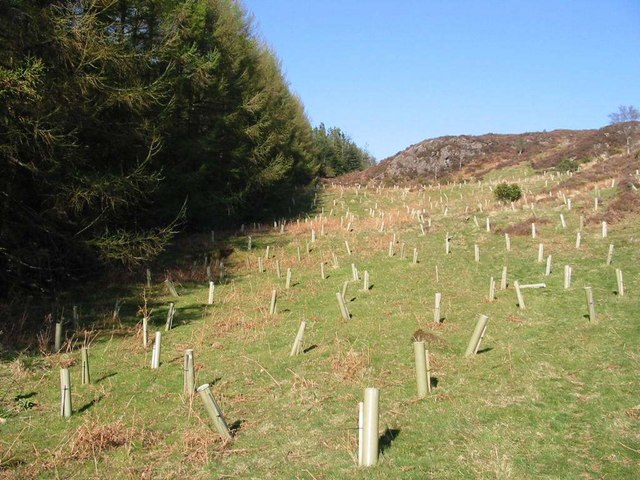
Tree planting is an aspect of habitat conservation. In each plastic tube a hardwood tree has been planted.

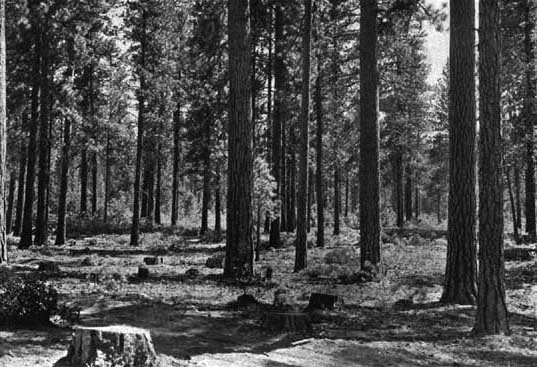
There are significant ecological benefits associated with selective cutting. Pictured is an area with Ponderosa Pine trees that were selectively harvested.

Habitat conservation is a management practice that seeks to conserve, protect and restore habitats and prevent species extinction, fragmentation or reduction in range. It is a priority of many groups that cannot be easily characterized in terms of any one ideology.

== History of the conservation movement ==
For much of human history, nature was seen as a resource that could be controlled by the government and used for personal and economic gain. The idea was that plants only existed to feed animals and animals only existed to feed humans. The value of land was limited only to the resources it provided such as fertile soil, timber, and minerals.

Throughout the 18th and 19th centuries, social views started to change and conservation principles were first practically applied to the forests of British India. The conservation ethic that began to evolve included three core principles: 1) human activities damage the environment, 2) there was a civic duty to maintain the environment for future generations, and 3) scientific, empirically based methods should be applied to ensure this duty was carried out. Sir James Ranald Martin was prominent in promoting this ideology, publishing numerous medico-topographical reports that demonstrated the damage from large-scale deforestation and desiccation, and lobbying extensively for the institutionalization of forest conservation activities in British India through the establishment of Forest Departments.

The Madras Board of Revenue started local conservation efforts in 1842, headed by Alexander Gibson, a professional botanist who systematically adopted a forest conservation program based on scientific principles. This was the first case of state conservation management of forests in the world. Governor-General Lord Dalhousie introduced the first permanent and large-scale forest conservation program in 1855, a model that soon spread to other colonies, as well to the United States, where Yellowstone National Park was opened in 1872 as the world's first national park.

Rather than focusing on the economic or material benefits from nature, humans began to appreciate the value of nature itself and the need to protect it. By the mid-20th century, countries such as the United States, Canada, and Britain instigated laws and legislation in order to ensure that the most fragile and beautiful environments would be protected for posterity.

Today, with the help of NGO's and governments worldwide, a movement is mobilizing with the goal of protecting habitats and preserving biodiversity on a global scale.

== Values of natural habitat ==
Natural habitats can provide Ecosystem services to humans, which are "any positive benefit that wildlife or ecosystems provide to people." The natural environment is a source for a wide range of resources that can be exploited for economic profit, for example timber is harvested from forests and clean water is obtained from natural streams. However, land development from anthropogenic economic growth often causes a decline in the ecological integrity of nearby natural habitat. For instance, this was an issue in the northern Rocky Mountains of the US.

However, there is also the economic value in conserving natural habitats. Financial profit can be made from tourist revenue, for example in the tropics where species diversity is high, or in recreational sports which take place in natural environments such as hiking and mountain biking. The cost of repairing damaged ecosystems is considered to be much higher than the cost of conserving natural ecosystems.

Measuring the worth of conserving different habitat areas is often criticized as being too utilitarian from a philosophical point of view.

== Biodiversity ==
Habitat conservation is important in maintaining biodiversity, which refers to the variability in populations, organisms, and gene pools, as well as habitats and ecosystems. Biodiversity is also an essential part of global food security. There is evidence to support a trend of accelerating erosion of the genetic resources of agricultural plants and animals. An increase in genetic similarity of agricultural plants and animals means an increased risk of food loss from major epidemics. Wild species of agricultural plants have been found to be more resistant to disease, for example the wild corn species Teosinte is resistant to 4 corn diseases that affect human grown crops. A combination of seed banking and habitat conservation has been proposed to maintain plant diversity for food security purposes. It has been shown that focusing conversation efforts on ecosystems "within multiple trophic levels" can lead to a better functioning ecosystem with more biomass.

== Classifying environmental values ==
Pearce and Moran outlined the following method for classifying environmental uses:

- Direct extractive uses: e.g. timber from forests, food from plants and animals
- Indirect uses: e.g. ecosystem services like flood control, pest control, erosion protection
- Optional uses: future possibilities e.g. unknown but potential use of plants in chemistry/medicine
- Non-use values:
  - Bequest value (benefit of an individual who knows that others may benefit from it in future)
  - Passive use value (sympathy for natural environment, enjoyment of the mere existence of a particular species)

== Impacts ==
=== Natural causes ===
Habitat loss and destruction can occur both naturally and through anthropogenic causes. Events leading to natural habitat loss include climate change, catastrophic events such as volcanic explosions and through the interactions of invasive and non-invasive species. Natural climate change, events have previously been the cause of many widespread and large scale losses in habitat. For example, some of the mass extinction events generally referred to as the "Big Five" have coincided with large scale such as the Earth entering an ice age, or alternate warming events. Other events in the big five also have their roots in natural causes, such as volcanic explosions and meteor collisions.

The Chicxulub impact is one such example, which has previously caused widespread losses in habitat as the Earth either received less sunlight or grew colder, causing certain fauna and flora to flourish whilst others perished. Previously known warm areas in the tropics, the most sensitive habitats on Earth, grew colder, and areas such as Australia developed radically different flora and fauna to those seen today. The big five mass extinction events have also been linked to sea level changes, indicating that large scale marine species loss was strongly influenced by loss in marine habitats, particularly shelf habitats. Methane-driven oceanic eruptions have also been shown to have caused smaller mass extinction events.

=== Human impacts ===
Humans have been the cause of many species' extinction. Due to humans' changing and modifying their environment, the habitat of other species often become altered or destroyed as a result of human actions. The altering of habitats will cause habitat fragmentation, reducing the species' habitat and decreasing their dispersal range. This increases species isolation which then causes their population to decline. Even before the modern industrial era, humans were having widespread, and major effects on the environment. A good example of this is found in Aboriginal Australians and Australian megafauna. Aboriginal hunting practices, which included burning large sections of forest at a time, eventually altered and changed Australia's vegetation so much that many herbivorous megafauna species were left with no habitat and were driven into extinction. Once herbivorous megafauna species became extinct, carnivorous megafauna species soon followed.

In the recent past, humans have been responsible for causing more extinctions within a given period of time than ever before. Deforestation, pollution, anthropogenic climate change and human settlements have all been driving forces in altering or destroying habitats. The destruction of ecosystems such as rainforests has resulted in countless habitats being destroyed. These biodiversity hotspots are home to millions of habitat specialists, which do not exist beyond a tiny area. Once their habitat is destroyed, they cease to exist. This destruction has a follow-on effect, as species which coexist or depend upon the existence of other species also become extinct, eventually resulting in the collapse of an entire ecosystem. These time-delayed extinctions are referred to as the extinction debt, which is the result of destroying and fragmenting habitats.

As a result of anthropogenic modification of the environment, the extinction rate has climbed to the point where the Earth is now within a sixth mass extinction event, as commonly agreed by biologists. This has been particularly evident, for example, in the rapid decline in the number of amphibian species worldwide.

== Approaches and methods of habitat conservation ==
Adaptive management addresses the challenge of scientific uncertainty in habitat conservation plans by systematically gathering and applying reliable information to enhance conservation strategies over time. This approach allows for adjustments in management practices based on new insights, making conservation efforts more effective. Determining the size, type and location of habitat to conserve is a complex area of conservation biology. Although difficult to measure and predict, the conservation value of a habitat is often a reflection of the quality (e.g. species abundance and diversity), endangerment of encompassing ecosystems, and spatial distribution of that habitat.

== Habitat Restoration ==
Habitat restoration is a subset of habitat conservation and its goals include improving the habitat and resources ranging from one species to several species The Society for Ecological Restoration's International Science and Policy Working Group define restoration as "the process of assisting the recovery of an ecosystem that has been degraded, damaged, or destroyed." The scale of habitat restoration efforts can range from small to large areas of land depending on the goal of the project. Elements of habitat restoration include developing a plan and embedding goals within that plan, and monitoring and evaluating species. Considerations such as the species type, environment, and context are aspects of planning a habitat restoration project.

Efforts to restore habitats that have been altered by anthropogenic activities has become a global endeavor, and is used to counteract the effects of habitat destruction by humans. Miller and Hobbs state three constraints on restoration: "ecological, economic, and social" constraints. Habitat restoration projects include Marine Debris Mitigation for Navassa Island National Wildlife Refuge in Haiti and Lemon Bay Preserve Habitat Restoration in Florida.

== Identifying priority habitats for conservation ==
Habitat conservation is vital for protecting species and ecological processes. It is important to conserve and protect the space/ area in which that species occupies. Therefore, areas classified as 'biodiversity hotspots', or those in which a flagship, umbrella, or endangered species inhabits are often the habitats that are given precedence over others. Species that possess an elevated risk of extinction are given the highest priority and as a result of conserving their habitat, other species in that community are protected thus serving as an element of gap analysis. In the United States of America, a Habitat Conservation Plan (HCP) is often developed to conserve the environment in which a specific species inhabits. Under the U.S. Endangered Species Act (ESA) the habitat that requires protection in an HCP is referred to as the 'critical habitat'. Multiple-species HCPs are becoming more favourable than single-species HCPs as they can potentially protect an array of species before they warrant listing under the ESA, as well as being able to conserve broad ecosystem components and processes. As of January 2007, 484 HCPs were permitted across the United States, 40 of which covered 10 or more species. The San Diego Multiple Species Conservation Plan (MSCP) encompasses 85 species in a total area of 26,000-km2. Its aim is to protect the habitats of multiple species and overall biodiversity by minimizing development in sensitive areas.

HCPs require clearly defined goals and objectives, efficient monitoring programs, as well as successful communication and collaboration with stakeholders and land owners in the area. Reserve design is also important and requires a high level of planning and management in order to achieve the goals of the HCP. Successful reserve design often takes the form of a hierarchical system with the most valued habitats requiring high protection being surrounded by buffer habitats that have a lower protection status. Like HCPs, hierarchical reserve design is a method most often used to protect a single species, and as a result habitat corridors are maintained, edge effects are reduced and a broader suite of species are protected.

== How much habitat is needed ==
A range of methods and models currently exist that can be used to determine how much habitat is to be conserved in order to sustain a viable population, including Resource Selection Function and Step Selection models. Modelling tools often rely on the spatial scale of the area as an indicator of conservation value. There has been an increase in emphasis on conserving few large areas of habitat as opposed to many small areas. This idea is often referred to as the "single large or several small", SLOSS debate, and is a highly controversial area among conservation biologists and ecologists. The reasons behind the argument that "larger is better" include the reduction in the negative impacts of patch edge effects, the general idea that species richness increases with habitat area and the ability of larger habitats to support greater populations with lower extinction probabilities. Noss & Cooperrider support the "larger is better" claim and developed a model that implies areas of habitat less than 1000ha are "tiny" and of low conservation value.

However, Shwartz suggests that although "larger is better", this does not imply that "small is bad". Shwartz argues that human induced habitat loss leaves no alternative to conserving small areas. Furthermore, he suggests many endangered species which are of high conservation value, may only be restricted to small isolated patches of habitat, and thus would be overlooked if larger areas were given a higher priority. The shift to conserving larger areas is somewhat justified in society by placing more value on larger vertebrate species, which naturally have larger habitat requirements.

== Examples of current conservation organizations ==
=== The Nature Conservancy ===
Since its formation in 1951 The Nature Conservancy has slowly developed into one of the world's largest conservation organizations. Currently operating in over 30 countries, across five continents worldwide, The Nature Conservancy aims to protect nature and its assets for future generations. The organization purchases land or accepts land donations with the intention of conserving its natural resources. In 1955 The Nature Conservancy purchased its first 60-acre plot near the New York/Connecticut border in the United States of America. Today the Conservancy has expanded to protect over 119 million acres of land, 5,000 river miles as well as participating in over 1,000 marine protection programs across the globe .

Since its beginnings The Nature Conservancy has understood the benefit in taking a scientific approach towards habitat conservation. For the last decade the organization has been using a collaborative, scientific method known as "Conservation by Design." By collecting and analyzing scientific data The Conservancy is able to holistically approach the protection of various ecosystems. This process determines the habitats that need protection, specific elements that should be conserved as well as monitoring progress so more efficient practices can be developed for the future.

The Nature Conservancy currently has a large number of diverse projects in operation. They work with countries around the world to protect forests, river systems, oceans, deserts and grasslands. In all cases the aim is to provide a sustainable environment for both the plant and animal life forms that depend on them as well as all future generations to come.

=== World Wildlife Fund (WWF) ===
The World Wildlife Fund (WWF) was first formed in after a group of passionate conservationists signed what is now referred to as the Morges Manifesto. WWF is currently operating in over 100 countries across 5 continents with a current listing of over 5 million supporters.

One of the first projects of WWF was assisting in the creation of the Charles Darwin Research Foundation which aided in the protection of diverse range of unique species existing on the Galápagos' Islands, Ecuador. It was also a WWF grant that helped with the formation of the College of African Wildlife Management in Tanzania which today focuses on teaching a wide range of protected area management skills in areas such as ecology, range management and law enforcement.

The WWF has since gone on to aid in the protection of land in Spain, creating the Coto Doñana National Park in order to conserve migratory birds and The Democratic Republic of Congo, home to the world's largest protected wetlands. The WWF also initiated a debt-for-nature concept which allows the country to put funds normally allocated to paying off national debt, into conservation programs that protect its natural landscapes. Countries currently participating include Madagascar, the first country to participate which since 1989 has generated over $US50 million towards preservation, Bolivia, Costa Rica, Ecuador, Gabon, the Philippines and Zambia.

=== Rare Conservation ===
Rare has been in operation since 1973 with current global partners in over 50 countries and offices in the United States of America, Mexico, the Philippines, China and Indonesia. Rare focuses on the human activity that threatens biodiversity and habitats such as overfishing and unsustainable agriculture. By engaging local communities and changing behaviour Rare has been able to launch campaigns to protect areas in most need of conservation.

The key aspect of Rare's methodology is their "Pride Campaigns". For example, in the Andes in South America, Rare has incentives to develop watershed protection practices. In the Southeast Asia's "coral triangle" Rare is training fishers in local communities to better manage the areas around the coral reefs in order to lessen human impact. Such programs last for three years with the aim of changing community attitudes so as to conserve fragile habitats and provide ecological protection for years to come.

=== WWF Netherlands ===
WWF Netherlands, along with ARK Nature, Wild Wonders of Europe, and Conservation Capital have started the Rewilding Europe project. This project intents to rewild several areas in Europe.

== See also ==
- Biodiversity
- Biotope
- Conservation biology
- Conservation ethic
- Ecology
- Ecotope
- Environment
- Environmental impact of reservoirs
- Environmental protection
- Environmentalism
- Habitat corridor
- Habitat fragmentation
- Marine conservation
- Natural capital
- Natural environment
- Natural landscape
- Natural resource
- Nature
- Recycling
- Refuge (ecology)
- Renewable resource
- Sustainability
- Sustainable agriculture
- Sustainable development
- Sustainable land management
- Trail ethics
- Water conservation
- Wildlife
- Wildlife corridor
- Wildlife crossing
- International Union for Conservation of Nature
