= C. Hart Merriam Award =

Annual award in biology

The C. Hart Merriam Award is given annually by the American Society of Mammalogists for "outstanding research in mammalogy".

The Merriam Award was established in 1974. Before 1996 the award was given for "outstanding contributions to mammalogy through research, teaching, and service". The award is named in honor of C. Hart Merriam (1855–1942). He was not only a founding member of the American Society of Mammalogists and a physician with an M.D. from Columbia University, but also "naturalist, ethnologist, explorer, scholar, lecturer, author, personal friend of Presidents ..."

List of recipients with their institutions
Year	Recipient	Institution
1976	James N. Layne	Archbold Biological Station, University of Florida, and Cornell University
1977	J. Knox Jones, Jr.	Texas Tech University and University of Kansas
1978	James S. Findley	University of New Mexico
1979	Terry A. Vaughan	Northern Arizona University and Colorado State University
1980	Robert J. Baker	Texas Tech University
1981	John F. Eisenberg	University of Florida, National Zoological Park, University of Maryland, and University of British Columbia
1983	James L. Patton	Museum of Vertebrate Zoology, University of California, Berkeley
1985	Michael H. Smith	Savannah River Ecology Laboratory and University of Georgia
1986	William Z. Lidicker, Jr.	Museum of Vertebrate Zoology, University of California, Berkeley
1987	Hugh H. Genoways	University of Nebraska State Museum, Carnegie Museum of Natural History, and Texas Tech University
1988	Jerry R. Choate	Sternberg Museum of Natural History, Fort Hays State University
1989	James H. Brown	University of New Mexico, University Arizona, University of Utah, and UCLA
1991	Timothy H. Clutton-Brock	Cambridge University, Cambridge, England
1992	Guy G. Musser	Department of Mammalogy, American Museum of Natural History
1993	Charles J. Krebs	University of British Columbia
1994	Gail R. Michener	University of Lethbridge
1995	M. Brock Fenton	York University
1996	Katherine Ralls	National Zoological Park
1997	Kenneth B. Armitage	University of Kansas
1998	Thomas H. Kunz	Boston University
1999	Carleton J. Phillips	Texas Tech University, Illinois State University, and Hofstra University
2000	Michael A. Mares	Sam Noble Oklahoma Museum of Natural History, University of Oklahoma, and University of Pittsburgh
2001	Theodore H. Fleming	University of Miami
2002	George O. Batzli	University of Illinois
2003	R. Terry Bowyer	University of Alaska, Fairbanks
2004	O. James Reichman	National Center for Ecological Analysis and Synthesis, University of California, Santa Barbara
2005	Kay E. Holekamp	Michigan State University
2006	David Macdonald	Oxford University
2007	Robert S. Hoffmann	National Museum of Natural History, Smithsonian Institution and University of Kansas
2008	Christopher Dickman	University of Sydney
2009	Richard Ostfeld	Cary Institute of Ecosystem Studies
2010	Gerardo Ceballos	Universidad Nacional Autonoma de México
2012	James Estes	University of California, Santa Cruz and USGS
2013	Rudy Boonstra	University of Toronto
2014	Denise Dearing	University of Utah
2015	Bruce D. Patterson	The Field Museum of Natural History
2016	Joel S. Brown	University of Illinois at Chicago
2017	Mark S. Boyce	University of Alberta
2018	Stan Boutin	University of Alberta
2019	Hopi E. Hoekstra	Harvard University
2020	Jean-Michel Gaillard	University of Lyon
2021	Michael R. Willig	University of Connecticut
2022	Felisa Smith	University of New Mexico
2023	Larry Heaney	Field Museum of Natural History
2024	Felicia Keesing	Bard College
