= Paul Schultz Martin =

American paleontologist

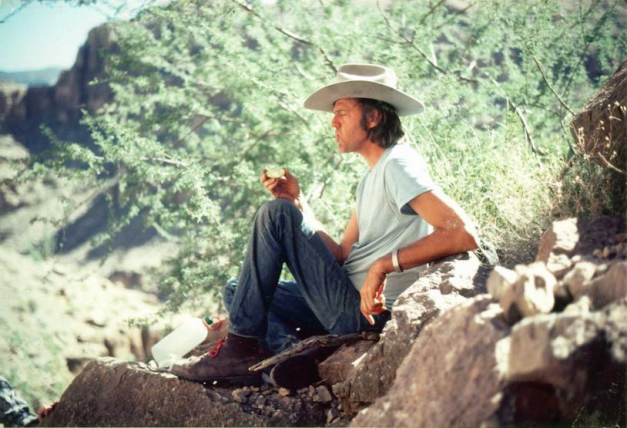
Paul Martin at Rampart Cave, home of the Shasta ground sloth in Grand Canyon, ca. 1975

Paul Schultz Martin (August 22, 1928–September 13, 2010) was an American geoscientist at the University of Arizona who developed the theory that the Pleistocene extinction of large mammals worldwide was caused by overhunting by humans. Martin's work bridged the fields of ecology, anthropology, geosciences, and paleontology.

== Career overview ==
Martin was born in Allentown, Pennsylvania. In 1953, he received his bachelor's degree in zoology from Cornell University. In 1953 and 1956 he completed his master's and doctorate programs at the University of Michigan and then proceeded with postdoctoral research at Yale University and the University of Montreal. Martin's early interest embraced ornithology and herpetology and he conducted extensive fieldwork from 1948 to 1953 in Tamaulipas, Mexico. He published biogeographies on the birds of the Sierra de Tamaulipas and the herpetofauna of the Gómez Farias (= El Cielo) region of Tamaulipas, the latter considered "a classic treatise in historical biogeography". A case of polio, contracted while doing undergraduate field work in Mexico, forced Martin to rely on a cane, which restricted but did not end his field work. He joined the faculty of the University of Arizona in 1957, maintaining his office (and his ongoing collaborations and regional fieldwork) at the university's Desert Laboratory when he became emeritus professor in 1989. He died in Tucson, Arizona in 2010 at age 82.

== Overkill hypothesis ==
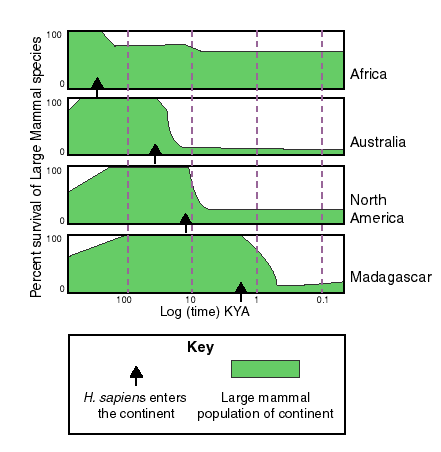
Martin's depiction of asynchronous megafaunal extinctions as evidence of newly arriving weaponized humans as the primary cause.

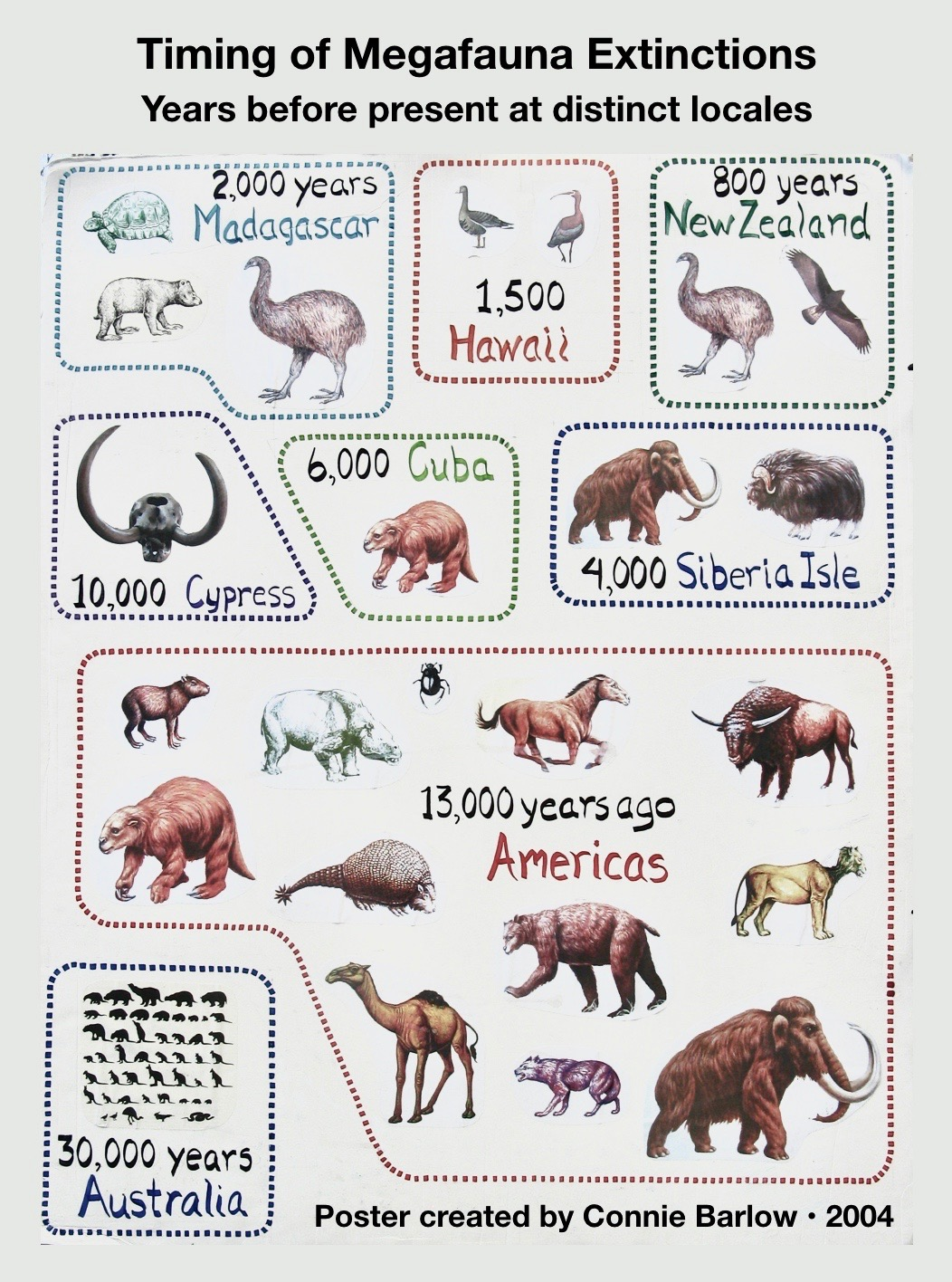
Paul Martin's "overkill hypothesis" prevails over the climate hypothesis when the timing of megafaunal extinctions in different locales is considered — especially when paired with time of first arrival by humans.

The overkill hypothesis was proposed in 1966 by Martin in a paper published in the journal Nature. Martin wrote, "The chronology of the extinction — first in Africa, second in America, finally in Madagascar — and the intensity of the extinction — moderate in Africa, heavier in America, and extremely heavy in Madagascar ... seems clearly related to the spread of human beings, to their cultural development, and to the vulnerabilities of the faunas they encountered."

Martin theorized that between 13,000 and 11,000 years ago newly arriving humans hunted to extinction North America's Ice Age large mammals, including ground sloths, camels, mammoths and mastodons. The theory, summarized by Martin for a scientific audience in 1973 and in his 2005 book, Twilight of the Mammoths: Ice Age Extinctions and the Rewilding of America, has been controversial and thus widely examined (both criticized and supported) in academic papers. From the outset, Martin pointed to the asynchronous timing of megafaunal extinctions in different locales — especially when paired with time of first arrival of humans. (See the two images at right.) Five years before his death, Martin was still collaborating with colleagues on the timing data. He joined with David W. Steadman and six additional authors in a 2005 paper titled "Asynchronous Extinction of Late Quaternary Sloths on Continents and Islands."

Early critics of the overkill hypothesis were researchers in the field of archaeology (Louis Leakey and Donald Grayson) and the geosciences (Russell Graham). The former focused on disagreements about human capabilities and expansions out of Africa. In geosciences, the focus was on the scale, speed, ecological effects, and biodiversity consequences of climate change during the Pleistocene glacial and interglacial periods. Prior to Martin's overkill idea, the mainstream scientific understanding of the causes of Late Pleistocene extinctions versus the ongoing human-caused Holocene extinction was climate change.

Martin later developed an ancillary hypothesis focusing on the speed of human entry into and saturation of a frontier landscape. This, he called the "blitzkrieg model", which, similar to the ideas of Russian climatologist Mikhail I. Budyko, relates the sudden demise of large mammal populations on different continents and at different times to the arrival of humans. Martin proposed that as humans migrated from Africa and Eurasia to Australia, the Americas, and the islands of the Pacific, the new arrivals rapidly hunted to extinction the large animals endemic to each continent and thus also naive in the presence of unfamiliar primates equipped with lethal projectiles. Martin particularly focused his research on North America, whose late Ice Age fauna rivaled that of Africa today.

For the first several decades of scientific debate about the overkill hypothesis, Martin faced substantial criticism from archaeologists and paleontologists who claimed earlier dates for human arrival in the Americas or later dates for certain extinct animals than the overkill theory would suggest. Martin maintained that such claims were the result of faulty scientific analysis and pointed out that no such dates had yet been independently verified. By 2015, five years after Martin died, radiocarbon dates had been compiled and refined to such an extent that a group of scientists concluded, "Our results, based on analyses of radiocarbon dates from Eastern Beringia, the contiguous United States, and South America, suggest north to south, time, and space transgressive declines in megafaunal populations as predicted by the overkill hypothesis. This finding is difficult to reconcile with other extinction hypotheses."

The overkill hypothesis is thus far less controversial today than it was when first proposed. Overall, when climate is invoked as a causal factor of megafaunal extinctions, it is no longer portrayed as the only cause. For example, in 2010 a paper that focused on the timing of megafaunal extinctions and human occupation within South America concluded, "This pattern suggests that a synergy of human impacts and rapid climate change—analogous to what is happening today—may enhance extinction probability." And in 2012 the authors of a paper published in Nature Communications concluded, "Mammoth extinction was not due to a single cause, but followed a long trajectory in concert with changes in climate, habitat, and human presence."

More than a half century after Martin's first publication on the overkill hypothesis, a new line of evidence emerged that offered strong support. Researchers focusing entirely on genetic analyses of surviving megafaunal populations — rather than paleontological evidence of extinct megafauna — concluded: "The inability of climate to predict the observed population decline of megafauna, especially during the past 75,000 years, implies that human impact became the main driver of megafauna dynamics around this date."

Another unique line of evidence strongly supporting the overkill hypothesis in North America was presented in 2024. A paper was published in Science Advances that had chemically analyzed the skull of an 18 month old child discovered in Montana and dated to 12,800 years ago. Isotopes of carbon and nitrogen attributable to both maternal milk and solid food most closely matched those that would have been found in the mammoth genus and secondarily elk or bison.

== Rewilding ==
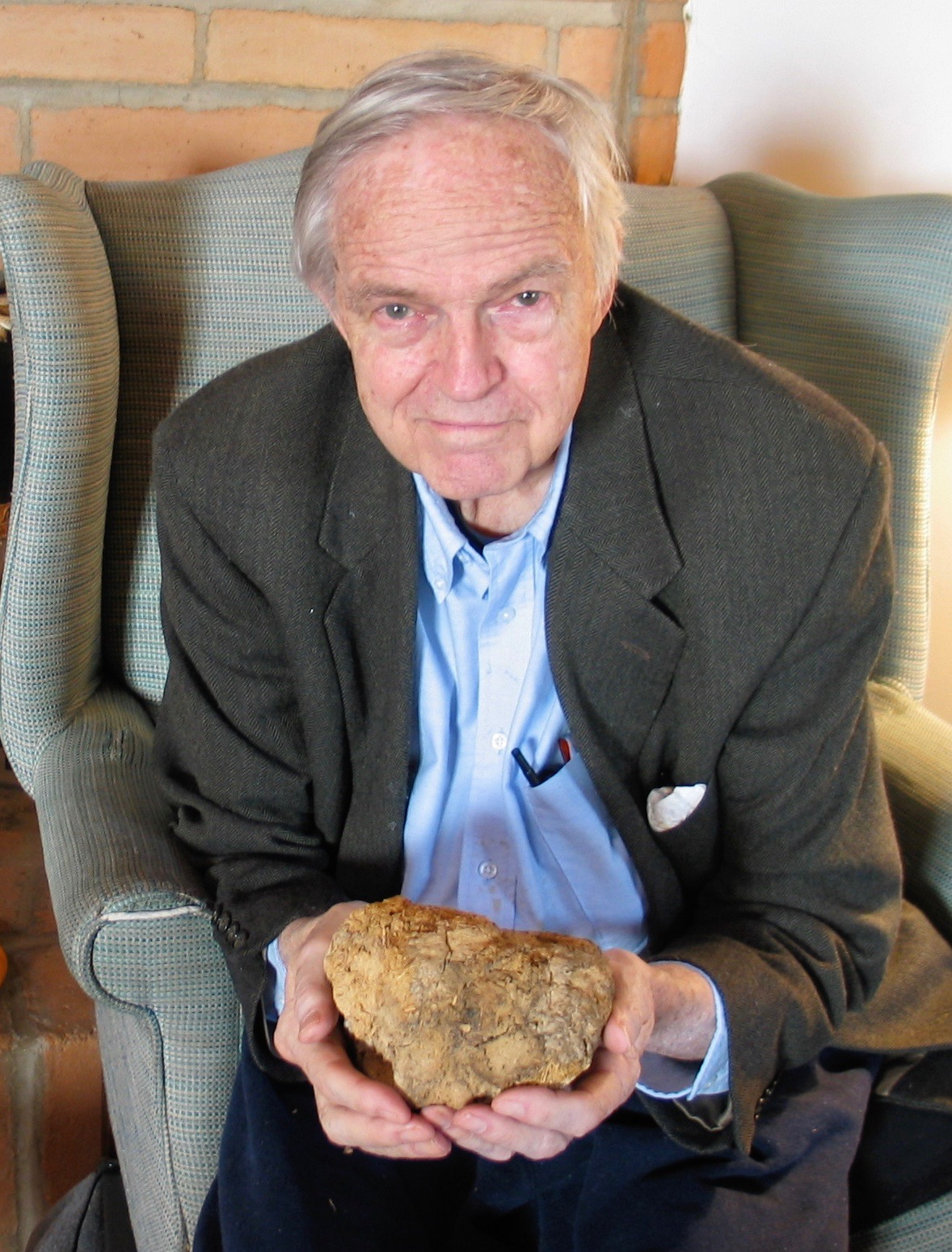
Paul Schultz Martin, 2008, holding a dungball of the extinct Shasta Ground Sloth, with whom Martin claimed to have "a totem relationship."

Martin also championed the concept of Pleistocene rewilding in which megafauna of the Pleistocene epoch that vanished in North America during the Holocene extinction could be restored by establishing breeding populations of close relatives from other continents. These could include large herbivores, such as llamas, camels, rhinoceros, and elephants, as well as lost carnivores that still reside in Africa: lions and cheetahs. To restore the megafaunal browsing function lost in North America when its mastodons and mammoths went extinct, "Bring Back the Elephants" was the title of a 1999 advocacy essay that he (with coauthor David A. Burney) published in Wild Earth magazine.

Prior to invention of the term rewilding and the beginnings of advocacy for it by conservation biologists, Martin had already proposed in 1969 and 1970 that large mammal equivalents from Africa and Asia be introduced into western North America. Their ecological function would be to restore native grasslands on which shrubs were becoming dominant — especially where cattle were grazed on semi-arid and arid landscapes in which large carnivores were rare or eliminated. In his 1969 article, Martin proposed reintroducing into North America a dry-adapted browser that had been on this continent for millions of years but vanished after humans arrived. This was the camel. To support his proposal, Martin called upon paleontological evidence that the camel family, Camelidae, actually originated in North America. He also quoted from the journal of an army officer, George Beal, who in 1857 drove a herd of domesticated camels through Texas and Arizona, destined for California. Beal reported that the camels not only would eat plants that cattle could not, but that the camels seemed to prefer thorny shrubs and "bitter herbs." In Martin's 1970 article, his abstract drew upon paleontological evidence of other native species now extinct in North America whose ancestors had evolved millions of years earlier on other continents:

"Eleven thousand years ago in North America a major biotic catastrophe resulted in the extinction of 70% of the mammalian megafauna. In the arid Southwest, domestic livestock imperfectly fill the vacated ecological niches. The experimental introduction of modern African animals can be advocated on the grounds that many of the native American mammals were themselves late Pleistocene immigrants from Asia."

In 1992 he published a broader advocacy piece, which blended scientific argument with poetic appeal. Linking the title of his essay, "The Last Entire Earth", to a phrase and sentiment expressed by Henry David Thoreau, Martin followed with:

"This, then, is our birthright, a continent whose wilderness once echoed to the thunder of many mighty beasts, a fauna that eclipsed all that remains, including the wild animals of Yellowstone and Denali. Those who ignore the giant ground sloths, native horses, and saber tooth cats in their vision of outdoor America sell the place short, it seems to me. This land is the mastodon's land. While "Home on the Range" commemorates buffalo, deer, and antelope, it misses the mammoth, glyptodonts, and camels."

== Evolutionary anachronisms and their ghosts ==
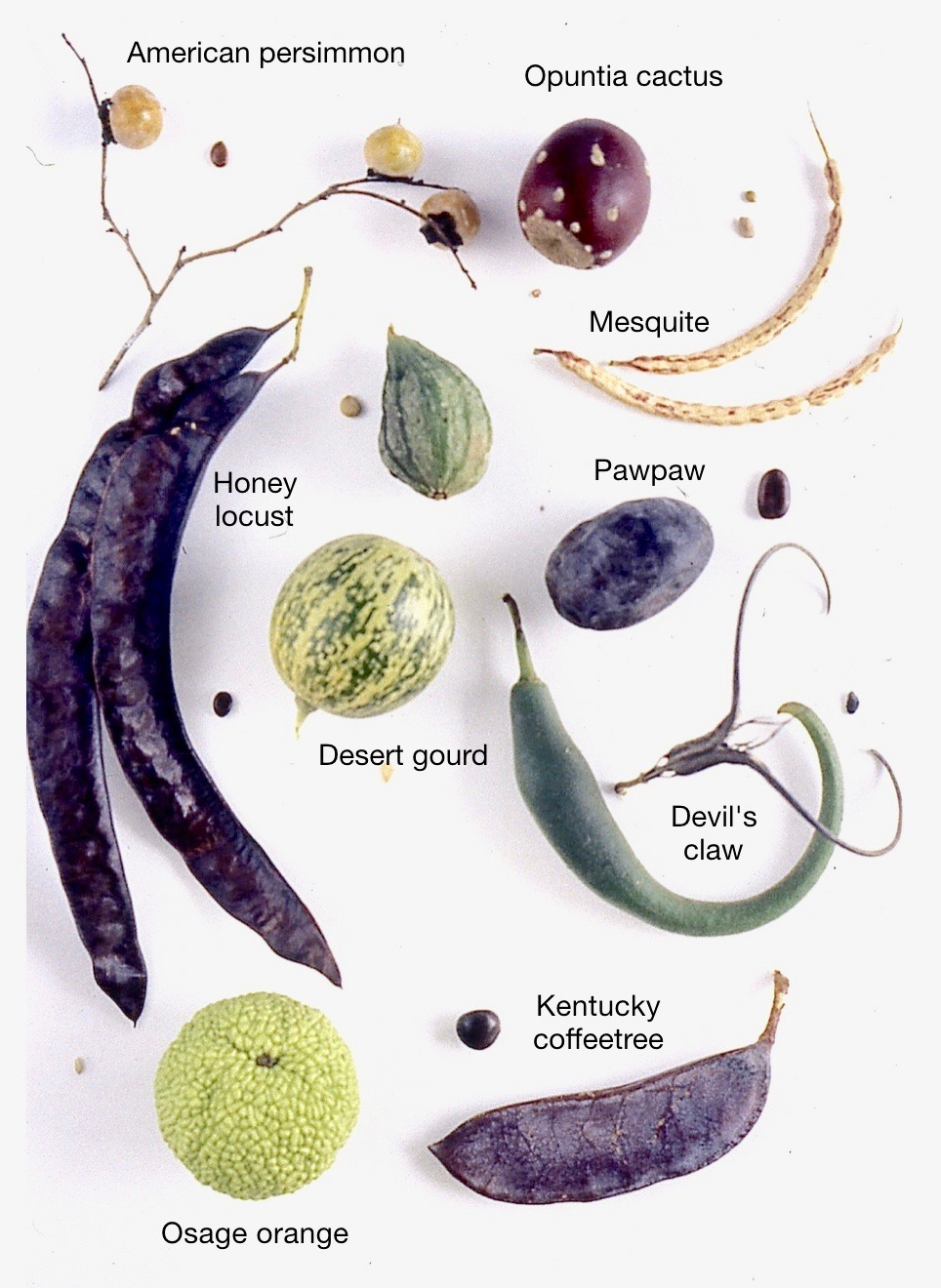
Native fruits of North America with anachronistic features.

"Without knowing it, Americans live in a land of ghosts," Paul S. Martin wrote on the first page of his final book,Twilight of the Mammoths (2005), whose subtitle linked "ice age extinctions" with a need for "rewilding of America".

Martin had long pointed out the ecological costs in North America of the recent loss of browsing megafauna in the early part of the Holocene. He attributed the ongoing incursion of shrubs into native grasslands to the absence of browsing herbivores, especially in the context of introduced grazing cattle largely protected from the continent's large carnivores who remained. It was the ecologist Daniel H. Janzen who, in the late 1970s, prompted Martin to apply his paleoecological knowledge and perspective to an additional form of ecological loss stemming from that extinction. This was the loss of animal partners that had coevolved with particular plants in dispersing seeds. Megafauna were able to swallow large fruits without spitting out or damaging the contained seeds. Hours or days later, those seeds would be deposited not only at substantial distances away from the parent plant, but also in fertile mounds of dung.

A 1982 paper published in a prominent academic journal was the outcome of Martin's collaboration with Janzen. Titled "Neotropical Anachronisms: The Fruits the Gomphotheres Ate," this paper introduced a new concept in ecology: "evolutionary anachronism", also known as "ecological anachronism". (Gomphotheres were an extinct form of elephant that lived in tropical zones of the Western Hemisphere prior to the arrival of humans.) The history of Martin's collaboration with Janzen and the impact that made in the ecological and botanical sciences were the subjects of a 2001 book by science writer Connie Barlow, titled The Ghosts of Evolution: Nonsensical Fruit, Missing Partners, and Other Ecological Anachronisms. Martin contributed the book's foreword. The species of anachronistic fruits that Barlow featured in her book included all those (and more) of temperate climate ecosystems in North America that Janzen and Martin recommended for study in the final paragraph of their "Neotropical anachronisms" paper:

"Our discussion has focused on neotropical plants and animals, but it can be generalized to the sweet-fleshed large fruits of the Kentucky coffeebean Gymnocladus dioica and honey locust Gleditsia triacanthos (Leguminaceae), osage orange Maclura (Moraceae), pawpaw Asimina triloba (Annonaceae), and persimmon Diospyros (Ebenaceae)."

== Assisted migration ==
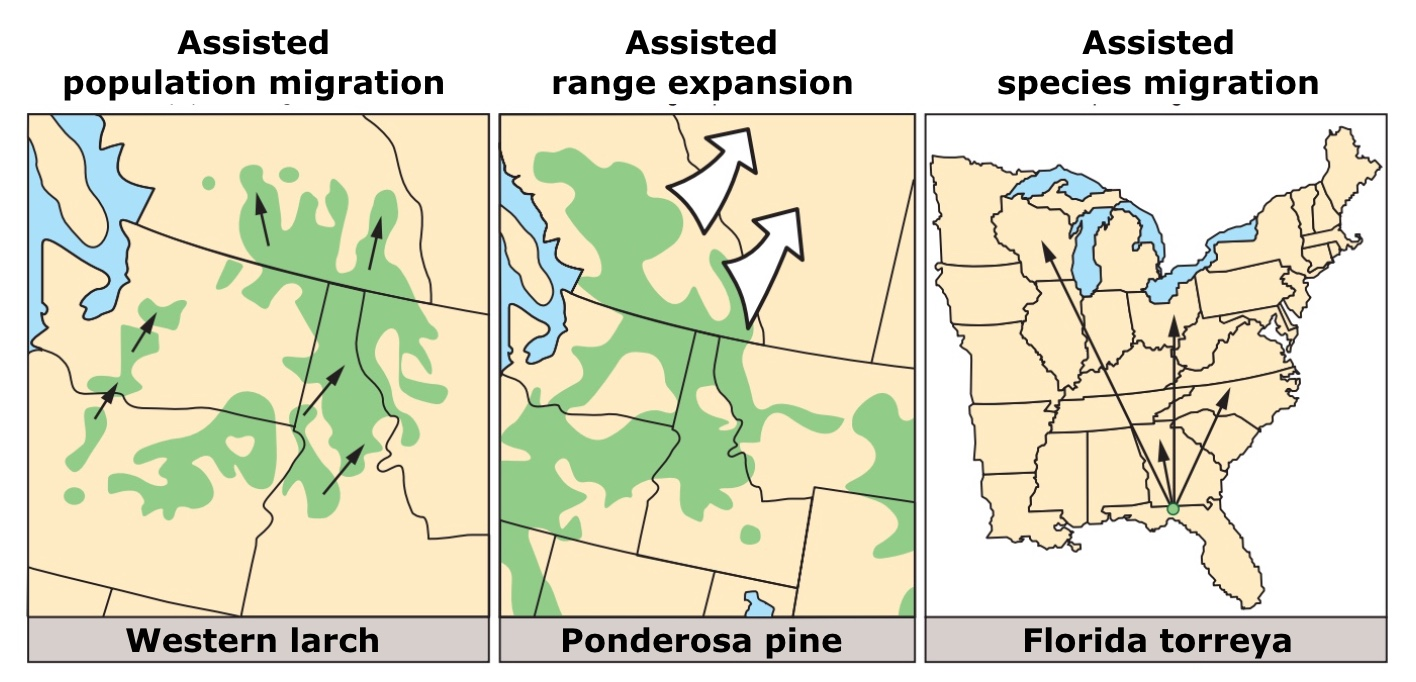
In 2014 researchers in the U.S. Forest Service suggested three types of assisted migration. Florida torreya was the tree listed for the type called assisted species migration.

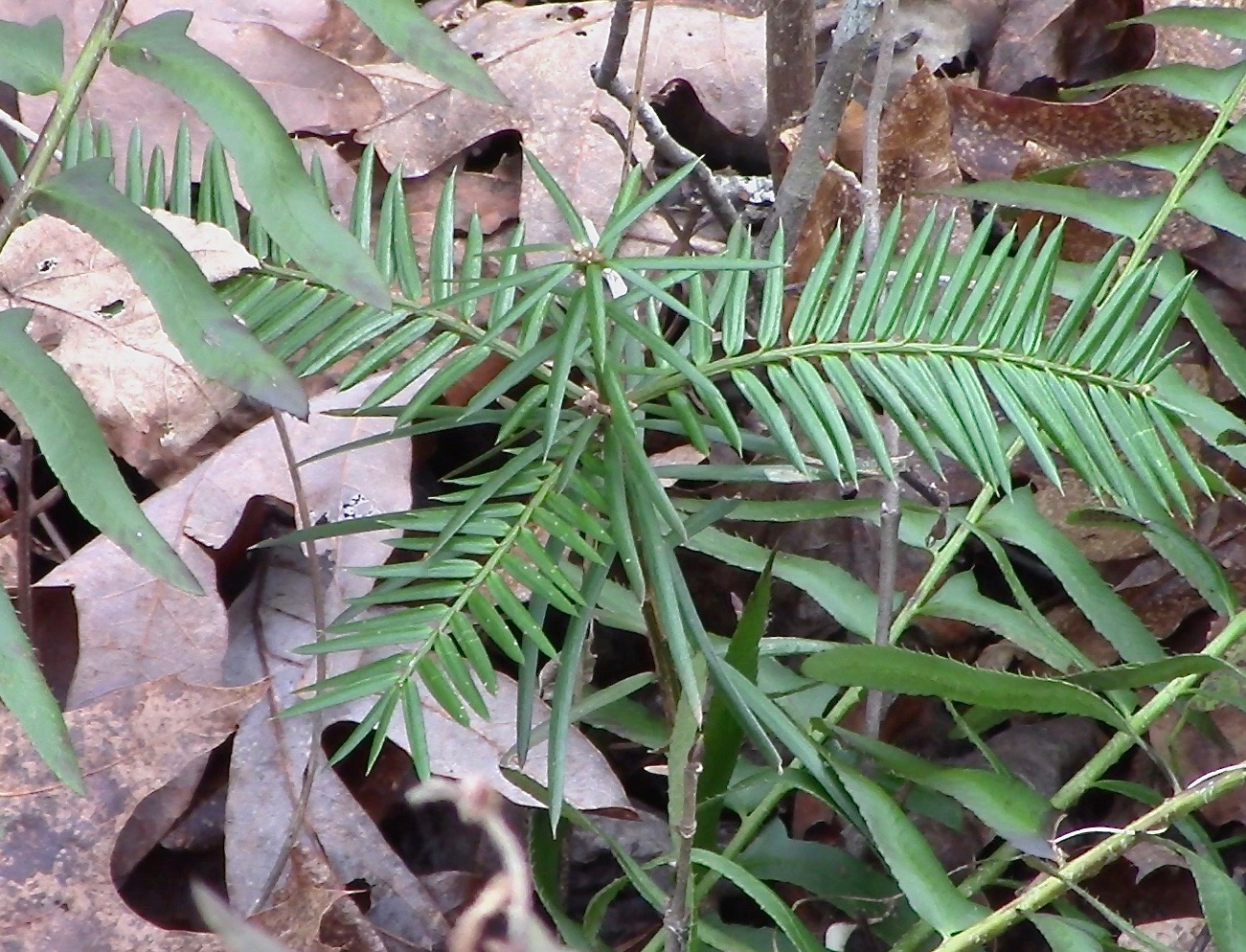
Paul Martin's advocacy in support of assisted migration of an endangered tree, Torreya taxifolia, led to citizens planting its seeds northward.

In 2004, Paul Martin played a role in launching a new controversy in conservation biology called assisted migration. Wild Earth magazine published in its forum section a pair of pro and con essays debating the topic of "Assisted Migration for an Endangered Tree". Science writer Connie Barlow joined Martin in writing the pro position: "Bring Torreya taxifolia North — Now". The oppositional case was presented by Mark W. Schwartz, professor at the University of California, Davis, who argued "Conservationists Should Not Move Torreya taxifolia".

Both sides agreed that this ancient conifer was a glacial relict, having shifted southward during the glaciations but unable to disperse its large seed northward during the Holocene. Both sides also recognized the seriousness of intentionally moving this species northward, given that additional climate warming expected in the future might amplify calls for moving many other plants, too. Whether to act now or to engage in further scientific scrutiny and consultation was where the two sides differed. Barlow and Martin's final paragraph:

"'Left behind in near time' may thus be a syndrome that applies to a number of extinct, imperiled, and soon-to-be imperiled plants, and perhaps to small, isolated populations of species that are not themselves in danger of extinction. How might this awareness alter our conservation options as climate shifts? By assisting the migration of Torreya taxifolia now, we can help to shape a better next chapter for this beleaguered tree and, perhaps, many other plants."

A citizen group organized and began to act soon after the forum essays were published in Wild Earth. These Torreya Guardians have been called a "rogue" group for not following the guidelines of the International Union for Conservation of Nature. And yet, a 2017 editorial within a leading international journal, Nature, characterized the group's actions in this way, "In one of the only real-world examples of assisted migration so far, campaigners have planted the seeds of the critically endangered conifer Torreya taxifolia hundreds of miles north of its Florida home."

== Legacy ==
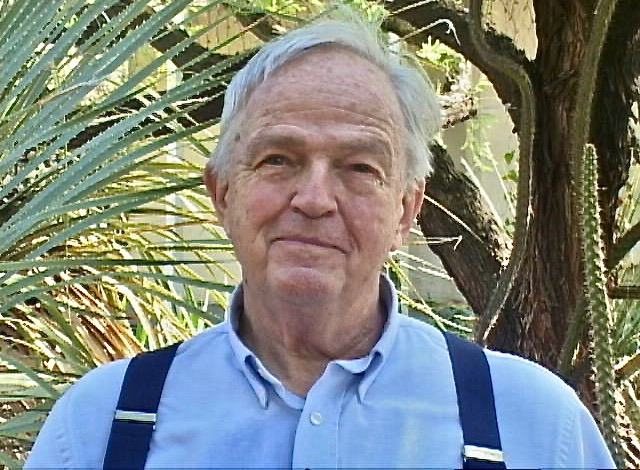
Paul S. Martin, at home in Tucson, Arizona (2004).

The University of Arizona, where Paul S. Martin served as professor (and emeritus) until his death in 2010, published an obituary that included quotations from some of his colleagues and former students at the university. Vance Haynes commented, "Unlike so many people who get infatuated with their own theories, he [Martin] spent his professional career inviting criticism. He put together two critical conferences about Pleistocene extinctions, and the volumes that came out of those were pace-setting."

David W. Steadman contributed an obituary published in the Bulletin of the Ecological Society of America. There he posted a long list of scholarly publications by his mentor, while characterizing Martin as "one of the giants of paleoecology." Steadman wrote this tribute from the perspective of both a former graduate student of Martin's and a coauthor of four papers or book chapters. Commenting on Martin's life-long practice of natural history and identifying as a naturalist as well as a scientist, Steadman wrote, "Even though he was one of the most avid readers I have ever known, Paul believed firmly in the need to see things first hand."

Two coauthors with Martin of foundational papers in North American advocacy of megafaunal rewilding chose to highlight Martin's capacity to convey science in poetic ways. In an obituary published in PloS Biology, C. Josh Donlan and Harry W. Greene selected this quotation (from Martin's 1969 essay): "Perhaps the long-lauded home where buffalo roam is also the land where camel and eland should play." The pair used a passage from Martin's 1992 essay as the epigraph for the obituary: "To behold the Grand Canyon without thoughts of its ancient condors, sloths, and goats is to be half blind." Another coauthor, Connie Barlow, selected that same sentence to feature in the eulogy that she contributed, while crediting Martin for giving her "deep-time eyes."

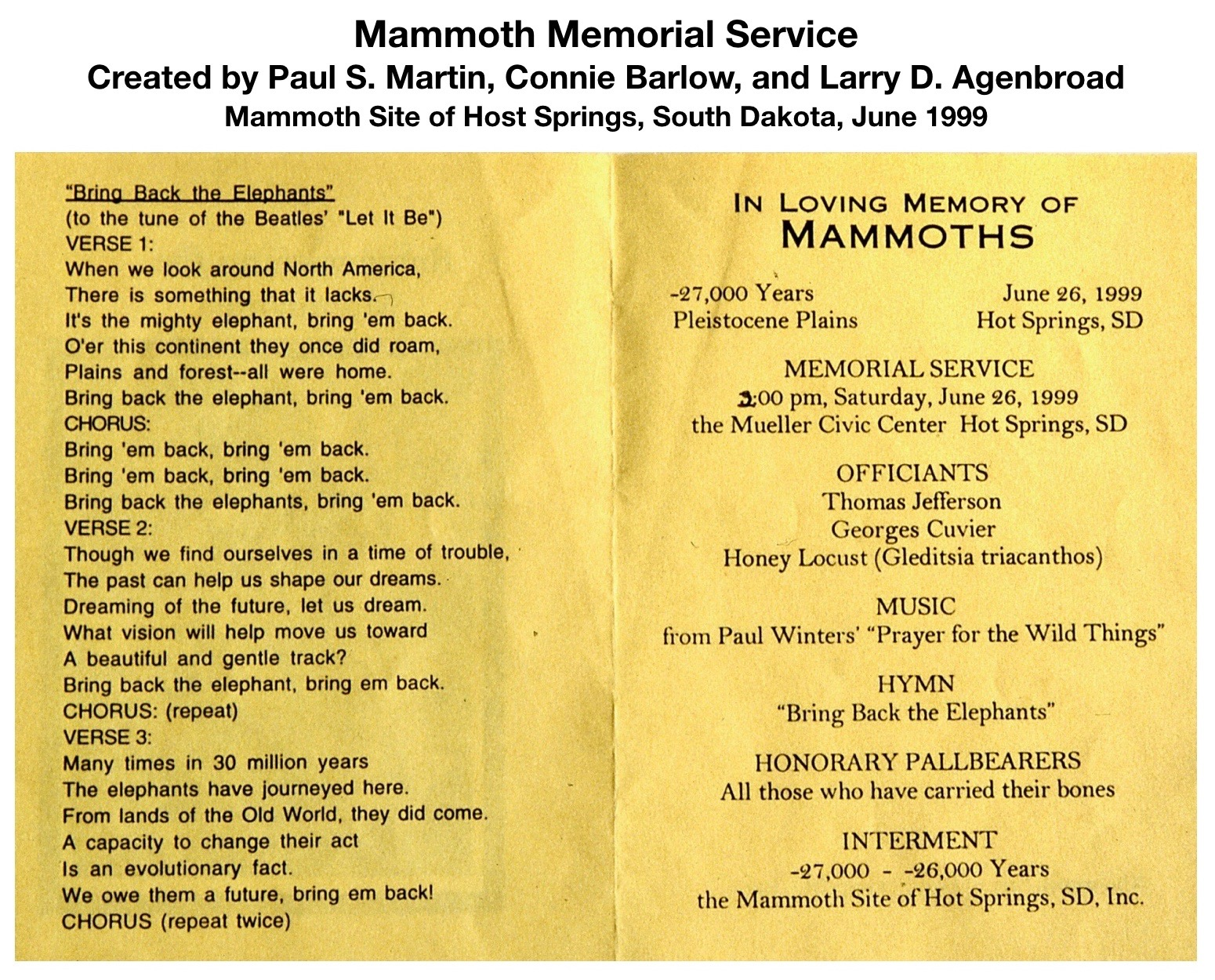
A Mammoth Memorial Service was staged at The Mammoth Site in Hot Springs, South Dakota, in June 1999.

Barlow recorded in Tucson (September 1999) an hour-long audio interview with Martin, later posted on vimeo with image overlays. There Martin speaks of the historical underpinnings of three of his legacy projects: overkill theory (begins at timecode 02:38), Pleistocene rewilding (38:42), and ecological anachronisms (55:30).

Barlow also posted a video excerpted from the 2011 outdoor memorial service for Martin, during which seven colleagues offered their remembrances. The closing hymn at the service had been composed a dozen years earlier for an unusual memorial service that Martin himself had initiated. This was the "Mammoth Memorial Service," and it was staged with collaborators (Barlow among them) in 1999 at The Mammoth Site in South Dakota. A few months earlier, Martin (with coauthor David Burney) had published an essay in Wild Earth magazine, titled "Bring Back the Elephants". And so named was the hymn. Set to a tune by the Beatles, "Let It Be," Barlow had composed the words. The image at right includes all three verses, as does Barlow's 2001 book, The Ghosts of Evolution. The final verse is this:

Many times in twenty million years
The elephants have journeyed here.
From lands of the Old World, they did come.
A capacity to change their act
is an evolutionary fact.
We owe them a future, bring 'em back!

== Selected bibliography ==
- Birds and Biogeography of the Sierra de Tamaulipas, an Isolated Pine-Oak Habitat. The Wilson Bulletin. Vol. 66, No. 1: 38–57. (1954)
- A Biogeography of Reptiles and Amphibians in the Gómez Farias Region, Tamaulipas, Mexico. Miscellaneous Publications, Museum of Zoology University of Michigan, No. 101: 1–102. (1958)
- Pleistocene Ecology and Biogeography of North America. pages 375-420: in Carl L. Hubbs (editor). Zoogeography. Publication No. 52. American Association for the Advancement of Science, Washington, D.C. x, 509 pp. (1958)
- Prehistoric Overkill. pages 75–120: in Paul S. Martin and H. E. Wright Jr. (editors), Pleistocene Extinctions: The Search for a Cause. Yale University Press. New Haven, Connecticut. 453 pp. (1967)
- The Discovery of America. Science 179: 969–974. (1973)
- Sloth Droppings. Natural History. August–September: 75–81. (1975)
- Clovisia the Beautiful. Natural History 96 (10): 10–13. (1987)
- Prehistoric Overkill: The Global Model. pages 354–403: in Paul S. Martin and Richard G. Klein (editors). Quaternary Extinctions: A Prehistoric Revolution. University of Arizona Press. Tucson, Arizona. 892 pp. (1989) ISBN 0816511004
- Overview: Reflections on Prehistoric Turbulence. pages 247–268: in Conrad A. Istock and Robert S. Hoff (editors). Storm Over a Mountain Island: Conservation Biology and the Mt. Graham Affair. University of Arizona Press. Tucson, Arizona. 291 pp. (1995) ISBN 0816515514
- Twilight of the Mammoths: Ice Age Extinctions and the Rewilding of America. University of California Press. xv, 250 pp. (2005) ISBN 0-520-23141-4
