= Katherine Ralls =

American zoologist

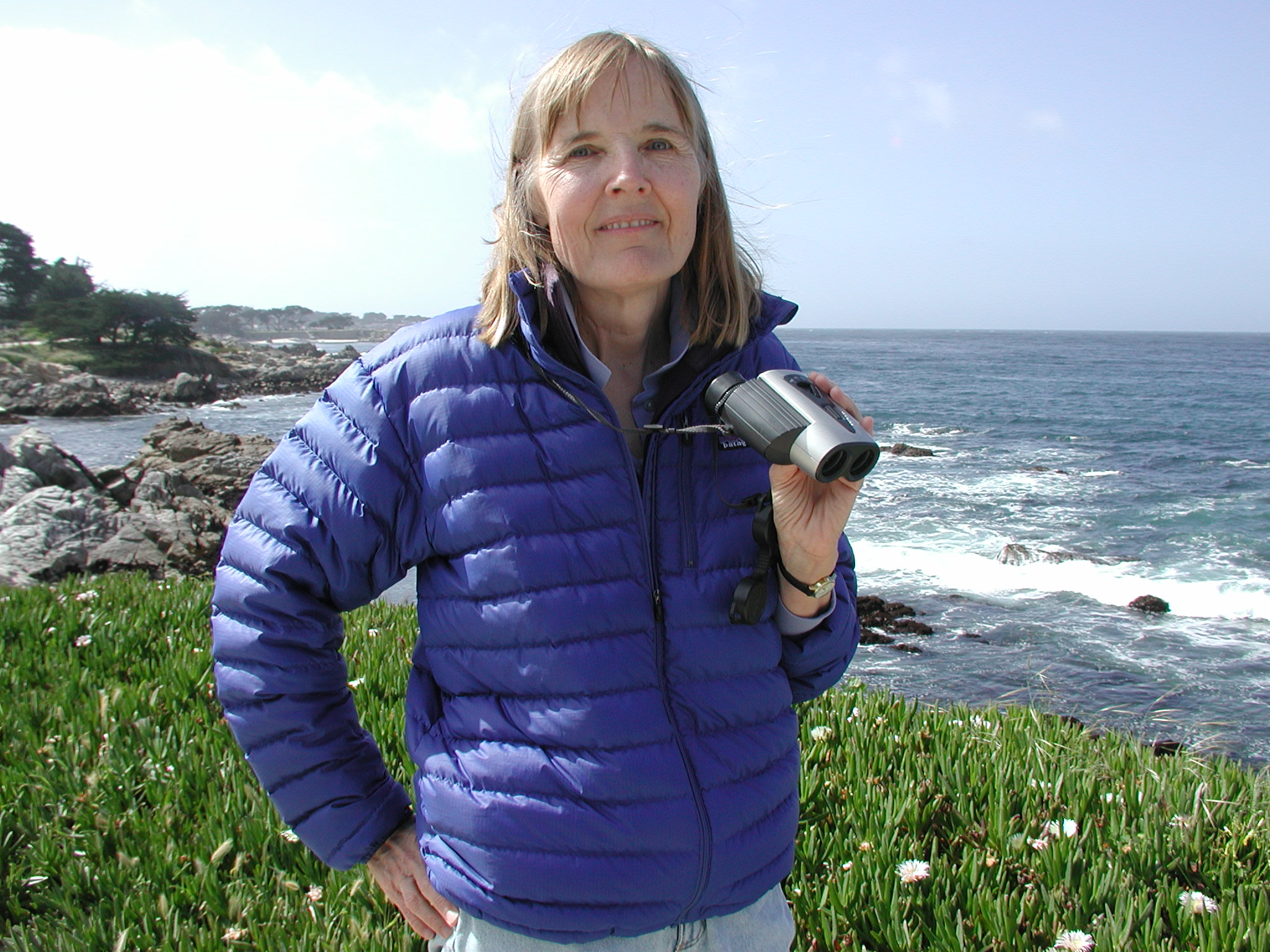
- Born: 1939 (age 86–87); Alameda, California
- Citizenship: USA
- Education: Stanford University, Radcliffe University, Harvard University
- Scientific career
- Workplaces: Smithsonian Conservation Biology Institute, University of California Santa Cruz

Katherine S. Ralls is an American zoologist and conservationist who is Senior Research Zoologist Emerita at the Smithsonian Conservation Biology Institute, National Zoological Park. Ralls' research interests are in the behavioral ecology, genetics, and conservation of mammals, both terrestrial and marine. Since 1980, she has focused on conservation biology, especially the genetic problems of small captive and wild populations.

Two mammals that she has studied extensively are the sea otter and the San Joaquin kit fox. Some of her research is on the genetic management of wild and captive animal populations.

She obtained a BA in Biology from Stanford in 1960, an MS in Biology from Radcliffe College in 1962 and a PhD in Biology from Harvard in 1965. In 2005 she was granted an honorary fellowship in the Zoological Society of London.

Ralls worked on the founding of the Society for Conservation Biology in the mid-1980s. In 1986, she and research associate Jonathan Ballou, (now research scientist emeritus at the Smithsonian Conservation Biology Institute), developed an international workshop on genetic management for zoo animals. In 2017, Ralls, Ballou, and Richard Frankham published the first book on the genetic management of fragmented species populations, "Genetic Management of Fragmented Animal and Plant Populations."

In addition to her Smithsonian appointment, Ralls is a research associate at the Institute of Marine Sciences, University of California, Santa Cruz.

== Honors ==
- Fellow, California Academy of Sciences, 2007
- Co-awarded George Miksch Sutton Award in Conservation Research, Southwestern Association of Naturalists, 2007
- Honorary Fellow, Zoological Society of London, 2006
- Resolution of Appreciation, Stanislaus Foundation Endangered Species Recovery Program, 1998
- C. Hart Merriam Award, American Society of Mammalogists, 1996
- Edward T. LaRoe Award, Society for Conservation Biology, 1996
- Fellow, Animal Behavior Society, 1992
- Fellow, American Association for the Advancement of Science, 1989
