= John F. Eisenberg =

American zoologist (1935–2003)

- Born: 1935; Everett, Washington
- Died: July 6, 2003 (aged 68); Bellingham, Washington
- Education: Washington State University, University of California, Berkeley
- Awards: C. Hart Merriam Award (1981)
- Scientific career
- Fields: Zoology
- Workplaces: National Zoo, University of Florida

John Frederick Eisenberg (1935 – July 6, 2003) was an American zoologist and professor who taught graduate courses at the University of Maryland.

== Biography ==
Eisenberg was born in 1935, in Everett, Washington. As a boy, he trapped and studied rodents, which intrigued him, so he decided to obtain a scholarship to study zoology at a university. He graduated from Washington State University and earned his master's and doctorate degrees in zoology at the University of California, Berkeley. In 1965, he took a position at the National Zoo and also taught graduate courses at the University of Maryland. He left the zoo in 1982, when he was the zoo's assistant director, to take a position teaching at the University of Florida. In 2000, he retired and moved back to Washington state. Even during his retirement, he maintained his passion for mice and other rodents, and even went to Sri Lanka to study mammals of various sizes, including elephants. He was married 3 times. He died on July 6, 2003, at the age of 68 at his home in Bellingham, Washington.
