= Felicia Keesing =

American ecologist

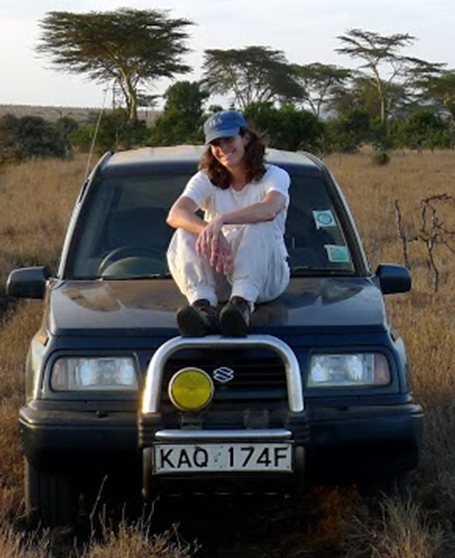
- Keesing in Kenya in 2012
- Born: January 24, 1966 (age 60); Santa Cruz, California, U.S.
- Education: Stanford University; University of California, Berkeley
- Occupation: Biologist
- Awards: Presidential Early Career Award for Scientists and Engineers; International Cosmos Prize; Guggenheim Fellowship; C. Hart Merriam Award
- Scientific career
- Workplaces: Bard College

Felicia Keesing (born January 24, 1966) is an American ecologist and the David & Rosalie Rose Distinguished Chair of the Sciences, Mathematics, and Computing at Bard College in Annandale-on-Hudson, New York.

== Education ==
Keesing received her B.S. in Symbolic Systems from Stanford University in 1987 and her Ph.D. in Integrative Biology from the University of California at Berkeley in 1997.

== Research ==
Keesing's research focuses on the consequences of human impacts, particularly biodiversity loss, for ecological communities. In Kenya, she has studied how the experimental absence of large mammals like giraffes and elephants affects savanna ecology, in particular the rodent community. She and Richard Ostfeld pioneered research on the ecology of Lyme disease, in particular how human risk for Lyme disease is affected by forest fragmentation and the loss of biodiversity. She and Ostfeld also developed core ideas about the general relationship between biodiversity loss and the emergence and transmission of infectious diseases, and a conceptual model of the effects of pulsed resources on ecological communities.

From 2016 to 2021, she and Ostfeld co-directed the Tick Project, a study to test whether environmental interventions could prevent Lyme and other tick-borne diseases in residential neighborhoods of Dutchess County, New York.

Keesing's recent research in Kenya focuses on the ecological, economic, and social consequences of managing land in Laikipia County, Kenya for livestock, wildlife, or both.

In 2009, she served on the steering committee for the Vision and Change initiative to reform the teaching of undergraduate biology, and from 2012 to 2017, with funding from the Howard Hughes Medical Institute, she directed a project on science literacy for college students. In 2017, she led the development of the curriculum for the Citizen Science program at Bard College.

Through grants offered to Keesing from the National Geographic Society, the National Science Foundation, and the National Institutes of Health, she has published over 100 different papers. Her work has also been reported on by various news sources, such as but not limited to, the New York Times, The New Yorker, NPR, and the Guardian.

== Awards and recognition ==
Keesing received a National Science Foundation CAREER Award and a Presidential Early Career Award for Scientists and Engineers in 1999. She is a fellow of the Ecological Society of America (2019) and a fellow of the American Association for the Advancement of Science (2021). In 2022, she was awarded the International Cosmos Prize. Keesing was awarded a Guggenheim Fellowship in 2023, and received the C. Hart Merriam award from the American Society of Mammalogists in 2024 in recognition of "outstanding research in mammalogy over a period of at least 10 years".

In January 2026, Keesing was elected a Fellow of the British Ecological Society.

== Selected publications ==
- Keesing, F. (2000). "Cryptic consumers and the ecology of an African savanna". BioScience. 50 (3): 205–215. doi:10.1641/0006-3568(2000)050[0205:CCATEO]2.3.CO;2. S2CID 53000884.
- Ostfeld, R.S.; Keesing, F. (2000). "Biodiversity and disease risk: the case of Lyme disease". Conservation Biology. 14 (3): 1–7. Bibcode:2000ConBi..14..722O. doi:10.1046/j.1523-1739.2000.99014.x. S2CID 3918917.
- Ostfeld, R.S.; Keesing, F. (2000). "Pulsed resources and generalist consumers". Trends in Ecology and Evolution. 15 (6): 232–237. doi:10.1016/S0169-5347(00)01862-0. PMID 10802548.
- Ostfeld, R.S.; Keesing, F. (2000). "The function of biodiversity in the ecology of vector-borne zoonotic diseases". Canadian Journal of Zoology. 78: 2061–2078. doi:10.1139/z00-172.
- Allan, B.F.; Ostfeld, R.S.; Keesing, F. (2003). "The effect of habitat fragmentation on Lyme disease risk". Conservation Biology. 17: 267–272. doi:10.1046/j.1523-1739.2003.01260.x. S2CID 34910516.
- LoGiudice, K.; Ostfeld, R.S.; Schmidt, K.; Keesing, F. (2003). "The ecology of infectious disease: Effects of host diversity and community composition on Lyme disease risk". Proceedings of the National Academy of Sciences. 100 (2): 567–571. doi:10.1073/pnas.0233733100. PMC 141036. PMID 12525705.
- Ostfeld, R.S.; Glass, G.E.; Keesing, F. (2005). "Spatial epidemiology: an emerging (or re-emerging discipline)". Trends in Ecology and Evolution. 20 (6): 328–336. doi:10.1016/j.tree.2005.03.009. PMID 16701389.
- Keesing, F.; Holt, R.D.; Ostfeld, R.S. (2006). "Effects of species diversity on disease risk". Ecology Letters. 9 (4): 485–498. Bibcode:2006EcolL...9..485K. doi:10.1111/j.1461-0248.2006.00885.x. PMID 16623733.
- Ostfeld, R.S.; Canham, C.D.; Oggenfuss, K.; Winchcombe, R.J.; Keesing, F. (2006). "Climate, deer, rodents, and acorns as determinants of variation in Lyme-disease risk". PLOS Biology. 4 (6) e145. doi:10.1371/journal.pbio.0040145. PMC 1457019. PMID 16669698.
- Ostfeld, R.S.; Keesing, F.; Eviner, V.T. (2008). Infectious Disease Ecology: Effects of Ecosystems on Disease and of Disease on Ecosystems. Princeton University Press.
- Keesing, F.; Belden, L.; Daszak, P.; Dobson, A.; Harvell, D.; Holt, R.D.; Hudson, P.; Jolles, A.; Jones, K.; Mitchell, C.; Myers, S.; Bogich, T.; Ostfeld, R. (2010). "Impacts of biodiversity on the emergence and transmission of infectious diseases". Nature. 468 (7324): 647–652. Bibcode:2010Natur.468..647K. doi:10.1038/nature09575. PMC 7094913. PMID 21124449.
- Ogada, D.; Keesing, F.; Virani, M. (2012). "Dropping dead: causes and consequences of vulture population declines worldwide". Annals of the New York Academy of Sciences. 1249 (1): 57–71. Bibcode:2012NYASA1249...57O. doi:10.1111/j.1749-6632.2011.06293.x. PMID 22175274. S2CID 23734331.
- Keesing, F.; Young, T.P. (2014). "Cascading consequences of the loss of large mammals in an African savanna". BioScience. 64 (6): 487–495. doi:10.1093/biosci/biu059.
- Ostfeld, R.S.; Levi, T.; Jolles, A.E.; Martin, L.B.; Hosseini, P.R.; Keesing, F. (2014). "Life history and demographic drivers of reservoir competence for three tick-borne zoonotic pathogens". PLOS ONE. 9 (9) e107387. Bibcode:2014PLoSO...9j7387O. doi:10.1371/journal.pone.0107387. PMC 4169396. PMID 25232722.
- Keesing, F.; Ostfeld, R.S. (2015). "Is biodiversity good for your health?". Science. 349 (6245): 235–236. Bibcode:2015Sci...349..235K. doi:10.1126/science.aac7892. PMID 26185230. S2CID 206640473.
- Ostfeld, R.S.; Levi, T.; Keesing, F.; Oggenfuss, K.; Canham, C.D. (2018). "Tick-borne disease risk in a forest food web". Ecology. 99 (7): 1562–1573. Bibcode:2018Ecol...99.1562O. doi:10.1002/ecy.2386. PMID 29738078. S2CID 13684579.
- Keesing, F.; Ostfeld, R.S.; Okanga, S.; Huckett, S.; Bayles, B.R.; Chaplin-Kramer, R.; Fredericks, L.P.; Hedlund, T.; Kowal, V.; Tallis, H.; Warui, C.M.; Wood, S.A.; Allan, B.F. (2018). "Consequences of integrating livestock and wildlife in an African savanna". Nature Sustainability. 1 (10): 566–573. Bibcode:2018NatSu...1..566K. doi:10.1038/s41893-018-0149-2. S2CID 134201534.
- Keesing, F.; Ostfeld, R.S. (2021). "Impacts of biodiversity and biodiversity loss on zoonotic diseases". Proceedings of the National Academy of Sciences. 118 (17) e2023540118. Bibcode:2021PNAS..11823540K. doi:10.1073/pnas.2023540118. PMC 8092607. PMID 33820825.
- Bahl, R.; Eikmeier, N.; Fraser, A.; Junge, M.; Keesing, F.; Nakahata, K.; Reeves, L. (2021). "Modeling COVID-19 spread in small colleges". PLOS ONE. 16 (8) e0255654. arXiv:2008.09597. Bibcode:2021PLoSO..1655654B. doi:10.1371/journal.pone.0255654. PMC 8372956. PMID 34407115.
- Keesing, F.; Ostfeld, R.S. (2021). "Dilution effects in disease ecology". Ecology Letters. 24 (11): 2490–2505. Bibcode:2021EcolL..24.2490K. doi:10.1111/ele.13875. PMC 9291114. PMID 34482609. S2CID 237423713.
- Keesing, F.; Mowry, S.; Bremer, W.; Duerr, S.; Evans Jr., A.S.; Fischhoff, I.; Hinckley, A.F.; Hook, S.A.; Keating, F.; Pendleton, J.; Pfister, A.; Teator, M.; Ostfeld, R.S. (2022). "Effects of tick-control interventions on tick abundance, human encounters with ticks, and incidence of tick-borne diseases in residential neighborhoods". Emerging Infectious Diseases. 28 (5): 957–966. doi:10.3201/eid2805.211146. PMC 9045441. PMID 35447066.
