= Richard S. Ostfeld =

American disease ecologist

- Born: September 25, 1954 (age 72)
- Education: University of California, Santa Cruz; University of California, Berkeley
- Known for: Ecology of tick-borne diseases
- Scientific career
- Fields: Ecology
- Workplaces: Cary Institute of Ecosystem Studies

Richard Simon Ostfeld (born September 25, 1954) is a Distinguished Senior Scientist at the Cary Institute of Ecosystem Studies in Millbrook, New York. He is best known for his work on the ecology of Lyme disease, which he began studying while monitoring the abundance of small mammals in the forests of Cary Institute property in the early 1990s.

== Education and employment ==
Ostfeld received his B.A. in biology at the University of California, Santa Cruz in 1979 and his PhD in zoology from the University of California, Berkeley in 1985. From 1986 to 1989, he was a postdoctoral fellow at Boston University, and he has been a scientist at the Cary Institute of Ecosystem Studies since 1990.

== Research ==
Ostfeld's research centers on the ecology of infectious diseases. His work on Lyme disease has focused on how ecological processes (e.g. the masting of oak trees, predation) affect the probability that a tick will become infected with the bacterium that causes Lyme disease. He also studies the ecology of other tick-borne diseases, including babesiosis, anaplasmosis, and Powassan viral encephalitis. From 2016 to 2021, Ostfeld co-directed the Tick Project with Felicia Keesing to test whether environmental interventions could prevent Lyme and other tick-borne diseases for people living in residential neighborhoods of Dutchess County, New York.

His work falls into three main areas, all of which center on how the basic biology of ecological systems is affected by human impacts, such as biodiversity loss and climate change. First, he studies the effects of environmental variables on tick survival, behavior, and population performance to understand how risk for Lyme and other tick-borne diseases is changing as the climate warms. He has also studied how climate change affects infectious diseases at a global scale.

His second major area of research is the relationship between land use, biodiversity loss, and infectious disease. He has investigated how forest fragmentation affects wildlife habitat, causing species diversity to decline, and how this affects the abundance of ticks infected with pathogens that cause human diseases. He has explored the generality of this phenomenon for other infectious diseases, including zoonoses.

His third major research area is the ecology of eastern forests, particularly how a web of interconnected species is affected by pulsed resources (masting by oak trees), invasive species (spongy moths), and changes to biodiversity (e.g. loss of predators). He has generalized from the patterns observed in his long-term study systems in New York to explore the impacts of pulsed resources on ecosystem dynamics around the world.

== Awards and recognition ==
In 2024, Ostfeld was elected to the National Academy of Sciences. He was elected a fellow of the American Academy of Arts and Sciences in 2019. He is a fellow of the Ecological Society of America (2014), and a fellow of the American Association for the Advancement of Science (2014). In 2009, Ostfeld received the C. Hart Merriam Award from the American Society of Mammalogists in recognition of "outstanding research in mammalogy over a period of at least 10 years".

== Bibliography ==
=== Books ===
- Ostfeld, Richard S. (2011). Lyme disease: the ecology of a complex system. New York: Oxford University Press. ISBN 978-0-19-538812-1. OCLC 502303971.
- Infectious disease ecology: the effects of ecosystems on disease and of disease on ecosystems. Richard S. Ostfeld, Felicia Keesing, Valerie T. Eviner. Princeton, N.J.: Princeton University Press. 2008. ISBN 978-1-4008-3788-5. OCLC 705945470.

=== Selected papers ===
- Harvell, C. Drew; Mitchell, Charles E.; Ward, Jessica R.; Altizer, Sonia; Dobson, Andrew P.; Ostfeld, Richard S.; Samuel, Michael D. (June 21, 2002). "Climate Warming and Disease Risks for Terrestrial and Marine Biota". Science. 296 (5576): 2158–2162. Bibcode:2002Sci...296.2158H. doi:10.1126/science.1063699. ISSN 0036-8075. PMID 12077394. S2CID 7058296.
- Keesing, Felicia; Belden, Lisa K.; Daszak, Peter; Dobson, Andrew; Harvell, C. Drew; Holt, Robert D.; Hudson, Peter; Jolles, Anna; Jones, Kate E.; Mitchell, Charles E.; Myers, Samuel S.; Bogich, Tiffany; Ostfeld, Richard S. (December 2010). "Impacts of biodiversity on the emergence and transmission of infectious diseases". Nature. 468 (7324): 647–652. Bibcode:2010Natur.468..647K. doi:10.1038/nature09575. ISSN 1476-4687. PMC 7094913. PMID 21124449.
- Keesing, F.; Holt, R. D.; Ostfeld, R. S. (April 2006). "Effects of species diversity on disease risk". Ecology Letters. 9 (4): 485–498. Bibcode:2006EcolL...9..485K. doi:10.1111/j.1461-0248.2006.00885.x. ISSN 1461-023X. PMID 16623733.
- LoGiudice, Kathleen; Ostfeld, Richard S.; Schmidt, Kenneth A.; Keesing, Felicia (January 21, 2003). "The ecology of infectious disease: Effects of host diversity and community composition on Lyme disease risk". Proceedings of the National Academy of Sciences. 100 (2): 567–571. doi:10.1073/pnas.0233733100. ISSN 0027-8424. PMC 141036. PMID 12525705.
- Altizer, Sonia; Ostfeld, Richard S.; Johnson, Pieter T. J.; Kutz, Susan; Harvell, C. Drew (August 2, 2013). "Climate Change and Infectious Diseases: From Evidence to a Predictive Framework". Science. 341 (6145): 514–519. Bibcode:2013Sci...341..514A. doi:10.1126/science.1239401. ISSN 0036-8075. PMID 23908230. S2CID 11003165.
- Ostfeld, Richard S.; Glass, Gregory E.; Keesing, Felicia (June 1, 2005). "Spatial epidemiology: an emerging (or re-emerging) discipline". Trends in Ecology & Evolution. 20 (6): 328–336. doi:10.1016/j.tree.2005.03.009. ISSN 0169-5347. PMID 16701389.
- Ostfeld, Richard S.; Jones, Clive G.; Wolff, Jerry O. (May 1996). "Of Mice and Mast". BioScience. 46 (5): 323–330. doi:10.2307/1312946. ISSN 0006-3568. JSTOR 1312946. S2CID 89496723.
