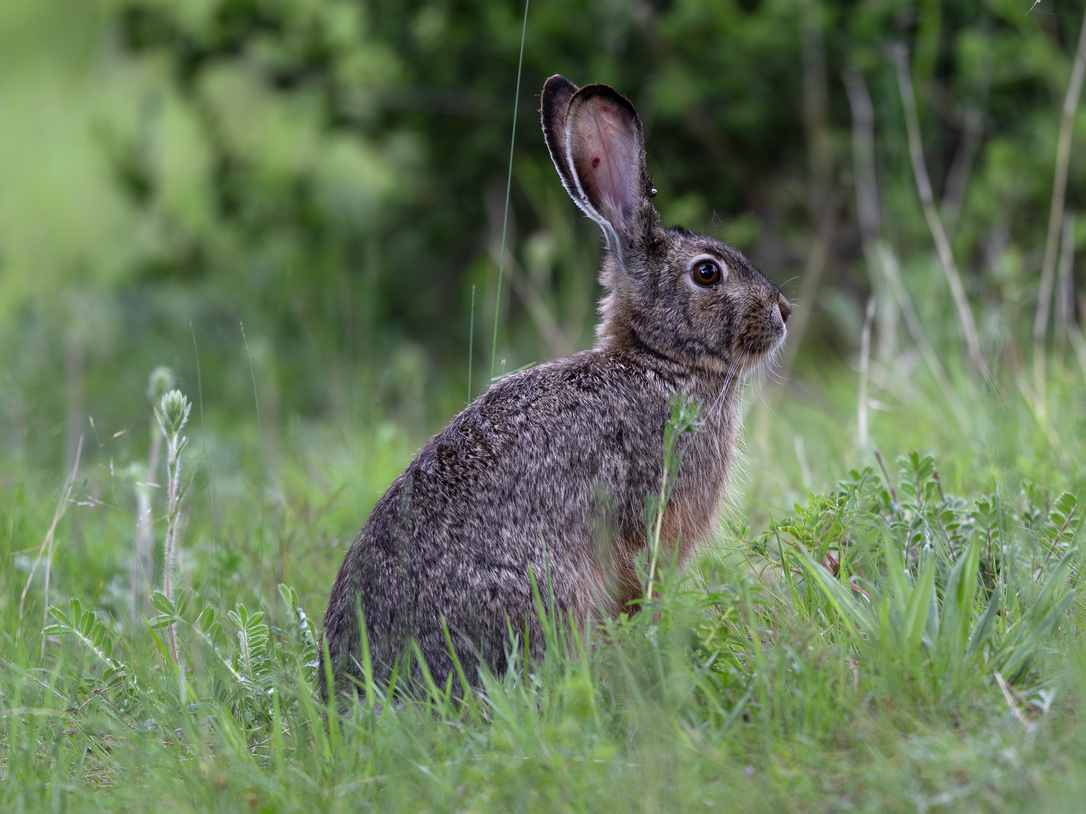
- Diqing Tibetan Autonomous Prefecture, Yunnan, China

Conservation status
- Least Concern (IUCN 3.1)

Scientific classification
- Kingdom: Animalia
- Phylum: Chordata
- Class: Mammalia
- Order: Lagomorpha
- Family: Leporidae
- Genus: Lepus
- Species: L. comus

Binomial name
- Lepus comus G. M. Allen, 1927
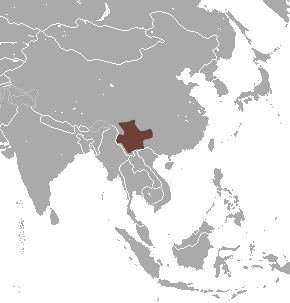
- Yunnan hare range

Synonyms
- Lepus peni Wang and Luo, 1985; Lepus pygmaeus Wang and Feng, 1985

= Yunnan hare =

Species of mammal

Yunnan hare
- Traditional Chinese: 雲南兔
- Simplified Chinese: 云南兔
Transcriptions
Standard Mandarin
- Hanyu Pinyin: Yúnnán tù

The Yunnan hare (Lepus comus) is a medium-sized species of mammal in the family Leporidae. It has soft, flat, and long dorsal pelage which is grayish brown or dark gray in color, and whitish ventral pelage. It was considered endemic to China (mainly in Yunnan), but its presence was recorded in northern Myanmar in 2000. It is a herbivore, and forages on shrubs and forbs. It is rated as a species of least concern on the IUCN Red List of Endangered Species. The Red List of China's Vertebrates has listed the Yunnan hare as near threatened, almost meeting the criteria to be listed as vulnerable.

== Taxonomy ==
The Yunnan hare was first described by the American zoologist Glover Morrill Allen in 1927. According to Hoffmann and Smith, there are no recognized subspecies, but according to A Guide to the Mammals of China, there are three recognized subspecies:

- L. c. comus Allen, 1927
- L. c. peni Wang and Luo, 1985
- L. c. pygmaeus Wang and Feng, 1985

It was formerly considered a subspecies of the woolly hare (Lepus oiostolus), but is now treated as a separate species. Cai and Feng (1982) and Wang (1985) elevated it to species status based on morphological and ecological differences from the woolly hare. In 2005, it was found that molecular phylogenetics indicated the Yunnan hare and the woolly hare to be sister taxa, and they may exhibit allopatric speciation or parapatric speciation. It might also be related to the Indian hare (Lepus nigricollis) and probably be its northern form.

== Description ==
The Yunnan hare is a medium-sized hare, measuring 32.2 to 48 cm (12.7 to 18.9 in) in length, and weighing 1.8 to 2.5 kg (4.0 to 5.5 lb). It has a 9.5 to 11 cm (3.7 to 4.3 in) long light gray tail, tinged-yellow below, which is brownish on the upper surface. The skull is thin, measuring 8.4 to 9.5 cm (3.3 to 3.7 in) in length. It has soft, flat, and long dorsal pelage which is grayish brown or dark gray in color, and whitish ventral pelage—its back of the hip and rump are grayish, and ochraceous buff extending up to the forelegs, latus, and outer side of hindlegs. The short ears measure 9.7 to 13.5 cm (3.8 to 5.3 in) in length, are pale gray at the inner surface, and black at the top. A whitish band runs from the base of the ear to the snout, including an arch over the eye. It has short nasal cavities, broad at the back side. At normal unworn state, the upper incisors are Y-shaped, and become V-shaped when worn out. The hindfeet are 9.8 to 13 cm (3.9 to 5.1 in) long.

L. c. comus is the largest subspecies. The total length of the skull is more than 8.8 centimetres (3.5 in), and the height of the cheek bone is less than 7 millimetres (0.28 in). The nose protrudes forward, and reaches up to the front of the upper incisor. L. c. pygmaeus is the smallest subspecies, with the narrowest frontal aspects and the longest latus.

The Yunnan hare is smaller than the woolly hare; the supraorbitals are flat and small, and the toothrow and diastema (space between two teeth) are of different proportions. It also has a characteristic brighter pelage than the woolly hare, although, according to Gao Yaoting, the Yunnan hare's gray rump is also a characteristic of the woolly hare.

== Distribution and habitat ==
The species is found across the western Yungui Plateau and southern Hengduan Mountains in the provinces of Yunnan (except southwest of Mekong River), southern Sichuan, and western Guizhou, in Southwest China, and has also been recorded to occur in northern Myanmar. The subspecies L. c. comus occurs in western Yunnan. L. c. peni occurs from central Yunnan, to western Guizhou (Guiyang City, Bijie, Loudian) in the east, to Muli in the north, and to southwestern Sichuan (Huidong) in the south. L. c. pygmaeus occurs from near the Yangtse River in the north, to central Yunnan.

It is a mountainous species, and prefers warm, wet habitat. Although not much is known about its habitat, it is thought to occur in high montane shrubs and meadows throughout its distribution, similar to the Tibetan habitat of the woolly hare (Lepus oiostolus). It may also occur in open forests or forest edges. It is found at medium elevations of 1,300 to 3,200 m (4,300 to 10,500 ft) above sea level.

== Behavior and ecology ==
The Yunnan hare is a diurnal species, but is also active during the night to forage. It is an herbivore, and forages on shrubs and forbs. According to reports by hunters, the adult Yunnan hare has three burrows; those of the male are shallower, smaller, and straighter than those of the female that are oval and larger in shape. Breeding usually commences in April. There are one to four, usually two, young in a litter, and in May, the female gives two or three litters.

== Status and conservation ==
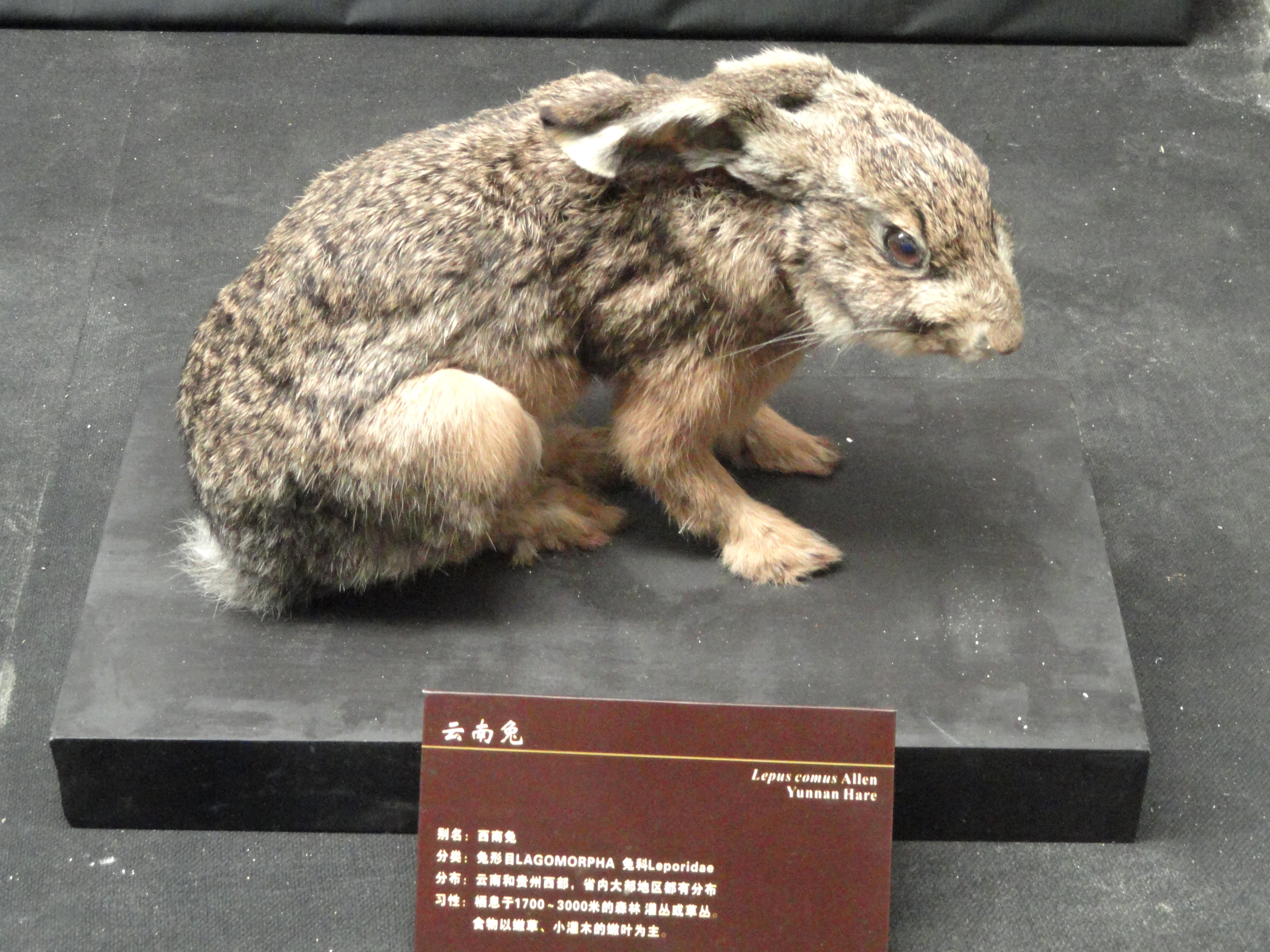
Taxidermied specimen

Since 1996, the Yunnan hare is rated as a species of least concern on the IUCN Red List of Endangered Species. This is because it is a widespread species, and it has been reported by residents to be commonly found. Although the current state of its population trend is unclear, the Yunnan hare population is likely to be secure as it occurs in remote areas in southwestern China. However, agricultural activities on mountainous regions may pose a threat to the species by isolating its mountain populations. The Red List of China's Vertebrates has listed the Yunnan hare as near threatened, nearly meeting the criteria to be listed as vulnerable. It occurs in protected areas and also in the Changshanerhai, Daweishan, Gaoligongshan, Jinpingfenshuiling, Nujiang, Shilin, and Tongbiguan Nature Reserves.
