= C. Josh Donlan =

American ecologist and conservationist

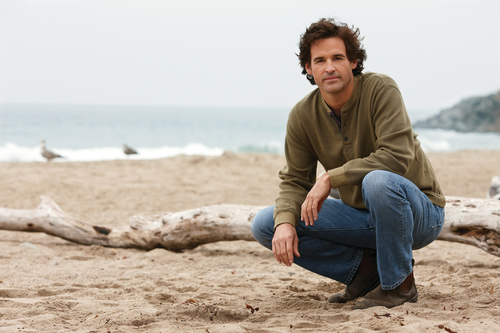
Scientist and conservation practitioner Josh Donlan

C. Josh Donlan is an American ecologist and conservation practitioner who founded and leads Advanced Conservation Strategies (ACS). The environmental conservation NGO focuses on program design, sustainability sciences, and evaluation. He has published over 100 peer-reviewed scientific and popular articles, some of them receiving widespread media attention. He is currently a Research Fellow at the Cornell Lab of Ornithology. He splits his time between the Wasatch Mountains and Andalucia.

== Career history and awards ==
- 2008–2017: Visiting Fellow, Department of Ecology & Evolutionary Biology, Cornell University
- 2012–2014: Invited Professor, University of South Paris, France
- 2011-2012: Visiting Professor, Universidad de Magallanes, Chile
- 2010: Guggenheim Fellowship
- 2008: Selected for The Best American Science and Nature Writing 2008 by Houghton Mifflin
- 2008: Conservation Fellow, The Kinship Foundation
- 2002: Fellow, Environmental Leadership Program
- 1998 Robert & Patricia Switzer Foundation Fellow

== Selected works ==
- 2019: The characterization of seafood mislabeling: A global meta analysis
- 2019: Exploring the causes of seafood fraud: A meta-analysis on mislabeling and price
- 2015: A human-centered framework for innovation in conservation incentive programs
- 2015: Proactive Strategies for Protecting Species: Pre-listing Conservation and the Endangered Species Act
- 2015: Incentivizing biodiversity conservation with artisanal fishing communities through territorial user rights and business model innovation
- 2013: Gene tweaking for conservation
- 2011: Archipelago-wide island restoration in the Galapagos Islands: Reducing costs of invasive mammal eradication programs and reinvasion risk
- 2011: Paul S. Martin (1928-2010): Luminary, natural historian, and innovator
- 2011: Biodiversity offsets: an interim solution to seabird bycatch in fisheries?
- 2010: A derivative approach to endangered species conservation
- 2009: Debt investment as a tool for value transfer in biodiversity conservation
- 2007: Restoring America's big, wild animals
- 2006: Pleistocene Rewilding: an optimistic agenda for twenty-first century conservation
- 2005: Re-wilding North America
- 2002: Golden eagles, feral pigs and island foxes: how exotic species turn native predators into prey
