= Denise Dearing =

American ecological physiologist and mammalogist

- Born: Salt Lake City, Utah

Academic background
- Education: BSc, 1985, Eastern Connecticut State University; MSc, 1988, University of Vermont; PhD, 1995, University of Utah
- Thesis: Factors Governing Diet Selection in a Herbivorous Mammal, the North American Pika, Ochotona princeps (1995)

Maria Denise Dearing is an American ecological physiologist and mammalogist. As a distinguished professor at the University of Utah, Dearing's research has focused on animals and toxic diets and diseases.

== Early life and education ==
Dearing was raised in Pennsylvania and Connecticut. She completed her Bachelor of Science degree at Eastern Connecticut State University and her Master of Science degree at the University of Vermont before moving to the University of Utah to complete her PhD with Phyllis Coley. While studying at the University of Utah, Dearing was the recipient of the 1993 Association for Women in Science award and a Fulbright scholarship to study in Australia. Following her PhD, Dearing accepted an National Science Foundation postdoctoral fellowship at the University of Wisconsin–Madison where she began studying woodrats.

== Career ==
Following her PhD and postdoctoral fellowship, Dearing joined the faculty at the University of Utah. Upon joining the faculty, she spearheaded a daycare program that the biology department sponsored for its faculty members. In October 1999, Dearing was a member of a research team that explored how atmospheric levels of carbon dioxide drive changes in the Earth's climate and impact the planet's ecology. Following this, she was part of the first research team to devise the theory that off-roading had a direct impact of hantavirus in rats. Her research team trapped rodents from rat middens in the West Tintic Mountains and found that deer mice had a 30 percent infection rate for hantavirus. Dearing replicated this study in 2009 with eight packrats captured from the Mojave Desert and the Great Basin. Her research team then scanned the rodents to look for active genes that produce liver enzymes to detoxify the poisons in creosote and the less-toxic juniper. As a result of her research, Dearing accepted a National Science Foundation grant in 2013 to study the Earth's biodiversity.

In 2014, Dearing was named chair of the Department of Biology and was recognized by the American Society of Mammalogists with its C. Hart Merriam Award for her "transformative and cross-disciplinary research on the ecological factors and physiological constraints that influence how mammals such as woodrats forage for food and evolve the ability to eat a wide range of plants, including those that contain toxic substances." While serving as chair, Dearing also received the 2018 Joseph Grinnell Award for her contributions to the integration of education and research in mammalogy. In 2021, Dearing was elected a fellow of the American Association for the Advancement of Science for her research and contributions to nutritional ecology and disease ecology. Following this, she accepted a visiting Alexander von Humboldt Foundation fellowship at the Max Planck Institute.
