= Robert S. Hoffmann =

American mammalogist (1929–2010)

- Born: March 2, 1929; Evanston, Illinois
- Died: April 6, 2010 (aged 81)
- Education: Utah State University; University of California, Berkeley
- Children: 4
- Awards: Secretary's Gold Medal for Exceptional Service; C. Hart Merriam Award
- Scientific career
- Fields: Mammalogy
- Workplaces: University of Montana; University of Kansas Natural History Museum; University of Kansas; National Museum of Natural History

Robert S. Hoffmann (1929–2010) was an American mammalogist. A researcher and professor at the University of Montana and University of Kansas and a member of the American Society of Mammalogists, he was significantly involved with advancing mammal research collaborations between the United States, Russia, and China. For his contributions to mammalogy, he received the C. Hart Merriam Award.

== Early life ==
Hoffmann was born on March 2, 1929 in Evanston, Illinois. He frequently traveled to Chicago by streetcar to volunteer at the Field Museum of Natural History and, at the age of 11, sold peanuts at the Brookfield Zoo Chicago as a summer job. He was encouraged to pursue biology from 5th grade, and studied from 1946 to 1947 at the University of Illinois Extension in Moline. After the first year, he transferred to the University of Montana, and the following year to Utah State University due to a family move, where he received his Bachelor of Science degree. He went to University of California, Berkeley afterwards, receiving a Master of Arts and Ph.D. in 1954 and 1956, respectively.

== Career ==
From 1955 to 1968, Hoffmann was a professor at the University of Montana. Then, from 1968 to 1985, he was curator of mammals at the University of Kansas Natural History Museum and professor at the University proper. During his tenure there, he was President of the American Society of Mammalogists from 1978 to 1980, an organization he joined in 1955. Following his career at the University of Kansas, he took the position of Director at the National Museum of Natural History. He kept this role until 1988, when he went on to serve various roles at the museum within the Smithsonian Institution: Assistant Secretary for Research from 1988 to 1991, Assistant Secretary for the Sciences from 1992 to 1994, and Assistant Provost for the Sciences through 1995. While he was Assistant Provost, he also served as Acting Director of the National Air and Space Museum, for which he received the Secretary's Gold Medal for Exceptional Service in 1996.

Hoffmann started translating Russian while working on his dissertation, and briefly studied at the Zoological Institute of the Russian Academy of Sciences in 1963, where he started collaborations that would eventually lead to the establishment of the International Mammal Congresses.

Hoffmann made contributions to encyclopedic works on mammalogy in the early 21st century, including the Guide to the Mammals of China and Mammal Species of the World. In 2006, for his contributions to the field of mammalogy, he was awarded the C. Hart Merriam Award.

In 1996, a subspecies of the alpine pika was named after him, Hoffmann's pika (Ochotona alpina hoffmanni). It was later described as a distinct species.

== Personal life ==
Hoffmann married his wife Sally Ann Monson in 1958 and had 4 children. He died of complications from dementia at 81.
