= Pologongka =

Mountain peak

- Location within India Location within Ladakh

Highest point
- Elevation: 6,390 m (20,960 ft)
- Prominence: 1,277 m (4,190 ft)
- Coordinates: 33°18′24″N 78°11′55″E

Geography
- Location: Ladakh

Climbing
- First ascent: August 1997 by a British-Indian team

Pologongka is a mountain peak located at 6,390 m (20,960 ft) above sea level in the Indian territory of Ladakh, far west of the Transhimalaya.

== Location ==
The peak is located in the north of Spangnak Ri and its overlooking at Leh-Nyoma highway. The prominence is 1,277 m (4,190 ft).

== Climbing history ==
In August 1997, Mike Ratty, Richard Law, Trevor Willis, and Narindar Chakula accomplished the first ascent of Pologongka.
