= Jackrabbit (disambiguation) =

A jackrabbit, or hare, is a mammal belonging to the genus Lepus, so named for the resemblance of its ears to that of a donkey or jackass.

Jack rabbit, Jackass rabbit or Jackrabbit may also refer to:

== Species ==
- Antelope jackrabbit
- Black-tailed jackrabbit
- White-sided jackrabbit
- Tehuantepec jackrabbit
- Black jackrabbit
- White-tailed jackrabbit

== Arts and entertainment ==
- Jackrabbit, a 2015 San Fermin album
- A song from the album Have One On Me by Joanna Newsom
- Jackrabbit (film), a 2015 American cyberpunk film
- Jack Rabbit (Kennywood), a roller coaster near Pittsburgh, Pennsylvania, United States
- Jack Rabbit (Seabreeze), a roller coaster in Irondequoit, New York, United States
- Jack Rabbit (Celebration City), a roller coaster in Kissimmee, Florida, United States, renamed Hurricane
- Jack Rabbit (Clementon Park), a roller coaster at Clementon Amusement Park, Clementon, New Jersey, United States
- Jack Rabbit or rabbit vibrator, a sex toy

== Computer-related items ==
- Apache Jackrabbit, a Java-based content repository
- JackRabbit Beta, now JumpUp website of Intuit
- Jazz Jackrabbit, a game series

== People ==
- Jackrabbit, nickname of Herman Smith-Johannsen (1875–1987), Norwegian skier and supercentenarian
- Janoris Jenkins (born 1998), American National Football League cornerback nicknamed "Jackrabbit"

== Places ==
- Jackrabbit, Arizona, United States, a former mining community
- Jackrabbit Ecological Reserve, Quebec, Canada

== Sports ==
- South Dakota State Jackrabbits, the athletics teams of South Dakota State University
- Kokomo Jackrabbits, a college summer baseball team based in Kokomo, Indiana
- Jackrabbits, the athletics teams of Lonoke High School, Lonoke, Arkansas
- Jackrabbits, the athletics teams of Victor Valley High School, Victorville, California, United States

== Other uses ==
- Jack Rabbit Trading Post, Joseph City, Arizona, a convenience store and curio shop

== See also ==
- "Jackrabbiting," rapid acceleration from a stopped position with a motor vehicle
- Jackalope
