= Tamaulipas jackrabbit =

Scientific classification
- Kingdom: Animalia
- Phylum: Chordata
- Class: Mammalia
- Order: Lagomorpha
- Family: Leporidae
- Genus: Lepus
- Species: L. altamirae

Binomial name
- Lepus altamirae E. W. Nelson, 1904

Synonyms
- Lepus californicus altamirae

Species of hare endemic to the Gulf Coast of Mexico

The Tamaulipas jackrabbit (Lepus altamirae), also known as the Tamaulipas white-sided jackrabbit, is a species of hare endemic to the Gulf Coast of Mexico.

== Taxonomy and evolution ==
It was formerly thought to be a subspecies of the black-tailed jackrabbit (L. californicus), but genetic analysis found it to represent a distinct species that was actually most closely related to the Tehuantepec jackrabbit (L. flavigularis), with this clade being sister to a clade containing the black-tailed and antelope (L. alleni) jackrabbits, with the white-sided jackrabbit (L. callotis) being basal to both clades. It was thus reinstated as a separate species, and these results were later followed by the American Society of Mammalogists. The distribution of L. callotis, L. flavigularis, L. alleni, and L. altamirae in fragmented tropic-subtropic habitats seems to reflect a group that once had a wider range throughout the Americas prior to the Pleistocene, with climate change and the arrival of the black-tailed jackrabbit isolating these species in tropic-subtropic habitats.

== Range, habitat, and threats ==
It has a very small range, being found from the coastal plain of southern Tamaulipas south to extreme north Veracruz and west to the eastern border of San Luis Potosí. It is an endemic of the Tamaulipan mezquital ecosystem. The first specimens of the species were found in 1898 in a scrubland consisting primarily of guava (Psidium guajava), mesquites (Prosopis juliflora), acacias, and cactuses of various species. No other specimens have been collected since, and it has been feared that the species has at least suffered a significant reduction in range similar to that faced by L. flavigularis and L. callotis, with the latter species being replaced over most of its range by L. californicus. However, a putative individual was photographed with a trail camera near the Laguna Madre in 2016, with the images being posted to Facebook and Twitter. In addition, another putative individual was photographed in Soto la Marina in 2014, with the images being posted to iNaturalist and initially identified as a black-tailed jackrabbit. These sightings indicate that L. altamirae may still be extant despite the threats it faces. In 2022, a paper reporting on photographic sightings in 2016 and 2021 confirmed the persistence of the species, and also found it to inhabit northeastern San Luis Potosi, a region where it was previously not known; the presence of the species here may be related to land use change.
