= Jack Rabbit Trading Post =

Roadside attraction on U.S. Route 66 in Arizona

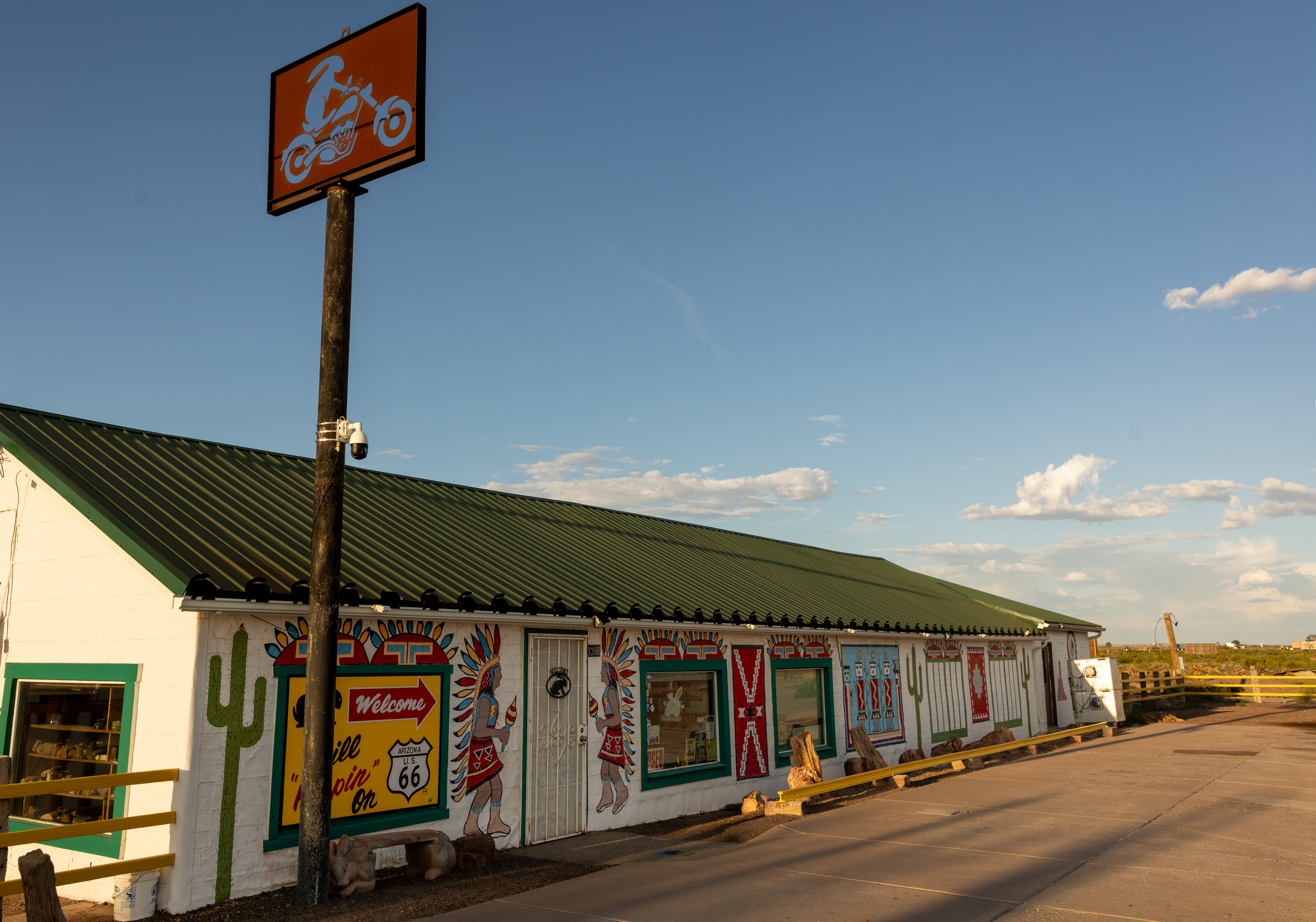
- Jack Rabbit Trading Post in 2026
- Interactive map of the Jack Rabbit Trading Post area

General information
- Type: Roadside attraction and retail store
- Location: 3386 Historic U.S. 66, Joseph City, Arizona, United States
- Coordinates: 34°58′05.82″N 110°25′49.58″W
- Opened: 1949, as the Jack Rabbit Trading Post
- Owner: Tony and Cindy Jaquez

Website
- www.jackrabbittradingpost.com

The Jack Rabbit Trading Post is a roadside trading post and souvenir shop on a former alignment of U.S. Route 66 near Joseph City, Arizona, beside the Jackrabbit Road interchange, Exit 269, on Interstate 40. James "Jim" Taylor opened the business in 1949. Yellow roadside signs once counted down the miles to the store, each carrying the silhouette of a black jackrabbit. The sequence ended beside the trading post with the large "HERE IT IS" sign. A saddled fiberglass jackrabbit also stands outside the store for photographs.

Glenn and Hattie Belle Blansett began operating the trading post in 1961 and bought it from Taylor in 1967. Their granddaughter Cindy Jaquez and her husband Tony have owned it since 1995. Pixar visited the trading post while researching the 2006 film Cars. The "HERE IT IS" sign reappeared in the fictional town of Radiator Springs, with a Ford Model T replacing the jackrabbit, and another version was later built at Cars Land in Disney California Adventure.

== History ==
The building occupied by the Jack Rabbit Trading Post is older than the business itself. It had been used by the Atchison, Topeka and Santa Fe Railway and housed the Arizona Herpetarium, a snake exhibit and gift shop, in the late 1930s. After the herpetarium closed, the Rockwell family ran a restaurant and dance hall there. James "Jim" Taylor opened the Jack Rabbit Trading Post in 1949, selling souvenirs to motorists on U.S. Route 66. He chose a jackrabbit for the store's emblem and placed a large rabbit figure outside where travelers could stop for photographs.

Taylor soon joined Wayne Troutner, owner of the For Men Only clothing store in Winslow, Arizona, in advertising their businesses along Route 66. Jack Rabbit signs were painted yellow with a black rabbit and the number of miles left to the trading post. The countdown ended beside the store with the large "HERE IT IS" sign. Jack Rabbit advertisements reached as far east as Illinois and as far west as California. The store also used the slogan "If you haven't been to the Jack Rabbit, you haven't been to the Southwest." Employees tied cardboard Jack Rabbit advertisements to the bumpers of customers' cars as they left.

Glenn and Hattie Belle Blansett leased the trading post from Taylor in 1961 and bought it in 1967. Glenn Blansett also represented Navajo County in the Arizona Senate. Interstate 40 bypassed this stretch of Route 66 in the late 1960s, leaving the trading post beside the old highway. Cindy recalled that her grandfather's position in the Senate helped secure an interchange serving the trading post when the interstate was built.

The Blansetts expanded the building in 1967. Cold cherry cider was sold at the store until the early 1980s. Longtime employee Glen Jones recalled that, while working on the east end of the building, he removed part of the old floor and found hundreds of snake skeletons underneath, left from the years when the Arizona Herpetarium occupied the property.

The Blansetts' son Philip "Phil" Blansett and his wife Patricia "Pat" Blansett took over the business in 1969. Their daughter Cindy grew up at the trading post. She and her husband Tony Jaquez bought it from her parents in 1995.

In 2018, after travelers began posting online that the trading post appeared to be closed, Cindy Jaquez began sharing regular updates on social media. That year, a photograph of a custom-made replica of one of the old yellow mileage signs circulated widely among Route 66 enthusiasts.

For the trading post's 70th anniversary in 2019, the fiberglass jackrabbit was repaired and repainted before a gathering in July. On June 13, 2026, the trading post held a car and motorcycle show during Arizona's celebration of the Route 66 centennial.

== Store and grounds ==
The Jack Rabbit remains a working gift shop. Much of its merchandise uses Route 66 or the trading post's rabbit imagery, including clothing, patches, magnets, ornaments, books, replica road signs, candy, and seasonings. The store also sells Native American crafts. Small versions of the old yellow mileage signs are still sold as souvenirs. Metal versions can be ordered with the number of miles from a chosen location to the trading post, repeating the format of Taylor's original roadside advertisements. A small room at the rear displays Route 66 memorabilia and antiques.

Old vehicles have also been kept around the property. A weathered De Soto sedan that belonged to Tony Jaquez's father was left at the trading post and became a popular subject for photographs. A 1949 Nash sedan was kept behind the store by 2000, when it was still in running condition. A first-generation Volkswagen Rabbit has also been parked outside as another play on the trading post's rabbit theme.

== Signs and jackrabbit ==
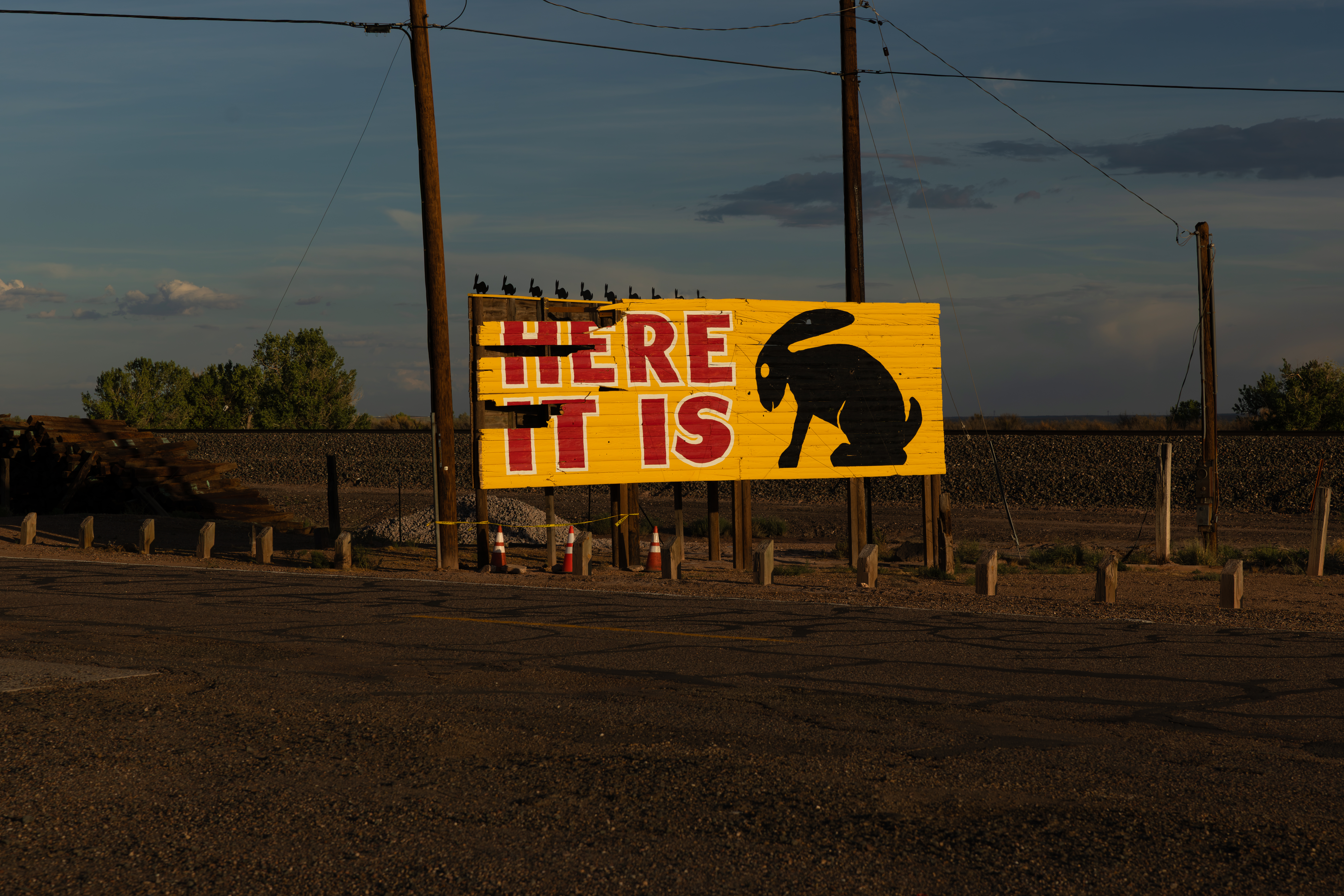
The "HERE IT IS" sign

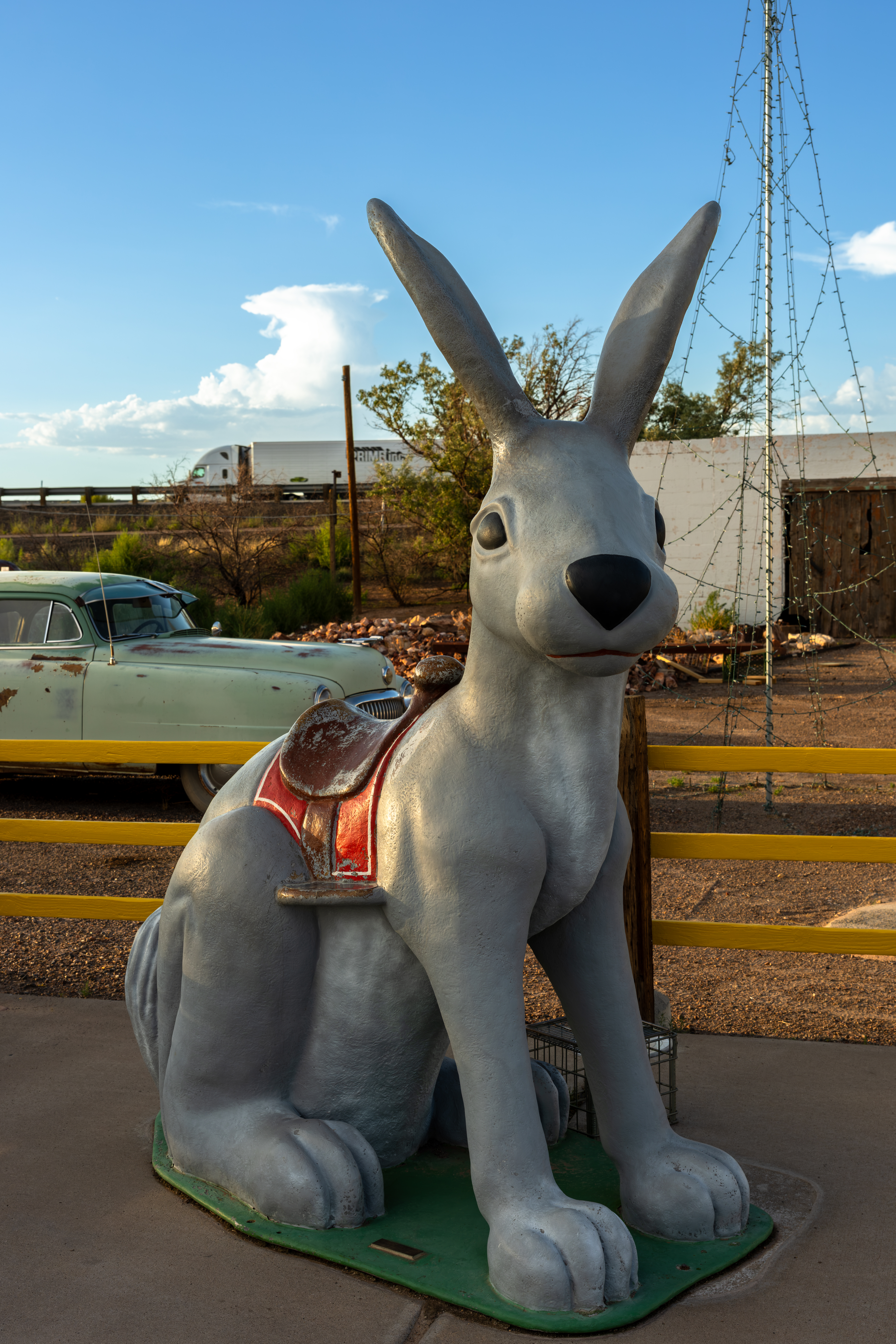
The saddled fiberglass jackrabbit

The large wooden "HERE IT IS" sign stands beside the trading post. A black jackrabbit fills the yellow panel above the words in red lettering. It was the last of the signs that once counted down the miles to the store, and its two faces were meant for traffic approaching from either direction. Most of its outer boards still dated to 1949 when the west face was restored over 27 days in 2018.

A monsoon storm on July 20, 2026, tore one side of the sign from its posts and weakened the other, breaking pieces of the original wood. Crews and volunteers re-erected and secured the fallen side within days. The trading post remained open, although further repairs to the sign were still needed later that week.

The trading post has had three large jackrabbit figures. The first was a gray, fur-covered rabbit used when the store opened in 1949. A second arrived in 1956. The present rabbit is hollow fiberglass, with a saddle that visitors can sit on for photographs. In June 2019, it was taken down while its steps and ears were repaired, then repainted and returned to its place outside the store.

== In popular culture ==
While developing the 2006 Pixar film Cars, director John Lasseter and other members of the creative team traveled Route 66 with writer and historian Michael Wallis, stopping at roadside businesses and communities as they gathered ideas for the fictional town of Radiator Springs. They visited the Jack Rabbit Trading Post during the trip. Tony and Cindy Jaquez were among the Route 66 residents and business owners thanked in the film's end credits, where the trading post is listed as the "Home of the 'Here It Is' Sign".

A version of the Jack Rabbit sign appears in Radiator Springs outside Radiator Springs Curios, the souvenir shop run by the Model T character Lizzie. The yellow billboard keeps the red "HERE IT IS" lettering but replaces the black jackrabbit with the silhouette of a Model T. Another version of the sign was built at Cars Land in Disney California Adventure, which opened in 2012 as a recreation of Radiator Springs.

The trading post was also visited in the 2026 episode "Route 66 in Arizona" of the travel series Samantha Brown's Places to Love. Brown toured the store and spoke with Cindy Jaquez during a trip across Arizona's portion of Route 66.

Photographer Carol M. Highsmith photographed the trading post and its "HERE IT IS" sign in 2006 and again in 2018 for her America Project. The photographs are held in the Library of Congress's Carol M. Highsmith Archive.

== Gallery ==
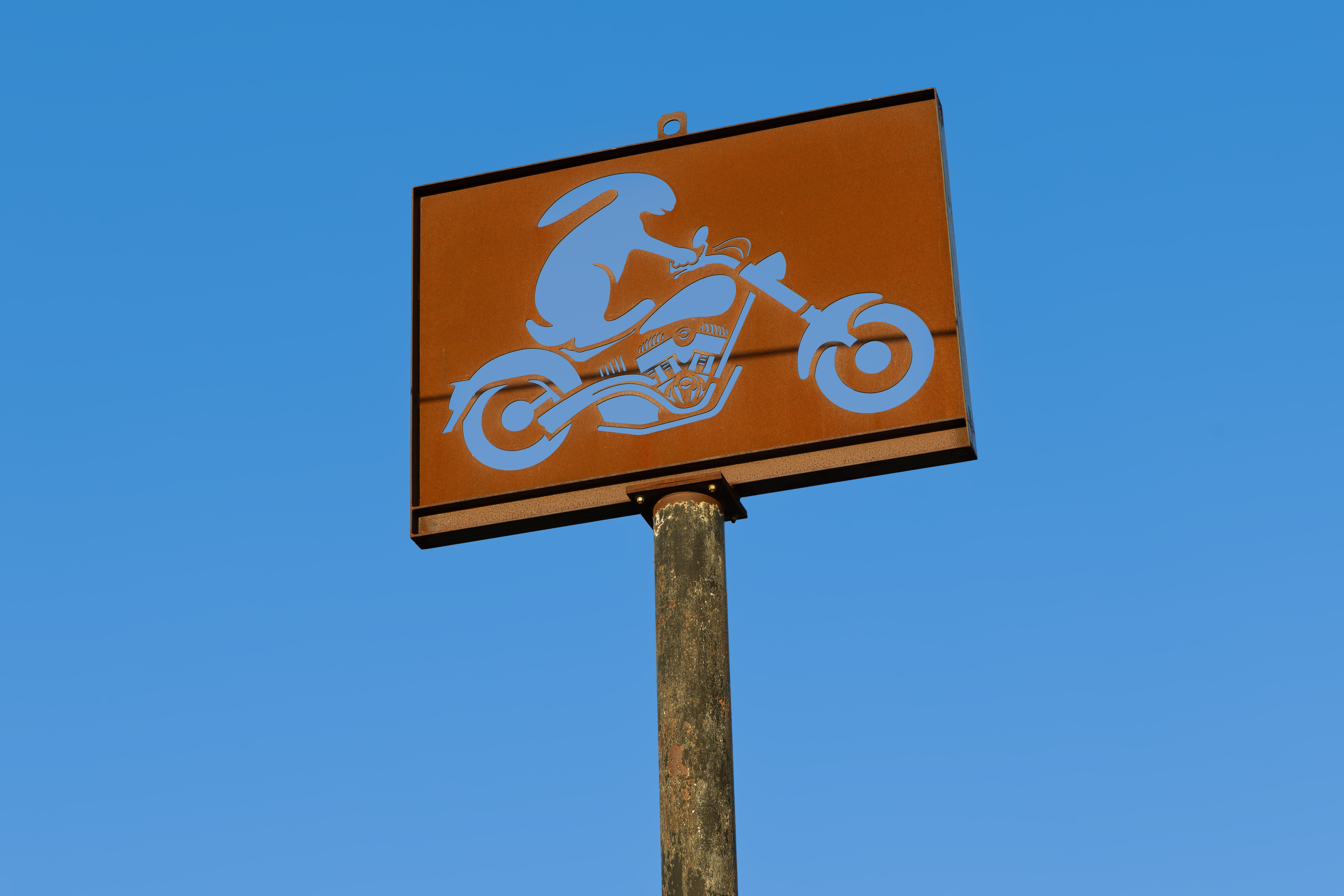
Newer sign

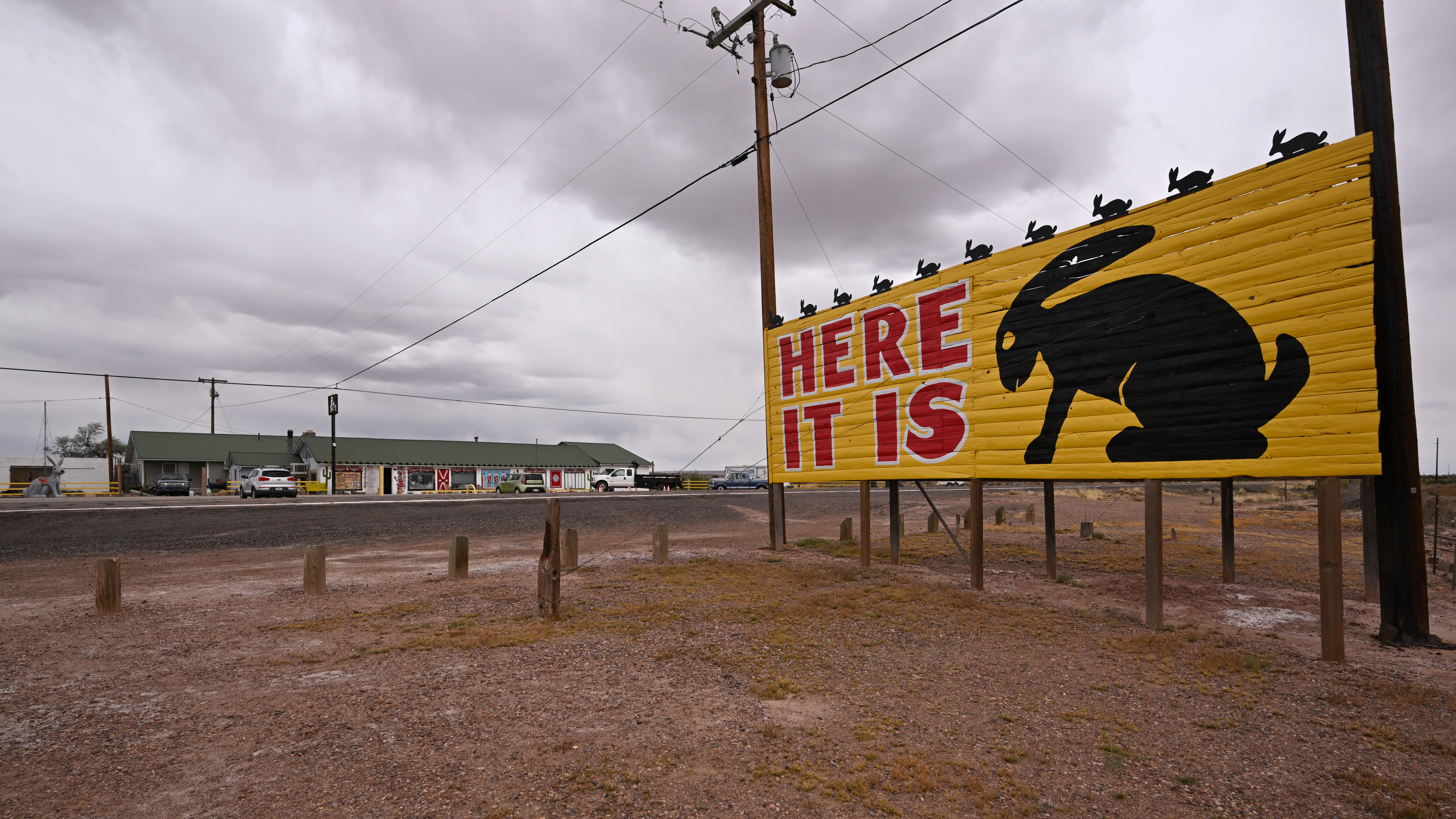
"Here It Is" sign with trading post in background

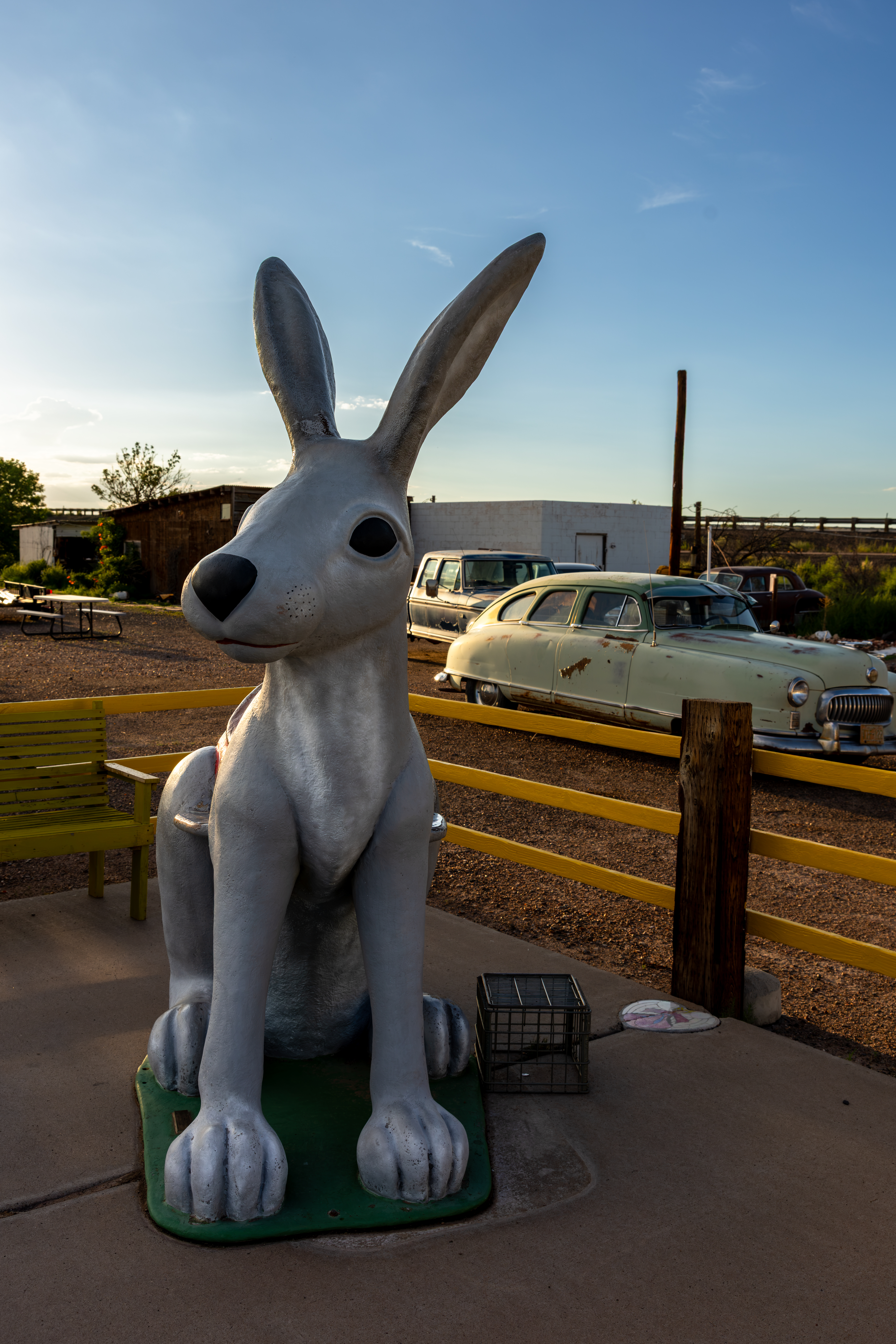
The jackrabbit

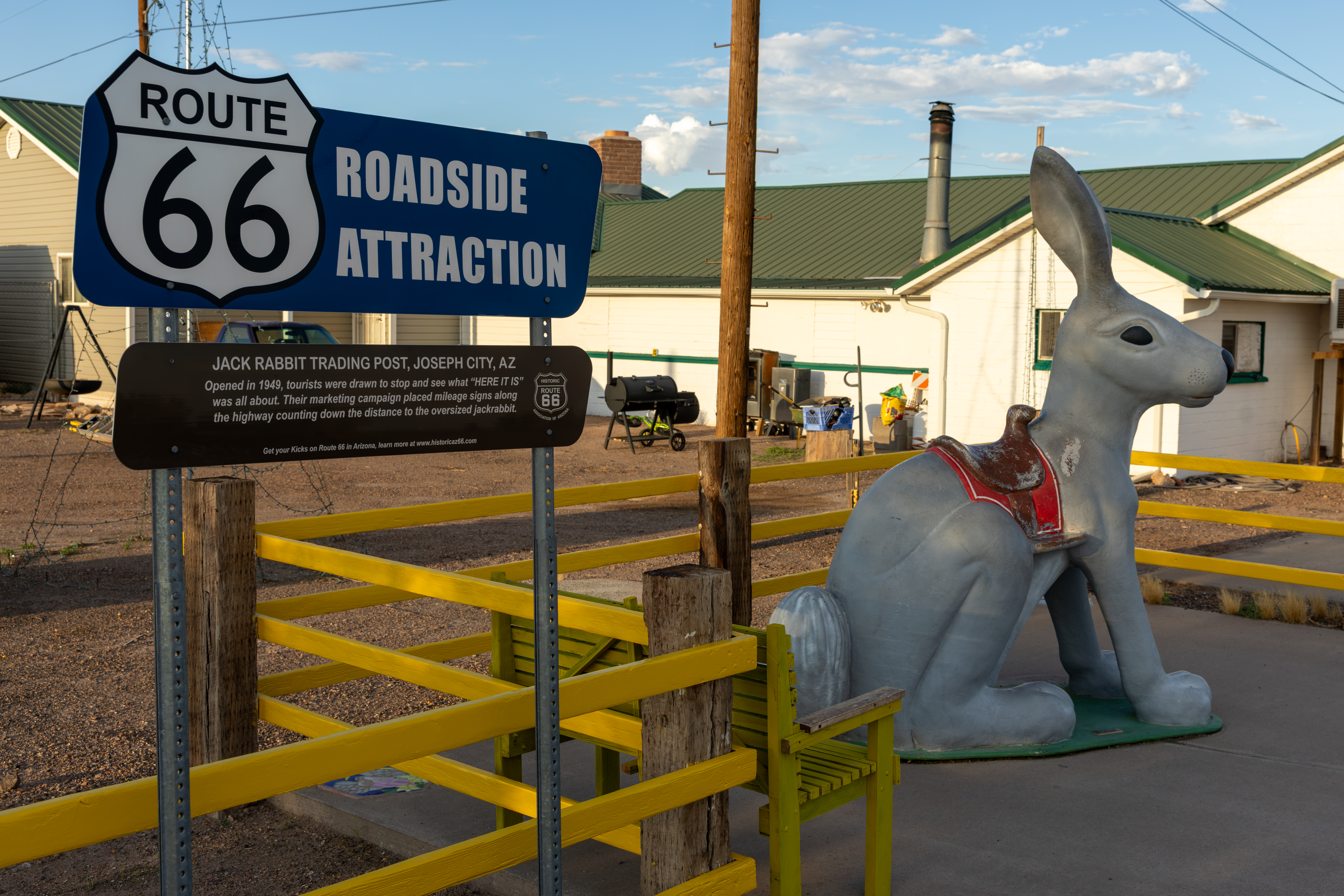
Route 66 Roadside Attraction marker and jackrabbit

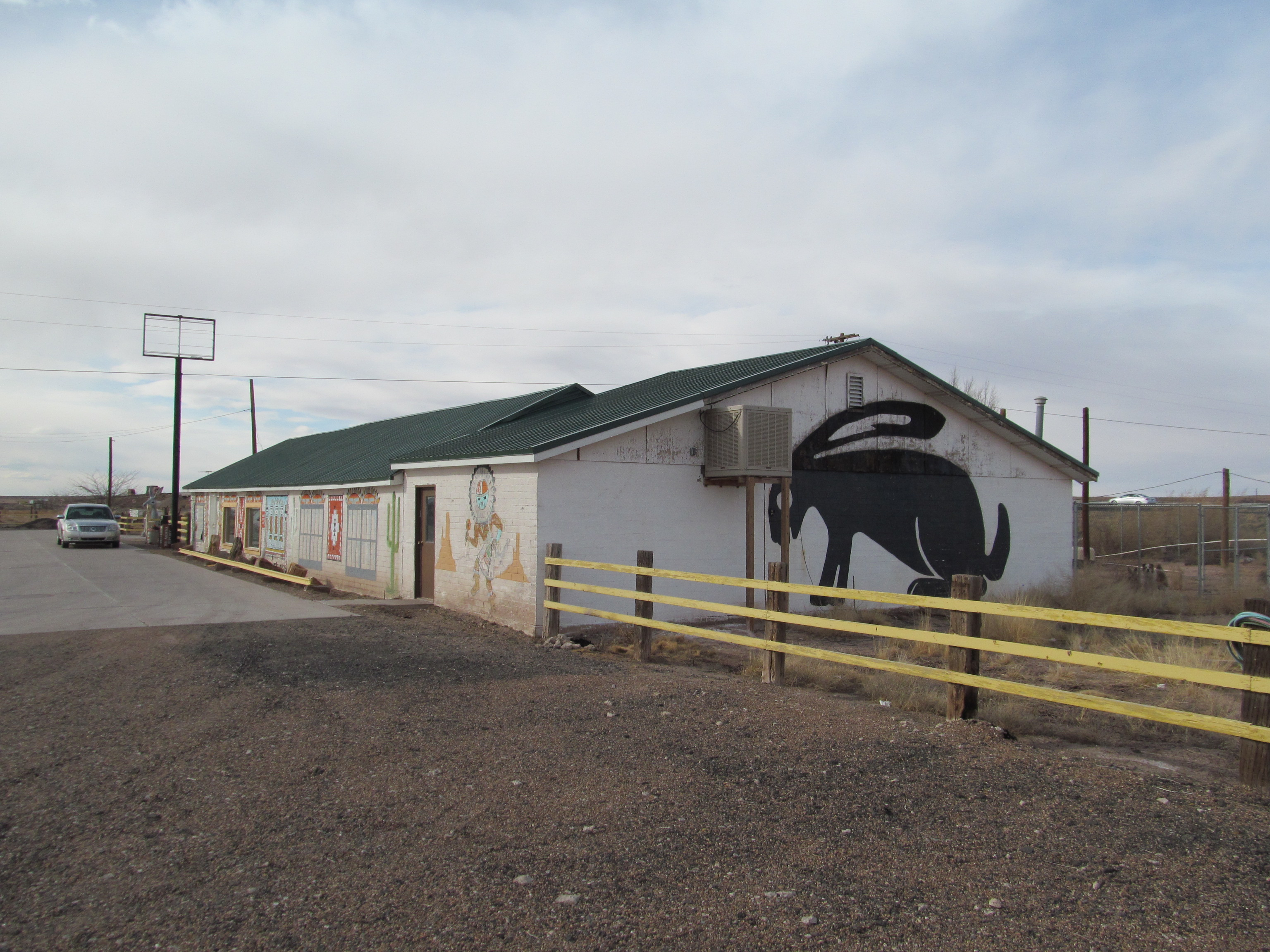
Side of the trading post in 2012

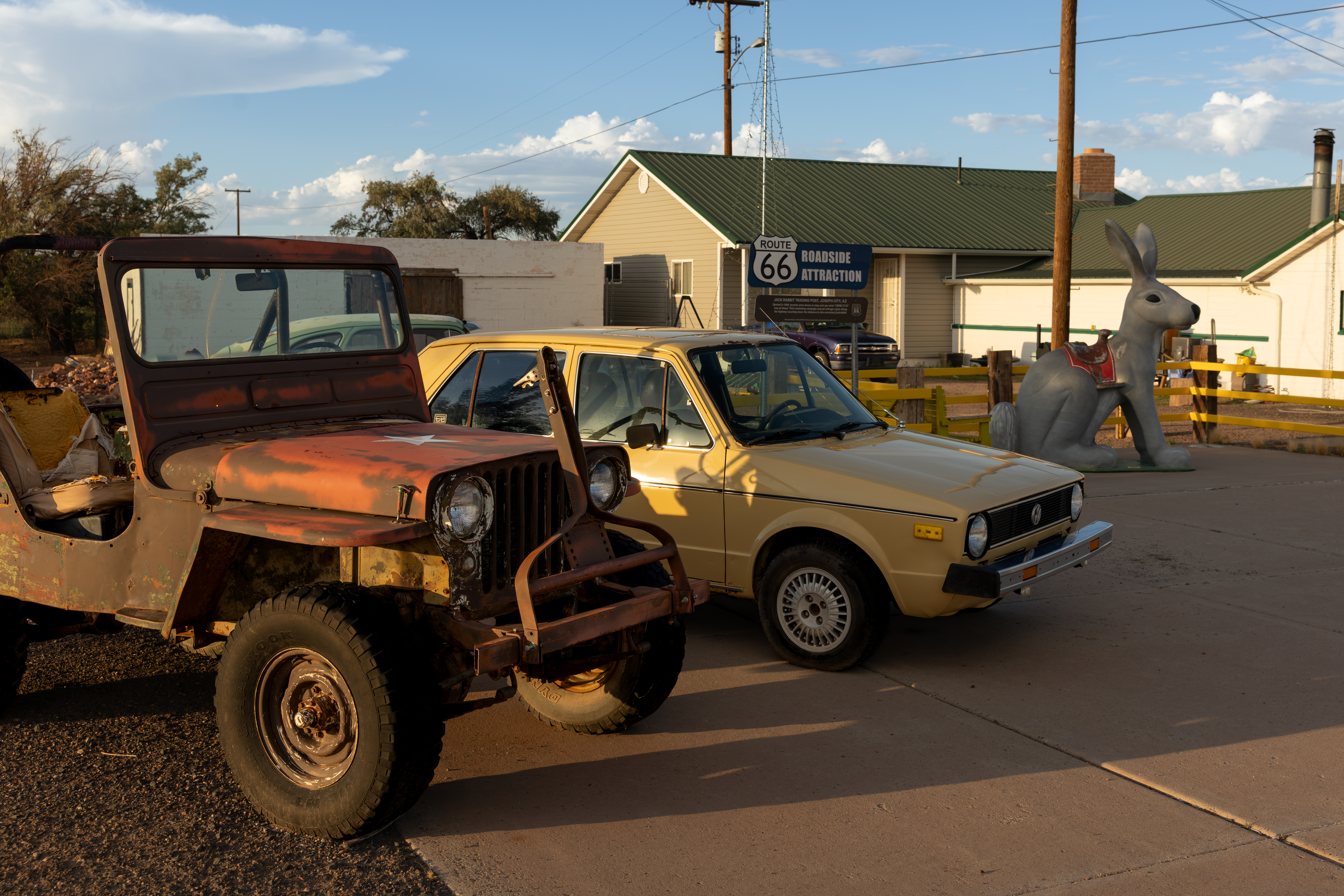
Vintage vehicles at the trading post

== See also ==
- List of landmarks on U.S. Route 66
- Roadside attraction
- U.S. Route 66 in Arizona
