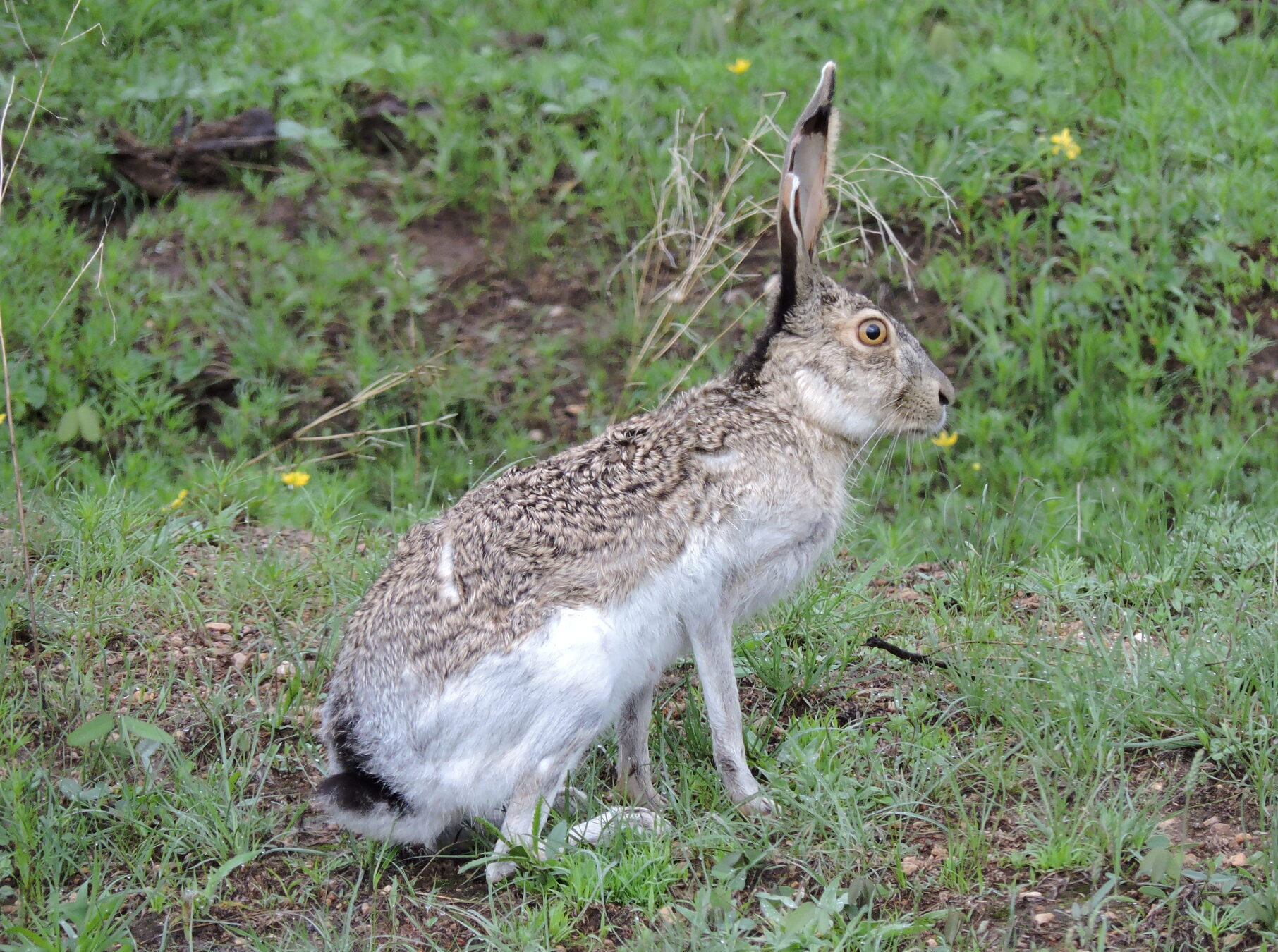
- White-sided jackrabbit (Lepus callotis callotis) in Durango, Mexico

Conservation status
- Vulnerable (IUCN 3.1)

- Apparently Secure (NatureServe)

Scientific classification
- Kingdom: Animalia
- Phylum: Chordata
- Class: Mammalia
- Infraclass: Placentalia
- Order: Lagomorpha
- Family: Leporidae
- Genus: Lepus
- Species: L. callotis

Binomial name
- Lepus callotis Wagler, 1830
- White-sided jackrabbit range

Synonyms
- Lepus mexicanus H. Lichtenstein, 1830; Lepus nigricaudatus E. T. Bennett, 1833; Lepus calotis Fitzinger, 1867; Lepus gaillardi Mearns, 1896; Macrotolagus gaillardi bottyi (Shamel, 1942)

= White-sided jackrabbit =

Species of mammal

The white-sided jackrabbit (Lepus callotis) (Spanish: liebre torda), also known as the Mexican hare, beautiful-eared jackrabbit, Gaillard jackrabbit, or snow sides, is a medium-sized hare native to the United States and Mexico. It has cinnamon, ochre, and black fur on its head and body and notably white-furred sides. The hare is found in a limited range in North America, from southern New Mexico to northwestern and central Mexico. It avoids hilly habitats and is often found in grasslands, with preferred areas being flush in tobosagrass and blue grama, among other grasses the hare uses for food. The hare is also found in savanna and pasture habitats, particularly in the more southerly parts of its distribution.

White-sided jackrabbits make shelters out of depressions dug in the earth, known as forms, which is a common behavior among hares. The forms made by the white-sided jackrabbit are somewhat more elaborate than those of other hare species, though, and are often surrounded by dense grasses. This hare is most active during the night and at dusk. While most hares will run immediately upon sensing a predator, this species will often remain still or try to escape through grasses undetected; otherwise, it will make high, long jumps away from a threat, flashing its white sides. White-sided jackrabbits are often found in pairs, and during the breeding season, a male and female jackrabbit will form a pair bond and remain by each others' side, the male protecting the female from other competing males. Predators of the jackrabbit include bobcats, coyotes, kit foxes, Swainson's hawks and red-tailed hawks.

The animal is considered threatened in New Mexico, with its numbers in decline in recent years; its presence is uncertain in Arizona. Individuals in New Mexico are frequently killed by United States Border Patrol vehicles. Throughout the rest of its range, the white-sided jackrabbit is hunted for food and for sport, though it has been considered a rare species since at least the 1950s. The International Union for Conservation of Nature considers it to be a vulnerable species, and it is assessed as an "apparently secure" species by NatureServe. Information on the white-sided jackrabbit's ecology is limited by a lack of studies. The species' range as measured in 2018 is expected to see an 80% reduction by 2050 due to climate change.

== Taxonomy and etymology ==
The white-sided jackrabbit was first described in 1830 by the German naturalist Johann Georg Wagler. He gave it the scientific name Lepus callotis and noted that it was smaller than the mountain hare (Lepus timidus) but had longer ears. The species' type locality was given as simply "Mexico"; this was clarified as the southern end of the Mexican Plateau by American naturalist Edward William Nelson in 1909. Nothing is known about the white-sided jackrabbit's holotype. Its genus name, Lepus, is Latin for 'hare'. The species name, callotis, is derived from Greek, being a combination of the words call, 'beautiful', and ot, 'ear'.

Common names for this species include the beautiful-eared jackrabbit, Gaillard jackrabbit (referring to the subspecies Lepus calloris gaillardi), snow sides, and in Spanish, liebre torda, liebre pinta, or liebre de flancos blancos.

There are two recognized subspecies of the white-sided jackrabbit:

- Lepus callotis callotis Wagler, 1830. Synonymous with Lepus mexicanus (Lichtenstein, 1830) and Lepus nigricaudatus (Bennett, 1833).
- Lepus callotis gaillardi Mearns, 1895. Type specimen collected along the Mexico–United States border in the Playas Valley by Edgar Alexander Mearns; synonymous with Lepus battyi (J. Allen, 1903).

The subspecies L. c. gaillardi is distinguished from the nominate subspecies by a paler fur coat and preference for colder grassland habitats with abundant buffalo grass. Another population of hares, the Tamaulipas jackrabbit (Lepus altamirae), has variously been considered a subspecies of either the white-sided jackrabbit or the black-tailed jackrabbit (L. californicus) up until 2016.

A phylogenetic tree produced by Leandro Iraçabal and colleagues in 2024, based on a large sample size of genetic markers, concluded that the white-sided jackrabbit is most closely related to the Tehuantepec jackrabbit (L. flavigularis). These hares were placed in the sister clade to a group containing the black-tailed jackrabbit and the antelope jackrabbit (L. alleni). The next-closest relative to these hares is the snowshoe hare (L. americanus):

- - - - Lepus callotis
      - Lepus flavigularis
    - - Lepus californicus
      - Lepus alleni
  - Lepus americanus
- Other hares

There are no known fossils of the white-sided jackrabbit, though this has been attributed to difficulties in telling apart its bones from those of the black-tailed jackrabbit. A single fossil specimen found in Eddy County, New Mexico dating back roughly 7,400 years may represent the white-sided jackrabbit. The fossil was initially assigned to the antelope jackrabbit.

== Description ==
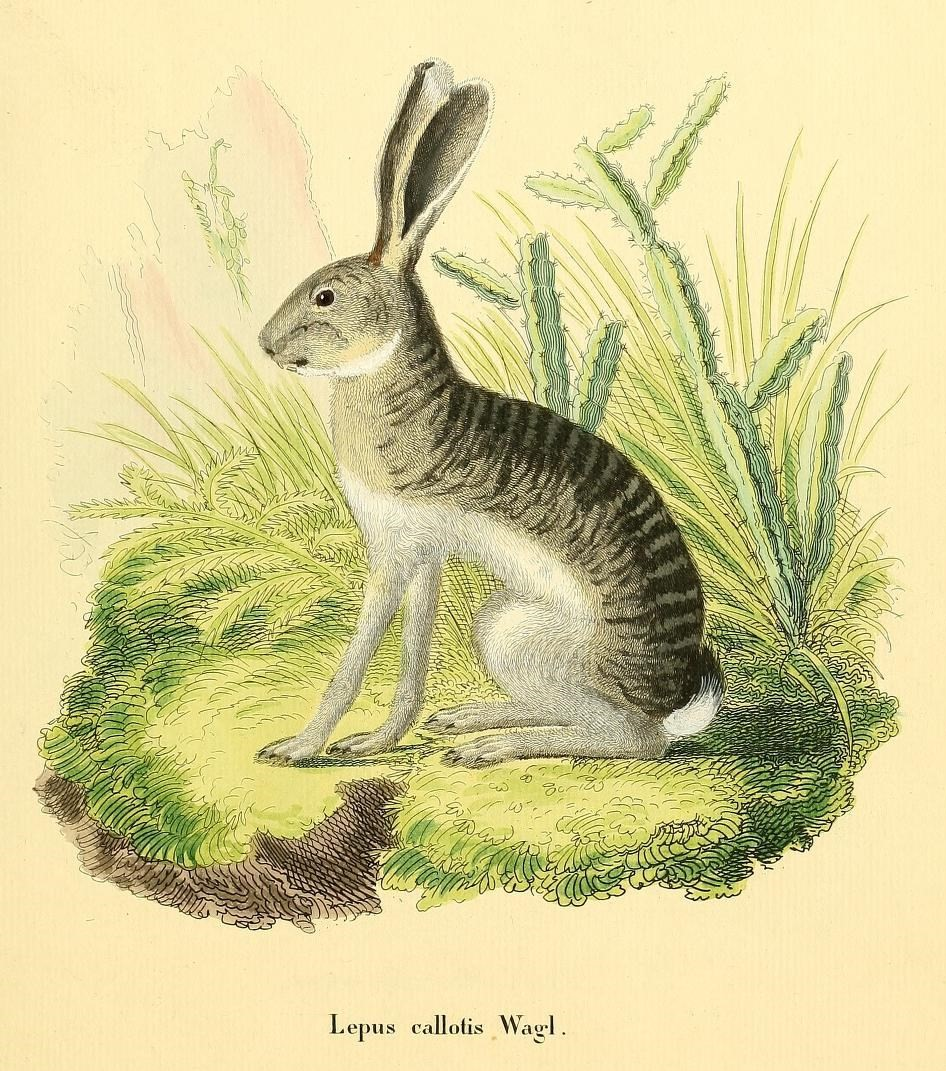
Illustration of the white-sided jackrabbit by German engraver Andreas Fleischmann (1811-1878)

The white-sided jackrabbit is a medium-sized hare. Its adult body length ranges from roughly 17 to 24 inches (43 to 60 centimeters) long. Its short tail grows to lengths of 1 to 4 in (2.5 to 10.2 cm). Its legs grow from 4 to 6 in (10 to 15 cm) in the front and the back legs can grow from 6 to 12 in (15 to 30 cm) long. The white-sided jackrabbit's ears grow 2 to 6 in (5.1 to 15.2 cm) when fully grown. The fore paws have five toes while the back paws have four. All toes end in sturdy claws. Some sexual dimorphism is present in this species; females are generally larger than the males. Adults weigh between 3.3 and 5.1 pounds (1.5 and 2.3 kilograms).

The white-sided jackrabbit's fur varies in color across its body. Along the back, it is a light ocherous cinnamon and black mixture, and along the sides, it is white. White fur also covers the hare's rump, thighs, and limbs. The tail is white underneath and black above. The hare's back fur has also been described as buff or fawn. The thighs and rump have also been described as more iron gray than white. Towards the head, there is a black or brown patch of fur at the nape (on the back of the neck). The same cinnamon and ochre fur color is seen around most of the head, though the eyes and ears are fringed with white. Darker, dusky patches are seen at the back of the ears.

The species can vary in fur color depending on grographic location and subspecies. Lighter fur colors have been observed in populations within the state of Chihuahua, and while L. c. callotis has a black patch on its nape, this same patch is brown in L. c. gaillardi.

The winter pelage of the white-sided jackrabbit is difficult to distinguish from the summer coat, with its main differentiating factor being the length of the fur. The difference in color is very slight. The hairs of the winter coat are longer than those of the summer coat. Once a year, in early summer, the white-sided jackrabbit will molt, shedding a layer of fur. The molt starts at the back of the hare, with fur being shed gradually towards the head. At night, the jackrabbit has a visibly reddish eyeshine.

Like other hares and rabbits, it has a dental formula of 2.0.3.31.0.2.3 × 2 = 28, indicating that it has two pairs of upper and one pair of lower incisors, no canines, three upper and two lower premolars on each side, and three upper and lower molars on either side of the jaw. The bones that enclose the middle and inner ear, the auditory bullae, are large, though slightly shorter in length than a row of the hare's molars. The white-sided jackrabbit's skull is wide and tall, with especially long nasal bones and an elevated, large brow ridge. The sizes of its teeth are comparable to those of most other hares, and the back part of its skull—its braincase—is of average size. Besides the white-sided jackrabbit having slightly shorter and less tapered nasal bones than the black-tailed jackrabbit, the skulls of the two species are nearly indistinguishable; they can only be differentiated by their fur colors, as the white-sided jackrabbit has distinct gray flanks and white ear tips, as well as being more yellow overall. The sympatric antelope jackrabbit can be told apart from the white-sided jackrabbit by its larger body and longer ears. The similar-looking Tehuantepec jackrabbit is typically larger than the white-sided jackrabbit.

== Distribution and habitat ==
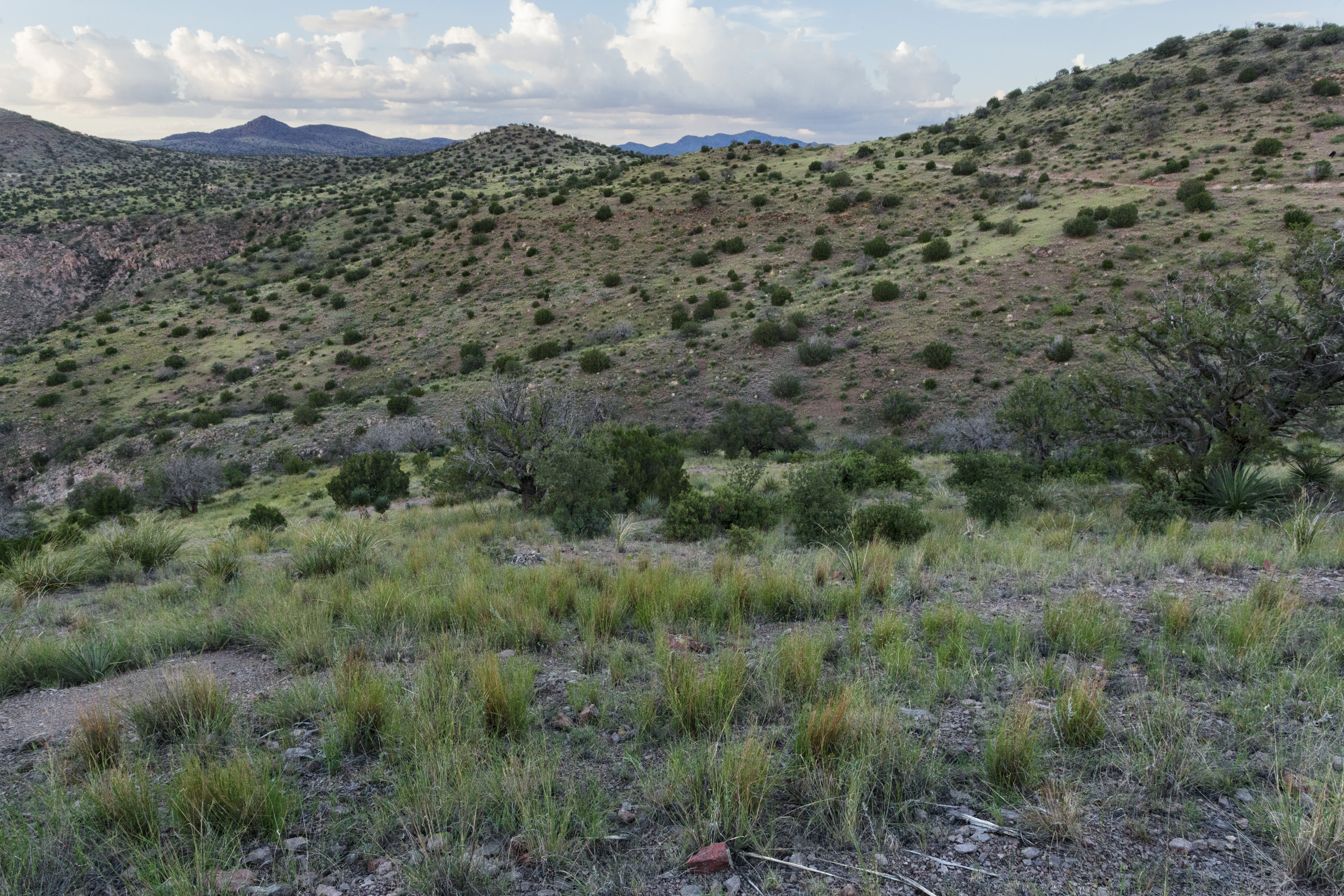
Regions in southwestern New Mexico with plenty of blue grama and similar grasses are home to some white-sided jackrabbits.

The white-sided jackrabbit is found from the south of New Mexico down to the Mexican state of Oaxaca. The hare's range extends throughout the central highlands of Mexico. It occurs alongside the black-tailed jackrabbit, as well as the antelope jackrabbit. L. callotis gaillardi is present in isolated regions throughout the species' northern distribution, occurring in New Mexico and the Mexican states of Chihuahua and Durango. Two individuals from this subspecies were seen in Arizona in 1950 near the Huachuca Mountains, but the white-sided jackrabbit's continued presence in this state is uncertain. L. c. callotis is found in a region extending from eastern Durango to northern Guerrero and Oaxaca. One report in 2020 by Fuentes-Moreno and colleagues found evidence of the white-sided jackrabbit in the Oaxaca Valley, where it had not been seen for 116 years. L. c. gaillardi is generally associated with cooler habitats than those inhabited by L. c. callotis.

The white-sided jackrabbit inhabits grasslands at elevations between 2,460 and 8,370 feet (750 and 2,550 m). They are found at their lowest elevations in the state of Morelos and at their highest in north Puebla. White-sided jackrabbit habitats are more restricted in northerly populations; those in New Mexico and Zacatecas are only found in the plains of the Madrean region and open grasslands, but south of the Nazas River, the hare is found in savannas and pastures. White-sided jackrabbits avoid hills and dense forests, preferring regions with sparse shrub cover, tobosa grass, and blue grama. In the Perote Valley of Mexico, they inhabit regions that make up an ecotone between coniferous forest, scrub, and grasslands.

== Behavior and ecology ==
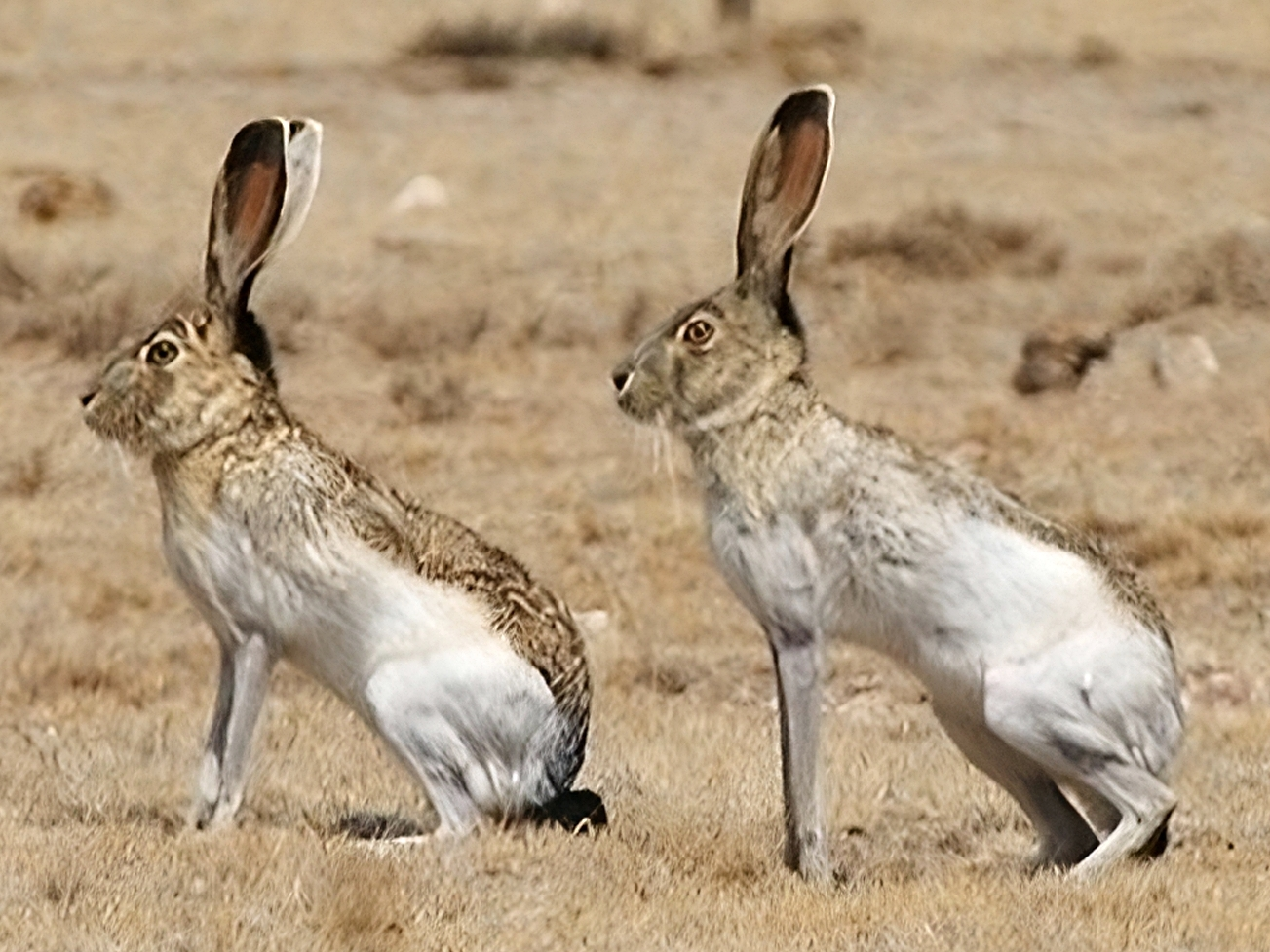
A pair of white-sided jackrabbits seen in San Luis Potosí, Mexico

=== Behavior ===
White-sided jackrabbits are most active during the night or at dusk. They are less active when faced with wind, cloud cover and precipitation. They have a unique escape behavior consisting of alternately flashing its white sides to potential predators when running away. When escaping, they also make long, high leaps, jumping straight up and extending their hind legs. They may also choose to remain still to avoid detection rather than immediately hopping away, and have also been seen trying to escape through dense grasses. A conspicuous trait of the white-sided jackrabbit is its tendency to be found in pairs. Male and female jackrabbits will form a pair bond that is strongest during the breeding season (April–October). After establishment of the pair bond, the male defends the pair from other intruding males, and the two remain within a roughly 16-foot (5 m) radius.

The white-sided jackrabbit constructs and uses depressions in the ground for shelter, known as forms. This behavior is common among hares, but forms made by the white-sided jackrabbit are notably more elaborate than most, averaging 15 in (37 cm) in length, 7.1 in (18 cm) in width, and 2.4 in (6 cm) in depth. Forms are often dug in areas surrounded by dense grasses and occasionally extend below the surface of the soil. Rarely, the jackrabbit may use underground shelters or burrows from other animals.

The species will make three different kinds of vocalizations. The first, given in response to a fear or alarm reaction, is a high-pitched scream. The second is a response to a male intruding on another male's territory. A series of harsh grunts is repeated until the intruding male leaves, either on its own or due to being chased away. Finally, the white-sided jackrabbit is known to emit a trilling grunt during sexual chases between males and females. It is not clear whether the male or the female emits this vocalization.

=== Reproduction ===
White-sided jackrabbits are thought to be monogamous. They are often found in pairs, especially during their breeding season. Breeding habits of the species have been poorly recorded.

The breeding season of the white-sided jackrabbit typically occurs from mid-April to mid-August, but may begin earlier in mid-March and end as late as mid-October. Adult females will produce three litters every year, yielding one to four young each litter and two on average. Gestation lasts for 42 days. The young are born in burrows, fully furred with a soft, woolly coat. Their fur is largely buff-colored but may range towards a more cinnamon tone on their upper body.

=== Ecology ===
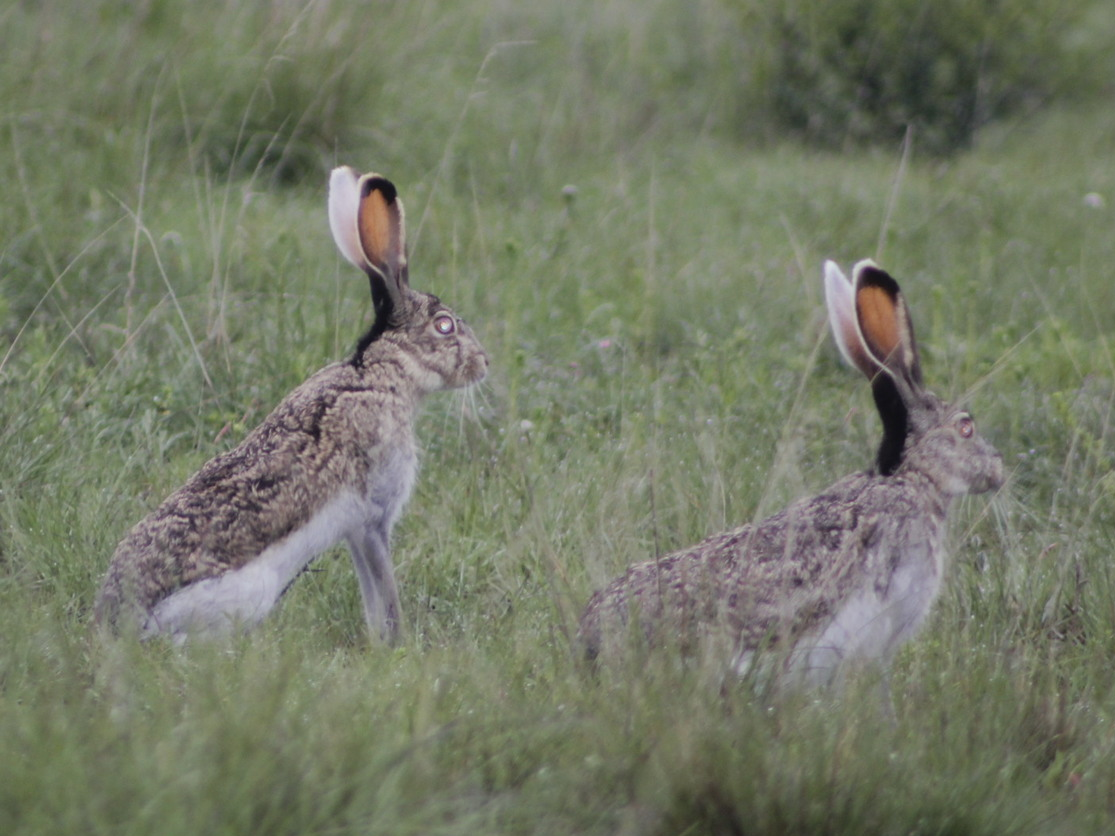
A pair of white-sided jackrabbits in Jalisco, Mexico

The population density of the white-sided jackrabbit has been measured at its highest in regions where grasses cover most of the available land. In 1993, the jackrabbit's population density was measured at an average of one every 32 hectares.

==== Diet ====
The diet of the white-sided jackrabbit consists primarily of grasses, but during dry periods may also include roots. Forbs also make up part of its diet. The jackrabbit forages for food by pulling grasses up out of the ground and chewing on them while remaining upright, scanning for predators. It does not eat discarded stems that end up on the ground. Among the grasses known to make up its diet are buffalograss, tobosagrass, fiddleneck, wolftail, blue grama, vine mesquite, ring muhly, wooly Indian wheat, and Wright buckwheat. One nongrass food item was nut grass, which is a sedge that produces fibrous roots and tubers. The tubers are excavated by white-sided jackrabbits from the ground using their forepaws, which leaves small depressions in the ground. The jackrabbits will often leave fecal pellets near and in these depressions.

==== Predators, parasites and diseases ====
The white-sided jackrabbit is a prey species in its native range, and has a wide variety of predators. Significant threats within its range are terrestrial carnivores such as bobcats, coyotes, and kit foxes, as well as birds of prey like Swainson's hawks and red-tailed hawks. The golden eagle is also thought to be a significant predator of the jackrabbit. Several parasites have been found on the white-sided jackrabbit, such as Dermacentor paramapertus, a tick, and Pulex simulans, a flea. A wide variety of microorganisms have been isolated from the jackrabbit, including one coccidian and bacteria such as Yersinia pseudotuberculosis and Pseudomonas pseudomallei. It is not as susceptible to tapeworms and botfly larvae as are other jackrabbits around its distribution.

== Human interaction and impact ==
White-sided jackrabbits are hunted in Mexico for their meat and for sport, particularly in the states of Chihuahua and Zacatecas. They have been considered a rare species since at least the 1950s. A 2011 study by the New Mexico Department of Game and Fish determined that the primary cause of decline of the white-sided jackrabbit in New Mexico was due to road kill caused by nighttime US Border Patrol traffic. It was estimated that only about 60 white-sided jackrabbits were left in the United States at this time. Though at least one of these jackrabbits is known to occur on a protected ranch in New Mexico, most of the land the species occupies in this region is privately owned.

=== Conservation status ===
The white-sided jackrabbit is considered endangered throughout its range in Mexico, and has been listed as "threatened" by the state of New Mexico since 1975. The population of white-sided jackrabbits in New Mexico has declined from a high of 400 total animals in 1976 down to just 58 in 2010, and from nearly 13,000 across its entire range down to roughly 2,100 in the same time period. Its range frequently overlaps regions that are used for agriculture; the overgrazing of domestic livestock in these regions may be one of the factors contributing to its decline and apparent replacement by the black-tailed jackrabbit (Lepus californicus), which has been highly adaptable to these habitat changes. Other sources of stress on the white-sided jackrabbit include vehicle collisions, feral dogs and other introduced predators, fires, and hunting. It has been considered a vulnerable species by the International Union for Conservation of Nature since 2019. The northern populations of the species are considered more vulnerable to contraction than those in the south. A 2009 petition to provide the species protections under the Endangered Species Act was rejected on the grounds that it was not considered "at risk" in Mexico, despite evidence of it being endangered throughout its entire range. The United States Fish and Wildlife Service concluded in 2010 that the species' habitat may actually be improved in the long term by fire management techniques. A later NatureServe assessment of the species in 2015 stated that better information was needed on its abundance throughout Mexico, and that high-quality grassland habitats needed protection. In a 2026 account of the species, authors Consuelo Lorenzo and Arturo Carrillo-Reyes advised that additional research is needed on the species' population dynamics (including the distinctions between subspecies), habitat conditions and alterations, relationships with conspecifics within its range, and how it is impacted by disease outbreaks and climate change. In 2018, the white-sided jackrabbit's range was predicted to see a reduction of 80% by 2050 due to climate change.
