= Jackrabbit, Arizona =

Former mining community in the United States

- Populated place
- Location within the state of Arizona Jackrabbit (the United States)
- Coordinates: 32°36′19″N 111°53′45″W
- Country: United States
- State: Arizona
- County: Pinal
- Elevation: 1,540 ft (470 m)
- Time zone: UTC-7 (Mountain (MST))
  - Summer (DST): UTC-7 (MST)
- Area code: 928
- FIPS code: 04-35690
- GNIS feature ID: 24472

Jackrabbit was an early 20th century mining community in Pinal County, Arizona, USA, just north of the border of Pima County. It has an estimated elevation of 1,542 feet (470 m) above sea level.

The Jackrabbit area is located at the northern end of the Slate Mountains and includes the Jackrabbit, Turning Point, and the Desert Queen Mines. Mining activity peaked in 1910 when human settlement in the area was concentrated in the community of Jackrabbit. By 1960, there was no active mining in the area, few remains of any building or equipment, and no human habitation.
