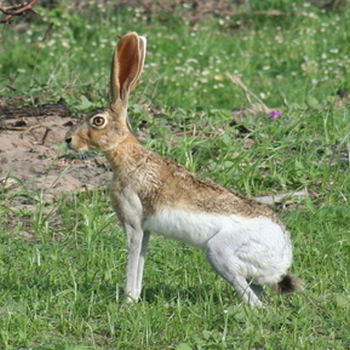

Conservation status
- Endangered (IUCN 3.1)

Scientific classification
- Kingdom: Animalia
- Phylum: Chordata
- Class: Mammalia
- Order: Lagomorpha
- Family: Leporidae
- Genus: Lepus
- Species: L. flavigularis

Binomial name
- Lepus flavigularis Wagner, 1844
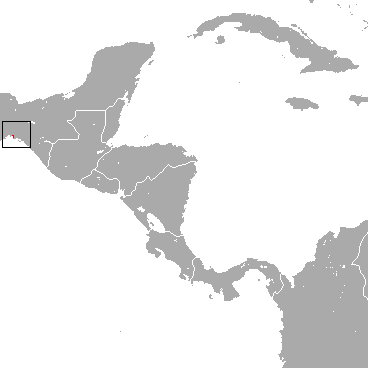
- Tehuantepec jackrabbit range
- Range map centered on Oaxaca Extant (resident)

= Tehuantepec jackrabbit =

Species of mammal

The Tehuantepec jackrabbit (Lepus flavigularis) (Spanish: liebre de Tehuantepec) is a medium-sized species of hare in the family Leporidae that is endemic to eastern Oaxaca, Mexico. It exists in three separated populations, living on grassy dunes and savannas, and is herbivorous, mainly eating grasses. It is not territorial. Most active at night, it will feed for most of the time and occasionally groom or socialize with other hares, spending the daytime resting on beds of grass or shrubs, or under nopales. They are polygynous and breed for most of the year, from February to December, producing one to four young per breeding season. Predators include snakes, dogs, cats, coyotes, and gray foxes.

The Tehuantepec jackrabbit is the most endangered of the hares, with less than 300 mature individuals estimated as of 2019, and is threatened by various factors in its small distribution, including poaching, habitat loss and fragmentation, a small population size, and genetic isolation. Changing agricultural practices, loss of diversity in flora, and competition for food are also factors in the species' decline. It is recognized as endangered both by the International Union for the Conservation of Nature (IUCN) and local authorities in Mexico through the Official Journal of the Federation, and efforts to monitor and implement conservation actions have been ongoing.

== Taxonomy ==
Lepus flavigularis was first described in 1844 by Johann Andreas Wagner in a reassessment of Johann Georg Wagler's 1830 description of several Mexican hares. The species was noted as displaying the "extremes" in coloration of each of the two other hares in question: the white-sided jackrabbit (Lepus callotis) and the black-tailed hare (Lepus nigricaudatus), the latter of which is now synonymous with L. callotis. The type locality was given simply as Mexico; American zoologist Daniel Giraud Elliot later restricted this in a 1905 checklist of mammals to San Mateo del Mar, Tehuantepec [City], Oaxaca, Mexico. At the time, it was considered a subspecies of the white-sided jackrabbit (then known as the "beautiful-eared jack rabbit"). L. flavigularis was later classified as a distinct species by Edward William Nelson following a numerical analysis of morphological traits in 1909.

Besides the common name Tehuantepec jackrabbit, so called for its type locality, it is also known in Spanish as the liebre tropical, or tropical hare.

=== Phylogeny ===
The Tehuantepec jackrabbit is closely related to the white-sided jackrabbit. They are grouped together in a subclade separate from other American members of Lepus, such as the black-tailed (Lepus californicus) and white-tailed (Lepus townsendii) jackrabbits. The next-closest related species to L. flavigularis, the antelope jackrabbit (Lepus alleni), likely diverged from the white-sided jackrabbit when a population of the latter species became isolated along the western coastal plains of Mexico. Similarly, L. flavigularis diverged from the white-sided jackrabbit following isolation in southeastern Oaxaca. None of these three species overlap in distribution.

L. flavigularis has 48 diploid chromosomes, a number shared by every other member of Lepus. The species' fundamental number of chromosomes is 88, and it has a large X chromosome, a trait shared by the antelope jackrabbit and black-tailed jackrabbit. There are no subspecies of the Tehuantepec jackrabbit, and no fossils are known. The population in the Santa María del Mar area of Juchitán de Zaragoza municipality, the northernmost population of the species, is separated by water and human-built structures from other populations of the species, and has very little gene flow, resulting in its separation into a distinct clade.

== Characteristics ==
Lepus flavigularis is a medium-sized hare, ranging in length from 22.2 to 24.0 inches (56.5 to 61 cm). The chest and neck are yellowish in color, and it can be distinguished from other species by two black stripes that run from the base of the ears to the nape, and by its white flanks. This same coloration of the nape is also noted in several subspecies of the black-tailed jackrabbit. The tail measures from 2.6 to 3.7 inches (65 to 95 mm) and is black above and white underneath. Adults weigh from 3.7 to 6.4 pounds (1.7 to 2.9 kg). The ears range in size from 4.3 to 4.7 inches (110 to 120 mm) and the hind foot from 4.5 to 5.3 inches (115 to 134 mm). Its skull is elongated, and among the Mexican hares, its tympanic bullae (bone structures that enclose the middle and inner ear) are the smallest.

== Distribution and habitat ==
The Tehuantepec jackrabbit resides in tropical dry savannas dominated by native grasses in the genera Bouteloua and Paspalum with an overstory of sparse bushes of nanche (Byrsonima crassifolia), and scattered trees of morro (genus Crescentia). Generally, it tends towards habitats without dense vegetation, but can be flexible depending on the available resources. It is also found in coastal grassy dunes alongside the plants Opuntia decumbens, Opuntia tehuantepecana, and Sabal mexicana. It occurs from sea level up to an elevation of c. 2,185 feet (666 m).

It is endemic to Oaxaca, Mexico, and is only found along savannas and grassy dunes on the shores of the salt water lagoons known as Laguna Inferior and Laguna Superior connected to the Gulf of Tehuantepec in the Istmo de Tehuantepec region. Three small populations persist isolated from each other. It is not sympatric with any other hares.

The former distribution of the Tehuantepec jackrabbit is estimated to have extended along the Mexican Pacific Coast on the Isthmus of Tehuantepec from Salina Cruz in Oaxaca to Tonalá in Chiapas, an area of perhaps only 190 square miles (500 km^{2}). As of 2024, it is probably locally extinct in the Chiapas region.

== Behavior and ecology ==
Home ranges of Lepus flavigularis overlap with one or more individuals regardless of sex and age, and the home range size is about 50 ha with core areas of 9 ha for adult jackrabbits. The Tehuantepec jackrabbit is nocturnal and crepuscular, and spends much of its time feeding. It is not territorial, and while not grazing on plants, it grooms itself and socializes. During the day, it rests among grasses, shrubs, and under nopales either alone or in groups of up to 12 individuals.

The Tehuantepec jackrabbit shares its habitat with several other mammals, including the eastern cottontail, the nine-banded armadillo, hooded and western hog-nosed skunks, the Virginia opossum, the gray mouse opossum, and the common raccoon. Predators of the Tehuantepec jackrabbit and its young are domestic dogs, snakes (particularly Neotropical whip and western lyre snakes), domestic cats, coyotes, and gray foxes. There is little to no competition between the jackrabbit and the Eastern cottontail in regions where the two species are sympatric. The nematode Pelecitus meridionaleporinus (family Onchocercidae) is known to parasitize the Tehuantepec jackrabbit by infecting subcutaneous tissue at the base of the ears.

=== Diet ===
Lepus flavigularis prefers different plant species depending on whether it is the wet or dry season. Some of these species are present and consumed year-round, such as buffalo grass (Boutelota dactyloides), zacale (Cathestecum brevifolium), and southern crabgrass (Digitaria ciliaris). At least 18 species of plant are eaten by the Tehuantepec jackrabbit, and this diversity of food species is typical of hares worldwide. Also like other hares, the Tehuantepec jackrabbit consumes mostly grasses, with two thirds of its diet being plants in the genus Poaceae.

=== Reproduction ===
The Tehuantepec jackrabbit has a polygynous mating system. They tend to reproduce in pastures or open grasslands. The length of the breeding season may extend from February to December, with a peak in reproduction during the rainy season from May to October. Estrous lasts throughout the dry season, from November to April. The litter size is one to four embryos per breeding season.

== Threats ==
The Tehuantepec jackrabbit is the most endangered hare species. It is threatened by poaching, habitat loss and fragmentation, its small population size, and genetic isolation. Poaching in particular poses a threat in the Santa María del Mar area due to poor social and economic conditions. Introduction of exotic grasses, frequent and induced fires, agricultural and cattle-raising activities, and human settlements are deteriorating the diversity and native vegetation structure in savannas inhabited by Tehuantepec jackrabbits. Locally, the species is targeted by subsistence hunters, and is very occasionally taken as pets in rural communities. Sympatric eastern cottontails, as well as livestock such as cattle and horses, can compete for food or transmit diseases to the jackrabbit.

== Conservation ==
The Tehuantepec jackrabbit is listed as endangered in Mexico according to a 2019 issue of the Official Journal of the Federation, and as an endangered species by the International Union for the Conservation of Nature (IUCN), the latter of which notes that the population appears to be declining. The species' population was estimated at 292 mature individuals in 2019, with population density having decreased by roughly 80% since it was first measured in 2001. Mexican Academy of Sciences member Consuelo Lorenzo and colleagues, in the 2018 work Lagomorphs: Pikas, Rabbits, and Hares of the World, recommended continuous monitoring of the extant jackrabbit populations and studies on possible overgrazing in the region, as well as conservation actions such as paddock grassland management, proper grassland burning strategies, prevention of hunting, and environmental education programs. It was noted that implementation of rotational grazing could improve grassland quality. The species is protected by conservation sites across its entire range, and monitoring and recovery plans are in place.
