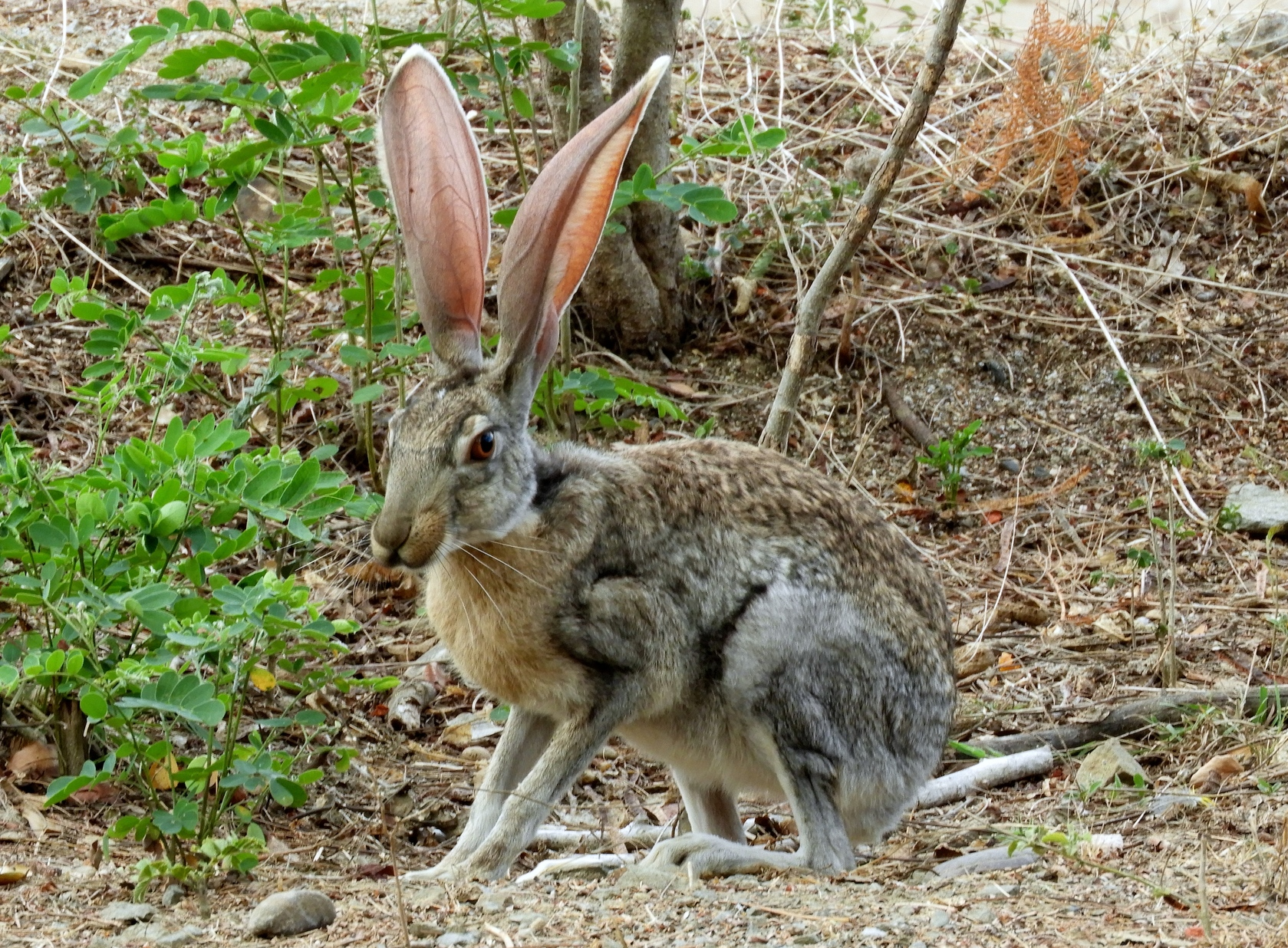
- Lepus alleni in Paco's Reserva de Flora y Fauna, Mazatlán

Conservation status
- Least Concern (IUCN 3.1)

Scientific classification
- Kingdom: Animalia
- Phylum: Chordata
- Class: Mammalia
- Infraclass: Placentalia
- Order: Lagomorpha
- Family: Leporidae
- Genus: Lepus
- Species: L. alleni

Binomial name
- Lepus alleni Mearns, 1890

Subspecies
- L. a. alleni R. S. Hoffmann & A. T. Smith, 2005; L. a. palitans Bangs, 1900; L. a. tiburonensis C. H. Townsend, 1912
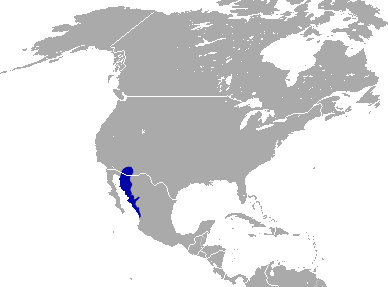
- Antelope jackrabbit range

= Antelope jackrabbit =

Species of mammal

The antelope jackrabbit (Lepus alleni), also known as Allen's hare, is a species of North American hare in the family Leporidae found in southern Arizona and northwestern Mexico. Considered the "handsomest" of the hares, it occupies dry desert areas and was one of the last of the North American mammals to be formally described.

== Taxonomy, etymology, and phylogeny ==
=== Taxonomy and etymology ===
The antelope jackrabbit was first described in 1890 by American naturalist Edgar Alexander Mearns, who named it "Allen's hare" (Lepus alleni) after Joel Asaph Allen, curator of mammals and birds at the American Museum of Natural History and the originator of Allen's rule.

=== Evolutionary history and phylogeny ===
Fossil evidence places the genus Lepus as having first appeared in North America approximately 2.5 million years ago. A now extinct jackrabbit species, Lepus giganteus, was thought to exist in North America during this time. This species shared similar physical traits with the antelope jackrabbit, making it difficult to differentiate fossils of the two species. In a 2014 study, researchers hypothesized that L. giganteus served as a common ancestor to the antelope jackrabbit and black-tailed jackrabbit (L. californicus). The black-tailed jackrabbit coexists with the antelope jackrabbit and the two species maintain a sympatric relationship. In the same 2014 study, genetic analysis concluded that three Lepus species share a common ancestor: L. callotis (white-sided jackrabbit), L. alleni (antelope jackrabbit), and L. flavigularis (Tehuantepec jackrabbit). Based on this evidence, researchers also concluded that the black-tailed jackrabbit, though closely related to white-sided jackrabbits, exists in its own separate subclade.

A later phylogenetic tree produced by Leandro Iraçabal and colleagues in 2024, based on a larger sample size of genetic markers, concluded that the black-tailed jackrabbit is in fact the antelope jackrabbit's closest relative. They placed the group containing these two species as sister to a group containing L. callotis and L. flavigularis.

Cladogram showing the genetic relationships between hare species

- - - - - - - - - - - Lepus castroviejoi
                    - Lepus corsicanus
                  - Lepus arcticus
                - Lepus othus
              - - Lepus timidus
                - Lepus townsendii
            - - - Lepus mandshuricus
                - Lepus coreanus
              - Lepus capensis
          - Lepus tolai
        - - Lepus yarkandensis
          - Lepus tibetanus
      - - - - - Lepus europaeus
              - Lepus habessinicus
            - Lepus granatensis
          - - - Lepus hainanus
              - Lepus peguensis
            - Lepus nigricollis
        - - Lepus comus
          - Lepus oiostolus
    - - - - - - Lepus californicus
              - Lepus alleni
            - - Lepus callotis
              - Lepus flavigularis
          - Lepus americanus
        - - - Lepus schlumbergeri
            - Lepus microtis
          - Lepus saxatilis
      - Lepus brachyurus
  - Lepus sinensis
- Rabbits

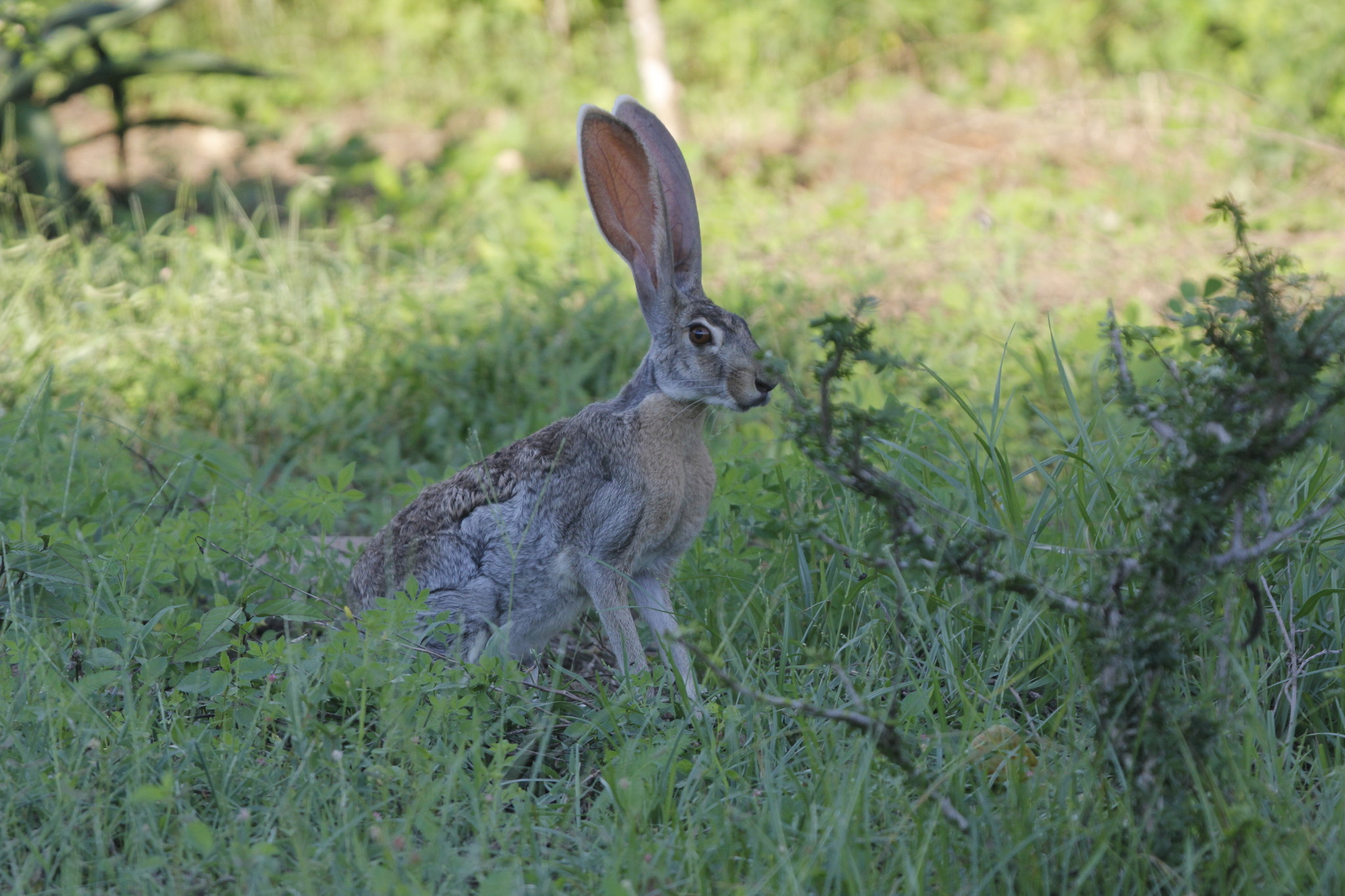
An antelope jackrabbit of subspecies L. a. palitans

=== Subspecies ===
The antelope jackrabbit has three recognized subspecies:

- L. a. alleni, the nominate subspecies that appears in parts of Arizona and northern Sonora
- L. a. palitans, which prefers moderate to low elevations across Sinaloa and southern Sonora
- L. a. tiburonensis, which is restricted to Tiburón Island

== Distribution and habitat ==
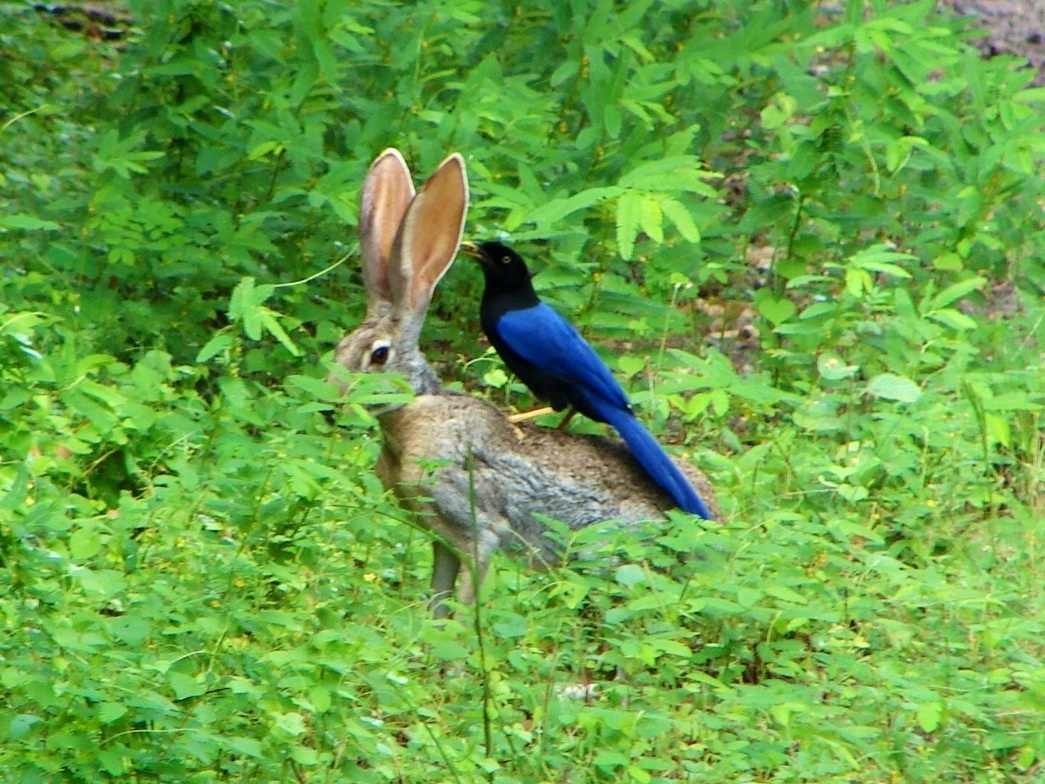
An antelope jackrabbit and a purplish-backed jay seen together

In the United States, the antelope jackrabbit is found in parts of Arizona and the states of Chihuahua, Nayarit, Sinaloa and Sonora in northwestern Mexico. It is also found on Tiburón Island in the Gulf of California, the largest island in Mexico. Compared to the other hare species present in North America, the antelope jackrabbit's range is limited. This species does not inhabit areas further east than the sky islands in Arizona and the Sierra Madre Occidental in Mexico. It also does not radiate west of Florence, Arizona. As of July 2017 it had been spotted and photographed by a National Park Ranger in the Lake Mead National Recreation Area in Nevada.

The antelope jackrabbit is found in a variety of tropic and subtropic habitats. It can be found in grassy hills or plains, preferring habitats with large, desert shrubs above long grass. This species can also be found in more barren desert habitats. A 2014 study focusing on ecology indicated that the ideal habitat for an antelope jackrabbit includes grassy ground cover and a mesquite overstory. This species does not prefer an arid climate; instead, antelope jackrabbits live in areas with summer precipitation amounts ranging from 90 mm to 360 mm. Unlike the black-tailed jackrabbit which survives in less humid conditions, the antelope jackrabbit inhabits locations with higher humidity.

== Description ==
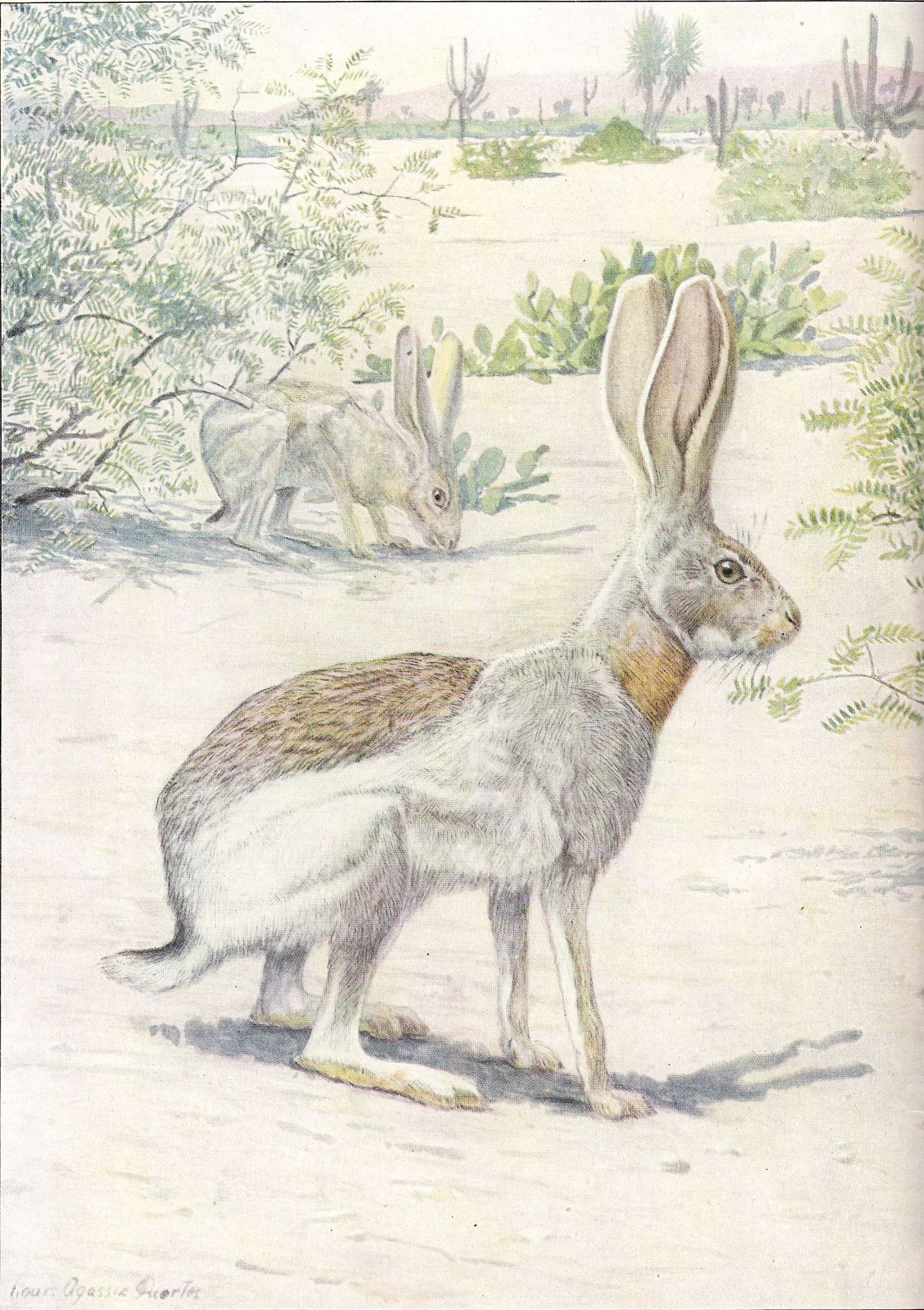
1918 illustration of antelope jackrabbits by Louis Agassiz Fuertes

The antelope jackrabbit is a large hare, and has been long considered the "handsomest" among the genus. Male and female antelope jackrabbits are identical in appearance. This species is large in size with long, pointed ears and a distinct coat coloration. The antelope jackrabbit has a white belly, light grey sides, a back peppered with black, and orange coloration on the neck and chest. It is similar to species like the black-tailed jackrabbit and white-sided jackrabbit. Its body length ranges from 52 to 58 centimeters (20 to 23 inches) long and its tail can be 5 to 10 cm (2 to 4 in) long. Its front legs grow to be 10 to 20 cm (4 to 8 in) and the back legs can grow to be 20 to 30 cm (8 to 12 in) long. The antelope jackrabbit's ears grow to be 14–17 cm (6–7 in) and it can weigh up to 9 pounds (4.1 kg). The species has a very large skull and a long rostrum. Its ears are extremely long with white on the point and edges. The two-colored tail is black on top and a pale grey below. The antelope jackrabbit's physiology, including the shape of its skull, contributes to its ability to move quickly through hopping, having an estimated top speed of 72 kilometers per hour (45 mph). The European hare (L. europaeus) is reported to have a similar top speed.

== Behaviour and ecology ==
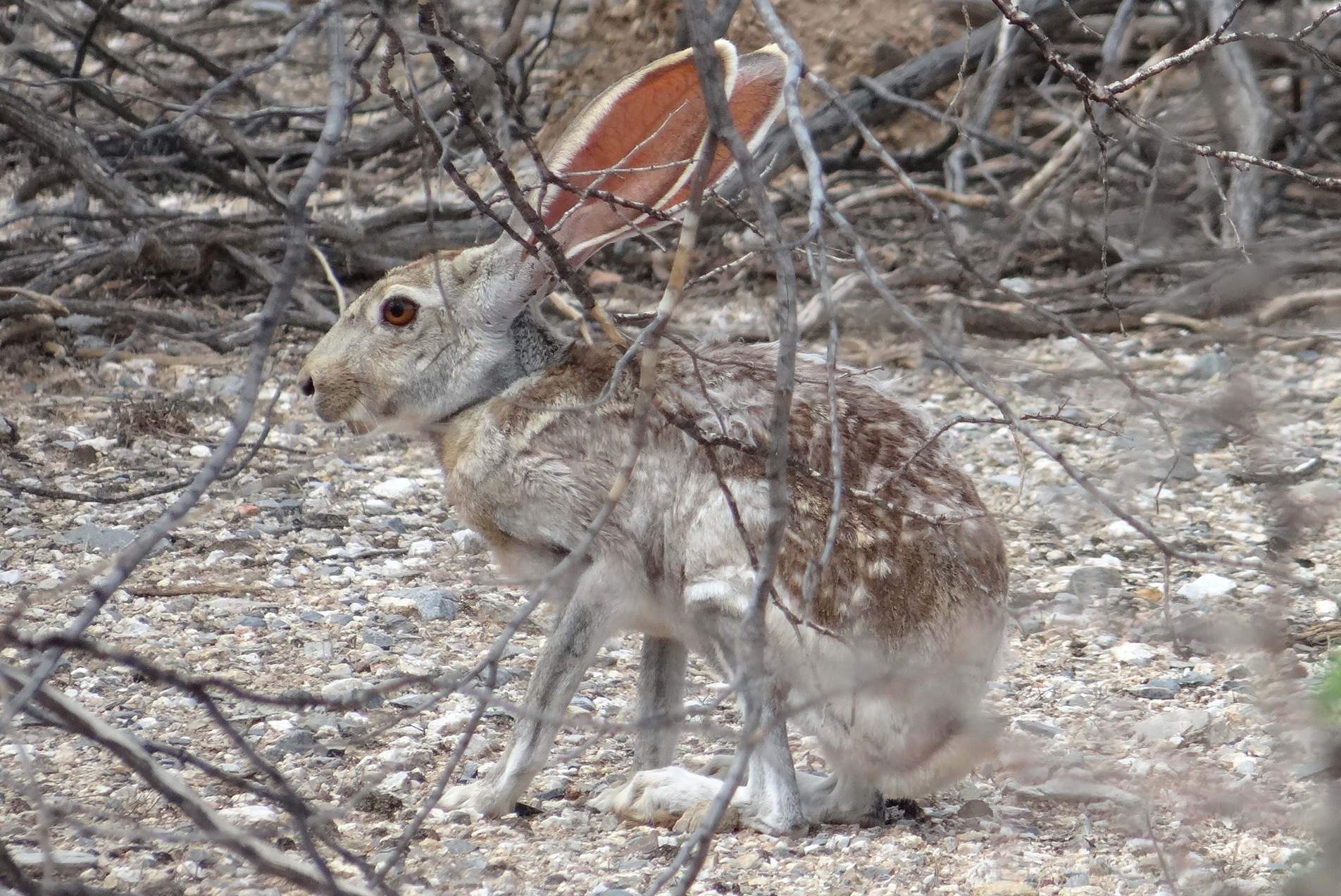
Lepus alleni in Saguaro National Park

It is most active during twilight (crepuscular) and during the night (nocturnal), but can be active during the day when conditions are favorable (heavy cloud coverage).

=== Diet ===
The antelope jackrabbit feeds on cacti, grasses, mesquite leaves and other leafy vegetation. This species has been observed digging and eating soil in an attempt to intake minerals and other nutrients. They can be classified as folivores and graminivores.

=== Reproduction ===
Antelope jackrabbits breed from December to September and the gestation period is roughly six weeks long. Females have up to four litters per year ranging from one to five individuals. A baby hare, called a leveret, is born precocial; its eyes are open, it is active, and it is covered with fur. Young are born in shallow dirt nests that are formed by scraping the surface of the ground. The leverets reach sexual maturity at roughly 6 months of age.

== Threats and conservation ==
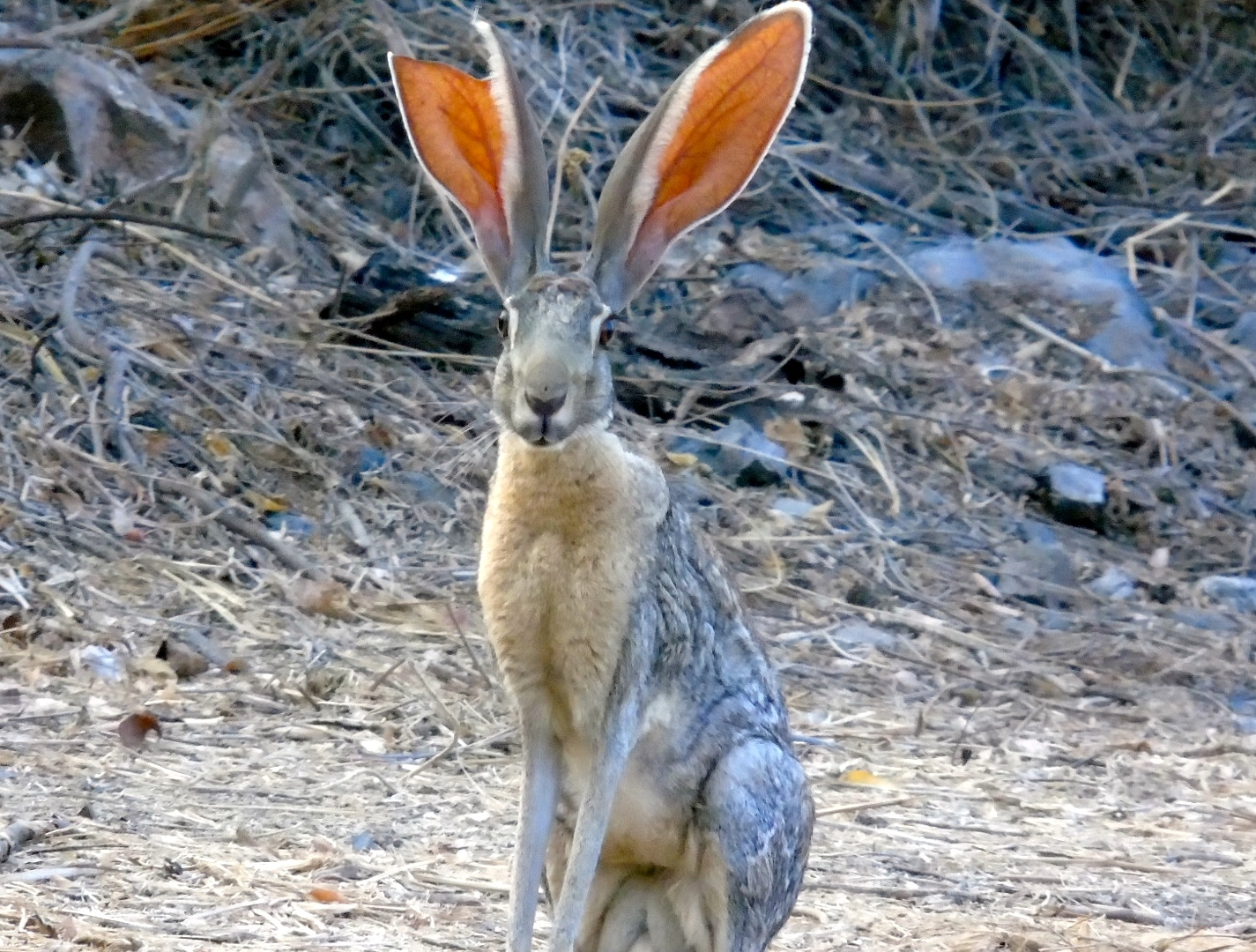
An antelope jackrabbit in Mazatlán with a damaged ear

Known predators of the antelope jackrabbit include bobcats, coyotes, and golden eagles. Since antelope jackrabbits attract predators that are also a threat to livestock, they are hunted by humans to reduce potential problems. This species is also hunted for human consumption or for their valuable pelt. The jackrabbits themselves were once so abundant as to be considered an agricultural pest on their own, but a 2018 account remarks that this has since become a rare occurrence. Live jackrabbits were historically used to train racing greyhounds. Habitat loss also poses a threat to antelope jackrabbits, as agricultural expansion is interfering with their habitats. Grazing livestock reduce the abundance of grasses and herbaceous plants in areas where antelope jackrabbits reside. As they naturally avoid wide open spaces, the expansion of croplands and pastures has the potential to eliminate populations of antelope jackrabbits. Disease, vehicle collisions, cold weather and predators all pose direct threats to the species.

Antelope jackrabbits have few legal protections, being classified only as "wildlife" in both Arizona and Mexico. However, the subspecies L. a. tiburonensis has a particularly small population, estimated at only 4,300 individuals across a habitable area of 1,208 square kilometers (466 sq mi), and is isolated on the protected area of Tiburón Island. This subspecies is continually monitored and protected by the Mexican government. On a whole, the antelope jackrabbit is classified by the International Union for Conservation of Nature as a least-concern species. Research on the jackrabbit's population dynamics and the relationships between it and the black-tailed jackrabbit has been recommended.

== See also ==
- Jackalope - a fictional cross between an antelope and a jackrabbit
