= World Academy of Science, Engineering and Technology =

Predatory publisher of academic journals

- Status: Active
- Founder: Cemal Ardil
- Country of origin: Turkey
- Distribution: Worldwide
- Publication types: Open access journals
- Nonfiction topics: Science, technology, and medicine
- Official website: www.waset.org

The World Academy of Science, Engineering and Technology or WASET is a predatory publisher of open access academic journals. The publisher has been listed as a "potential, possible, or probable" predatory publisher by American library scientist Jeffrey Beall and is listed as such by the Max Planck Society. WASET's estimated annual revenue in 2017 alone was over $4 million, with other estimates ranging from $8.9 million to $11.9 million for the years 2014 to 2019 combined.

== Conferences ==
WASET has been accused of arranging predatory conferences, in order to artificially boost the academic credentials of presenters and paper submitters. It claims to organize several thousands of scientific conferences a year, using names that are the same or similar to real conferences organized by established scientific groups. WASET also appears to operate the website "Conference Index", which claims to be a database of international conferences but only lists events from WASET.

Legitimate conferences have publicly warned of identically named, fake WASET conferences. In 2015, the University of Toronto released a "scam advisory" about a purported conference on their premises advertised by WASET. In 2018 WASET advertised 49,844 conferences, many of which share similar names. Hundreds of conferences may be scheduled for the same location on the same day. For example, 116 simultaneous scientific meetings were scheduled in a hotel in Rio de Janeiro in February 2016.

The conferences are low-quality, described in one case as a "Potemkin village" and anyone can present a paper by simply paying the registration fee. Conferences are planned many years in advance. The website includes a section on "Featured Locations" featuring photos of popular tourist destinations. Names of researchers have been included as conference committee members, without their knowledge or consent.

== Organization ==
WASET is based in Turkey and is registered in Azerbaijan. Its domain name was registered 2007 with a contact address in Dubai. It is run by Cemal Ardil, a former science teacher, with assistance from his daughter Ebru and his son Bora. Cemal Ardil is also the person who has published the most articles on the WASET website. Before taking on the name WASET, the organization was known under the name of "Enformatika".

== Journal indexing ==
Journals are indexed in WASET's "International Science Index", not to be confused with the Institute for Scientific Information (ISI) index, i.e. the Web of Science. WASET journals were indexed by Scopus and listed in the SCImago Journal Rank from 2009 until 2011, when the coverage was cancelled. They were furthermore included in Qualis, an official Brazilian system for classifying scientific literature, which guides researchers in choosing journals for publication. This inclusion was called a "serious failure" by scientists interviewed by Folha de S.Paulo, a Brazilian daily newspaper.

== Media attention ==
In 2013 one of WASET's journals, the International Journal of Medical, Pharmaceutical, Biological, and Life Sciences, accepted an obviously fake article in a sting operation by John Bohannon. The resulting article and data were published in Science.

In mid-July 2018, a research team of journalists including Süddeutsche Zeitung, ARD, ORF, BR, Falter and Le Monde published articles on unscientific and predatory publishers, including WASET and OMICS. The group of journalists presented their findings at the 2018 DEF CON 26 conference in a talk entitled "Inside the Fake Science Factory". They detail how a WASET conference works, show how they gave a presentation on a ludicrous paper (generated using SCIgen) to the gathered academics, and how they confronted the single person organizing the conference. The journalists state that their "findings highlight the prevalence of the pseudo-academic conferences, journals and publications and the damage they can and are doing to society".
