= Scientific Research Publishing =

Chinese fraudulent academic publisher

- Status: Active
- Founded: 2007
- Founder: Huaibei Zhou
- Headquarters location: Wuhan, China
- Distribution: Worldwide
- Key people: Huaibei Zhou
- Publication types: Academic journals and books
- Nonfiction topics: Life sciences, economics, chemistry, computer science, environmental sciences, engineering, medicine, physics, mathematics, social sciences
- Owners: Wuhan Erwan Culture Communication Co., Ltd.; Wuhan Grand Technology Service Co., Ltd.
- No. of employees: About 160
- Official website: www.scirp.org

The Scientific Research Publishing (SCIRP) is a predatory academic publisher of open-access electronic journals, conference proceedings, and scientific anthologies that are of questionable quality. As of December 2014, it offered 244 English-language open-access journals in the areas of science, technology, business, economy, and medicine.

The company has been accused of using email spam to solicit papers for submission. Although it has an address in southern California, according to Jeffrey Beall it is a Chinese operation. In 2014 there was a mass resignation of the editorial board of one of the company's journals, Advances in Anthropology, with the outgoing editor-in-chief saying of the publisher "For them it was only about making money. We were simply their 'front'."

== Open access type ==
According to its website, SCIRP publishes fee-based open-access journals (Gold OA). Payments are incurred per article published. Authors are permitted to archive their work (Green OA). Preprint, postprint, and the publisher's PDF version may be used. According to the society's website, journals published are fully open access, with reuse rights based on CC BY or CC BY-NC.

== Academic integrity ==
SCIRP generated controversy in 2010 when it was found that its journals duplicated papers which had already been published elsewhere, without notification of or permission from the original author and of the copyright holder. Several of these publications have subsequently been retracted. Some of the journals had listed academics on their editorial boards without their permission or even knowledge, sometimes in fields very different from their own. In 2012, one of its journals, Advances in Pure Mathematics, accepted a paper written by a parody generator; the paper was not published, but only due to its author's unwillingness to pay the publication fee. The company has also been noted for the many unsolicited bulk emails it sends to academics about its journals.

In 2013, the Open Journal of Pediatrics, a SCIRP journal, published a study which concluded that the number of babies born with thyroid problems in the western United States increased by 16 percent in 2011 compared to 2010, after the Fukushima Daiichi nuclear disaster. The study has been criticized for not taking into account the fact that 2010 was a year with an unusually low number of births with thyroid problems. SCIRP refused to print a letter criticizing the study, but offered to publish it as an article for a charge.

The company has been included in a list of questionable open access publishers, according to Jeffrey Beall's criteria. Beall states that "This publisher exists for two reasons. First, it exists to exploit the author-pays Open Access model to generate revenue, and second, it serves as an easy place for foreign (chiefly Chinese) authors to publish overseas and increase their academic status." He acknowledges that its fees are relatively low, describing this as "a strategy that increases article submissions," and that "it has attracted some quality article submissions. Nevertheless, it is really a vanity press."

Further controversy was generated by a mass resignation of the editorial board of one of the company's journals, Advances in Anthropology, in 2013. According to the former editor-in-chief, Fatimah Jackson, it was motivated by failures to include the editorial board in the journal's review process, and by "consistent and flagrant unethical breaches by the editorial staff in China", for whom publishing the journal "was only about making money." According to Beall, this was the first mass resignation from an open-access journal.

In 2021 Cabells' Predatory Reports described SCIRP as a "well-known predatory publisher". In the Norwegian Scientific Index, the publisher and all of its journals have a rating of 0 (non-academic). An academic study published in 2022 stated that SCIRP was "widely known to host 'fake journals'".

== Ownership ==
The SCIRP website is operated by Wuhan Erwan Culture Communication Co., Ltd. Wuhan Erwan Culture Communication Co., Ltd is primarily owned by Wuhan Grand Technology Service Co., Ltd. Engineering Information Institute, a member or source content provider of SCIRP, is also owned by Wuhan Erwan Culture Communication Co., Ltd.

== See also ==
- Academic publishing in China
- Directory of Open Access Journals
- Peer review
- Predatory conference
