= Jacobs Publishers =

Academic publisher

Jacobs Publishers is a publisher of various international journals based in Hyderabad, India. Jacobs Publishers has been included on Beall's List of predatory open-access publishers and has faced other criticisms of its publishing practices.

== Activities ==
Jacobs Publishers LLC was created in 2013. The company uses an Open Access model of publishing, which charges the authors. Articles are distributed online and free of cost or other barriers. The company claims that articles are peer reviewed before publication.

In 2018 the company published about 75 journals in the fields of clinical and medical science, life sciences, chemistry, engineering, and pharmacy.

== Criticism ==
Jacobs Publishers was listed on Beall's List of potential, possible, or probable predatory scholarly open-access publishers. The company has been criticized for sending out email spam to scientists, calling out for papers, and for having provided infrastructure for other publishers who send out email spam. It has further been criticized for giving incoherent advice to journal authors, for unqualified journal editors, and that their editors are also active for predatory publishers like OMICS Publishing Group.
