= Plastic Surgery (journal) =

- Discipline: Plastic surgery
- Language: English, French
- Edited by: Jugpal S. Arneja

Publication details
- History: 1993–present
- Publisher: SAGE Publications
- Frequency: Quarterly
- Impact factor: 0.947 (2020)

Standard abbreviations
- ISO 4: Plast. Surg.

Indexing
- ISSN: 2292-5503 (print); 2292-5511 (web)
- OCLC no.: 913328703

Links
- Journal homepage; Online access; Online archive

Plastic Surgery (formerly Canadian Journal of Plastic Surgery) is a peer-reviewed medical journal dealing with plastic surgery. It is the official journal of several national Canadian societies: the Canadian Society of Plastic Surgeons, the Canadian Society for Aesthetic (Cosmetic) Plastic Surgery, the Groupe pour l'Avancement de la Microchirurgie Canada, and the Canadian Society for Surgery of the Hand (Manus Canada). The journal covers both research and material dealing with continuing medical education and society guidelines. It was published by the Pulsus Group, which was placed on Jeffrey Beall's list of "Potential, possible, or probable" predatory open-access publishers following its sale to OMICS Publishing Group. The journal subsequently switched publishers and is now published by SAGE Publications.

== Abstracting and indexing ==
The journal is abstracted and indexed in EBSCO databases and the Science Citation Index Expanded. According to the Journal Citation Reports, the journal has a 2020 impact factor of 0.947.
