= Cambridge Scholars Publishing =

British publisher

- Status: Active
- Founded: 2001; 25 years ago
- Country of origin: United Kingdom
- Headquarters location: Newcastle upon Tyne, England
- Nonfiction topics: Science, technology, medicine, business, transport and architecture
- Owner: Graeme Nicol
- Official website: cambridgescholars.com

Cambridge Scholars Publishing (CSP) is an academic book publisher based in Newcastle upon Tyne, England. It is not affiliated with the University of Cambridge or Cambridge University Press.

It began as the hobby project of a Cambridge alumnus publishing out-of-print Victorian novels. Since then, it has expanded into health science, life science, physical science, and social science. In 2018 it published 729 books. It is known for its aggressive solicitation of authors via email, and uses print on demand technology to publish a large number of titles every year under a low margin business model, with limited editorial oversight of published works. Although Cambridge Scholars does not charge its authors, it has been listed as a predatory publisher by Cabells' Predatory Reports.

== Business model ==
Cambridge Scholars Publishing aggressively solicits academic authors via email using information found online, such as recently graduated PhD students with offers to publish their theses, or participants in academic conferences, as well as research that would be rejected by other academic publishers for being "not mainstream enough". The vast majority (85%) of the publications are in the social sciences, mostly by authors affiliated with European universities. CSP has a high volume low margin business model, with over 800 new book titles being published by the company each year as of 2023, with only a handful of works selling significant amounts, with the vast majority selling less than "a few hundred copies". The books are typically sold via EBSCO as well as online sites like Amazon, Blackwell's, and Gardners. Most books are sold in hardback for approximately £80 as of 2023, with some titles that have "broader sales potential" later being sold in softback for a cheaper price around £45 as of 2023. CSP reportedly has an 80% acceptance rate for published works. Books can be published within 3 months of submission, and peer review is generally done by an in-house team, but typically "there isn’t a full manuscript review." and CSP expects a print-ready manuscript to be prepared by the author, with no internal copyediting. A 5% royalty rate is paid to authors for the sale of every book, and less than 50 books need to be sold for a title to be profitable for the company.

== Journal publishing ==
The company previously published academic journals including the discontinued titles Zambia Social Sciences Journal and Review Journal of Political Philosophy. However, as of 2020, Cambridge Scholars did not publish any journals/periodicals.

== Reception ==
In 2017, David H. Kaye's Flaky Academic Journals noted that "the journals do not look stellar. No editorial boards are listed", but journals are no longer published, and as of 2020, an editorial board of international scholars is now listed. Cambridge Scholars made an official statement on the site in December 2018 entitled 'In Defense of Cambridge Scholars' in which John Peters, an advisor to Cambridge Scholars Publishing, commented on the statements made on the site stating "There are no charges to publish. There is no requirement on authors for a buy-back in return for publication. Royalties are accrued to the author from the first sale of a title. Decisions to publish are not taken on likely sales or profitability (which is unusual in a commercial publisher). The commercial risk to publish rests entirely with CSP."

In February 2018, it was added as a potentially predatory journal publisher to an unofficial continuation of Beall's List of potentially predatory journals or publishers, no longer maintained by Beall but by an anonymous European postdoctoral researcher. As of September 2023 the most recent changes shown on the list were in December 2021. As of November 2023 a list published by Predatory Reports, "an organization made up of volunteer researchers who have been harmed by predatory publishers and want to help researchers identify trusted journals and publishers for their research", lists Cambridge Scholars in its list of Predatory Publishers and discusses it at length in a July 2023 news post which concludes that "Some studies name CSP as potentially predatory."

== History ==
The company was founded in 2001 by former Cambridge University academics. It relocated to Newcastle when its founders moved to Durham University, and was subsequently sold to a group of Newcastle-based business-people when the original owner left the UK in 2010. The company is now co-owned and managed by Graeme Nicol who bought the company from the original owner in 2011.

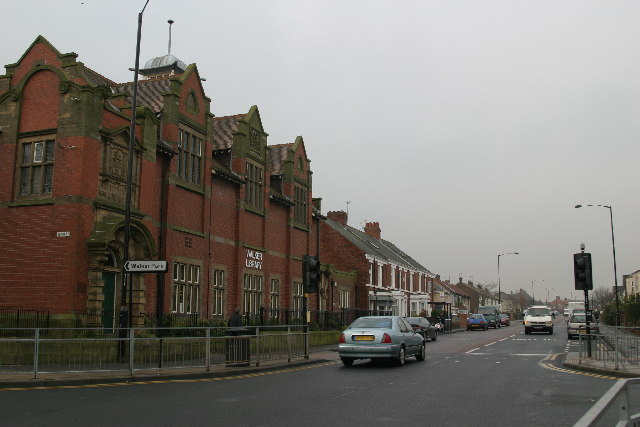
The Lady Stephenson Library, then known as Walker Library, in 2006

== Premises ==
The firm is based in the Lady Stephenson Library, a building that was commissioned in 1908 to house one of Newcastle's early public libraries, given to the city by William Haswell Stephenson and named for his wife Eliza Mary née Bond, who had died aged 67 in 1901. The building is now the location of four registered companies.
