= JSciMed Central =

JSci Med Central is a publisher of various academic journals from Hyderabad, India. JSciMed Central has been included on Beall's List of potential predatory open-access publishers, and has faced other criticisms of its publishing practices.

== Activities ==
JSciMed Central was incorporated in Hyderabad in 2013. The company uses an Open Access model of publishing, which charges the authors. Articles are distributed online and free of cost or other barriers. The company claims that articles are peer-reviewed before publication. In November 2022 the company published about 144 journals in the fields of Medical, Clinical, Chemical, Engineering, Pharmacy, and Life Sciences. As of 2022, most or all of its journals do not have a scientific editor in chief. JSciMed Central' journals are not listed in Clarivate's Web of Science, and not indexed in National Library of Medicine's MEDLINE.

== Criticism ==
JSciMed Central was listed in Beall's List of potential predatory open-access publishers. The company has been criticized for sending out email spam to scientists, calling out for papers, and to publish journals that have not achieved indexing in any recognized service, and were therefore considered as potential or probable predatory open-access journals.

== Journals ==
The following journals are listed at the JSciMed Central website:

- Annals of Aquaculture and Research
- Annals of Biometrics and Biostatistics
- Annals of Breast Cancer Research
- Annals of Cardiovascular Diseases
- Annals of Clinical and Experimental Hypertension
- Annals of Clinical and Experimental Metabolism
- Annals of Clinical and Medical Microbiology
- Annals of Clinical Cytology and Pathology
- Annals of Clinical Pathology
- Annals of Community Medicine and Practice
- Annals of Emergency Surgery
- Annals of Food Processing and Preservation
- Annals of Forensic Research and Analysis
- Annals of Gerontology and Geriatric Research
- Annals of Marine Biology and Research
- Annals of Medicinal Chemistry and Research
- Annals of Mens Health and Wellness
- Annals of Musculoskeletal Disorders
- Annals of Neurodegenerative Disorders
- Annals of Nursing and Practice
- Annals of Orthopedics and Rheumatology
- Annals of Pediatrics and Child Health
- Annals of Pregnancy and Care
- Annals of Psychiatry and Mental Health
- Annals of Public Health and Research
- Annals of Reproductive Medicine and Treatment
- Annals of Sports Medicine and Research
- Annals of Vaccines and Immunization
- Annals of Vascular Medicine and Research
- Annals of Virology and Research
- Annals of Otolaryngology and Rhinology
- Archives of Emergency Medicine and Critical Care
- Archives of Paediatric & Developmental Pathology
- Archives of Palliative Care
- Archives of Stem Cell and Research
- Chemical Engineering and Process Techniques
- Clinical Journal of Heart Diseases
- Clinical Research in HIV or AIDS
- Clinical Research in Infectious Diseases
- Clinical Research in Pulmonology
- International Journal of Clinical Anesthesiology
- International Journal of Plant Biology & Research
- International Journal of Rare Diseases and Orphan Drugs
- Journal of Addiction Medicine and Therapy
- Journal of Aging and Age Related Diseases
- Journal of Autism and Epilepsy
- Journal of Autoimmunity and Research
- Journal of Behavior
- Journal of Cancer Biology and Research
- Journal of Cardiology and Clinical Research
- Journal of Chronic Diseases and Management
- Journal of Clinical Nephrology and Research
- Journal of Collaborative Healthcare and Translational Medicine
- Journal of Drug Design and Research
- Journal of Ear, Nose and Throat Disorders
- Journal of Embryology and Developmental Biology
- Journal of Endocrinology, Diabetes and Obesity
- Journal of Family Medicine and Community Health
- Journal of Fever
- Journal of Fractures and Sprains
- Journal of Genitourinary Disorders
- Journal of Hematology and Transfusion
- Journal of Human Nutrition and Food Science
- Journal of Immunology and Clinical Research
- Journal of Information Technology and Communications
- Journal of Liver and Clinical Research
- Journal of Materials and Applied Science
- Journal of Memory Disorder and Rehabilitation
- Journal of Muscle Health
- Journal of Nausea
- Journal of Neurological Disorders and Stroke
- Journal of Neurology and Translational Neuroscience
- Journal of Pharmacology and Clinical Toxicology
- Journal of Preventive Medicine and Health Care
- Journal of Radiology and Radiation Therapy
- Journal of Sleep Medicine and Disorders
- Journal of Substance Abuse and Alcoholism
- Journal of Surgery and Transplantation Science
- Journal of Trauma and Care
- Journal of Urology and Research
- Journal of Veterinary Medicine and Research
- Journal of Dermatology and Clinical Research
- JSM Allergy and Asthma
- JSM Alzheimer's Disease and Related Dementia
- JSM Anatomy and Physiology
- JSM Anxiety and Depression
- JSM Arthritis
- JSM Atherosclerosis
- JSM Bioavailability and Bioequivalence
- JSM Biochemistry and Molecular Biology
- JSM Bioinformatics, Genomics and Proteomics
- JSM Biology
- JSM Biomarkers
- JSM Biotechnology and Biomedical Engineering
- JSM Bone and Joint Diseases
- JSM Bone Marrow Research
- JSM Brain Science
- JSM Burns and Trauma
- JSM Cardiothoracic Surgery
- JSM Cell and Developmental Biology
- JSM Chemistry
- JSM Clinical and Medical Imaging Cases and Reviews
- JSM Clinical Case Reports
- JSM Clinical Oncology and Research
- JSM Clinical Pharmaceutics
- JSM Communication Disorders
- JSM Computer Science and Engineering
- JSM Dental Surgery
- JSM Dentistry
- JSM Diabetology and Management
- JSM Environmental Science and Ecology
- JSM Enzymology and Protein Science
- JSM Foot and Ankle
- JSM Gastroenterology and Hepatology
- JSM General Surgery Cases and Images
- JSM Genetics and Genomics
- JSM Head and Face Medicine
- JSM Head and Neck Cancer-Cases and Reviews
- JSM Health Education & Primary Health Care
- JSM Heart Surgery Cases and Images
- JSM Hepatitis
- JSM Internal Medicine
- JSM Invitro Fertilization
- JSM Mathematics and Statistics
- JSM Medical Case Reports
- JSM Microbiology
- JSM Nanotechnology and Nanomedicine
- JSM Neurosurgery and Spine
- JSM Nutritional Disorders
- JSM Ophthalmology
- JSM Oro Facial Surgeries
- JSM Pain and Management
- JSM Pediatric Neurology
- JSM Pediatric Surgery
- JSM Physical Medicine and Rehabilitation
- JSM Regenerative Medicine and Bioengineering
- JSM Renal Medicine
- JSM Schizophrenia
- JSM Sexual Medicine
- JSM Spectroscopy and Chromatography
- JSM Spine
- JSM Surgical Oncology and Research
- JSM Surgical Procedures
- JSM Thyroid Disorders and Management
- JSM Tropical Medicine and Research
- JSM Women's Health
- Medical Journal of Obstetrics and Gynecology
