= Advanced Science Letters =

- Discipline: Multidisciplinary
- Language: English
- Edited by: Ahmad Umar

Publication details
- History: 2008-2019
- Publisher: American Scientific Publishers
- Frequency: Monthly

Standard abbreviations
- ISO 4: Adv. Sci. Lett.

Indexing
- CODEN: ASLDAM
- ISSN: 1936-6612 (print); 1936-7317 (web)
- LCCN: 2007213034
- OCLC no.: 226060132

Links
- Journal homepage

Advanced Science Letters was a peer-reviewed scientific journal published by American Scientific Publishers. The editor-in-chief was Hari Singh Nalwa. Publishing formats include full papers, short communications, and special sections consisting of various formats. The journal was established in June 2008, and is published by American Scientific Publishers, a company identified by Jeffrey Beall as a predatory publisher. Although the journal received a 2010 impact factor of 1.253, it ceased to be indexed the following year. The journal was discontinued in 2019.

== Scope ==
Coverage included joining basic and applied original research across multiple disciplines. These are the physical sciences, biological sciences (including health sciences and medicine), computer sciences (including information science), agriculture sciences, geosciences, and environmental sciences (including environmental engineering). Education and public relations were also covered.
