= Herald Scholarly Open Access =

Herald Scholarly Open Access is an Indian publisher of various academic journals. Herald Scholarly Open Access has been included on Beall's List of potential predatory open-access publishers, and has faced other criticisms of its publishing practices.

== Activities ==
Herald Scholarly Open Access has been active at least since 2015. The company uses an Open Access model of publishing, which charges the authors. Articles are distributed online and free of cost or other barriers. The company claims that articles are peer reviewed before publication. As of 2018, the company was publishing 74 journals in the fields of clinical and medical science, life sciences, and pharma. Its journals are not indexed in Medline, Scopus or Web of Science.

== Criticism ==
Herald Scholarly Open Access was listed in Beall's List of potential predatory open-access publishers. In an analysis of predatory publishing blacklists and whitelists, Michaela Strinzel, Anna Severin, Katrin Milzow and Matthias Egger note that Herald appears both on Beall's List and the Directory of Open Access Journals.

The company has been criticized for sending out email spam to scientists, calling out for papers, and for choosing journal titles mimicking the titles of established, indexed journals.

== Journals ==
- Advances in Industrial Biotechnology
- Advances in Microbiology Research
- Archives of Surgery and Surgical Education
- Archives of Urology
- Archives of Zoological Studies
- Current Trends Medical and Biological Engineering
- International Journal of Case Reports and Therapeutic Studies
- Journal of Addiction & Addictive Disorders
- Journal of Agronomy & Agricultural Science
- Journal of AIDS Clinical Research & STDs
- Journal of Alcoholism Drug Abuse & Substance Dependence
- Journal of Allergy Disorders & Therapy
- Journal of Alternative Complementary & Integrative Medicine
- Journal of Alzheimers & Neurodegenerative Diseases
- Journal of Anesthesia & Clinical Care
- Journal of Angiology & Vascular Surgery
- Journal of Animal Research & Veterinary Science
- Journal of Aquaculture & Fisheries
- Journal of Atmospheric & Earth Sciences
- Journal of Biotech Research & Biochemistry
- Journal of Brain & Neuroscience Research
- Journal of Cancer Biology & Treatment
- Journal of Cardiology Study & Research
- Journal of Cell Biology & Cell Metabolism
- Journal of Clinical Dermatology & Therapy
- Journal of Clinical Immunology & Immunotherapy
- Journal of Clinical Studies & Medical Case Reports
- Journal of Community Medicine & Public Health Care
- Journal of Cytology & Tissue Biology
- Journal of Dairy Research & Technology
- Journal of Dentistry Oral Health & Cosmesis
- Journal of Diabetes & Metabolic Disorders
- Journal of Emergency Medicine Trauma & Surgical Care
- Journal of Environmental Science Current Research
- Journal of Food Science & Nutrition
- Journal of Forensic Legal & Investigative Sciences
- Journal of Gastroenterology & Hepatology Research
- Journal of Genetics & Genomic Sciences
- Journal of Gerontology & Geriatric Medicine
- Journal of Hematology Blood Transfusion & Disorders
- Journal of Hospice & Palliative Medical Care
- Journal of Human Endocrinology
- Journal of Infectious & Non Infectious Diseases
- Journal of Internal Medicine & Primary Healthcare
- Journal of Light & Laser Current Trends
- Journal of Medicine Study & Research
- Journal of Modern Chemical Sciences
- Journal of Nanotechnology Nanomedicine & Nanobiotechnology
- Journal of Neonatology & Clinical Pediatrics
- Journal of Nephrology & Renal Therapy
- Journal of Non Invasive Vascular Investigation
- Journal of Nuclear Medicine Radiology & Radiation Therapy
- Journal of Obesity & Weight Loss
- Journal of Ophthalmology & Clinical Research
- Journal of Orthopedic Research & Physiotherapy
- Journal of Otolaryngology Head & Neck Surgery
- Journal of Pathology Clinical & Medical Research
- Journal of Pharmacology Pharmaceutics & Pharmacovigilance
- Journal of Physical Medicine Rehabilitation & Disabilities
- Journal of Plant Science Current Research
- Journal of Practical & Professional Nursing
- Journal of Protein Research & Bioinformatics
- Journal of Psychiatry Depression & Anxiety
- Journal of Pulmonary Medicine & Respiratory Research
- Journal of Reproductive Medicine Gynaecology & Obstetrics
- Journal of Stem Cells Research Development & Therapy
- Journal of Surgery Current Trends & Innovations
- Journal of Toxicology Current Research
- Journal of Translational Science and Research
- Journal of Vaccines Research & Vaccination
- Journal of Virology & Antivirals
- Sports Medicine and Injury Care * Journal
- Trends in Anatomy & Physiology
