= SciRes Literature =

India-based academic journal publisher

SciRes Literature LLC is a publisher of academic journals. It has a postal address in Middletown, Delaware, US, but is actually based in Hyderabad, India. It started its activities in 2015. The company uses an Open Access model of publishing, which charges the authors. Articles are distributed online and free of cost or other barriers. As of October 2022, none of its journals names a scientific editor-in-chief.

== Criticism ==
SciRes Literature was criticized for sending unsolicited emails to scientists. Its Journal of Biomedical Research & Environmental Sciences was criticized for presenting a misleading impact factor, as the impact factor reported is not identical with the highly regarded ISI impact factor from Web of Science. SciRes Literature has also been criticized for using journal titles which mimic the names of established, indexed scientific journals. The company has been included on Beall's List of potential predatory open-access publishers.

== Journals ==
- Advanced Journal of Physics Research and Applications
- Advanced Journal of Toxicology: Current Research
- Advanced Journal of Vascular Medicine
- Alzheimers & Parkinsons Disease: Open Access
- American Journal of Anesthesia & Clinical Research
- American Journal of Biometrics & Biostatistics
- American Journal of Clinical Anatomy & Physiology
- American Journal of Current & Applied Research in Microbiology
- American Journal of Emergency & Critical Care Medicine
- American Journal of Epidemiology & Public Health
- American Journal of Materials & Applied Science
- American Journal of Nanotechnology & Nanomedicine
- American Journal of Pharmacology & Therapeutics
- American Journal of Rare Disorders: Diagnosis & Therapy
- American Journal of Urology Research
- International Journal of Bioanalysis & Biomedicine
- International Journal of Blood Disorders & Diseases
- International Journal of Cancer & Cellular Biology Research
- International Journal of Cardiovascular Diseases & Diagnosis
- International Journal of Case Reports & Short Reviews
- International Journal of Clinical Cardiology & Research
- International Journal of Clinical Endocrinology
- International Journal of Gerontology & Geriatric Research
- International Journal of Hepatology & Gastroenterology
- International Journal of Nephrology & Therapeutics
- International Journal of Neurological Disorders
- International Journal of Nutritional Disorders & Therapy
- International Journal of Ophthalmology & Vision Research
- International Journal of Orthopedics: Research & Therapy
- International Journal of Pain & Relief
- International Journal of Pharmaceutica Analytica Acta
- International Journal of Primatology & Research
- International Journal of Proteomics & Bioinformatics
- International Journal of Reproductive Medicine & Gynecology
- International Journal of Research on Internal Medicine
- International Journal of Rhinology & Otolaryngology
- International Journal of Sleep Disorders
- International Journal of Sports Science & Medicine
- International Journal of Stem Cells & Research
- International Journal of Veterinary Science & Technology
- International Journal of Virology & Infectious Diseases
- Journal of Research in Diabetes & Metabolism
- Open Journal of Biotechnology & Bioengineering Research
- Open Journal of Pediatrics & Neonatal Care^
- Open Journal of Surgery
- Scientific Journal of Biology
- Scientific Journal of Biomedical Engineering & Biomedical Science
- Scientific Journal of Clinical Research in Dermatology
- Scientific Journal of Depression & Anxiety
- Scientific Journal of Food Science & Nutrition
- Scientific Journal of Immunology & Immunotherapy
- Scientific Journal of Musculoskeletal Disorders
- Scientific Journal of Neurology & Neurosurgery
- Scientific Journal of Nuclear Medicine & Radiation Therapy
- Scientific Journal of Nursing & Practice
- Scientific Journal of Pulmonary & Respiratory Medicine
- Scientific Journal of Research in Dentistry
- Scientific Journal of Womens Health & Care
