= Journal of Biological Sciences =

- Discipline: Biology
- Language: English
- Edited by: Mehmet Ozaslan

Publication details
- History: 2001–present
- Publisher: Science Alert on behalf of the Asian Network for Scientific Information
- Frequency: 8/year
- Open access: Yes
- License: Creative Commons Attribution

Standard abbreviations
- ISO 4: J. Biol. Sci.

Indexing
- CODEN: JBSFA9
- ISSN: 1727-3048 (print); 1812-5719 (web)
- OCLC no.: 232116549

Links
- Journal homepage; Online access; Online archive

The Journal of Biological Sciences is a peer-reviewed open-access scientific journal covering research relating to general biology, biochemistry, genetics, and biotechnology. It was established in 2001 and is published by Science Alert on behalf of the Asian Network for Scientific Information. The publisher Science Alert has been designated as predatory by Jeffrey Beall. The editor-in-chief is Mehmet Ozaslan (Gaziantep University).

== Abstracting and indexing ==
The journal is abstracted and indexed in Chemical Abstracts Service and in Scopus from 2006 until it was dropped in 2018.
