= Srinubabu Gedela =

Indian businessman and politician

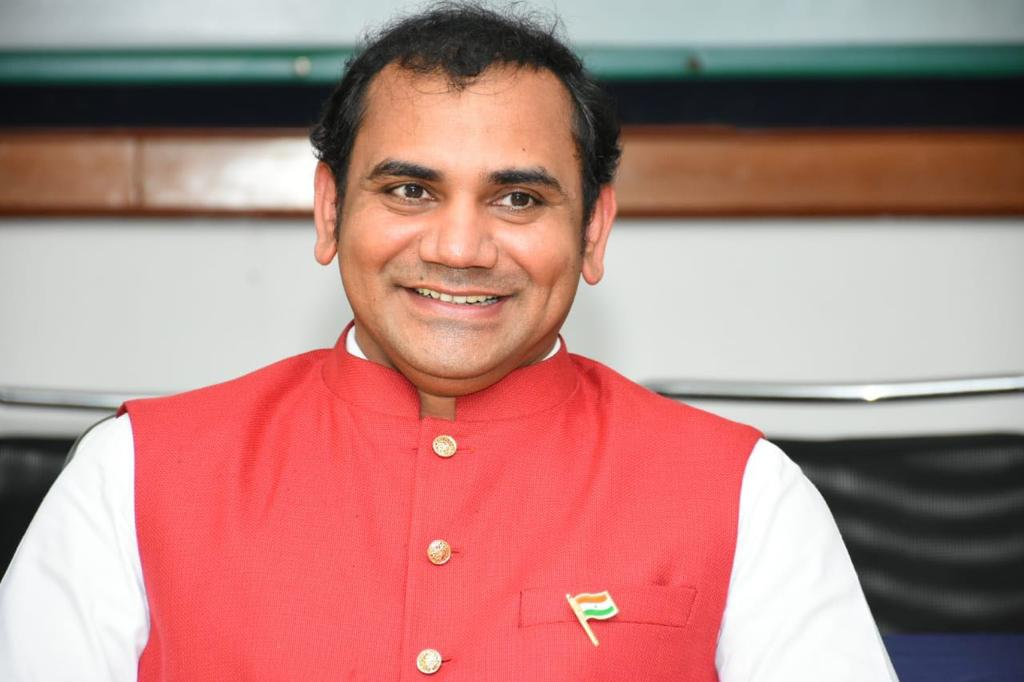
- Srinubabu Gedela in 2019, Indian delegation to Europe
- Born: June 1982; 44 years ago Allena, Srikakulam, India
- Education: B.Pharma, MTech, PhD at Andhra University, postdoctoral fellowship at Stanford University
- Occupations: Scientist, industrialist
- Employer(s): CEO, Pulsus Group
- Title: Vice-President of Federation of Asian Biotech Association (FABA) and trade delegation of India to the European Union
- Website: www.srinubabu.com

Srinubabu Gedela is an Indian businessman, scientist and politician. He is the chief executive officer of Pulsus Group and founder of its parent company the OMICS Publishing Group, a scientific journal publishing company that publishes science findings online for free for readers widely criticized for its predatory publishing.

Gedela was the co-convenor of the Health, Pharma, and Tech Summit Series, executed across the G20 countries to promote AI in healthcare and technology advancements. He is also an executive council member of Dr. B. R. Ambedkar University, Srikakulam.

OMICS' journals and conferences have been characterized as predatory publishing journals and predatory conferences with poor quality controls and a lack of legitimate services. As a result of this business model, Gedela's journals have been banned from indexing within the National Institutes of Health's PubMed Central. Additionally, in 2019, his company OMICS Publishing Group was required to pay 50.1 million dollars in damages following a US Federal Trade Commission complaint that the company was deceiving researchers and academicians.

== Career ==
=== Research ===
Gedela completed his PhD from Andhra University and a postdoctoral fellowship at Stanford University. In 2007, he received the Young Scientist Award from the Human Proteome Organization in Seoul, South Korea.

He has published research articles on how to study biological phenomena using mathematical models and how to detect cancer or diabetes early. He has published about 30 articles in various peer-reviewed journals. According to Google Scholar, Gedela's articles have been cited about 580 times, giving him an h-index of 13.

=== FABA Vice-President ===
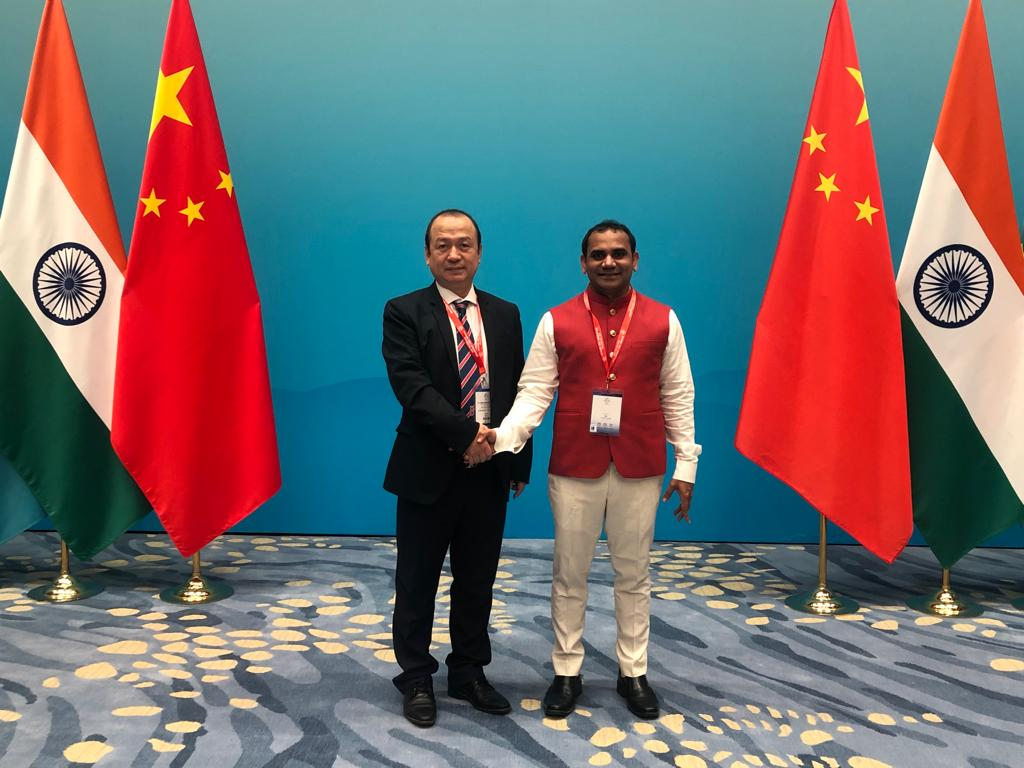
Gedela Srinubabu as FABA Vice President for China-India Bilateral

In 2013, Gedela served as the vice-president of the Federation of Asian Biotech Association (FABA) to improve the global trade, BS Bajaj said that the representation and services of Gedela is crucial in increasing FABA's global growth. In 2019, he worked for Bilateral investment treaty of India and China.

He was the co-convener of the G20 Health, Pharma, and Tech Summit Series, a private technology conference unaffiliated to the G20, but held during a G20 summit.

=== Europe-India trade delegation ===
Belgium Embassy delegates and European delegation team visited the Pulsus Group office in Hyderabad in 2018 to sign an agreement to establish a Pulsus center in Belgium. At the 2019 Thessaloniki International Fair (TIF) held in Greece, Gedela along with Indian Union Minister Hardeep Singh Puri participated as Indian delegation and met with the Prime Minister of Greece, Kyriakos Mitsotakis to discuss the translation of health care and agriculture information into regional languages.

=== Scientific publishing ===
Gedela founded the notorious open-access publisher OMICS Publishing Group, widely regarded as predatory. He purchased Pulsus Group in 2016, causing controversy and putting the future of the journals that it published into question. The company has been placed on Jeffrey Beall's list of "Potential, possible, or probable" predatory open-access publishers.

==== OMICS Publishing Group ====
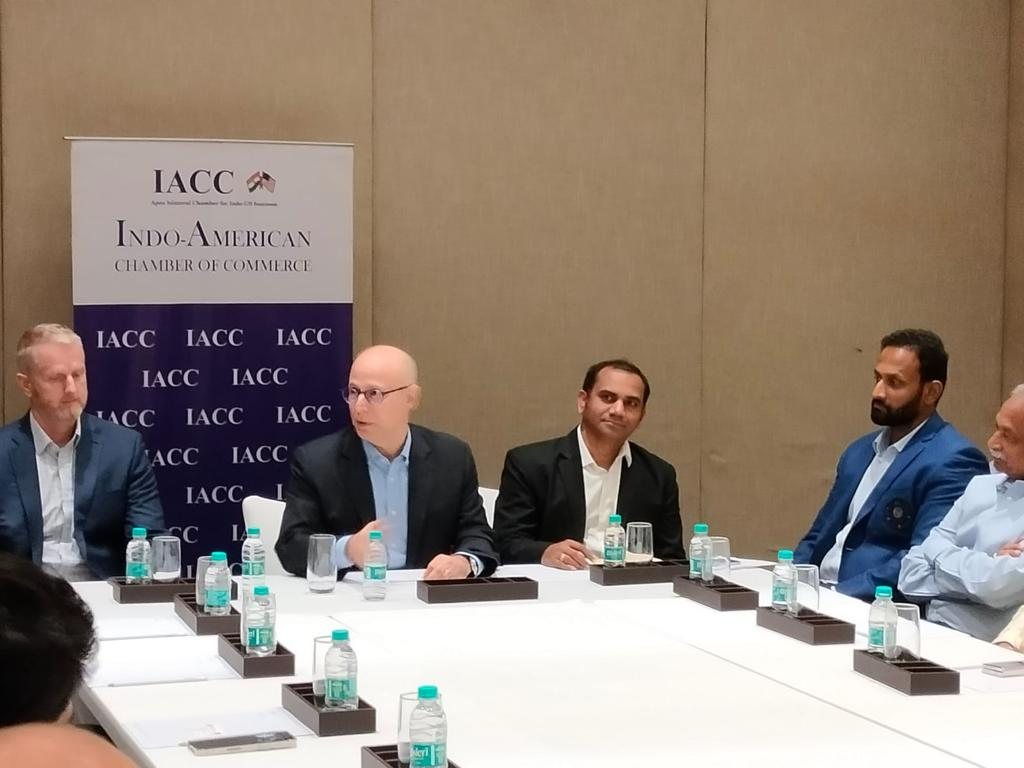
Gedela Srinubabu - Indo American Chamber of Commerce 2022

Since 2013, American library scientist Jeffrey Beall has used his personal blog, scholarlyoa.com, to criticise the publishing practises of OMICS Publishing Group and its CEO Gedela. Through his blog, allegations were made against OMICS regarding the quality of its scientific journals and its business practises. In May 2013, OMICS Publishing Group, which had also been included on Beall's list of predatory open access publishers, issued a warning to Beall stating that they intended to sue him, and were seeking $1 billion in damages under section 66A of India's Information Technology Act, 2000. However, section 66A was struck down as unconstitutional by the Supreme Court of India in an unrelated case in 2015. Effective January 2017, Beall's list was removed from the University of Colorado Denver website, and he shut his blogs. However, no further follow-up was made about damages of $1 billion in legal affairs.

In 2016, based on Beall's allegations, the US Federal Trade Commission (FTC) filed a lawsuit against OMICS' publishing practices, citing their detrimental effects on American publishers' loss of trade to the United States. If 10,000 articles article is published in open access journals, the publication cost is about $10 million with an average $2000 article processing cost, depending on the open-access journal publisher's model, and if the same 10,000 articles are published under a subscription business, they can generate about $500 million annually by giving subscriptions to thousands of universities and research institutions across the world. Subscription models are followed by the majority of Western publishing companies, including academic publishing companies of United States. Gedela commented on the case filed by the FTC: "The Federal Trade Commission's allegation is completely wrong... They don't know what a journal is. Don't know what peer review is. They are illiterate in this matter. But scientists are not illiterate, they know which article to publish in which journal."

In April 2019, the court imposed a fine of US$50.1 million on OMICS companies. OMICS' lawyer said that this was an unfair allegation and that OMICS would sue FTC for $3.11 billion in damages, saying it had caused loss of revenue and reputation.

=== Politics ===
Srinibabu was Uttarandhra co-ordinator of the Jana Sena Party from 2018 to 2019. The party announced Gedelaas the Jana Sena candidate for the Visakhapatnam parliamentary constituency in the 2019 general elections, but after two or three days, Gedela left the party and joined the YSR Congress Party. He was appointed as state general secretary by Telugu Desam Party in 2024.

== Philanthropic activities ==
In 2018, Gedela visited areas affected by Cyclone Titli and observed distribution of food, blankets and clothing. His organization has donated ₹1 crore (US$100,000) to the government of Andhra Pradesh, ₹25 lakh (US$26,000) to the government of Telangana and distributed masks and sanitizers in various districts for the relief of coronavirus during the COVID-19 pandemic in India, and also donated ₹20 lakh (US$21,000) to Ram Mandir construction.

In 2022, he was appointed to the executive council of Dr. B. R. Ambedkar University, Srikakulam.

== Recognition ==
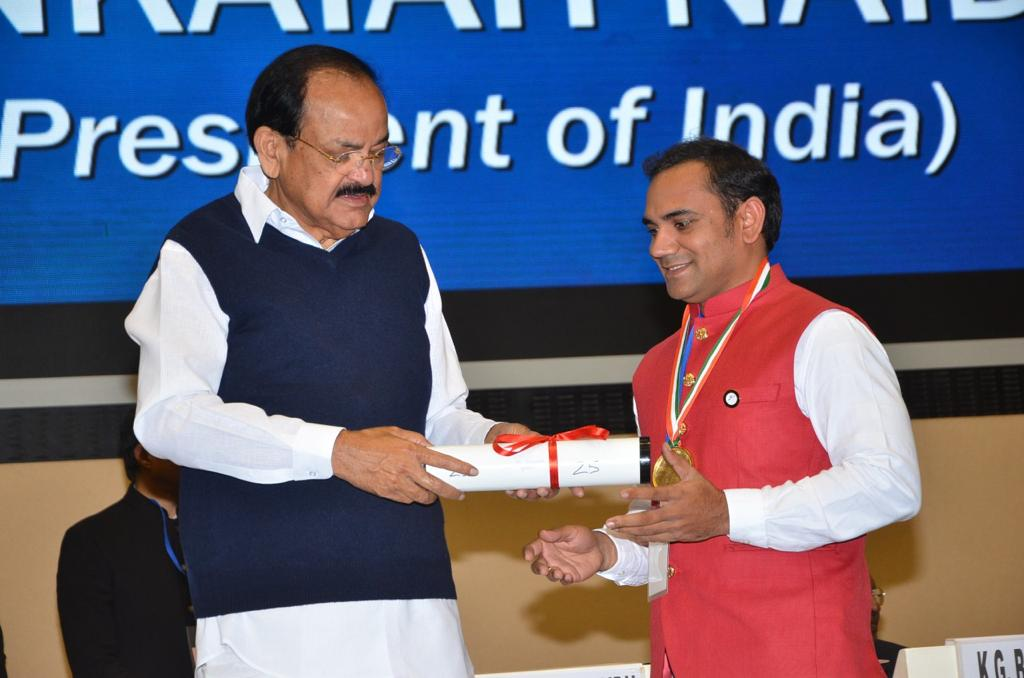
Dr Srinubabu Gedela Champions of Change Award from Vice President of India

Gedela received the Indian pride of the Nation Award in 2019, and the government of India Champions of Change 2018 award.

== Andhra Premier League Vizag Warriors ==
Gedela is the owner of Vizag Warriors, of the Andhra Premier League, a T20 cricket league in Andhra Pradesh. Indian actor, producer and businessman Ram Charan has invested in the team with Gedela, aiming to get the team promoted to the IPL in 2024.
