= Vitamins & Minerals =

Vitamins & Minerals may refer to:

- Vitamins & Minerals (EP), a 2004 EP by Blueprint
- Vitamins & Minerals (journal), an academic journal published by OMICS Publishing Group
