= Cabell Publishing =

American scholarly analytics company

Cabells
- Company type: Private
- Industry: Analytics
- Founded: 1978
- Founder: David W. E. Cabell
- Headquarters: Beaumont, Texas, United States
- Products: Journalytics; Predatory Reports
- Website: www.cabells.com

Cabells is a scholarly analytics company based in Beaumont, Texas. Established in 1978 by management professor David Cabell, it originally maintained only a directory of verified business academic journals. Since then, it has grown to include Journalytics, a database with analytics on reputable journals, Predatory Reports, a database of predatory journals with violation reports, journal metrics, and manuscript preparation tools. Journalytics has been expanded to include many types of information about the included journals, such as article acceptance rates and average review times. As of 2017, the company's Journalytics platform contains over 11,000 journals. In June 2020, Cabells changed the name of its whitelist and blacklist to Journalytics and Predatory Reports, respectively. In May 2023, Cabells reduced their workforce by a third in a round of unannounced and instant layoffs.

== Predatory Reports ==
In 2015, Cabells began working with Jeffrey Beall, the creator of Beall's list, on developing a new list of predatory journals. In early 2017, Beall's list was abruptly taken offline, leading to speculation that Cabells was involved in the list's removal; the company denied any involvement. On June 15, 2017, Cabells launched its own database of academic journals it considers predatory. In June 2020, Cabells changed the name of its blacklist to Predatory Reports. In February 2020, Predatory Reports exceeded 13,000 deceptive journals listed. Like their original whitelist they have maintained since 1978, Predatory Reports is subscription-only.

== Reception ==
With regard to Journalytics, Manhattan College librarian William H. Walters noted that "Cabell’s maintains minimum standards for inclusion but is not comprehensive in its coverage of good journals." A Charleston Advisor reviewer wrote that "Cabell’s takes complaints about journals in their database seriously, and they will conduct a review and decide if it’s necessary to remove the offending publication." But they also noted, "Inclusion in Cabell’s is not an automatic stamp of quality. Users should realize that while Cabell’s prohibits journals that their staff deems predatory, publications of low quality will not necessarily be excluded."
