= Cabells' Predatory Reports =

Proprietary list of deceptive, predatory academic journals

Cabells' Predatory Reports is a paid subscription service provided by Cabell Publishing featuring a database of deceptive and predatory journals, and Journalytics is a database of "verified, reputable journals", with details about those journals' acceptance rates and invited article percentages. In June 2020, Cabells changed the name of its previous Whitelist and Blacklist to Journalytics and Predatory Reports, respectively. Cabells describes Predatory Reports as "the only database of deceptive and predatory academic journals." Some freely available alternatives exist.

== Subscription ==
Unlike Beall's List, which went offline permanently in early 2017, Predatory Reports is available on a subscription basis. Specifically, it is available either as a standalone product or as an "add-on" at a discounted rate to subscribers to at least one discipline in Journalytics.

The company originally considered offering its list for free. It then decided that the cost of building and maintaining it was too high for a free service.

== Criteria ==
Cabells has produced two transparent criteria versions: v1.0 and v1.1. Cabells' v1.0 contains 64 criteria, which are organised by subject matter such as "integrity", "peer review", and "publication practices". This v1.0 evaluation list was used for the preparation of the deceptive journal list before it was launched until early 2019, when Cabells launched its new v1.1 criteria version. This v1.1 evaluation checklist features 74 behavioural indicators, which are grouped "according to relative severity and subject matter". Some of the criteria used by Cabells to tag journals as predatory have been criticized, including, for instance, the indicator "no policies for digital preservation”, the interpretation of which is very subjective.

== Reception ==
Cabell's list has been criticized for including numerous empty journals, which "raises serious questions about the ways in which they prioritise journals for inclusion and their willingness to provide an up-to-date and useful blacklist to the scholarly community". Other concerns include "questionable weighing and reviewing methods" and "a lack of rigour in how Cabell applies its own procedures" as "identical criteria are recorded multiple times in individual journal entries" and "discrepancies exist between reviewing dates and the criteria version used and recorded by Cabell". Journals on Predatory Reports are not re-assessed by Cabells and as such the entries can rapidly become outdated.

Jeffrey Beall has argued that deceptive journal lists are useful to researchers who want to know where to publish, adding that he thinks Cabell's appeals process will be one of the most challenging aspects to manage. Aalto University economist Natalia Zinovyeva told Nature that it will be "extremely valuable" to help academic committees evaluate researchers' CVs. Rick Anderson, the former president of the Society for Scholarly Publishing, wrote: "Overall, I find the Cabell's Blacklist product to be a carefully crafted, honestly managed, and highly useful tool for libraries, faculty committees, and authors."

== See also ==
- Journalology
