= Center for Promoting Ideas =

The Center for Promoting Ideas (CPI) is an organization that engages in predatory publishing. Run out of Bangladesh with a claimed office in New York, it publishes a number of journals that publish academic articles for payment, claiming they are "peer-reviewed and refereed". Like many predatory journals it operates under the guise of an open access model. The Chronicle of Higher Education reported in 2018 that authors wired money to Bangladesh and sometimes never saw their paper published, or edited poorly. In addition, the CPI habitually lists unwitting academics as editors in chief or members of the editorial board, against their wishes.

One such scholar is American academic J. Peter Pham, who has been listed as on the editorial board of the International Journal of Humanities and Social Science since 2011, despite having sent letters asking to be removed. As of November 2022, he is still listed.

== Journals published by the CPI ==
Predatory journals often take an existing journal's name and put "International" in front of it, according to an editorial in the Journal of Nuclear Cardiology. Journals published by the CPI are listed on Beall's list.

Titles found on CPI website:

- American International Journal of Contemporary Research
- American International Journal of Social Science
- International Journal of Applied Science and Technology
- International Journal of Business and Social Science
- International Journal of Business, Humanities and Technology
- International Journal of Humanities and Social Science
- International Journal of Language & Linguistics
- Journal of Agriculture & Life Sciences
- Journal of Business & Economic Policy
- Journal of Education & Social Policy
