= Open Access Scholarly Publishing Association =

Industry association in scholarly publishing

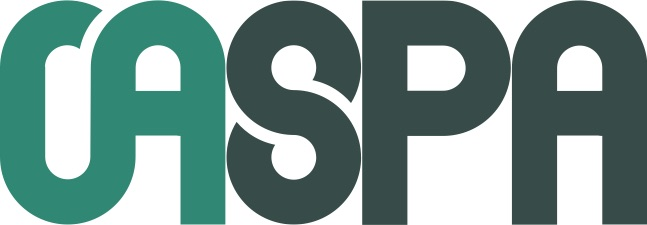
- Abbreviation: OASPA
- Formation: 14 October 2008; 18 years ago
- Type: International professional association
- Headquarters: Online
- Location: The Hague, The Netherlands
- Members: Scholarly open access publishers
- Official language: English
- Chair of Board: Jennifer Gibson
- Website: oaspa.org

The Open Access Scholarly Publishing Association (OASPA) is a non-profit trade association of open access journal and book publishers. Having started with an exclusive focus on open access journals, it has since expanded its activities to include matters pertaining to open access books and open scholarly infrastructure.

== History ==
The OASPA was launched on October 14, 2008 at an "Open Access Day" celebration in London hosted by the Wellcome Trust. The following organizations are founding members:

- BioMed Central
- Co-Action Publishing
- Copernicus Publications
- Hindawi Publishing Corporation
- JMIR Publications
- Medical Education Online (David Solomon)
- Public Library of Science
- SAGE Publications
- SPARC Europe
- Utrecht University Library

The OASPA faced some criticism for a perceived conflict between its self-declared role as the "stamp of quality for open access publishing" and the application of its own criteria for membership. One member organization, Frontiers Media, was included on Jeffrey Beall's list of predatory open access publishing companies. Two members, Hindawi and MDPI - initially called predatory by Beall - were later removed from his list after pressure was applied to his employer. There was also concern around the fact that OASPA had been founded by BioMed Central and other open access publishers, which would cause a conflict of interest in their "seal of approval". OASPA has also been criticized for promoting gold open access in a way that may be at the expense of green open access.

== Activities ==
OASPA organizes an annual conference on open access scholarly publishing.

OASPA encourages publishers to use Creative Commons licenses, particularly the Creative Commons Attribution License (CC-BY), which is in line with most definitions of "open", e.g. the Open Definition by the Open Knowledge Foundation.

== Members ==
OASPA members fall into the following groups:

Professional publishing organisations – Organisations that include at least one full-time professional who manages the publication of OA scholarly journals or books. These organisations may be for-profit or nonprofit, and they may own journals or books or manage the publication on a contract basis for societies or other groups of scientists or scholars. Members of this class may also include organisations such as academic/research libraries, university presses, or other organisations in which the primary focus is other than publishing but still employ full-time professionals who manage the publication of OA scholarly journals and/or books.

Scholar publishers – Individuals or small groups of scientists/scholars that publish usually a single scholarly journal in their field of study. The publication process is often largely subsidised by volunteer effort.

Other organisations – Other organisations who provide significant services and/or support for OA publishing.

In order to join OASPA as a member organization, a publisher must undergo an assessment process and meet set criteria. These criteria were set in 2013 and revised again in August 2018. There are seven categories of OASPA membership:

- Professional Publishing Organisation (Small)
- Professional Publishing Organisation (Medium)
- Professional Publishing Organisation (Large)
- Professional Publishing Organisation (Very Large)
- Other Organisation (non-commercial)
- Other Organisation (commercial)
- Scholar Publisher

As of March 2021, OASPA has 159 members.

Members of OASPA that publish journals exclusively in OA comprise the Fully Open Access Publishers special interest group.

== Response to the Science sting ==
As a response to the Who's Afraid of Peer Review? investigation, OASPA formed a committee to investigate the circumstances that led to the acceptance of the fake paper by 3 of its members. On 11 November 2013, OASPA terminated the membership of two publishers (Dove Medical Press and Hikari Ltd.) who accepted the fake paper. Sage Press, which also accepted a fake paper, was put "under review" for 6 months. Sage announced in a statement that it was reviewing the journal that accepted the fake paper, but that it would not shut it down. Sage's membership was reinstated at the end of the review period following changes to the journal's editorial processes. Dove Medical Press were also reinstated in September 2015 after making a number of improvements to their editorial processes.

== See also ==
- Association for Learned and Professional Society Publishers
- Association of Publishing Agencies
- Directory of Open Access Journals
- International Association of Scientific, Technical, and Medical Publishers
- International Publishers Association
- Category:Open access publishers
- Periodical Publishers Association
- Scholarly Publishing and Academic Resources Coalition
- Society for Scholarly Publishing
