= International Journal of Insect Science =

- Discipline: Entomology
- Language: English
- Edited by: Helen Hull-Sanders

Publication details
- History: 2009-present
- Publisher: Libertas Academica
- Open access: Yes
- License: Creative Commons By Attribution

Standard abbreviations
- ISO 4: Int. J. Insect Sci.

Indexing
- ISSN: 1179-5433
- OCLC no.: 430355880

Links
- Journal homepage

The International Journal of Insect Science was a peer-reviewed open-access scientific journal published by SAGE Publishing, and is no longer accepting submissions. The journal covers fundamental, experimental, and applied research.

== Abstracting and indexing ==
This journal is indexed by the following services:

- Chemical Abstracts Service
- The Zoological Record
