= Stephen Lock =

English haematologist and medical journal editor

Stephen Penford Lock CBE FRCP (born 8 April 1929) is an English haematologist and editor who served from 1975 to 1991 as editor-in-chief of the UK medical journal, the British Medical Journal, known since 1988 as the BMJ. A prominent scholar of the peer review process, he coined the term "journalology" to refer to the scientific study of the academic publishing process. In 1990, Eugene Garfield described him as "an elder statesman of biomedical editing".

Lock was educated at Queens' College, Cambridge, and St Bartholomew's Hospital Medical College, where he trained in haematology. He worked at St Bartholomew's Hospital, the Hospital for Sick Children, and other hospitals before joining the BMJ. He originally began working at the BMJ in 1964 as an assistant editor, and was promoted to the positions of senior assistant editor and deputy editor before becoming editor-in-chief in 1975.

In 1982, while editor of the BMJ, he introduced its Christmas edition, which contained many humorous articles, as well as interesting historical stories about medicine. This light-hearted edition has since become an annual tradition, although in recent years the humorous elements have been less emphasized. Lock also changed the journal's peer review system by introducing a "hanging committee", consisting initially of two clinicians and two of the journal's official editors; the committee was responsible for choosing papers to publish in the BMJ from a pool of submissions recommended from outside reviewers. The term "hanging committee" reflected the kind of activities that an art gallery would undertake in deciding whether to hang particular works of art.

Lock was a co-founder, with Edward Huth, of the Vancouver Group (later the International Committee of Medical Journal Editors), and a former president of the European Association of Science Editors.
