= Libertas Academica =

Open access academic journal publisher based in New Zealand

Libertas Academica (LA) was an open access academic journal publisher specializing in the biological sciences and clinical medicine. It was founded in 2004 and acquired by SAGE Publications in 2016.

== Background ==
Libertas Academica is a publisher of open access ("OA") scientific, technical and medical journals. It is privately funded and was founded specifically to publish OA journals. It was established in late 2004 with the launch of two journals, Evolutionary Bioinformatics and Cancer Informatics. Additional journals have been published since. It was included on a list of "predatory" open access publishers in 2010 but later removed. In 2013, a sham study reporting that a compound isolated from lichen can kill cancer cells was submitted to one of the journals published by Libertas for peer review. After review, the sham study was correctly rejected for publication.

== Journal indexing ==
Libertas Academica sought indexing on DOAJ, PubMed, MEDLINE, and PubMed Central. Articles also appeared in other indexes and repositories, including OAIster and Pubget. The publisher offered an Open Archives Initiative Protocol for Metadata Harvesting.

== Green and Gold OA ==
SHERPA/RoMEO has identified LA as a Green OA publisher. This means that authors are permitted to archive their work prior to and after publication. LA is also a gold OA publisher because all articles are freely available online immediately upon publication.

== Copyright ==
All articles, including meta-data and supplementary files, are published under the Creative Commons Attribution license. All journals fully indexed by DOAJ have been awarded the SPARC Europe Seal owing to the use of this copyright policy.

== Defunct journals ==
This is a partial list of defunct Libertas Academica journals. A number of Libertas Academica journals ceased publishing after acquisition by SAGE.

- Analytical Chemistry Insights (2006-2018)
