= Journalology =

Scholarly study of academic journals

Journalology, also referred to as publication science, is the scholarly study of all aspects of the academic publishing process. The field seeks to improve the quality of scholarly research by implementing evidence-based practices in academic publishing. The term "journalology" was coined by Stephen Lock, the former editor-in-chief of the BMJ. The first Peer Review Congress, held in 1989 in Chicago, Illinois, is considered a pivotal moment in the founding of journalology as a distinct field. The field of journalology has exerted a significant influence in promoting the adoption of pre-registration in scientific research, particularly in the domain of clinical trials. Clinical trial registration is now expected in most countries. Journalology researchers also work to reform the peer review process.

== History ==
The earliest scientific journals were founded in the seventeenth century. While most early journals used peer review, peer review did not become common practice in medical journals until after World War II. The scholarly publishing process (including peer review) did not arise by scientific means and still suffers from problems with reliability (consistency and dependability), such as a lack of uniform standards and validity (well-founded, efficacious). Attempts to reform the academic publishing practice began to gain traction in the late twentieth century. The field of journalology was formally established in 1989.

== See also ==
- Journal ranking
  - SCImago Journal Rank
  - SCOPUS
- MEDLINE
- Metascience
- Open science
- Predatory publishing
  - Beall's List
  - Cabell's blacklist
  - GAJET List
- Bibliometrics
- Scientometrics
