= Predatory conference =

Meetings set up to appear as legitimate scientific conferences

Predatory conferences or predatory meetings are meetings set up to appear as legitimate scientific conferences but which are exploitative as they do not provide proper editorial control over presentations, the topics covered can diverge substantially from what has been advertised, and advertising can include claims of involvement of prominent academics who are, in fact, uninvolved. They are an expansion of the predatory publishing business model, which involves the creation of academic publications built around an exploitative business model that generally involves charging publication fees to authors without providing the editorial and publishing services associated with legitimate journals.

== Overview ==
Jeffrey Beall coined the term "predatory meetings" as analogous to "predatory publications" and explains that the business model involves "conferences organized by revenue-seeking companies that want to exploit researchers' need to build their vitas with conference presentations and papers in the published proceedings or affiliated journals," these affiliated journals being predatory journals. Early-career academics and scholars from developing countries are the most likely to be at risk of exploitation by predatory meetings, just as is the case with the predatory publications. Predatory meetings have been reported to accept submissions of very poor quality, to claim that uninvolved academics are on the organising committee, and to deliberately mimic well-established conferences to gain submissions. Organisers of predatory meetings include the World Academy of Science, Engineering and Technology (WASET) and the OMICS Publishing Group; however, there are many other organizations directly targeting students, faculty, and other researchers with invitations to participate in this type of conferences. In 2016 the Federal Trade Commission launched a case against OMICS regarding its predatory journals and conferences and in 2019 a federal judge ruled that OMICS made deceptive claims to academics and researchers about the nature of their conferences and publications and ordered Srinubabu Gedela (CEO and owner of OMICS) and his companies to pay more than 50 million dollars. The legal representative for OMICS contended that the accusation was unjust, asserting that OMICS had filed a $3.11 billion lawsuit against the US Federal Trade Commission. The lawsuit alleges that the Commission's actions resulted in both financial losses and damage to OMICS' reputation.

Beall coined the term "predatory meetings" for a new activity of OMICS and others in organising scientific conferences claiming editorial boards and organising committees with prominent academics who have not agreed to participate, with high fees for attendance, and with poor reviewing standards for acceptance. The business model involves "conferences organized by revenue-seeking companies that want to exploit researchers' need to build their vitas with conference presentations and papers in the published proceedings or affiliated journals," and additional profit can be made when these affiliated journals are predatory publishers potentially linked to the conference organisers (as are OMICS and Conference Series, for example). Deceptively similar names to existing reputable conferences are also used, and conference locations are also creating the potential for confusion. For example, in 2013 the OMICS named a conference "Entomology-2013," a name nearly identical to the one used by the Entomological Society of America (ESA) for its annual meeting, Entomology 2013. Similarly, the ESA's annual "International Congress of Entomology" has been mimicked by OMICS with an "International Conference of Entomology." Other groups have used this approach, one example being the once-every-five-years "International Conference on Traffic and Transport Psychology" organised by the Centre for Accident Research and Road Safety – Queensland for Brisbane in August, 2016, was preceded by the predatory World Academy of Science, Engineering and Technology (WASET)–organised International Conferences on Traffic and Transport Psychology in Osaka in 2015 and Chicago in 2016.

Beall has criticised the financial arrangements for OMICS conferences, noting that the "registration policy shows that they never grant refunds for registration fees – even if they themselves cancel or postpone the conference. Instead, they grant a credit for other OMICS conferences." If someone registers to attend one of these conferences, and then realises they sought a different conference with the same or a similar name, a refund is not possible. This is partly why Beall recommends, "in the strongest terms possible, that all scholars from all countries avoid doing business in any way with the OMICS Group. Do not submit papers. Do not agree to serve on their editorial boards. Do not register for or attend their conferences."

== Prevalence ==
The number of predatory conferences has increased rapidly, with OMICS alone stating in 2016 that they host about 3,000 conferences per year. Christoph Bartneck, then an associate professor in information technology at New Zealand's University of Canterbury, was invited to attend a conference, organised under OMICS' ConferenceSeries banner, on atomic and nuclear physics to be held in late 2016. Having little knowledge of this subject as an IT professor, Bartneck used iOS's autocomplete function to write a submission, choosing randomly from its suggestions after starting each sentence using words like "atomic" and "nuclear", and submitted it under the name Iris Pear (a reference to Siri and Apple). The 516-word abstract contained the words "good" and "great" a combined total of 28 times. Despite being obvious nonsense, the work was accepted within three hours of submission and a conference registration fee of US $1,099 requested. Bartneck commented that he was "reasonably certain that this is a money-making conference with little to no commitment to science", a comment he based on the poor "quality of the review process" and the high cost of attendance, and consistent with Beall's criticisms.

== Characteristics ==
Characteristics of predatory meetings which are similar to those attracting criticism in predatory publishing include: Rapid acceptance of submissions with poor quality control and little or no true peer review; acceptance of submissions consisting of nonsense or hoaxed content; notification of high attendance fees and charges only after acceptance; claiming involvement of academics in conference organising committees without their agreement, and not allowing them to resign; mimicry of the names or website styles of more established conferences, including holding a similarly named conference in the same city; and promoting meetings with unrelated images lifted from the Internet.

== Federal Trade Commission action ==
On 25 August 2016, the Federal Trade Commission (FTC) filed a lawsuit against the OMICS Group, iMedPub, ConferenceSeries, and Gedela Srinubabu (the Indian national who is president of the companies), partly in response to on-going pressure to act against predatory publishers. The complaint, lodged with the United States District Court for the District of Nevada jointly by the FTC and federal prosecutor Daniel Bogden, alleges that the defendants have been "deceiving academics and researchers about the nature of its publications and hiding publication fees ranging from hundreds to thousands of dollars." The complaint also covers predatory meetings, noting that "OMICS regularly advertises conferences featuring academic experts who were never scheduled to appear in order to attract registrants" and that attendees "spend hundreds or thousands of dollars on registration fees and travel costs to attend these scientific conferences." Attorneys for the OMICS Group published a response on their website, claiming "your FTC allegations are baseless. Further we understand that FTC working towards favoring some subscription based journals publishers who are earning Billions of dollars from scientists literature [sic]", and suggesting that corporations in the scientific publishing business were behind the allegations.

The court ruled in favor of the FTC in March 2019, and ordered Gedela Srinubabu and his companies to pay $50.1 million in damages.
