= Structural Engineering Research Centre =

Research institute in Chennai

- Established: 1965
- Director: Dr. N. Anandavalli
- Location: CSIR Road, CSIR Campus, Taramani, Chennai, Tamil Nadu, India
- Website: www.serc.res.in

CSIR-Structural Engineering Research Centre (CSIR-SERC), Chennai is one of the 38 constituent laboratories of the Council of Scientific and Industrial Research in India. The institute is a certified ISO:9001 quality institute.

== Charter ==
CSIR-SERC is involved in research and development in the field of designing, construction and rehabilitation of structures. The institute provides services including design consultancy and proof checking to various public and private sector organizations.

Specialized courses for practicing engineers are also provided by the institute.

== Facilities ==
The institute has various laboratories, which are listed as follows.

1. Advance Concrete Testing and Evaluation Lab
2. Advance Materials Lab
3. Advanced Seismic Testing and Research Lab
4. Fatigue and Fracture Lab
5. Special and Multifunctional Structures Lab
6. Steel Structures Lab
7. Structural Health Monitoring Lab
8. Theoretical & Computational Mechanics Lab
9. Tower Testing & Research Station
10. Wind Engineering Lab
