= OMICS Publishing Group =

Discredited academic publishing company

- Parent company: OMICS Group Inc
- Status: Active
- Founded: 2007; 19 years ago
- Founder: Srinubabu Gedela
- Country of origin: India
- Headquarters location: Hyderabad, Telangana
- Distribution: Worldwide
- Publication types: Open access journals
- Nonfiction topics: Science, technology; medicine
- Revenue: US$11.6 million (2016)
- No. of employees: 1500
- Official website: www.omicsonline.org/about.php

OMICS Publishing Group is a predatory publisher of open access academic journals. It started publishing its first journal in 2008. By 2015, it claimed over 700 journals, although about half of them were defunct. Its subsidiaries and brands include Allied Academies, Andrew John Publishing Inc., Ashdin Publishing, Conference Series LLC LTD, EuroSciCon LTD, Hilaris Publishing, Insight Medical Publishing (iMedPub) LTD, International Online Medical Council (IOMC), International Research Journals, IT Medical Team, Longdom Publishing SL, Open Access Journals, Meetings International, Prime Scholars, Pulsus Group, Research & Reviews, Scholars Central, SciTechnol, Trade Science Inc, Life Science Events and Walsh Medical Media.

OMICS has come under attack by numerous academics and the United States government over the validity of the peer review by OMICS journals, the appropriateness of its fees and marketing, and the apparent advertising of the names of scientists as journal editors or conference speakers without their knowledge or permission. The U.S. National Institutes of Health sent a cease-and-desist letter to OMICS in 2013, demanding it to discontinue with false claims of affiliation with U.S. government entities or employees. In August 2016, OMICS became the first academic publisher to be sued by the U.S. Federal Trade Commission (FTC) for deceptive practices; nearly three years later, the FTC was awarded a summary judgement of over US$50 million.

OMICS has responded to criticisms by avowing a commitment to open access publishing, claiming that detractors are traditional subscription-based publishers who feel threatened by their open-access publishing model. It responded to the FTC suit by maintaining that their practices were legal and claiming that corporate interests were driving the suit. It has also threatened a prominent critic, Jeffrey Beall, with a $1 billion lawsuit for defamation.

== History ==
OMICS Publishing Group was founded in 2007 by Srinubabu Gedela, who remains the company's director. He founded OMICS because of his difficulty in accessing high-cost journal contents as a PhD student.

It started its first open-access journal, the Journal of Proteomics & Bioinformatics, in 2008. In 2012, OMICS Group had more than 200 journal titles, about 60% of which had no content. By 2015, it claimed over 700 titles, but about half of them were defunct. Several OMICS journals have names similar to existing publications. For instance, BioMed Central established the Journal of Biomedical Science in 1994, while OMICS established the Journal of Biomedical Sciences in 2012.

OMICS employed around 2,000 people. In 2016, the company had revenue of $11.6 million and generated a profit of about $1.2 million. The Government of India has waived taxes whilst granting subsidized land for the construction of new headquarters.

== Publishing activities ==
OMICS operates on a gold open access model, wherein the author pays for publication and the publisher makes the articles available for free. As well as publication fees, OMICS charges a withdrawal fee for manuscripts that are withdrawn five or more days after submission. Such withdrawal fees are not levied by non-predatory publishers, and have been criticized as unethical and as discouraging researchers from making post-submission corrections to their work.

In addition to publishing journals, OMICS also organizes conferences. In 2017, about 3,000 such conferences were organized. The conference arm makes up about 60% of OMICS' revenue.

In 2012 OMICS launched an additional group of 53 additional journals under the brand name 'SciTechnol', however as of 2021 the SciTechnol website does not disclose this relationship.

== Criticism of publishing practices ==
OMICS is widely regarded as a predatory publisher. It has been subject to widespread criticism, notably by Jeffrey Beall, who included OMICS in his list of "potential, possible, or probable predatory" publishers. Among the criticism leveled at OMICS are that its journals are not actually peer-reviewed as advertised, often contain mistakes, and that its fees are excessive. OMICS says that its activities are legitimate and ethical, and that the quality of its editorial control does need improvement. Other criticisms of OMICS include the publication of pseudoscientific articles, deceptive marketing practices, targeting of young investigators or those in lower-income regions, and holding papers hostage by disallowing their withdrawal (preventing them from being published by other journals).

It has also been suggested that OMICS provides fake lists of scientists as journal editors to create an impression of scientific legitimacy, even though they are not involved in any review or editing process. One such editor-in-chief was contacted by Science, and he stated that he had never handled any papers; in an interview with The Hindu, another said he had not been informed of his purported editorship. Other academics have said that OMICS published articles unaltered in spite of their request for revisions. The company has also been slow to remove the names of editorial board members who requested to terminate their relationship with OMICS activities, in some cases taking almost two years. One author received an invoice for $2,700 after her paper was accepted; this fee was not mentioned in the email message OMICS sent her to solicit a submission. In 2012, while one OMICS journal rejected a paper after the reviewer noticed it was plagiarized from one of his own co-authored papers, another OMICS journal published the same paper later that year. When the reviewer again pointed this out, the paper was removed from OMICS' website in 2014, but no official retraction was posted. In 2013, an OMICS journal accepted a bogus and obviously flawed publication submitted as part of a sting operation by Science. Critics assert that the main purpose of the publisher is commercial rather than academic.

In September 2014, PubMed Central blacklisted OMICS journals, claiming serious concerns over OMICS' publishing practices. In 2017, Scopus delisted several OMICS journals for "publication concerns".

A Bloomberg News investigation in 2017 noted a tendency of pharmaceutical companies to publish in these journals, which might have stemmed from a self-interest in skipping rigorous review procedures. They were also the major sponsors of OMICS conferences.

=== OMICS Conferences ===
In 2013, Jeffrey Beall reported that OMICS has added conducting "predatory meetings" to its publications activity including under the ConferenceSeries banner. Beall criticised the financial arrangements for OMICS conferences and urged all scholars to refrain from any dealing with these conferences.

An example of such a meeting is the 2016 International Conference on Atomic and Nuclear Physics, organised by ConferenceSeries, and to which Christoph Bartneck, then an associate professor in Information Technology at New Zealand's University of Canterbury, was invited. With little knowledge of nuclear physics, Bartneck used iOS's autocomplete function to write the paper, choosing randomly from its suggestions after starting each sentence, and submitted it under the name Iris Pear (a reference to Siri and Apple). A sample sentence from the abstract for the resulting manuscript was: "The atoms of a better universe will have the right for the same as you are the way we shall have to be a great place for a great time to enjoy the day you are a wonderful person to your great time to take the fun and take a great time and enjoy the great day you will be a wonderful time for your parents and kids," and the 516-word abstract contained the words "good" and "great" a combined total of 28 times. Despite being obvious nonsense, the work was accepted within three hours of submission and a conference registration fee of $1,099 requested. Bartneck commented that he was "reasonably certain that this is a money-making conference with little to no commitment to science," a comment he based on the poor quality of the review process and the high cost of attendance. Gedela said that Bartneck's paper "slipped through" for being submitted "so close to the deadline".

In another example, Tom Spears of the Ottawa Citizen repeatedly submitted to OMICS conferences several sting abstracts that included "Evolution of flight characteristics in avian-porcine physiology" and "Strategies for remediation of benthic and pelagic species dependent on coral reefs: Cases of T. migratorius and G. californianus" which respectively claimed to explain how pigs fly and claimed roadrunner birds lived underwater. In yet another case, OMICS accepted a paper plagiarized from Aristotle and "garbled to remove any clear meaning" to an ethics journal, and later accepted the same paper to a conference on geriatrics and nursing.

It has been also found that many academic or government scientists are advertised as speakers or organizers for OMICS conferences, without their agreement.

=== Action by US government agencies ===
In April 2013, OMICS received a cease-and-desist letter from the United States Department of Health and Human Services (DHHS) after a complaint filed by Ken Witwer, who said he had been fooled by OMICS's deceptive marketing. The letter alleged that OMICS used images and names of employees that either no longer worked at NIH or did not provide permission, and asked OMICS not to use the name of its agencies institutes or employees for anything other than "true factual statements". OMICS responded by modifying its website and providing emails and letters from the NIH employees ostensibly agreeing to serve as editors of OMICS journals. Those employees later said that while they did agree to serve as editors, they did not provide permission for their names to be used in marketing materials; furthermore, they had not actually handled any manuscripts.

=== FTC suit ===
In August 2016, the U.S. Federal Trade Commission (FTC) filed a suit against OMICS, two of its affiliated companies and Gedela, charging them with deceptive publishing practices and seeking an unspecified monetary reimbursement for academics duped by them. In its first-ever suit against an academic publisher, they alleged OMICS' peer-review processes to be a "sham" and their claiming of renowned academics in their editorial board and/or as speakers at its conferences without their consent to be intentionally deceptive. The FTC also noted a failure to disclose publishing fees prior to accepting pieces, citing of dubious impact factors and false assertions about their journals being indexed in PubMed, when they are not.

In response to the lawsuit, OMICS rejected the various allegations, maintaining that their processes were legal and claiming that corporate interests were driving the suit.

The United States District Court for the District of Nevada handed down a preliminary injunction in November 2017, preventing OMICS from "making misrepresentations" about their journals and conferences, as well as requiring that OMICS clearly disclose all article processing charges. The FTC won a summary judgment (ECF No. 86) on 29 March 2019, with the court finding that OMICS made false claims about manuscripts being peer-reviewed, used the name of prominent researchers as editors of journals without their consent or knowledge, used misleading impact factors for journals which had not been calculated by Clarivate Analytics, made false claims about being indexed by PubMed, was not transparent about the publication fees charged per manuscript until after it had accepted an article for publication, and often did not allow researchers to withdraw their articles after submission. OMICS was ordered to pay a fine of $50,130,810 as well as change some of its publishing methods. OMICS plans to challenge the ruling. On September 11, 2020, the U.S. Court of Appeals for the Ninth Circuit upheld the grant of summary judgment and the $50.1 million award.

=== Legal threat to Jeffrey Beall ===
In 2013, OMICS Publishing Group sent a letter to then University of Colorado librarian Jeffrey Beall stating that they intended to sue him and were seeking $1 billion in damages. In their six-page letter, OMICS stated that Beall's blog is "ridiculous, baseless, impertinent", and "smacks of literal unprofessionalism and arrogance". Beall said that he found the letter "to be poorly written and personally threatening," and that he thought: "the letter is an attempt to detract from the enormity of OMICS's editorial practices".

OMICS' law firm said it was pursuing damages under India's Information Technology Act, 2000, referring to section 66A, which makes it illegal to use a computer to publish "any information that is grossly offensive or has menacing character" or to publish false information. It stated that three years in prison was a possible penalty, although a U.S. lawyer said that the threats seemed to be a "publicity stunt" that were meant to "intimidate". An editorial in the New Delhi-based India Today cited the incident as evidence that Section 66A should be discarded to eliminate its use in "stifling political dissent, crushing speech and ... enabling bullying". In 2015, Section 66A was struck down by the Supreme Court of India in an unrelated case.

=== Acquisition of Canadian publishers ===
In late September 2016, OMICS acquired two Canadian publishers—Andrew John Publishing and Pulsus Group—and sixteen journals published by them. The acquisition led to a decline in publishing standards for these journals, caused concern that the names of the publishers were being hijacked to lend credence to bogus science, and led to six of the sixteen journals stating their intention to terminate their publishing contracts with OMICS.

=== Fake articles ===
In 2023, Mike Downes stated that to the list of fraudulent practices undertaken by predatory publishers "must be added the invention or compilation of articles ostensibly written by academic scholars but in fact crafted by the publishing house in question", noting that "the majority are created under a fake name by compiling a set of plagiarized passages extracted from the specialized literature or cannibalized from within the journal's own archive". Downes's research showed that all of OMICS's subsidiaries and imprints have created and published such articles, arguing that this was evidence that "the directive to carry out this fraudulent scheme appears to have been a chosen policy coming from the top management" of OMICS.
