= Society for Scholarly Publishing =

Scholarly professional organization

- SSP updated its visual identity in 2017
- Abbreviation: SSP
- Headquarters: Mount Laurel, NJ
- Website: sspnet.org

The Society for Scholarly Publishing (SSP) is a professional society, founded in 1978, dedicated to promoting and advancing communication and networking among all sectors of the scholarly communications community. It has approximately 1,100 members from 24 countries including publishers, service providers, librarians, researchers, and consultants.

SSP is organized as a 501(c)(3) tax-exempt educational society.

== Scope ==
The Society for Scholarly Publishing (SSP), founded in 1978, is a nonprofit organization formed to promote and advance communication among all sectors of the scholarly publication community through networking, information dissemination, and facilitation of new developments in the field.

SSP members represent all aspects of scholarly publishing — including publishers, printers, e-products developers, technical service providers, librarians, and editors. SSP members come from a wide range of large and small commercial and nonprofit organizations. They meet at SSP's annual meetings, educational seminars, webinars, and Focus Groups to hear the latest trends from respected colleagues and to discuss common and mutual (and sometimes divergent) goals and viewpoints.

SSP is also unique among scholarly communications associations in that it does not take positions on political issues.

== Activities ==
=== The Scholarly Kitchen ===
The Scholarly Kitchen (TSK or "the Kitchen") is a blog published by the SSP. Contributors include senior professionals in scholarly communications. Topics cover journals, textbooks, open access, metrics, and research libraries. The blog was founded in 2008 by Kent Anderson, who served as the editor-in-chief until 2013 when he became president of SSP. Since then, David Crotty has been the executive editor.

The Scholarly Kitchen was a 2010 nominee for the Webby "Blog-Business" award.

It has been an important site within academia for discussion of the open access movement.

The Society for Scholarly Publishing established The Scholarly Kitchen in February 2008 to:

1. Keep SSP members and interested parties aware of new developments in publishing
2. Point to research reports and projects
3. Interpret the significance of relevant research in a balanced way (or occasionally in a provocative way)
4. Suggest areas that need more input by identifying gaps in knowledge
5. Translate findings from related endeavors (publishing outside STM, online business, user trends)
6. Attract the community of STM information experts interested in these things and give them a place to contribute

==== The Chefs ====
The Kitchen's 20 or so volunteer bloggers are called "Chefs". They work for diverse organizations in scholarly communications. Their affiliations include society publishers, government agencies, academic libraries, and commercial publishers. Several TSK Chefs are independent consultants. The authors represent their own views, and do not claim to speak for their employers or the SSP.

In addition to contributing their blog posts, a number of the Chefs have represented the blog as featured speakers at scholarly communications conferences, including the SSP Annual Meeting, the Association of Learned and Professional Society Publishers Annual Meeting, the International Association of Scientific, Technical, and Medical Publishers (STM) Frankfurt Conference, and the European Association of Science Editors (EASE)/International Society of Managing and Technical Editors (ISMTE) joint meeting.

==== Podcast ====
In 2013, Chef Stewart Wills launched the Scholarly Kitchen Podcast, with assistance from the American Association for the Advancement of Science. The podcast features interviews with individuals in scholarly communications.

=== Learned Publishing ===
Learned Publishing is a journal published by the Association of Learned and Professional Society Publishers in collaboration with SSP. Learned Publishing's readers are "not-for-profit and commercial publishers worldwide and members of other professions involved with scholarly publishing – librarians, academic authors and teachers, and subscription agents – as well as printers and other suppliers of services to book and journal publishers." SSP appoints the North American Editor of Learned Publishing.

== Resources ==
SSP maintains a library of presentations from past events from 2009 to the present. SSP makes an online directory of members and services available to its members. The SSP website contains information for students and professionals considering a career in scholarly publishing as well as information about publishing and library programs. An active Job Board lists career opportunities within the industry.

== Governance ==
SSP is a volunteer-led organization governed by an unpaid board of directors and committees. All volunteers must be SSP members in good standing. The organization has a full-time executive director, a part-time program director and contracts with a professional management company for accounting, meeting planning, database management, and other services.

== Lawsuit threat ==
In March of 2013, Edwin Mellen Press threatened to sue SSP for material critical of the press hosted on Scholarly Kitchen. The blog posts in question were temporarily removed and the threats published. As Kent Anderson, editor-in-chief at the time explained, "the feeling was that the best way to respond to the threats was to comply with them but also show people what the threats were." Later, the posts were reinstated by the SSP board.
