= Beall's List =

Defunct website listing predatory open-access publishers and journals

Beall's List was a list of predatory open-access publishers that was maintained by University of Colorado Denver librarian Jeffrey Beall on his blog Scholarly Open Access. The list aimed to document open-access publishers who did not perform real peer review, effectively publishing any article as long as the authors pay the article processing charge. Originally started as a personal endeavor in 2008, Beall's List became a widely followed piece of work by the mid-2010s. The list was used by scientists to identify exploitative publishers and detect publisher spam.

The influence of Beall's List led some publishers on the list to threaten defamation lawsuits against Beall, as well as to lodge official complaints against Beall's work to the University of Colorado. In January 2017, Beall removed the list from his blog, scholarlyoa.com. Six months later, he published an article in the journal Biochemia Medica claiming that pressure from his employer led to the blog shutdown, although the university's official statement and a response by Beall's direct supervisor both disputed this account. The closure of Beall's List was cited by some as a loss of an important resource, and successors have set out to continue Beall's work.

== Early history ==
Beall first became interested in predatory open-access journals (a term he coined) in 2008, when he started to receive numerous requests from dubious journals to serve on their editorial boards. He said that he "immediately became fascinated because most of the e-mails contained numerous grammatical errors." Starting in 2008, he maintained a list of what he stated were "potential, possible, or probable predatory scholarly open-access publishers".

In 2011, Beall's list had 18 publishers on it; by December 29, 2016, this number had grown to 923. Many of the journals listed were not actively publishing or published very few papers each year.

The original list of 18 publishers published a total of 1,328 separate journals. Beall originally classified all but one of the publishers he reviewed as being predatory. A decade later, two of the original 18 had been acquired by reputable publishers, and three appeared to have gone out of business. The remaining 13 publishers had significantly increased the number of journals they were publishing, to a total of 1,650 individual journals (about 10% of the number of journals listed in Cabells' Predatory Reports in 2022), primarily due to the dramatic increase in the number of journals published by OMICS Publishing Group from 63 to 742.

== Criteria for inclusion ==
Beall considered multiple criteria before including a publisher or journal on his lists. Examples included:

- Two or more journals have the same editorial board.
- There is little or no geographical diversity among the editorial board members, especially for journals that claim to be international in scope or coverage.
- The publisher has no policies or practices for digital preservation, meaning that if the journal ceases operations, all of the content disappears from the internet.
- The publisher copy-proofs their PDFs, thus making it harder to check for plagiarism.
- The name of a journal is incongruent with the journal's mission.
- The publisher falsely claims to have its content indexed in legitimate abstracting and indexing services or claims that its content is indexed in resources that are not abstracting and indexing services.

== Reception ==
=== Legal threats ===
In February 2013, the open-access publisher Canadian Center for Science and Education sent a letter to Beall stating that Beall's inclusion of its company on his list of questionable open-access publishers amounted to defamation. The letter also stated that if Beall did not remove the company from his list, it would subject him to "civil action".

In 2013, the OMICS Publishing Group threatened to sue Beall for $1 billion for his "ridiculous, baseless, [and] impertinent" inclusion of it on his list, which "smacks of literal unprofessionalism and arrogance". An unedited sentence from the letter read: "Let us at the outset warn you that this is a very perilous journey for you and you will be completely exposing yourself to serious legal implications including criminal cases lunched against you in INDIA and USA." Beall responded that the letter was "poorly written and personally threatening" and expressed his opinion that the letter "is an attempt to detract from the enormity of OMICS's editorial practices". OMICS' lawyers stated that damages were being pursued under section 66A of India's Information Technology Act, 2000, which makes it illegal to use a computer to publish "any information that is grossly offensive or has menacing character" or to publish false information. The letter stated that three years in prison was a possible penalty, although a U.S. lawyer said that the threats seemed to be a "publicity stunt" that was meant to "intimidate".

=== Use in sting operations ===
==== Who's Afraid of Peer Review? ====
In 2013, Science correspondent John Bohannon submitted 304 fake scientific articles to various open access journals, many of which were from publishers on Beall's List. Among these publishers that completed the review process, 82% accepted the paper. Bohannon stated "the results show that Beall is good at spotting publishers with poor quality control". Beall stated that the results support his claim to be identifying "predatory" publishers. However, the remaining 18% of publishers identified by Beall as predatory rejected the fake paper, leading science communicator Phil Davis to state "That means that Beall is falsely accusing nearly one in five".

Notable publishing groups to pass this sting operation include PLoS One, Hindawi, and Frontiers Media. Frontiers Media would later be added to Beall's list in 2015, sparking a controversy that is credited as a major reason for Beall eventually retracting his list.

==== Anna O. Szust experiment ====
In 2015, four researchers created a fictitious sub-par scientist named Anna O. Szust (oszust is Polish for "fraud"), and applied on her behalf for an editor position to 360 scholarly journals. Szust's qualifications were dismal for the role of an editor; she had never published a single article and had no editorial experience. The books and book chapters listed on her CV were made-up, as were the publishing houses that allegedly published the books.

One-third of the journals to which Szust applied were sampled from Beall's List. Forty of these predatory journals accepted Szust as editor without any background vetting and often within days or even hours. By comparison, she received minimal to no positive response from the "control" journals which "must meet certain standards of quality, including ethical publishing practices". Among journals sampled from the Directory of Open Access Journals (DOAJ), 8 of 120 accepted Szust. The DOAJ later removed some of the affected journals in a 2016 purge. None of the 120 sampled journals listed in Journal Citation Reports (JCR) offered Szust the position.

The results of the experiment were published in Nature in March 2017, and widely presented in the press.

=== Criticism ===
The list's 82% accuracy rate in the Who's Afraid of Peer Review? sting operation led Phil Davis to state that "Beall is falsely accusing nearly one in five as being a 'potential, possible, or probable predatory scholarly open access publisher' on appearances alone." He wrote that Beall "should reconsider listing publishers on his 'predatory' list until he has evidence of wrongdoing. Being mislabeled as a 'potential, possible, or probable predatory publisher' by circumstantial evidence alone is like the sheriff of a Wild West town throwing a cowboy into jail just 'cuz he's a little funny lookin.' Civility requires due process."

Joseph Esposito wrote in The Scholarly Kitchen that he had been following some of Beall's work with "growing unease", and that Beall's "broader critique (really an assault) of Gold OA and those who advocate it" had "crossed the line".

City University of New York librarians Monica Berger and Jill Cirasella wrote that his views were biased against open-access journals from less economically developed countries. Berger and Cirasella argued that "imperfect English or a predominantly non-Western editorial board does not make a journal predatory". They stated that "the criteria he uses for his list are an excellent starting point for thinking about the hallmarks of predatory publishers and journals", and suggested that "given the fuzziness between low-quality and predatory publishers, whitelisting, or listing publishers and journals that have been vetted and verified as satisfying certain standards, may be a better solution than blacklisting." However, for researchers in developing countries, the list has also been described as having been particularly important, as a result of lower access to institutional support for guidance on predatory publishers.

Rick Anderson, associate dean in the J. Willard Marriott Library, University of Utah, challenged the term "predatory open access publishing" itself: "what do we mean when we say 'predatory,' and is that term even still useful?... This question has become relevant because of that common refrain heard among Beall's critics: that he only examines one kind of predation—the kind that naturally crops up in the context of author-pays OA." Anderson suggested that the term "predatory" be retired in the context of scholarly publishing: "It's a nice, attention-grabbing word, but I'm not sure it's helpfully descriptive... it generates more heat than light." In its place, he proposed the term "deceptive publishing".

Beall's List primarily assessed the predatory journals based on their compliance with procedural standards, even though the quality of a journal can be judged on at least six different dimensions. A 2020 review in BMC Medicine found that only 3% of "predatory checklists" found online met their study's criteria for being "evidence-based"; Beall's List was not amongst them. A 2021 study in The Journal of Academic Librarianship confirmed Beall's bias against OA journals.

== Removal ==
On January 15, 2017, the entire content of Beall's Scholarly Open Access website was removed, along with Beall's faculty page on the University of Colorado's website. The removal was first noticed on social media, with speculation on whether the removal was due to migration of the list to the stewardship of Cabell's International. The company later denied any relationship, and its vice president of business development declared that Beall "was forced to shut down blog due to threats and politics". The University of Colorado declared that the decision to take down the list was a personal decision from Beall. Beall later wrote that he had taken down his blog because of pressure from the University of Colorado, which threatened his job security.

Beall's supervisor, Shea Swauger, wrote that the university had supported Beall's work and had not threatened his academic freedom. A demand by Frontiers Media to open a research misconduct case against Beall, to which the University of Colorado acquiesced, is reported as the immediate reason for Beall to take down the list. The university's investigation was closed with no findings. In an interview in 2018, Beall stated that "my university began to attack me in several ways. They launched a research misconduct investigation against me (after seven months, the result of the investigation was that no misconduct had occurred). They also put an unqualified, mendacious supervisor over me, and he constantly attacked and harassed me. I decided I could no longer safely publish the list with my university threatening me in these ways." Beall has not reactivated the list.

== Successors ==
Since Beall's List closed, similar lists have been started by others, including CSIR-Structural Engineering Research Centre, and an anonymous group at Stop Predatory Journals. Cabell's International, a company that offers scholarly publishing analytics and other scholarly services, has also offered both a black list and a white list for subscription on their website. Since 2021, the Norwegian Scientific Index includes the category "level X" that includes journals suspected of being predatory; its establishment was linked to expressions of concern regarding the publisher MDPI. A site entitled Beall's List of Potential Predatory Journals and Publishers states that it includes the original list as at 15 January 2017, with updates listed separately, maintained by an anonymous European postdoctoral researcher.

== See also ==
- Journalology
