= Predatory publishing =

Fraudulent business model for scientific publications

"Think. Check. Submit." poster by an international initiative to help researchers avoid predatory publishing

Predatory publishing, also known as write-only publishing or deceptive publishing, is the usage of exploitative and fraudulent publishing models by academic journals and publishers where they prioritize financial or reputational gain over the advancement of scholarship. It is characterized by misleading or false information about editorial practices, a deviation from standard peer-review procedures, lack of transparency, and the use of aggressive or coercive solicitation tactics to attract authors. Predatory publishers often exploit the pressures on researchers to publish, undermining the integrity and credibility of scholarly communication.

The phenomenon of "open-access predatory publishers" was first noticed by Jeffrey Beall around 2012, when he described "publishers that are ready to publish any article for payment". However, criticisms about the label "predatory" have been raised. A lengthy review of the controversy started by Beall appears in The Journal of Academic Librarianship.

Predatory publishers are so regarded because scholars are tricked into publishing with them, although some authors may be aware that the journal is poor quality or even fraudulent but publish in them anyway. (Note: Gina Kolata (The New York Times, 30 October 2017): "These publications often are called predatory journals, on the assumption that well-meaning academics are duped into working with them – tricked by flattering emails from the journals inviting them to submit a paper or fooled by a name that sounded like a journal they knew. "But it's increasingly clear that many academics know exactly what they're getting into, which explains why these journals have proliferated despite wide criticism. The relationship is less predator and prey, some experts say, than a new and ugly symbiosis.") Articles published in predatory journals receive far fewer citations than articles published in reputable journals, with most receiving no citations in the five years following publication. New scholars from developing countries are said to be especially at risk of being misled by predatory publishers. A 2022 report found that "nearly a quarter of the respondents from 112 countries, and across all disciplines and career stages, indicated that they had either published in a predatory journal, participated in a predatory conference, or did not know if they had. The majority of those who did so unknowingly cited a lack of awareness of predatory practices; whereas the majority of those who did so knowingly cited the need to advance their careers.

Actors seeking to maintain the scholarly ecosystem have sought to minimize the influence of predatory publishing through the use of blacklists such as Beall's List and Cabell's blacklist, as well as through whitelists such as the Directory of Open Access Journals. Nevertheless, identifying (and even providing a quantitative definition) of predatory journals remains difficult, because it is a spectrum rather than a binary phenomenon. In the same issue of a journal, it is possible to find articles which meet the highest criteria for scientific integrity, and articles that raise ethical concerns.

== History ==
In March 2008, Gunther Eysenbach, publisher of an early open-access journal, drew attention to what he called "black sheep among open-access publishers and journals" and highlighted in his blog publishers and journals which resorted to excessive spam to attract authors and editors, criticizing in particular Bentham Science Publishers, Dove Medical Press, and Libertas Academica. In July 2008, Richard Poynder's interview series brought attention to the practices of new publishers who were "better able to exploit the opportunities of the new environment". Doubts about honesty and scams in a subset of open-access journals continued to be raised in 2009.

Concerns for spamming practices from these journals prompted leading open-access publishers to create the Open Access Scholarly Publishers Association in 2008. In another early precedent, in 2009, the Improbable Research blog had found that Scientific Research Publishing's journals duplicated papers already published elsewhere; the case was subsequently reported in Nature. In 2010, Cornell University graduate student Phil Davis (editor of the Scholarly Kitchen blog) submitted a manuscript consisting of computer-generated nonsense (using SCIgen), which was accepted for a fee (but withdrawn by the author). Predatory publishers have been reported to hold submissions hostage, refusing to allow them to be withdrawn and thereby preventing submission in another journal.

Predatory publishing does not refer to a homogeneous category of practices. The name itself was coined by American librarian Jeffrey Beall who created a list of "deceptive and fraudulent" Open Access (OA) publishers, which was used as reference until withdrawn in 2017. The term has been reused since for a new for-profit database by Cabell's International. On the one hand, Beall's list as well as Cabell's International database do include truly fraudulent and deceptive OA publishers that pretend to provide services (in particular quality peer review) which they do not implement, show fictive editorial boards and/or ISSN numbers, use dubious marketing and spamming techniques, or even hijacking known titles. On the other hand, they also list journals with subpar standards of peer review and linguistic correction.

Studies using Beall's list, or his definitions, report an exponential growth in predatory journals since 2010. A 2020 study has found hundreds of scientists say they have reviewed papers for journals termed 'predatory' — although they might not know it. An analysis of the Publons has found that it hosts at least 6,000 records of reviews for more than 1,000 predatory journals. "The researchers who review most for these titles tend to be young, inexperienced and affiliated with institutions in low-income nations in Africa and the Middle East."

According to a 2020 study, 56% of articles published in predatory journals receive no citations over the five-year period following publication, compared to just 9% of articles published in reputable journals, suggesting that articles in predatory journals have little scientific impact.

The demonstration of unethical practices in the OA publishing industry has also attracted considerable media attention.

=== Bohannon's experiment ===
In 2013, John Bohannon, a staff writer for the journal Science and for popular science publications, tested the open-access system by submitting to a number of such journals a deeply flawed paper on the purported effect of a lichen constituent, and published the results in a paper called, "Who's Afraid of Peer Review?". About 60% of those journals, including journals of Elsevier, SAGE, Wolters Kluwer (through its subsidiary Medknow), and several universities, accepted the faked medical paper. PLOS ONE and Hindawi rejected it.

=== Anna O. Szust experiment ===
In 2015, four researchers created a fictitious sub-par scientist named Anna O. Szust (oszust is Polish for "fraudster"), and applied on her behalf for an editor position to 360 scholarly journals. Szust's qualifications were dismal for the role of an editor; she had never published a single article and had no editorial experience. The books and book chapters listed on her CV were made-up, as were the publishing houses that published the books.

One-third of the journals to which Szust applied were sampled from Beall's List of predatory journals. Forty of these predatory journals accepted Szust as editor without any background vetting and often within days or even hours. By comparison, she received minimal to no positive response from the "control" journals which "must meet certain standards of quality, including ethical publishing practices". Among journals sampled from the Directory of Open Access Journals (DOAJ), 8 of 120 accepted Szust. The DOAJ later removed some of the affected journals in a 2016 purge. Of the 120 sampled journals listed in Journal Citation Reports (JCR), none of them offered Szust the position.

The results of the experiment were published in Nature in March 2017, and widely presented in the press.

=== SCIgen experiments ===
SCIgen, a computer program that randomly generates academic computer science papers using context-free grammar, has generated papers that have been accepted by a number of predatory journals as well as predatory conferences.

=== Federal Trade Commission vs. OMICS Group, Inc. ===
On 25 August 2016, the United States Federal Trade Commission (FTC) filed a lawsuit against iMedPub, Conference Series, their parent company OMICS Publishing Group, and the company's president Srinubabu Gedela. In the lawsuit, the defendants are accused of "deceiving academics and researchers about the nature of its publications and hiding publication fees ranging from hundreds to thousands of dollars". The FTC was also responding to pressure to take action against predatory publishers. Attorneys for OMICS published a response on their website, claiming "your FTC allegations are baseless. Further we understand that FTC working towards favoring some subscription based journals publishers who are earring [sic] Billions of dollars rom [sic] scientists literature", suggesting that corporations in the scientific publishing business were behind the allegations. In March 2019, the FTC won the suit in a summary judgement and was awarded $50,130,811 in damages and a broad injunction against OMICS Group's practices. It is unlikely that the FTC will ever collect the award, as the rulings of US courts are not enforceable in India, and because OMICS does not have property in the US.

== Characteristics ==
Recognizing common characteristics of predatory publishers can help to avoid them. Complaints that are associated with predatory open-access publishing include:

- Accepting articles quickly with little or no peer review or quality control, including hoax and nonsensical papers.
- Notifying academics of article fees only after papers are accepted.
- Accepting papers which are outside of the declared scope of the journal.
- Aggressively campaigning for academics to submit articles or serve on editorial boards.
- Listing academics as members of editorial boards without their permission, and not allowing academics to resign from editorial boards.
- Appointing fake academics to editorial boards.
- Mimicking the name or web site style of more established journals.
- Making misleading claims about the publishing operation, such as providing false locations.
- Using ISSNs improperly.
- Citing fake or non-existent impact factors.
- Boasting about being "indexed" by academic social networking sites (like ResearchGate) and standard identifiers (like ISSNs and DOIs) as if they were prestigious or reputable bibliographic databases.
- Favoritism and self-promotion in peer review.

Predatory publishers have also been compared to vanity presses.

=== Beall's criteria ===
In 2015, Jeffrey Beall used 26 criteria related to poor journal standards and practices, 9 related to journal editors and staff members, 7 related to ethics and integrity, 6 related to the publisher's business practices, and 6 'other' general criteria related to publishers. He also listed 26 additional practices, which were 'reflective of poor journal standards' which were not necessarily indicative of predatory behaviour.

=== Eriksson and Helgesson's 25 criteria ===
In 2016, researchers Stefan Eriksson and Gert Helgesson identified 25 signs of predatory publishing. They warn that a journal will not necessarily be predatory if they meet one of the criteria, "but the more points on the list that apply to the journal at hand, the more sceptical you should be." The full list is quoted below:

1. The publisher is not a member of any recognized professional organisation committed to best publishing practices (like COPE or EASE)
2. The journal is not indexed in well-established electronic databases (like MEDLINE or Web of Science)
3. The publisher claims to be a "leading publisher" even though it just got started
4. The journal and the publisher are unfamiliar to you and all your colleagues
5. The papers of the journal are of poor research quality, and may not be academic at all (for instance allowing for obvious pseudo-science)
6. There are fundamental errors in the titles and abstracts, or frequent and repeated typographical or factual errors throughout the published papers
7. The journal website is not professional
8. The journal website does not present an editorial board or gives insufficient detail on names and affiliations
9. The journal website does not reveal the journal's editorial office location or uses an incorrect address
10. The publishing schedule is not clearly stated
11. The journal title claims a national affiliation that does not match its location (such as "American Journal of ..." while being located on another continent) or includes "International" in its title while having a single-country editorial board
12. The journal mimics another journal title or the website of said journal
13. The journal provides an impact factor in spite of the fact that the journal is new (which means that the impact cannot yet be calculated)
14. The journal claims an unrealistically high impact based on spurious alternative impact factors (such as 7 for a bioethics journal, which is far beyond the top notation)
15. The journal website posts non-related or non-academic advertisements
16. The publisher of the journal has released an overwhelmingly large suite of new journals at one occasion or during a very short period of time
17. The editor in chief of the journal is editor in chief also for other journals with widely different focus
18. The journal includes articles (very far) outside its stated scope
19. The journal sends you an unsolicited invitation to submit an article for publication, while making it blatantly clear that the editor has absolutely no idea about your field of expertise
20. Emails from the journal editor are written in poor language, include exaggerated flattering (everyone is a leading profile in the field), and make contradictory claims (such as "You have to respond within 48 h" while later on saying "You may submit your manuscript whenever you find convenient")
21. The journal charges a submission or handling fee, instead of a publication fee (which means that you have to pay even if the paper is not accepted for publication)
22. The types of submission/publication fees and what they amount to are not clearly stated on the journal's website
23. The journal gives unrealistic promises regarding the speed of the peer review process (hinting that the journal's peer review process is minimal or non-existent)—or boasts an equally unrealistic track-record
24. The journal does not describe copyright agreements clearly or demands the copyright of the paper while claiming to be an open-access journal
25. The journal displays no strategies for how to handle misconduct, conflicts of interest, or secure the archiving of articles when no longer in operation

=== Memon's criteria ===
Scholar Aamir Raoof Memon proposed the following criteria of predatory publishing:

1. The scope is too broad or inconsistent, e.g., it covers both biomedical and non-biomedical topics, irrespective of the title of the journal. They publish special issues on topics that are clearly outside the scope of the journal.
2. They accept all submitted papers and pretend to have a peer review process.
3. They are not affiliated with any reputable organization or university.
4. The published papers are of poor quality because they have never been peer-reviewed or edited. In most of the cases, they publish a large number of papers per issue.
5. They invite researchers to submit manuscripts with expertise in fields that are clearly outside the scope of the journal.
6. They state false or misleading information about their indexing service(s) and/or are indexed in irrelevant agencies or not indexed in relevant databases.
7. They falsify the information about their impact factors or similar metrics. Most of these journals claim to have an impact factor, despite being too new to have one.
8. They state false or misleading information about its editorial board.
9. They state false or misleading information about the costs involved in publishing with them or authors are surprised to discover hidden fees.
10. They are not monitored by or member of a regional or international organization.
11. They have no information about the strategy for handling misconduct (such as plagiarism, salami slicing, or a retraction policy).
12. The website is either not up-to-date or lacks important information about submission requirements and manuscript processing and reviewing.
13. The manuscripts are submitted through the email of the journal or directly on the journal's website.
14. They do not usually mention the contact details. There is also false or misleading information about the location of the journal.

=== Policies of leading scholar databases ===
Many scientific abstract and citation databases implemented policies to identify and combat predatory journals. For example, Scopus automatically flags a journal that is an outlier in two consecutive years according to any of three criteria comparing it with peer journals in its subject field

- Substantially higher self-citation rate
- Substantially lower number of citations
- Substantially lower CiteScore

Web of Science implemented somewhat similar criteria, although they do not specify any quantitative metrics. Also, Web of Science (unlike Scopus) checks for excessive citations of the works authored by the journal board members.

As of summer 2024 SciFinder (and Chemical Abstract Service) do not have a publicly disclosed policy on predatory journals.

=== Growth and structure ===
A study in 2015 found that predatory journals rapidly increased their publication volumes from 53,000 in 2010 to an estimated 420,000 articles in 2014, published by around 8,000 active journals. Early on, publishers with more than 100 journals dominated the market, but since 2012 publishers in the 10–99 journal size category have captured the largest market share. As of 2022, almost one third of the 100 largest publishers (by journal count) could be deemed predatory. The regional distribution of both the publisher's country and authorship is highly skewed, with three-quarters of the authors from Asia or Africa. Authors paid an average fee of US $178 each for articles to be published rapidly without review, typically within two to three months of submission. As reported in 2019, some 5% of Italian researchers have published in predatory journals, with a third of those journals engaging in fraudulent editorial practices.

== Causes and impact ==
The root cause of exploitative practices is the author-facing article-processing charge (APC) business model, in which authors are charged to publish rather than to read. Such a model provides incentives for publishers to focus on the quantity of articles published, rather than their quality. APCs have gained increasing popularity in the last two decades as a business model for OA, due to the guaranteed revenue streams they offer, as well as a lack of competitive pricing within the OA market, which allows vendors full control over how much they choose to charge.

Ultimately, quality control relies on good editorial policies and their enforcement, and the conflict between rigorous scholarship and profit can be successfully managed by selecting which articles are published purely based on (peer-reviewed) methodological quality. Most OA publishers ensure their quality by registering their titles in the Directory of Open Access Journals and complying with a standardised set of conditions.

The majority of predatory OA publishers appear to be based in Asia and Africa, but in one study over half of authors publishing in them were found to be from "higher-income or upper-middle-income countries". It has been argued that authors who publish in predatory journals may do so unwittingly without actual unethical perspective, due to concerns that North American and European journals might be prejudiced against scholars from non-Western countries, high publication pressure or lack of research proficiency. Hence predatory publishing also questions the geopolitical and commercial context of scholarly knowledge production. Early career researchers are particularly vulnerable to predatory publishing, as they often face pressure to publish quickly to establish their academic careers. This, coupled with a lack of awareness of predatory practices, makes them more susceptible to exploitative publishers. Nigerian researchers, for example, publish in predatory journals due to the pressure to publish internationally while having little to no access to Western international journals, or due to the often higher APCs practiced by mainstream OA journals. More generally, the criteria adopted by high JIF journals, including the quality of the English language, the composition of the editorial board or the rigour of the peer review process itself tend to favour familiar content from the "centre" rather than the "periphery". It is thus important to distinguish between exploitative publishers and journals – whether OA or not – and legitimate OA initiatives with varying standards in digital publishing, but which may improve and disseminate epistemic contents.

== Response ==
=== Blacklists ===
Lists of journals or publishers deemed either acceptable or unacceptable have been published. Beall's List was an example of a free blacklist, and Cabells' Predatory Reports is an example of a paid blacklist database. The Committee on Publication Ethics (COPE) recommends against blindly trusting any list of fake or predatory journals, especially if they do not publish the criteria by which journals are evaluated. Some lists of purported predatory publishers have been criticized for being based on the authors' personal judgement, rather than objective evidence.

Lists of acceptable sources, on the other hand, have been criticized as not being relevant to how academics evaluate journals. Directory of Open Access Journals is an example of a free whitelist. Other lists of pre-approved journals are available from large research funders.

==== Beall's List ====
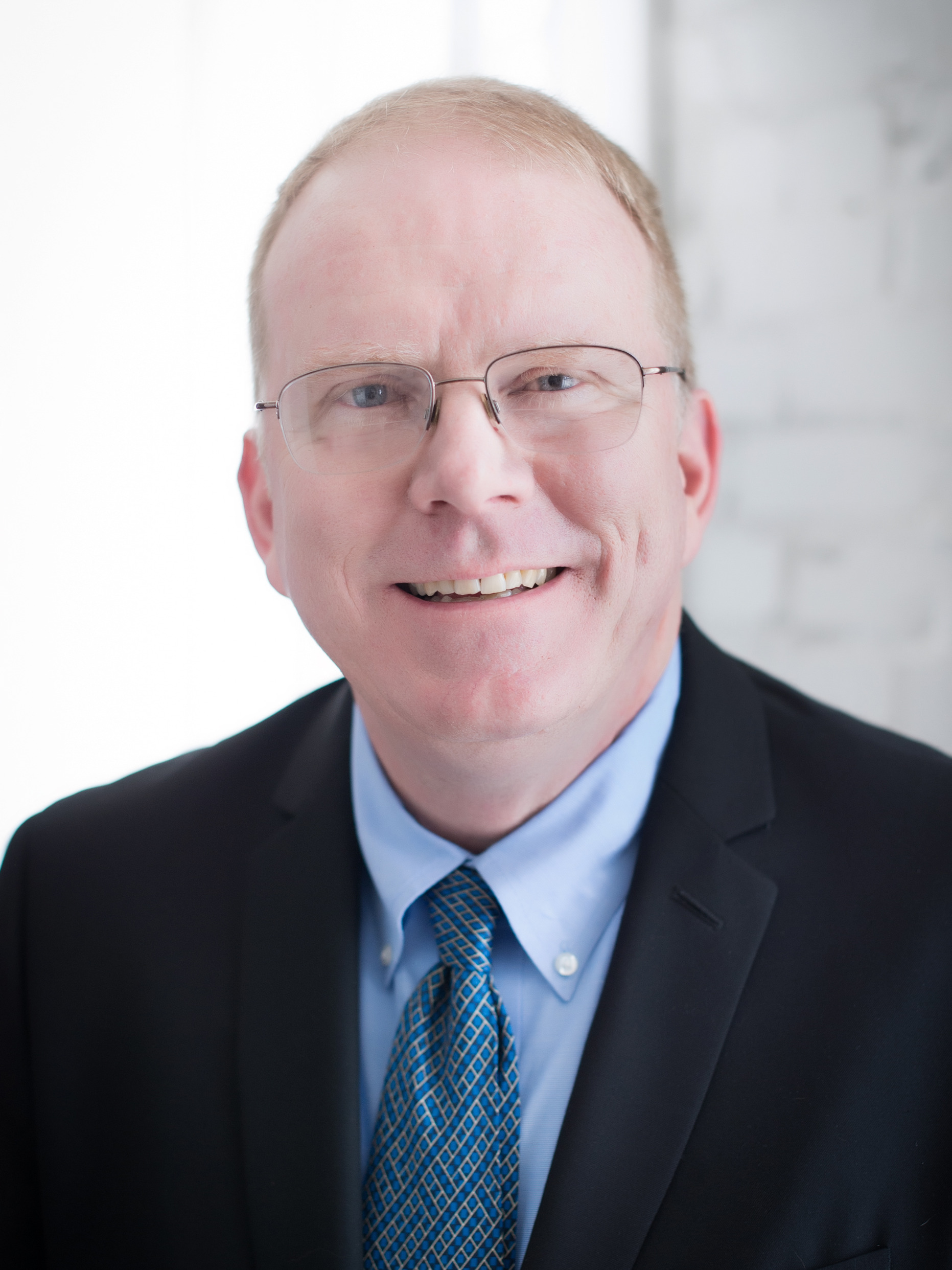
Jeffrey Beall

University of Colorado Denver librarian and researcher Jeffrey Beall, who coined the term "predatory publishing", first published his list of predatory publishers in 2010. Beall's list of potential, possible, or probable predatory scholarly open-access publishers attempted to identify scholarly open-access publishers with questionable practices. In 2013, Nature reported that Beall's list and web site were "widely read by librarians, researchers, and open-access advocates, many of whom applaud his efforts to reveal shady publishing practices." Others have raised the objection that "(w)hether it's fair to classify all these journals and publishers as 'predatory' is an open question—several shades of gray may be distinguishable."

Beall's analyses have been called sweeping generalizations with no supporting evidence, and he has also been criticized for being biased against open-access journals from less economically developed countries. A 2018 study has shown that Beall's criteria of "predatory" publishing were in no way limited to OA publishers and that, applying them to both OA and non-OA journals in the field of library and information science, even top tier non-OA journals could be qualified as predatory. Similarly, another study reported on the difficulties of demarcating predatory and non-predatory journals in biomedicine. One librarian wrote that Beall's list "attempts a binary division of this complex gold rush: the good and the bad. Yet many of the criteria used are either impossible to quantify..., or can be found to apply as often to established OA journals as to the new entrants in this area... Some of the criteria seem to make First World assumptions that aren't valid worldwide." Beall differed with these opinions and wrote a letter of rebuttal in mid-2015.

Following the Who's Afraid of Peer Review? investigation, the DOAJ has tightened up its inclusion criteria, with the purpose of serving as a whitelist, very much like Beall's has been a blacklist. The investigation found that "the results show that Beall is good at spotting publishers with poor quality control." However, the managing director of DOAJ, Lars Bjørnshauge, estimates that questionable publishing probably accounts for fewer than 1% of all author-pays, open-access papers, a proportion far lower than Beall's estimate of 5–10%. Instead of relying on blacklists, Bjørnshauge argues that open-access associations such as the DOAJ and the Open Access Scholarly Publishers Association should adopt more responsibility for policing publishers: they should lay out a set of criteria that publishers and journals must comply with to win a place on a 'white list' indicating that they are trustworthy.

Beall has been threatened with a lawsuit by a Canadian publisher which appears on the list. He reports that he has been the subject of online harassment for his work on the subject. His list has been criticized for relying heavily on analysis of publishers' web sites, not engaging directly with publishers, and including newly founded but legitimate journals. Beall has responded to these complaints by posting the criteria he uses to generate the list, as well as instituting an anonymous three-person review body to which publishers can appeal to be removed from the list. For example, a 2010 re-evaluation resulted in some journals being removed from Beall's list.

In 2013, the OMICS Publishing Group threatened to sue Beall for $1 billion for his "ridiculous, baseless, [and] impertinent" inclusion of them on his list, which "smacks of literal unprofessionalism and arrogance". An unedited sentence from the letter read: "Let us at the outset warn you that this is a very perilous journey for you and you will be completely exposing yourself to serious legal implications including criminal cases lunched [sic] against you in INDIA and USA." Beall responded that the letter was "poorly written and personally threatening" and expressed his opinion that the letter "is an attempt to detract from the enormity of OMICS's editorial practices". OMICS' lawyers stated that damages were being pursued under section 66A of India's Information Technology Act, 2000, which makes it illegal to use a computer to publish "any information that is grossly offensive or has menacing character" or to publish false information. The letter stated that three years in prison was a possible penalty, although a U.S. lawyer said that the threats seemed to be a "publicity stunt" that was meant to "intimidate". Section 66A has been criticised in an India Today editorial for its potential for misuse in "stifling political dissent, crushing speech and ... enabling bullying". Beall could have been sued for defamation, and would not have been able to fall back on truth as a final defense; under section 66A, the truth of any information is irrelevant if it is grossly offensive.

In an unrelated case in 2015, Section 66A was struck down by the Supreme Court of India, which found that it had no proximate connection to public order, "arbitrarily, excessively and disproportionately invades the right of free speech", and that the description of offences is "open-ended, undefined and vague." As such, it is not possible for the OMICS Group to proceed against Beall under section 66A, but it could mount a defamation case. Finally, in August 2016, OMICS was sued for "deceptive business practices related to journal publishing and scientific conferences" by the Federal Trade Commission (a US government agency), who won an initial court ruling in November 2017.

Beall's list was used as an authoritative source by South Africa's Department of Higher Education and Training in maintaining its list of accredited journals: articles published in those journals will determine funding levels for their authors; however, journals identified as predatory will be removed from this list. ProQuest is reviewing all journals on Beall's list, and has started removing them from the International Bibliography of the Social Sciences.

In January 2017, Beall shut down his blog and removed all its content, citing pressure from his employer. Beall's supervisor wrote a response stating that he did not pressure Beall to discontinue his work, or threaten his employment; and had tried hard to support Beall's academic freedom.

In 2017, Ramzi Hakami reported on his own successful attempt to get an intentionally poor paper accepted by a publisher on the list and referenced a resurrected version of Beall's list. This version includes Beall's original list and updates by an anonymous purported "postdoctoral researcher in one of the [E]uropean universities [who has] a hands-on experience with predatory journals."

==== Cabells' Predatory Reports ====
At the May 2017 meeting of the Society for Scholarly Publishing, Cabell's International, a company that offers scholarly publishing analytics and other scholarly services, announced that it intended to launch a blacklist of predatory journals (not publishers) in June, and said that access would be by subscription only. The company had started work on its blacklist criteria in early 2016. In July 2017, both a black list and a white list were offered for subscription on their website.

==== Other blacklists ====
Since Beall's list closed, other list groups have started. These include Kscien's list, which used Beall's list as a starting point, updating it to add and remove publishers.

In 2020, the Ministry of Science and Technology of China ordered the Chinese Center of Scientometrics to launch a blacklist called Chinese Early Warning Journal List (EWJL). EWJL classifies journals into three grades: low, medium, or high risk, rather than two (predatory or not) like most other lists. Nevertheless, there is an ongoing criticism of this list as well.

According to a 2020 systematic review of 93 lists, only three were assessed as evidence-based according to the authors' criteria.

=== Science funders ===
Multiple science funders have taken special measures against predatory publishing, especially in terms of national journal rankings.

==== Poland ====
On 18 September 2018, Zbigniew Błocki, the director of the National Science Centre, the largest agency that funds fundamental research in Poland, stated that if articles financed by NCN funds were published in journals not satisfying standards for peer review, then the grant numbers would have to be removed from the publications and funds would have to be returned to the NCN.

==== Russia ====
Both the Russian Science Foundation and the Russian Foundation for Basic Research require their grant recipients to publish only in the journals included into either Web of Science or Scopus databases. This policy aims at (1) preventing the researchers from falling into the traps of predatory publishers, without having the Foundations to issue their own lists of acceptable journals; (2) making sure that the results of their funded works are readily discovered by other people, as Web of Science and Scopus are subscribed to by most reputable institutions. However, in parallel with the withdrawal of Clarivate from Russia in 2022 and the pause in Elsevier services from 2022 onwards, the Web of Science and Scopus listings are no longer considered as essential by the Russian agencies.

=== Other efforts ===
Campaign Think. Check. Submit.

More transparent peer review, such as open peer review and post-publication peer review, has been advocated to combat predatory journals. Others have argued instead that the discussion on predatory journals should not be turned "into a debate over the shortcomings of peer review—it is nothing of the sort. It is about fraud, deception, and irresponsibility..."

In an effort to "set apart legitimate journals and publishers from non-legitimate ones", principles of transparency and best practice have been identified and issued collectively by the Committee on Publication Ethics, the DOAJ, the Open Access Scholarly Publishers Association, and the World Association of Medical Editors. Various journal review websites (crowd-sourced or expert-run) have been started, some focusing on the quality of the peer review process and extending to non-OA publications. A group of libraries and publishers launched an awareness campaign.

A number of measures have been suggested to further combat predatory journals. Others have called on research institutions to improve the publication literacy notably among junior researchers in developing countries. Some organisations have also developed criteria in which predatory publishers could be spotted through providing tips.

As Beall has ascribed predatory publishing to a consequence of gold open access (particularly its author-pays variant), one researcher has argued for platinum open access, where the absence of article processing charges removes the publisher's conflict of interest in accepting article submissions. More objective discriminating metrics have been proposed, such as a "predatory score" and positive and negative journal quality indicators. The International Academy of Nursing Editors (INANE) have encouraged authors to consult subject-area expert-reviewed journal listings, such as the Directory of Nursing Journals, vetted by their organisation, and to make use of Jeffrey Beall's open-access list of predatory journals.

Bioethicist Arthur Caplan has warned that predatory publishing, fabricated data, and academic plagiarism erodes public confidence in the medical profession, devalues legitimate science, and undermines public support for evidence-based policy.

In 2015, Rick Anderson, associate dean at the J. Willard Marriott Library, University of Utah, challenged the term itself: "what do we mean when we say 'predatory,' and is that term even still useful?... This question has become relevant because of that common refrain heard among Beall's critics: that he only examines one kind of predation—the kind that naturally crops up in the context of author-pays OA." Anderson suggests that the term "predatory" be retired in the context of scholarly publishing. "It's a nice, attention-grabbing word, but I'm not sure it's helpfully descriptive... it generates more heat than light." A 2017 article in The New York Times suggests that a significant number of academics are "eager" to publish their work in these journals, making the relationship more a "new and ugly symbiosis" than a case of scholars being exploited by "predators".

Similarly, a study published in January 2018 found that "Scholars in the developing world felt that reputable Western journals might be prejudiced against them and sometimes felt more comfortable publishing in journals from the developing world. Other scholars were unaware of the reputation of the journals in which they published and would not have selected them had they known. However, some scholars said they would still have published in the same journals if their institution recognised them. The pressure to 'publish or perish' was another factor influencing many scholars' decisions to publish in these fast-turnaround journals. In some cases, researchers did not have adequate guidance and felt they lacked the knowledge of research to submit to a more reputable journal."

In May 2018, the University Grants Commission in India removed 4,305 dubious journals from a list of publications used for evaluating academic performance.

To further define and distinguish predatory journals, Leonhard Dobusch and Maximilian Heimstädt in 2019 proposed a tripartite classification of Open Access journals with below-average peer review quality. Based on their procedures, there would be 1) "aspirant" 2) "junk" and 3) "fake" journals. While aspirant journals are science-oriented despite their below-average peer review (e.g. student-run journals), junk and fake journals are predominantly or exclusively profit-oriented. Junk and fake Open Access journals have superficial or no peer review procedures, despite their claims of being peer-reviewed.

In April 2019, 43 participants from 10 countries met in Ottawa, Canada to formulate a consensus definition: "Predatory journals and publishers are entities that prioritize self-interest at the expense of scholarship and are characterized by false or misleading information, deviation from best editorial and publication practices, a lack of transparency, and/or the use of aggressive and indiscriminate solicitation practices." Adequacy of peer review was not included in the definition because this factor was deemed too subjective to evaluate. Critics of this definition argued that excluding the quality of peer review from the definition "could strengthen rather than weaken" predatory journals.

In March 2022, the InterAcademy Partnership published a report, Combatting Predatory Academic Journals and Conferences, with a series of recommendations. This study emphasized, that predatory publishing practices is not a binary (good or bad) phenomenon, but rather a spectrum. They proposed the following classification:

a) hijacked journals, which mimic existing reputable journals;
b) journals which re-publish papers from legitimate journals (see OMICS);
c) journals which deceive their potential authors by "giving false or misleading information about their publishing charges, the services they provide (like indexing, peer-review, or having an impact factor), where the publisher is based, or the identity of the owner, editor or members of the editorial board."
d) low-quality journals, which are characterised by poor cumulative criteria (such as disregarding negative reviews of manuscripts and publishing articles outside the declared journal's scope), without an apparent deceitful intent (see MDPI and Frontiers Media).

Some journals can be simultaneously classified into two or more categories.

== See also ==
- List of scholarly publishing stings
- Author mill
- Conflicts of interest in academic publishing (covers publishers' COIs)
- Content farm
- Diploma mill
- Elsevier § Fake journals
- Essay mill
- Hijacked journal
- Journalology
- Mega journal
- Open-access journal
- Peer review failures
- Predatory conference
- Pseudo-scholarship
- Research Integrity Risk Index
- Center for Promoting Ideas
