= Jeffrey Beall =

American librarian

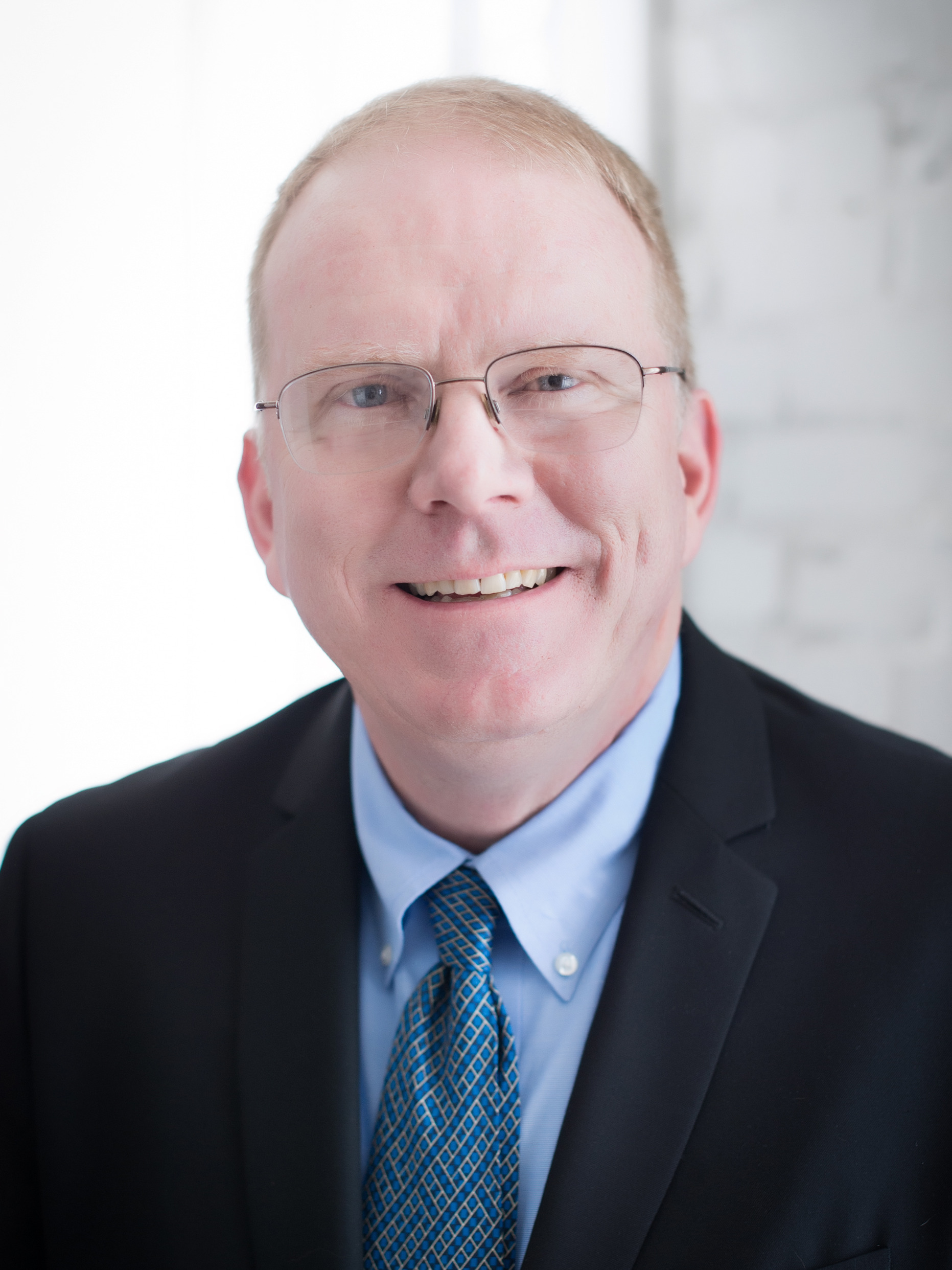
- Beall in 2005
- Education: California State University, Northridge, Oklahoma State University, University of North Carolina
- Occupation: Librarian
- Known for: Criticism of predatory open access publishing

Jeffrey Beall is an American librarian and library scientist who drew attention to "predatory open access publishing", a term he coined, and created Beall's list, a list of potentially predatory open-access publishers.

He is a critic of the open access publishing movement and particularly how predatory publishers use the open access concept. Known for his blog Scholarly Open Access, he has also written on this topic in The Charleston Advisor, in Nature, in Learned Publishing, and elsewhere.

When Beall created his list, he was employed as a librarian and associate professor at the University of Colorado Denver. More recently, he was a librarian at Auraria Library in Denver. He retired in 2018.

== Education and career ==
Beall has a bachelor's degree in Spanish from California State University, Northridge (1982), as well as an MA in English from Oklahoma State University (1987) and an MS in library science from the University of North Carolina (1990). Until December 2012, he served on the editorial board of Cataloging & Classification Quarterly. In that same year, Beall was awarded tenure by the University of Colorado Denver and promoted to associate professor. In an interview with The Charleston Advisor in July 2013, he said that his biggest influence was Fred Kilgour.

== Criticism of open access publishing ==
Beall classifies open access (OA) publishers as following a "gold model" in which authors pay for their work to be published and a "platinum model" in which they do not pay, and sees the gold model as being prone to abuse. He has argued that "the act of instituting financial transactions between scholarly authors and scholarly publishers is corrupting scholarly communication. This was one of the great benefits of the traditional scholarly publishing system – it had no monetary component in the relationship between publishers and their authors. Adding the monetary component has created the problem of predatory publishers and the problem of financing author fees."

In a June 2012 interview, Beall said that while he supported what he called "platinum open-access", he concluded: "The only truly successful model that I have seen is the traditional publishing model."

In December 2013, Beall published a comment in tripleC, an open access journal, in which he articulated his criticism of open access publishing advocates. He noted that the quality of articles published in many OA journals is low, that peer review in many OA journals is negligible or non-existent, that public access to poor-quality articles harms the public, and that the careers of young scholars who publish in poor-quality OA journals are harmed. He portrayed the open access movement as an anti-corporatist movement whose advocates pursue the goal of "kill[ing] off the for-profit publishers and mak[ing] scholarly publishing a cooperative and socialistic enterprise" while ignoring the benefits of traditional academic publishers, including consistent peer review and attention to the long-term preservation of articles they publish. He has also been critical of the Directory of Open Access Journals for relying on data supplied by journal publishers to determine whether the journal in question should be included in the directory.

Beall provided an overview of the history of predatory publishing, his involvement with the issue, and a summary and reiteration of most of the above criticisms in an article published in June 2017.

=== Predatory open access publishing ===
Beall is well known for his investigations of predatory open access publishing, a term he coined. He has published a number of analyses of predatory OA journals, such as one of Bentham Open in The Charleston Advisor in 2009. However, his interest in such journals began when, in 2008, he started to receive numerous requests from dubious journals to serve on their editorial boards. He has said that he "immediately became fascinated because most of the e-mails contained numerous grammatical errors". Since 2008, he has maintained a well-known and regularly updated list of what he states are "potential, possible, or probable predatory scholarly open-access publishers". In 2011, Beall's list had 18 publishers on it; by December 29, 2016, this number had grown to 923. Beall established a Scholarly Open Access Appeals Board, which operated between 2013 and 2016. Composed of four independent reviewers, the board enabled a process whereby publishers could appeal their inclusion on Beall's list. The process involved a blind review by advisory board members who would study each publisher's appeal and make recommendations to Beall as to whether the appeal should be upheld or rejected. Beall has estimated that predatory open access journals publish about 5–10 percent of all open access articles, and that at least 25 percent of open access journals are predatory. He has been particularly critical of OMICS Publishing Group, which he described as "the worst of the worst" in a 2016 Inside Higher Education article.

=== Predatory meetings ===
Beall coined the term "predatory meetings" for a new activity of OMICS and others in organizing scientific conferences claiming editorial boards and organizing committees with prominent academics who have not agreed to participate, with high fees for attendance, and with poor reviewing standards for acceptance. Deceptively similar names to existing reputable conferences are also used. Beall has criticised the financial arrangements for OMICS conferences, noting that the "registration policy shows that they never grant refunds for registration fees – even if they themselves cancel or postpone the conference. Instead, they grant a credit for other OMICS conferences." He also recommends, "in the strongest terms possible, that all scholars from all countries avoid doing business in any way with the OMICS Group. Do not submit papers. Do not agree to serve on their editorial boards. Do not register for or attend their conferences." He notes a profusion of such conferences located in Asia and identified features of these predatory meetings.

=== Beall's list and the Science sting ===
In 2013, Science published the results of a sting operation in which a scientifically flawed spoof publication was submitted to open access publications. Many accepted the manuscript, and a disproportionate number of the accepting journals were on Beall's list. The publication, entitled Who's Afraid of Peer Review?, concluded that Beall is "good at spotting publishers with poor quality control". Of publishers on his list that completed the review process, it was accepted by 82%. Beall remarked that the author of the sting, John Bohannon, "basically found what I've been saying for years".

=== Counter-criticism ===
Phil Davis, in an analysis of the Who's Afraid of Peer Review? sting operation, observed that "Beall is falsely accusing nearly one in five as being a 'potential, possible, or probable predatory scholarly open access publisher' on appearances alone." He continued to say that Beall "should reconsider listing publishers on his 'predatory' list until he has evidence of wrongdoing. Being mislabeled as a 'potential, possible, or probable predatory publisher' by circumstantial evidence alone is like the sheriff of a Wild West town throwing a cowboy into jail just 'cuz he's a little funny lookin.' Civility requires due process."

Joseph Esposito wrote in The Scholarly Kitchen that he had been following some of Beall's work with "growing unease" and that Beall's "broader critique (really an assault) of Gold OA and those who advocate it" had "crossed the line".

Wayne Bivens-Tatum, librarian at Princeton University, published a rebuttal in tripleC, regarding Beall's criticisms of open access publishing. He stated that Beall's "rhetoric provides good examples of what Albert O. Hirschman called the 'rhetoric of reaction'", and concluded Beall's "argument fails because the sweeping generalizations with no supporting evidence render it unsound".

City University of New York librarians Monica Berger and Jill Cirasella said his views are biased against open-access journals from less economically developed countries. Berger and Cirasella argued that "imperfect English or a predominantly non-Western editorial board does not make a journal predatory". While recognizing that "the criteria he uses for his list are an excellent starting point for thinking about the hallmarks of predatory publishers and journals", they suggest that, "given the fuzziness between low-quality and predatory publishers, whitelisting, or listing publishers and journals that have been vetted and verified as satisfying certain standards, may be a better solution than blacklisting."

One major journal whitelist is the Directory of Open Access Journals; Lars Bjørnshauge, its managing director, estimated that questionable publishing probably accounts for fewer than 1% of all author-pays, open-access papers, a proportion far lower than Beall's estimate of 5–10%. Instead of relying on blacklists, Bjørnshauge argues that open-access associations such as the DOAJ and the Open Access Scholarly Publishers Association should adopt more responsibility for policing publishers: they should lay out a set of criteria that publishers and journals must comply with to win a place on a whitelist, indicating that they are trustworthy.

Rick Anderson, associate dean in the J. Willard Marriott Library, University of Utah, challenged the term "predatory open access publishing" itself: "what do we mean when we say 'predatory,' and is that term even still useful?... This question has become relevant because of that common refrain heard among Beall's critics: that he only examines one kind of predation—the kind that naturally crops up in the context of author-pays OA." Anderson suggested that the term "predatory" be retired in the context of scholarly publishing. "It's a nice, attention-grabbing word, but I'm not sure it's helpfully descriptive… it generates more heat than light." In its place, he proposed the term "deceptive publishing".

=== Website removal ===
On 15 January 2017, the entire content of the Scholarly Open Access website was removed, along with Beall's faculty page on the University of Colorado's website. The removal was first noticed on social media, with speculation on whether the removal was due to migration of the list to Cabell's International, a library services company that had been working with Beall on its own journal blacklist. The company later denied any connection of the closure with its project; its vice president of business development declared that Beall "was forced to shut down blog due to threats and politics". The University of Colorado also declared that the decision to take down the list was a personal decision from Beall. Beall later wrote that he had taken down his blog because of pressure from the University of Colorado, which threatened his job security. Beall's supervisor, Shea Swauger, wrote that the university had supported Beall's work and had not threatened his academic freedom. A demand by Frontiers Media to open a research misconduct case against Beall, to which the University of Colorado acquiesced, is reported as the immediate reason for Beall to take down the list. The university's investigation was closed with no findings.

In an interview in 2018, Beall stated that "my university began to attack me in several ways. They launched a research misconduct investigation against me (after seven months, the result of the investigation was that no misconduct had occurred). They also put an unqualified, mendacious supervisor over me, and he constantly attacked and harassed me. I decided I could no longer safely publish the list with my university threatening me in these ways."

After the website was taken down, medical researcher Roger Pierson of the University of Saskatchewan said, "To see Beall's work disappear would be an absolute disaster," adding, "From an academic perspective, this represents the absence of an extremely important resource."

Subsequently, an anonymous person created an archive of Beall's work on lists of predatory publishers and journals.

== Legal threats ==
In February 2013, the open-access publisher Canadian Center for Science and Education sent a letter to Beall stating that Beall's inclusion of their company on his list of questionable open-access publishers amounted to defamation. The letter also stated that if Beall did not remove this company from his list, they would subject him to "civil action".

In May 2013, OMICS Publishing Group, which had also been included on Beall's list of predatory open access publishers, issued a warning to Beall in a poorly-written letter stating that they intended to sue him, and were seeking $1 billion in damages under section 66A of India's Information Technology Act, 2000. However, section 66A was struck down as unconstitutional by the Supreme Court of India in an unrelated case in 2015. In 2016, Beall welcomed news that the U.S. Federal Trade Commission had filed a lawsuit in Federal District Court against the OMICS group. The complaint was the first against an academic publisher and alleged that the defendants had been "deceiving academics and researchers about the nature of its publications and hiding publication fees ranging from hundreds to thousands of dollars", holding manuscripts hostage by seeking fees to allow them to be withdrawn, and promoting predatory conferences; Inside Higher Education reports that Beall has published examples of these sorts of activities by OMICS, and he has previously said of the organization: "If anything is predatory, it's that publisher. It's the worst of the worst." OMICS's attorneys have described the allegations as baseless. In November 2017, a federal court in the District of Nevada granted a preliminary injunction that

"prohibits the defendants from making misrepresentations regarding their academic journals and conferences, including that specific persons are editors of their journals or have agreed to participate in their conferences. It also prohibits the defendants from falsely representing that their journals engage in peer review, that their journals are included in any academic journal indexing service, or any measurement of the extent to which their journals are cited. It also requires that the defendants clearly and conspicuously disclose all costs associated with submitting or publishing articles in their journals."
