= List of Hindawi academic journals =

This is a list of academic journals published by Hindawi.

== A ==
- Abstract and Applied Analysis
- Active and Passive Electronic Components
- Adsorption Science and Technology
- Advances in Acoustics and Vibration
- Advances in Agriculture
- Advances in Astronomy
- Advances in Bioinformatics
- Advances in Biology
- Advances in Cell and Gene Therapy
- Advances in Chemistry
- Advances in Civil Engineering
- Advances in Condensed Matter Physics
- Advances in Decision Sciences
- Advances in Ecology
- Advances in Fuzzy Systems
- Advances in Geriatrics
- Advances in Hematology
- Advances in Hepatology
- Advances in High Energy Physics
- Advances in Human-Computer Interaction
- Advances in Materials Science and Engineering
- Advances in Mathematical Physics
- Advances in Medicine
- Advances in Meteorology
- Advances in Molecular Biology
- Advances in Multimedia
- Advances in Neuroscience
- Advances in Operations Research
- Advances in OptoElectronics
- Advances in Orthopedics
- Advances in Pharmacological Sciences
- Advances in Pharmacological and Pharmaceutical Sciences
- Advances in Physical Chemistry
- Advances in Polymer Technology
- Advances in Preventive Medicine
- Advances in Public Health
- Advances in Radiology
- Advances in Software Engineering
- Advances in Statistics
- Advances in Tribology
- Advances in Urology
- Advances in Virology
- AIDS Research and Treatment
- Analytical Cellular Pathology
- Anatomy Research International
- Anemia
- Anesthesiology Research and Practice
- Applied and Environmental Soil Science
- Applied Bionics and Biomechanics
- Applied Computational Intelligence and Soft Computing
- Aquaculture Nutrition
- Archaea
- Arthritis
- Autism Research and Treatment
- Autoimmune Diseases

== B ==
- Behavioural Neurology
- Biochemistry Research International
- Bioinorganic Chemistry and Applications
- BioMed Research International
- Bone Marrow Research
- The Breast Journal

== C ==
- Canadian Journal of Gastroenterology and Hepatology
- Canadian Journal of Infectious Diseases and Medical Microbiology
- Canadian Respiratory Journal
- Cardiology Research and Practice
- Case Reports in Anesthesiology
- Case Reports in Cardiology
- Case Reports in Critical Care
- Case Reports in Dentistry
- Case Reports in Dermatological Medicine
- Case Reports in Emergency Medicine
- Case Reports in Endocrinology
- Case Reports in Gastrointestinal Medicine
- Case Reports in Genetics
- Case Reports in Hematology
- Case Reports in Hepatology
- Case Reports in Immunology
- Case Reports in Infectious Diseases
- Case Reports in Medicine
- Case Reports in Nephrology
- Case Reports in Neurological Medicine
- Case Reports in Obstetrics and Gynecology
- Case Reports in Oncological Medicine
- Case Reports in Ophthalmological Medicine
- Case Reports in Orthopedics
- Case Reports in Otolaryngology
- Case Reports in Pathology
- Case Reports in Pediatrics
- Case Reports in Psychiatry
- Case Reports in Pulmonology
- Case Reports in Radiology
- Case Reports in Rheumatology
- Case Reports in Surgery
- Case Reports in Transplantation
- Case Reports in Urology
- Case Reports in Vascular Medicine
- Case Reports in Veterinary Medicine
- Chemotherapy Research and Practice
- Child Development Research
- Cholesterol
- Complexity
- Computational and Mathematical Methods in Medicine
- Computational Intelligence and Neuroscience
- Contrast Media & Molecular Imaging
- Critical Care Research and Practice
- Current Gerontology and Geriatrics Research

== D ==
- Depression Research and Treatment
- Dermatology Research and Practice
- Diagnostic and Therapeutic Endoscopy
- Discrete Dynamics in Nature and Society
- Disease Markers

== E ==
- Education Research International
- Emergency Medicine International
- Enzyme Research
- Evidence-Based Complementary and Alternative Medicine

== G ==
- Gastroenterology Research and Practice
- GastroHep
- Genetics Research
- Genetics Research International
- Geofluids
- Geography Journal
- Global Health, Epidemiology, and Genomics

== H ==
- Heteroatom Chemistry
- HPB Surgery
- Human Behavior and Emerging Technologies

== I ==
- Infectious Diseases in Obstetrics and Gynecology
- Interdisciplinary Perspectives on Infectious Diseases
- International Journal of Aerospace Engineering
- International Journal of Agronomy
- International Journal of Alzheimer's Disease
- International Journal of Analysis
- International Journal of Analytical Chemistry
- International Journal of Antennas and Propagation
- International Journal of Biodiversity
- International Journal of Biomaterials
- International Journal of Biomedical Imaging
- International Journal of Breast Cancer
- International Journal of Cell Biology
- International Journal of Chemical Engineering
- International Journal of Chronic Diseases
- International Journal of Computer Games Technology
- International Journal of Corrosion
- International Journal of Dentistry
- International Journal of Differential Equations
- International Journal of Digital Multimedia Broadcasting
- International Journal of Ecology
- International Journal of Electrochemistry
- International Journal of Endocrinology
- International Journal of Engineering Mathematics
- International Journal of Food Science
- International Journal of Forestry Research
- International Journal of Genomics
- International Journal of Geophysics
- International Journal of Hepatology
- International Journal of Hypertension
- International Journal of Inflammation
- International Journal of Mathematics and Mathematical Sciences
- International Journal of Medicinal Chemistry
- International Journal of Microbiology
- International Journal of Navigation and Observation
- International Journal of Nephrology
- International Journal of Optics
- International Journal of Otolaryngology
- International Journal of Pediatrics
- International Journal of Photoenergy
- International Journal of Plant Genomics
- International Journal of Polymer Science
- International Journal of Reconfigurable Computing
- International Journal of Reproductive Medicine
- International Journal of RF and Microwave Computer-Aided Engineering
- International Journal of Rheumatology
- International Journal of Rotating Machinery
- International Journal of Spectroscopy
- International Journal of Stochastic Analysis
- International Journal of Surgical Oncology
- International Journal of Telemedicine and Applications
- International Journal of Vascular Medicine
- International Journal of Zoology
- International Scholarly Research Notices
  - ISRN Addiction
  - ISRN Agronomy
  - ISRN AIDS
  - ISRN Allergy
  - ISRN Analytical Chemistry
  - ISRN Anatomy
  - ISRN Applied Mathematics
  - ISRN Astronomy and Astrophysics
  - ISRN Biochemistry
  - ISRN Biomaterials
  - ISRN Biomathematics
  - ISRN Biotechnology
  - ISRN Botany
  - ISRN Cardiology
  - ISRN Cell Biology
  - ISRN Ceramics
  - ISRN Civil Engineering
  - ISRN Condensed Matter Physics
  - ISRN Dentistry
  - ISRN Dermatology
  - ISRN Economics
  - ISRN Education
  - ISRN Electronics
  - ISRN Emergency Medicine
  - ISRN Endocrinology
  - ISRN Environmental Chemistry
  - ISRN Evolutionary Biology
  - ISRN Gastroenterology
  - ISRN Genomics
  - ISRN Hematology
  - ISRN Industrial Engineering
  - ISRN Infectious Diseases
  - ISRN Materials Science
  - ISRN Mathematical Physics
  - ISRN Mechanical Engineering
  - ISRN Meteorology
  - ISRN Microbiology
  - ISRN Nanotechnology
  - ISRN Nephrology
  - ISRN Neurology
  - ISRN Neuroscience
  - ISRN Nursing
  - ISRN Nutrition
  - ISRN Obesity
  - ISRN Obstetrics and Gynecology
  - ISRN Oncology
  - ISRN Ophthalmology
  - ISRN Otolaryngology
  - ISRN Pediatrics
  - ISRN Pharmacology
  - ISRN Physiology
  - ISRN Probability and Statistics
  - ISRN Psychiatry
  - ISRN Public Health
  - ISRN Radiology
  - ISRN Rehabilitation
  - ISRN Renewable Energy
  - ISRN Rheumatology
  - ISRN Robotics
  - ISRN Signal Processing
  - ISRN Software Engineering
  - ISRN Structural Biology
  - ISRN Surgery
  - ISRN Thermodynamics
  - ISRN Toxicology
  - ISRN Urology
  - ISRN Veterinary Science
  - ISRN Virology
  - ISRN Zoology

== J ==
- Journal of Addiction
- Journal of Advanced Transportation
- Journal of Aging Research
- Journal of Analytical Methods in Chemistry
- Journal of Anthropology
- Journal of Applied Mathematics
- Journal of Astrophysics
- Journal of Biomedical Education
- Journal of Botany
- Journal of Cancer Epidemiology
- Journal of Chemistry
- Journal of Combustion
- Journal of Complex Analysis
- Journal of Computer Networks and Communications
- Journal of Control Science and Engineering
- Journal of Diabetes Research
- Journal of Drug Delivery
- Journal of Electrical and Computer Engineering
- Journal of Energy
- Journal of Engineering
- Journal of Environmental and Public Health
- Journal of Food Quality
- Journal of Function Spaces
- Journal of Healthcare Engineering
- Journal of Immunology Research
- Journal of Insects
- Journal of Interventional Cardiology
- Journal of Lipids
- Journal of Marine Biology
- Journal of Marine Sciences
- Journal of Materials
- Journal of Mathematics
- Journal of Nanomaterials
- Journal of Nanotechnology
- Journal of Nucleic Acids
- Journal of Nutrition and Metabolism
- Journal of Obesity
- Journal of Oncology
- Journal of Ophthalmology
- Journal of Optimization
- Journal of Osteoporosis
- Journal of Parasitology Research
- Journal of Pathogens
- Journal of Pharmaceutics
- Journal of Pregnancy
- Journal of Probability and Statistics
- Journal of Renewable Energy
- Journal of Robotics
- Journal of Sensors
- Journal of Skin Cancer
- Journal of Smoking Cessation
- Journal of Solar Energy
- Journal of Spectroscopy
- Journal of Sports Medicine
- Journal of the Renin-Angiotension-Aldosterone System
- Journal of Theoretical Social Psychology
- Journal of Thyroid Research
- Journal of Toxicology
- Journal of Transplantation
- Journal of Tropical Medicine
- Journal of Veterinary Medicine
- Journal of Zoological Systematics and Evolutionary Research

== L ==
- Laser and Particle Beams

== M ==
- Malaria Research and Treatment
- Mathematical Problems in Engineering
- Mediators of Inflammation
- Minimally Invasive Surgery
- Mobile Information Systems
- Modelling and Simulation in Engineering
- Molecular Imaging
- Multiple Sclerosis International

== N ==
- Neural Plasticity
- Neurology Research International
- Neuroscience Journal
- Nursing Research and Practice

== O ==
- Obstetrics and Gynecology International
- Occupational Therapy International
- Oxidative Medicine and Cellular Longevity

== P ==
- Pain Research & Management
- Pain Research and Treatment
- Paleontology Journal
- Parkinson's Disease
- Pathology Research International
- Plastic Surgery International
- Physical Separation in Science and Engineering
- Polymer Crystallization
- PPAR Research
- Prostate Cancer
- Psyche: A Journal of Entomology
- Psychiatry Journal
- Pulmonary Medicine

== Q ==
- Quantum Engineering

== R ==
- Radiology Research and Practice
- Rehabilitation Research and Practice
- Research Letters in Physics

== S ==
- Sarcoma
- Scanning
- Schizophrenia Research and Treatment
- Science and Technology of Nuclear Installations
- Scientific Programming
- Scientifica
- The Scientific World Journal
- Security and Communication Networks
- Shock and Vibration
- Sleep Disorders
- Stem Cells International
- Stroke Research and Treatment
- Surgery Research and Practice

== T ==
- Translational Sports Medicine
- Tuberculosis Research and Treatment
- Thrombosis

== U ==
- Ulcers

== V ==
- Veterinary Medicine International
- VLSI Design

== W ==
- Wireless Communications and Mobile Computing
- Wireless Power Transfer
