= Kuo-Chen Chou =

Chinese-American biophysicist

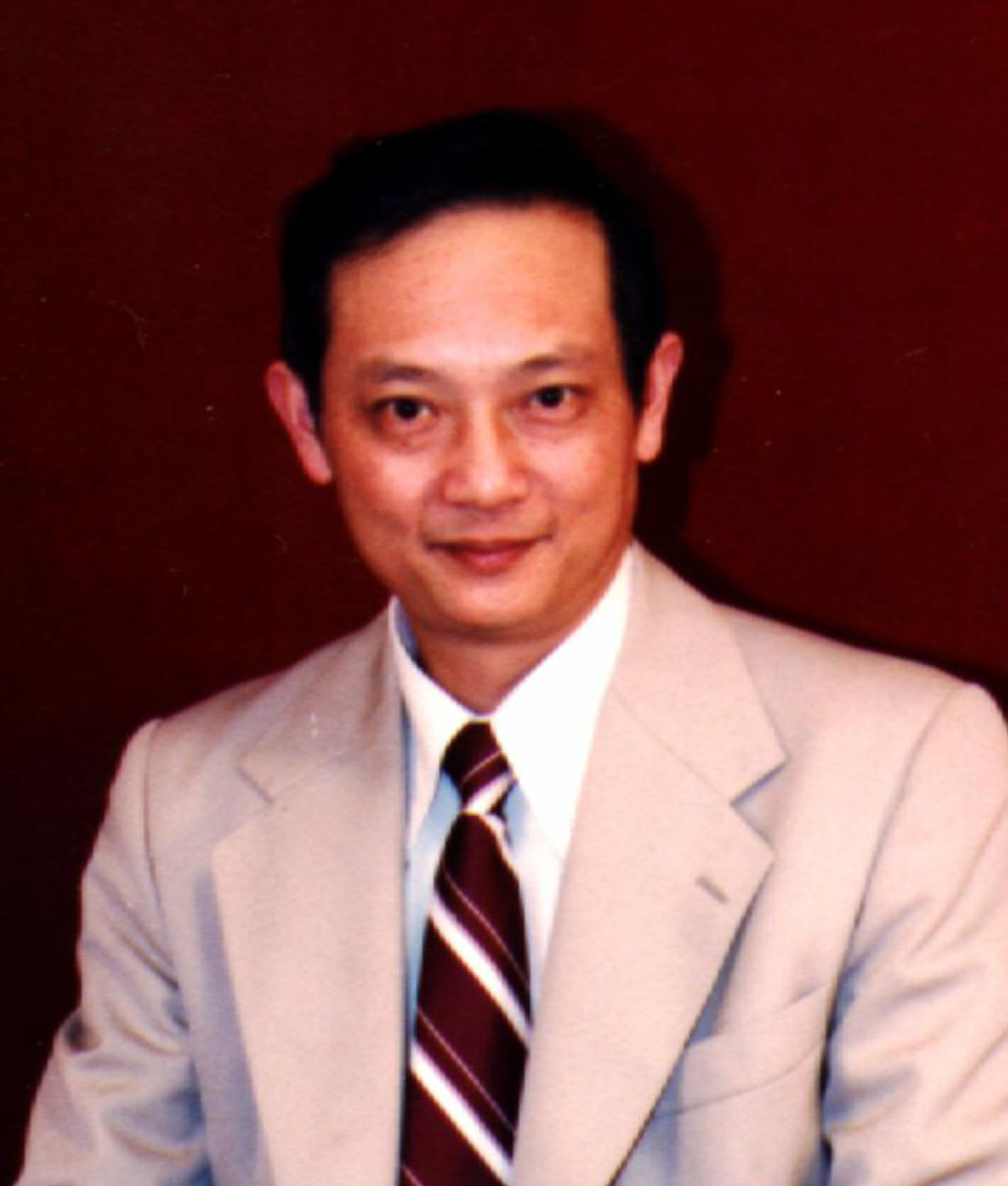
- Kuo-Chen Chou probably in 1985
- Born: August 14, 1938; Guangdong, China
- Died: July 5, 2021 (aged 82)
- Education: Nanjing University; Kyoto University
- Scientific career
- Fields: Biophysics; Bioinformatics
- Workplaces: Gordon Life Science Institute
- Thesis: Low-Frequency Motions of Protein Molecules (1984)
- Website: gordonlifescience.org

Kuo-Chen Chou (周国城; August 14, 1938–July 5, 2021) was a Chinese-American biophysicist and bioinformatician who founded the Gordon Life Science Institute, a non-profit research organization in Boston, Massachusetts. Among other contributions, he developed pseudo amino acid composition (PseAAC), used in computational biology for proteomics analysis and pseudo K-tuple nucleotide composition (PseKNC) for genome analysis. He is the father of James Chou.

In 2020, it was revealed that Chou had been removed from the editorial board of the Journal of Theoretical Biology and banned as a reviewer for the journal Bioinformatics for repeatedly manipulating the peer-review process to gain citations to his own papers. The editors of the Journal of Theoretical Biology referred to it as "scientific misconduct of the highest order".

== Research ==
In 1972, he and his co-workers, by taking into account the spatial factor and force field factor between the enzyme and its substrate, reported that the upper limit of diffusion-controlled reaction of enzyme or diffusion limited enzyme is one order of magnitude higher than the conventional estimation, and can be used to elucidate some surprisingly high reaction rates in molecular biology.

In 1977, he predicted the existence of low-frequency phonons in proteins, followed by developing the theory of low-frequency collective motion in proteins and DNA after it had been confirmed by Raman spectroscopy.

In 1995, he proposed and proved a theorem on invariance for addressing some problems often encountered in bioinformatics and cheminformatics.

In 1996, he proposed the distorted key theory for guiding how to design peptide drugs.

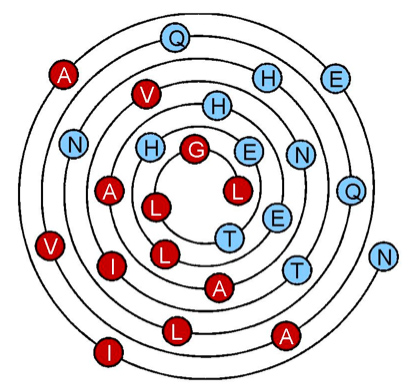
A wenxiang diagram

In 1997, he proposed the wenxiang diagram, a way to show residue properties on an alpha helix similar to a helical wheel.

In 2011, he proposed the 5-steps rule, that has been used for proteome and genome analyses as well as predicting posttranslational modification sites in protein, RNA, and DNA sequences.

As of December 2019, Chou had published over 720 scientific papers in enzyme kinetics, graphical methods in biology, protein structure prediction and function, low-frequency collective motion in macromolecules, proteome and genome analyses, and identification of posttranslational modification sites in biological sequences.

== Editorial roles ==
Chou served multiple editorial roles, including Editor-in-Chief (2008–2019) of The Open Bioinformatics Journal, and as a member of the editorial boards of the Journal of Theoretical Biology (2005–2019), the Journal of Biomedicine and Biotechnology (2008–2014), and The Open Biochemistry Journal (2007–2019), among others.

He was an Honorary Editor for The Open Bioinformatics Journal (2020–2021) and Associate Editor for Medicinal Chemistry (2004–2021).

== Recognition ==
Chou's papers have been widely cited. According to Web of Science, his h-index is 135. He has been continuously for five years (2014, 2015, 2016, 2017 and 2018) selected by Thomson Reuters and Clarivate Analytics as ISI Highly Cited Researcher. However, it is notable that many of Chou's citations may be from manipulation of the editorial and refereeing process, per below controversy.

== Editorial misconduct and citation abuse ==
In 2019, the journal Bioinformatics published an editorial detailing the actions of a reviewer who engaged in coercive citations. In 2020, the Journal of Theoretical Biology published a further editorial claiming that the same reviewer was on their editorial board and had also engaged in coercive citation malpractice, and had engaged in further breaches of scientific conduct. The journal Nature later revealed that the unnamed individual was Kuo-Chen Chou.
