= Journal of Veterinary Medicine =

Journal of Veterinary Medicine may refer to several publications:

- Journal of Veterinary Medicine (Hindawi journal) a journal published by Hindawi
- Journal of Veterinary Medicine, Series A, originally known as Zentralblatt für Veterinärmedizin Reihe A, now known as Transboundary and Emerging Diseases, published by Wiley
- Journal of Veterinary Medicine, Series B, originally known as Zentralblatt für Veterinärmedizin Reihe B, now known as Zoonoses and Public Health, published by Wiley
- Journal of Veterinary Medicine, Series C, originally known as Zentralblatt für Veterinärmedizin Reihe C, now known as Anatomia, Histologia, Embryologia, published by Wiley
