= BioTechniques =

- Discipline: Life sciences
- Language: English
- Edited by: Michelle S. Itano

Publication details
- History: 1983-present
- Publisher: Future Science Group
- Open access: Yes
- Impact factor: 1.993 (2020)

Standard abbreviations
- ISO 4: BioTechniques

Indexing
- ISSN: 0736-6205 (print); 1940-9818 (web)

Links
- Journal homepage

BioTechniques: the International Journal of Life Science Methods is a peer-reviewed open-access scientific journal published by Future Science Group. It covers laboratory methods and techniques that are of broad interest to professional life scientists, as well as scientists from other disciplines (e.g. physics, chemistry, engineering, computer sciences) interested in life science applications of their technologies. The journal was established in 1983 by Eaton Associates, which was acquired in 2001 by Informa. The journal was then acquired by Future Science Group in 2018. It is distributed in both print and online form.

The journal is supported by print and website advertising, and as of January 2019, began charging article processing fees to become a gold open access journal.

== Abstracting and indexing ==
The journal is abstracted and indexed in:

- Biological Abstracts
- BIOSIS Previews
- Current Contents/Life Sciences
- Index Medicus/PubMed/MEDLINE
- Science Citation Index Expanded
- Scopus
- Ulrich's Periodicals Directory

According to the Journal Citation Reports, the journal has a 2020 impact factor of 1.993.
