= Pharmacogenomics (journal) =

- Discipline: Pharmacogenomics
- Language: English
- Edited by: David Gurwitz, Howard McLeod, Munir Pirmohamed

Publication details
- History: 2000–present
- Publisher: Future Medicine Ltd
- Frequency: 18/year
- Impact factor: 2.350 (2016)

Standard abbreviations
- ISO 4: Pharmacogenomics

Indexing
- CODEN: PARMFL
- ISSN: 1462-2416 (print); 1744-8042 (web)
- OCLC no.: 55059877

Links
- Journal homepage

Pharmacogenomics is a peer-reviewed medical journal established in 2000 and published by Future Medicine. The editors-in-chief are David Gurwitz (Tel-Aviv University), Howard McLeod (University of North Carolina at Chapel Hill), and Munir Pirmohamed (University of Liverpool). The journal covers the field of pharmacogenomics.

== Abstracting and indexing ==
The journal is abstracted and indexed in Biological Abstracts, BIOSIS Previews, Biotechnology Citation Index, Chemical Abstracts, Current Contents/Life Sciences, EMBASE/Excerpta Medica, Index Medicus/MEDLINE/PubMed, Science Citation Index, and Scopus. According to the Journal Citation Reports, the journal has a 2016 impact factor of 2.350, ranking it 132nd out of 256 journals in the category "Pharmacology & Pharmacy".
