= ECAM =

ECAM may refer to:

- Electronic centralised aircraft monitor, a system that monitors aircraft functions and relays them to the pilots
- Evidence-Based Complementary and Alternative Medicine, a medical journal
- École Catholique des Arts et Métiers, an engineering school in Lyon, France
- ECAM Rennes - Louis de Broglie, an engineering school in Rennes, France
- The Madrid Film School (Escuela de Cinematografía y del Audiovisual de la Comunidad de Madrid), a film school in Madrid, Spain
