= Canadian Respiratory Journal =

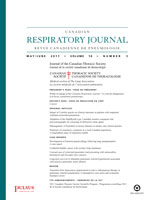
- Language: English, French
- Edited by: Peter Paré

Publication details
- History: 1994–present
- Publisher: Hindawi Publishing Corporation
- Frequency: Bimonthly
- Impact factor: 1.016 (2015)

Standard abbreviations
- ISO 4: Can. Respir. J.

Indexing
- ISSN: 1198-2241 (print); 1916-7245 (web)
- OCLC no.: 30899068

Links
- Journal homepage; Online archive

The Canadian Respiratory Journal is a bimonthly peer-reviewed medical journal. It publishes original research and news dealing with respiratory disease, sleep medicine, critical care, and thoracic surgery as well as continuing medical education and practice guidelines. It was the official journal of the Canadian Thoracic Society, the Canadian Critical Care Society and the Canadian Sleep Society from 1993 to January 1, 2016, however, its association with these organizations ended when it was purchased from its original publisher, the Pulsus Group by the Hindawi Publishing Corporation.
