= Epigenomics (journal) =

- Discipline: Epigenomics
- Language: English
- Edited by: James G. Herman, Jörg Tost

Publication details
- History: 2009–present
- Publisher: Future Medicine Ltd
- Frequency: Monthly
- Impact factor: 4.778 (2020)

Standard abbreviations
- ISO 4: Epigenomics

Indexing
- CODEN: EPIGC7
- ISSN: 1750-1911 (print); 1750-192X (web)
- OCLC no.: 746948365

Links
- Journal homepage

Epigenomics is a peer-reviewed medical journal established in 2009 and published by Future Medicine. The editors-in-chief are James G. Herman (University of Pittsburgh Cancer Institute) and Jörg Tost (Centre national de génotypage). The journal covers all aspects of research on epigenomics and epigenetics and their implications for diagnosis, prognosis and therapeutics.

== Abstracting and indexing ==
The journal is abstracted and indexed in EMBASE/Excerpta Medica, Index Medicus/MEDLINE/PubMed, Chemical Abstracts, BIOSIS Previews, Science Citation Index Expanded, and Scopus. According to the Journal Citation Reports, the journal has a 2017 impact factor of 4.979, ranking it 31st out of 166 journals in the category "Genetics & Heredity".
