= Regenerative Medicine (journal) =

- Discipline: Regenerative medicine
- Language: English

Publication details
- History: 2006–present
- Publisher: Future Medicine Ltd
- Frequency: 8/year
- Impact factor: 2.868 (2016)

Standard abbreviations
- ISO 4: Regen. Med.

Indexing
- CODEN: RMEECZ
- ISSN: 1746-0751 (print); 1746-076X (web)
- OCLC no.: 227191485

Links
- Journal homepage

Regenerative Medicine is a peer-reviewed medical journal covering stem cell research and regenerative medicine. It was established in 2006 and is published by Future Medicine. The editor-in-chief is Chris Mason (University College London).

Regenerative Medicine has an online sister community site called RegMedNet. RegMedNet is a free-to-join website that publishes news on regenerative medicine and cell therapy research, policy and business, editorials from leaders in the field and free educational webinars.

== Abstracting and indexing ==
The journal is abstracted and indexed in Biological Abstracts, BIOSIS Previews, Biotechnology Citation Index, Chemical Abstracts, EMBASE/Excerpta Medica, EMCare, Index Medicus/MEDLINE/PubMed, Science Citation Index Expanded, and Scopus. According to the Journal Citation Reports, the journal has a 2016 impact factor of 2.868, ranking it 15th out of 21 journals in the category "Cell & Tissue Engineering" and 23rd out of 77 journals in the category "Engineering, Biomedical".
