= Abba Gumel =

Professor of mathematics

Abba B. Gumel
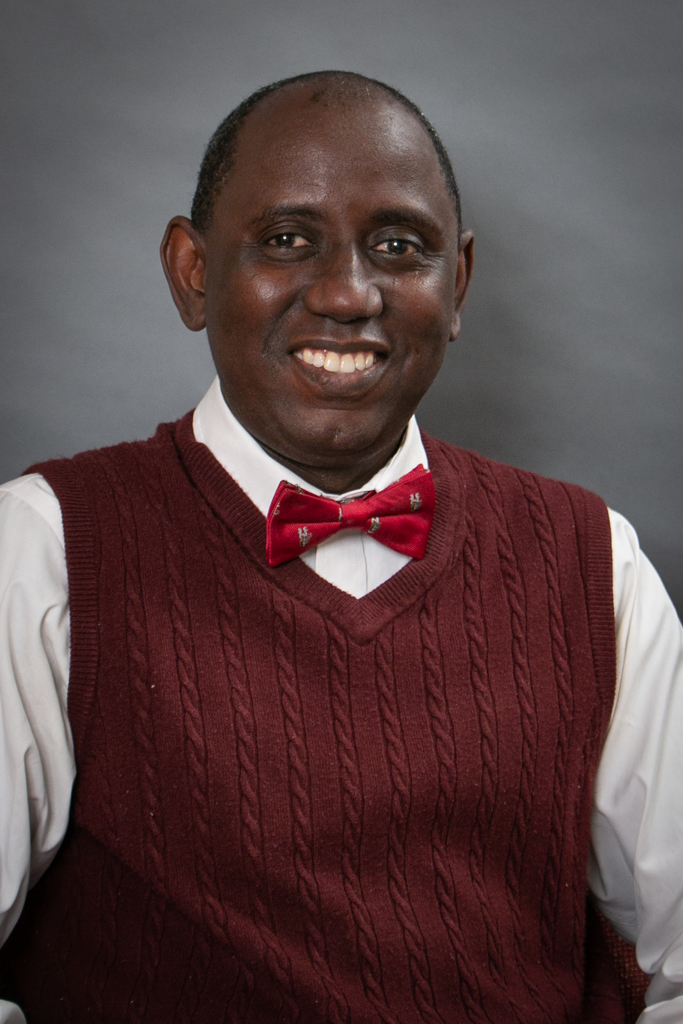
- Gumel in 2022
- Education: Brunel University of London (PhD)
- Occupations: Professor of Mathematics, University of Maryland
- Awards: Distinguished University Professor, 2025; Fellow, The World Academy of Sciences (TWAS), Class of 2024; Arthur Beaumont Distinguished Service Award, Canadian Applied and Industrial Mathematics Society (CAIMS); Fellow, American Association for the Advancement of Science (AAAS); Fellow, American Mathematical Society (AMS); Fellow, Society for Industrial and Applied Mathematics (SIAM); 2021 Bellman prize (with Kamaldeen Okuneye); Speaker, The AMS Einstein Public Lecture in Mathematics, 2021; Fellow, African Academy of Science; Fellow, Nigerian Academy of Science; Fellow, Nigerian Mathematical Society; Speaker, Einstein Public Lecture in Mathematics of the American Mathematical Society; Dr. Lindsay E. Nicolle Award for the best paper published in the Canadian Journal of Infectious Diseases and Medical Microbiology (2009)
- Scientific career
- Fields: Mathematical biology; Dynamical systems
- Website: math.umd.edu/~agumel/

Abba Gumel is a Distinguished University Professor and The Michael and Eugenia Brin Endowed E-Nnovate Chair in Mathematics at the Department of Mathematics, University of Maryland, College Park. His research, which spans three main areas of applied mathematics (namely, mathematical biology, dynamical systems and computational mathematics), is focused on the use of mathematical modeling and rigorous approaches, together with statistical analysis, to gain insight into the dynamics of real-life phenomena arising in the natural and engineering sciences. The main emphasis of Gumel's work is on the mathematical theory of epidemics – specifically, he uses mathematical theories and methodologies to gain insights into the qualitative behavior of nonlinear dynamical systems arising from the mathematical modelling of phenomena in the natural and engineering sciences, with emphasis on the transmission dynamics and control of emerging and re-emerging human (and other animal) infectious diseases of public health and socio-economic interest.

== Biography ==
Gumel was a Foundation Professor of Mathematics at the School of Mathematical and Statistical Sciences, Arizona State University, before becoming The Michael and Eugenia Brin Endowed E-Nnovate Chair in Mathematics at the Department of Mathematics, University of Maryland, College Park in 2022.

Gumel is an elected Fellow of The World Academy of Sciences (TWAS), American Mathematical Society (AMS), Society for Industrial Applied Mathematics (SIAM), American Association for the Advancement of Science (AAAS), African Academy of Sciences (AAS), Nigerian Academy of Science (NAS), and the African Scientific Institute (ASI).

In 2021, Gumel was chosen to give the AMS Einstein Public Lecture in Mathematics of the American Mathematical Society. Gumel was named Extraordinary Professor at the Department of Mathematics and Applied Mathematics, University of Pretoria (2015-2023) and adjunct professor at the Department of Applied Mathematics, University of Waterloo, Canada.

Gumel has written over 170 peer-reviewed research publications, four books (edited), and several book chapters.

== Books ==
- Mathematical and Computational Modeling of Phenomena Arising in Population Biology and Nonlinear Oscillations. Contemporary Mathematics Series, American Mathematical Society. Volume 793 (342 pages), 2024 (Abba B. Gumel, ed.).
- Mathematics of Continuous and Discrete Dynamical Systems. Contemporary Mathematics Series, American Mathematical Society. Volume 618 (310 Pages), 2014 (Abba B. Gumel, ed.).
- Modeling Paradigms and Analysis of Disease Transmission Models. DIMACS Series in Discrete Mathematics and Theoretical Computer Science. Volume 75. American Mathematical Society(268 Pages), 2010 (Abba B. Gumel and Suzanne Lenhart, eds.)
- Mathematical Studies on Human Disease Dynamics: Emerging Paradigms and Challenges. American Mathematical Society Contemporary Mathematics Series, Volume 410, (389 Pages), 2006 (Abba B. Gumel (Chief Editor), Carlos-Castillo-Chavez, Ronald E. Mickens and Dominic Clemence, eds.).

== Promotion of biomedical sciences in Nigeria ==
In 2014, Gumel became one of eight US-based scientists who signed a memorandum of understanding with seven Nigerian universities aimed at helping them build world-class capacity in biomedical sciences research and pedagogy.

== Awards and recognition ==
- Distinguished University Professor of Mathematics, 2025
- Elected Fellow of The World Academy of Sciences (TWAS), Class of 2024
- 2023 Arthur Beaumont Distinguished Service Award of the Canadian Applied and Industrial Mathematics Society (CAIMS). This award is in recognition of my ``outstanding service to CAIMS as Secretary, Director, and Chair of Membership, Publications and Doctoral Dissertation Awards Committees, as two-time organizer of the annual meeting, organizer of summer schools and workshops, for initiating and contributing to the creation of the Annual Meeting Handbook, and for being an exemplary ambassador for Canadian Applied Mathematics through multiple international recognitions and leadership in international development projects".
- Named to the 2022 class of Fellows of the American Association for the Advancement of Science, ``For distinguished contributions to mathematical biology, particularly the modeling and analysis of epidemics and other global public health challenges, and to the advancement of mathematics on the African continent"
- Named to the 2023 class of Fellows of the American Mathematical Society, "for contributions to the mathematical theory of epidemics, applied dynamical systems, and promoting the use of mathematics to help solve global public health challenges".
- Named to the 2022 class of Fellows of the Society for Industrial and Applied Mathematics, "for stellar contributions to mathematical biology, particularly the modeling of epidemics, and applications to other public health problems".
- Winner of 2021 Bellman Prize (with former student, Dr. Kamaldeen Okuneye)
- Selected to give The AMS Einstein Public Lecture in Mathematics (American Mathematical Society, March 2021)
- Appointed Founding Fellow, ASU-Santa Fe Institute Center for Biosocial Complex Systems (January 2015)
- Appointed Extraordinary Professor, Department of Mathematics and Applied Mathematics, University of Pretoria, South Africa (2015-2021)
- Merit Award for research excellence in 2011, given by the University of Manitoba and the University of Manitoba Faculty Association (given in May 2012). Eight awards are given each year, under the research category, throughout the campus
- Merit Award for research excellence in 2010, given by the University of Manitoba and the University of Manitoba Faculty Association (given in June 2011)
- Elected Fellow of the Nigerian Academy of Science (FAS): 2010
- Elected Fellow of the African Academy of Sciences (FAAS): 2009
- Received the 2009 Dr. Lindsay E. Nicolle Award for the best paper published in the Canadian Journal of Infectious Diseases and Medical Microbiology
