= Leonard Richmond Wheeler =

British educationalist

- Born: 23 July 1888; Highgate
- Died: 25 September 1948; Seaford
- Occupation(s): Educationalist, philosopher of biology

Leonard Richmond Wheeler (23 July 1888 – 25 September 1948) was a British educationalist and philosopher of biology who worked in British Malaya and the West Indies.

== Biography ==
Wheeler was born on 23 July 1888 in Highgate. He was educated at the University of London and obtained a post teaching mathematics and science at a grammar school in Antigua in 1912. During this time he collected and studied flora. He sent specimens to the British Museum and authored a paper "The Flora of Antigua" in the Journal of Botany in 1916.

He joined the Colonial Service in 1914 and returned to England to serve in World War I. In 1919, Wheeler authored Desert Musings, a collection of poems which has been cited as a rare example of a British West Indies Regiment Officer's poetic take on life at the Front. He was later a member of the Royal Flying Corps stationed in the Balkans. After the war he worked in Trinidad as a science teacher at Queen's Royal College until he was transferred to British Malaya in 1921. He worked as a school inspector and upon his retirement in 1938 was Inspector of Schools, Penang. He became a Fellow of the Linnean Society in 1939.

During his later life he lived in Seaford. Wheeler was married to Doris Milligan and had two sons. He died on 25 September 1948 in Seaford.

== Vitalism ==
In 1939, Wheeler authored the book Vitalism: Its History and Validity which was submitted for his PhD thesis at the University of London. He defined vitalism as "all the various doctrines which, from the time of Aristotle, have described things as actuated by some power or principle additional to mechanics and chemistry." The book is a scholarly history of vitalistic theories from the time of Aristotle to the twentieth century, and a defence of vitalism. A 1945 review in The Quarterly Review of Biology noted that "a great amount of painstaking scholarly research has gone into the making of his book, and the result will astonish those who have given only casual thought to the subject".

== Selected publications ==
- Desert Musings (1919)
- Scouting in the Tropics (1926)
- The Modern Malay (1928)
- Vitalism: Its History and Validity (1939)
- Harmony of Nature: A Study in Co-Operation for Existence (1947)
