= Future Microbiology =

- Discipline: Microbiology
- Language: English
- Edited by: Richard A. Calderone, Joseph M Blondeau

Publication details
- History: 2006–present
- Publisher: Future Medicine Ltd
- Frequency: 16/year
- Impact factor: 2.4 (2024)

Standard abbreviations
- ISO 4: Future Microbiol.

Indexing
- CODEN: FMUIAR
- ISSN: 1746-0913 (print); 1746-0921 (web)
- OCLC no.: 316181912

Links
- Journal homepage

Future Microbiology is a peer-reviewed medical journal that was established in 2006 and is published by Future Medicine. The editors-in-chief are Richard A. Calderone (Georgetown University) and Joseph M Blondeau (University of Saskatchewan). The journal covers all aspects of the microbiological sciences, including virology, bacteriology, parasitology, and mycology.

== Abstracting and indexing ==
The journal is abstracted and indexed in BIOSIS Previews, Biotechnology Citation Index, CAB Abstracts, Chemical Abstracts, Elsevier Biobase, EMBASE/Excerpta Medica, Index Medicus/MEDLINE/PubMed, Science Citation Index Expanded, and Scopus. According to the Journal Citation Reports, the journal has a 2024 impact factor of 2.4.
