= Imaging in Medicine =

- Discipline: Medical imaging
- Language: English

Publication details
- History: 2009-present
- Publisher: Pulsus Group
- Frequency: Quarterly
- Open access: Yes

Standard abbreviations
- ISO 4: Imaging Med.

Indexing
- CODEN: IMMECA
- ISSN: 1755-5191 (print); 1755-5205 (web)
- OCLC no.: 651888195

Links
- Journal homepage; Online access; Online archive

Imaging in Medicine is a quarterly peer-reviewed open access medical journal. It covers medical imaging, radiation therapy, radiology, and basic imaging and nuclear medicine. The journal was established in 2009 by Future Medicine. It is now published by Open Access Journals, an imprint of the Pulsus Group, on Jeffrey Beall's list of "Potential, possible, or probable" predatory open-access publishers after being acquired by the OMICS Publishing Group in 2016.

== Abstracting and indexing ==
The journal is abstracted and indexed in Chemical Abstracts Service, Embase, and from 2010 to 2014 and 2016 to 2017 in Scopus (discontinued).
