= Neuropsychiatry (journal) =

- Discipline: Neuropsychiatry
- Language: English

Publication details
- History: 2011–present
- Publisher: Pulsus Group
- Frequency: Quarterly
- Open access: Yes

Standard abbreviations
- ISO 4: Neuropsychiatry

Indexing
- ISSN: 1758-2008 (print); 1758-2016 (web)
- OCLC no.: 926167826

Links
- Journal homepage; Online access; Online archive

Neuropsychiatry is a quarterly peer-reviewed open access medical journal covering research on neuropsychiatry. The journal was established in 2011 and originally published by Future Medicine with Wayne Goodman and F. Markus Leweke (Central Institute of Mental Health, Mannheim, Germany) serving as its founding editors-in-chief up to 2015. Under the Future Science imprint, the journal's impact factor ranged from 0.486 to 1.456 (2012-2015). Since 2016 it is published by Pulsus Group via its openaccessjournals.com imprint, which is on Jeffrey Beall's list of "potential, possible, or probable predatory scholarly open-access publishers". According to the Journal Citation Reports, the journal had a 2016 journal impact factor of 4.778. However, that impact factor was based on a total of 9 "citable items" in 2014, as no articles were deemed "citable" in subsequent years, and in 2018 the journal was omitted from the 2017 Journal Citation Reports.
