= Immunotherapy (journal) =

- Discipline: Immunology
- Language: English
- Edited by: Y. Kawakami, F.M. Marincola, K. Tsang, D.C. Wraith

Publication details
- History: 2009-present
- Publisher: Future Medicine
- Frequency: 16/year
- Open access: Hybrid
- Impact factor: 2.716 (2016)

Standard abbreviations
- ISO 4: Immunotherapy

Indexing
- CODEN: IMMUCO
- ISSN: 1750-743X (print); 1750-7448 (web)
- LCCN: 2009243240
- OCLC no.: 495368971

Links
- Journal homepage

Immunotherapy is a peer-reviewed medical journal covering immunology and more specifically immunotherapy. It was established in 2009 and is published by Future Medicine. The founding editor-in-chief was Duc Hong Le. The current editors-in-chief are Y. Kawakami, F.M. Marincola, K. Tsang and D.C. Wraith.

== Abstracting and indexing ==
The journal is abstracted and indexed in:

- Biological Abstracts
- BIOSIS Previews
- Chemical Abstracts
- Embase
- Index Medicus/PubMed/MEDLINE
- Science Citation Index Expanded
- Scopus

According to the Journal Citation Reports, the journal has a 2016 impact factor of 2.716, ranking it 90th out of 150 journals in the category "Immunology".
