= Canadian Journal of Gastroenterology and Hepatology =

- Discipline: Gastroenterology, Hepatology
- Language: English, French

Publication details
- Former name: Canadian Journal of Gastroenterology
- History: 1987–present
- Publisher: Hindawi Publishing Corporation
- Frequency: Continuous
- Impact factor: 2.5 (2025)

Standard abbreviations
- ISO 4: Can. J. Gastroenterol. Hepatol.

Indexing
- ISSN: 2291-2789 (print); 2291-2797 (web)
- OCLC no.: 878931900

Links
- Journal homepage; Online access; Online archive

The Canadian Journal of Gastroenterology and Hepatology is a peer-reviewed medical journal covering all aspects of gastroenterology and liver disease. It is published by the Hindawi Publishing Corporation, after having been sold by Pulsus Group in 2015. It was the official journal of the Canadian Association of Gastroenterology and the Canadian Association for the Study of the Liver, who divested from the journal in December 2016 after the sale to Hindawi. It was established in 1987 as the Canadian Journal of Gastroenterology and obtained its current name in 2014.

== Abstracting and indexing ==
The journal is abstracted and indexed in:

- Index Medicus/MEDLINE/PubMed
- Current Contents/Clinical Medicine
- Science Citation Index Expanded
- Embase/Excerpta Medica
- Scopus
- ProQuest databases

According to the Journal Citation Reports, the journal has a 2025 impact factor of 2.5.
