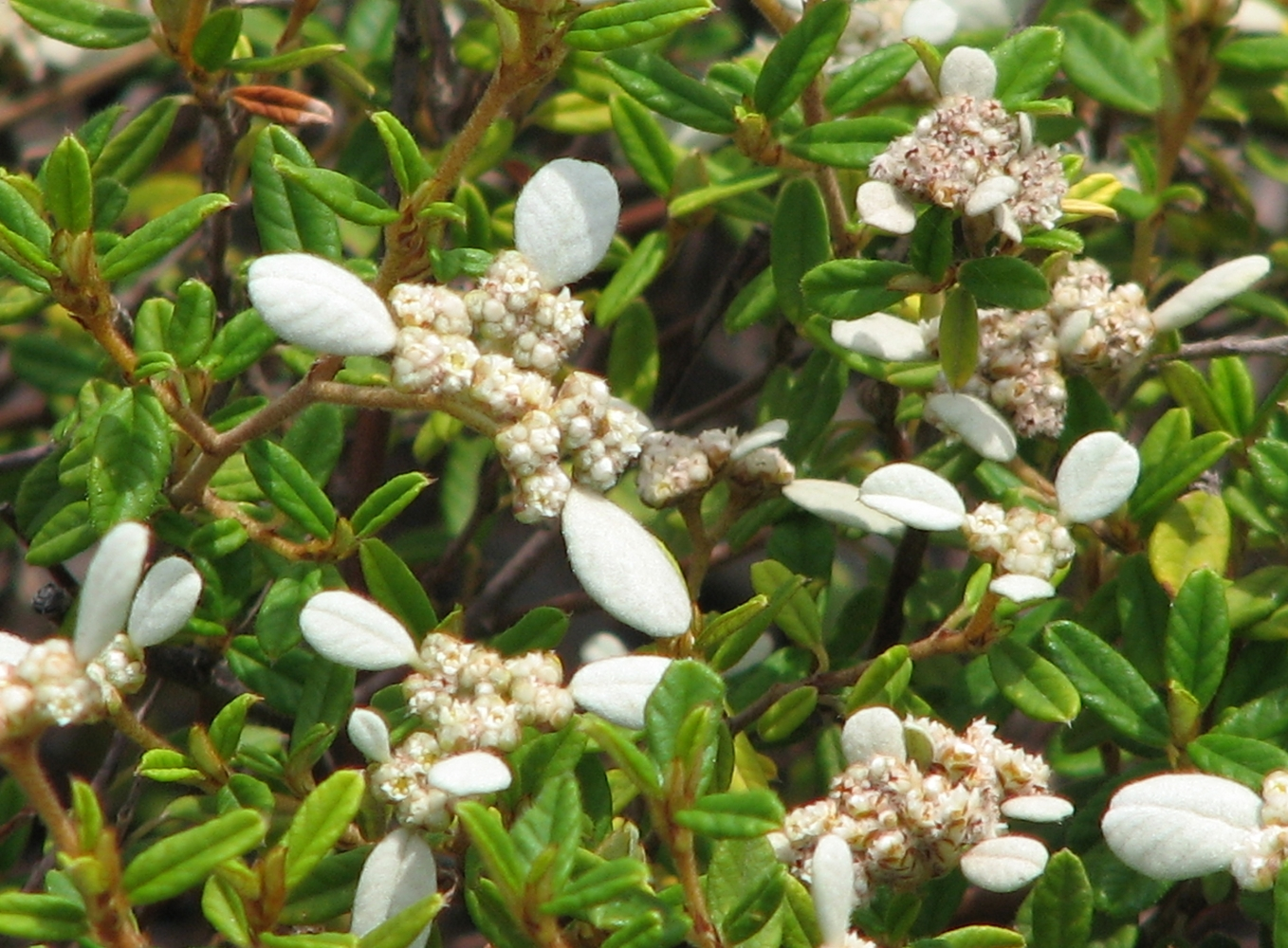
- In the Royal Botanic Gardens, Cranbourne

Scientific classification
- Kingdom: Plantae
- Clade: Tracheophytes
- Clade: Angiosperms
- Clade: Eudicots
- Clade: Rosids
- Order: Rosales
- Family: Rhamnaceae
- Genus: Spyridium
- Species: S. vexilliferum

Binomial name
- Spyridium vexilliferum (Hook.) Reissek

Synonyms
- Cryptandra vexillifera Hook.; Spyridium diffusum Reissek; Spyridium eriocephalum var. vexilliferum (Hook.) F.Muell.; Trymalium diversifolium F.Muell. nom. inval., nom. nud.

= Spyridium vexilliferum =

Winged spyridium

Species of plant

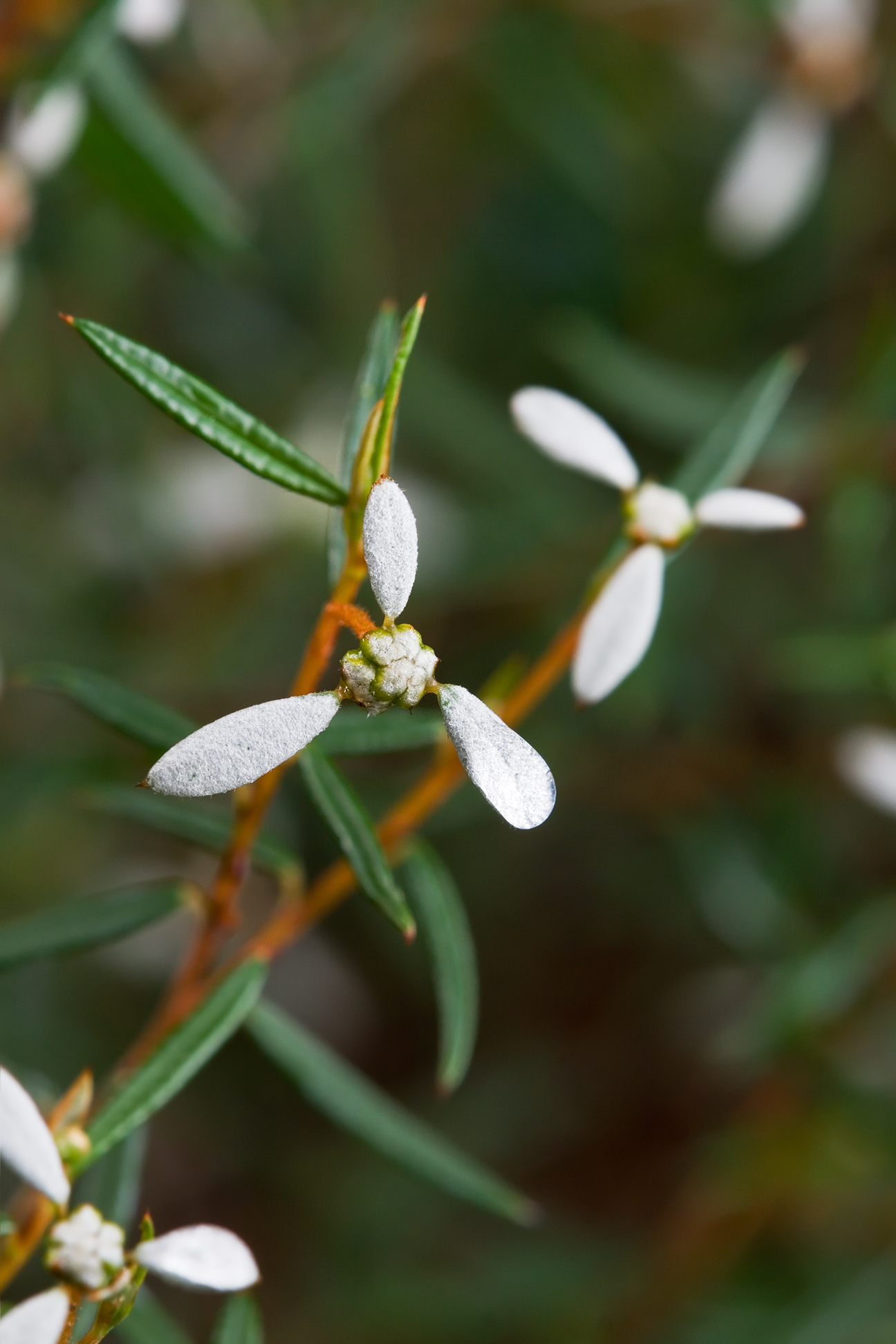
In the Royal Tasmanian Botanical Gardens

Spyridium vexilliferum, commonly known as winged spyridium, or helicopter bush, is a species of flowering plant in the family Rhamnaceae and is endemic to south-eastern Australia. It is a small, low-lying to erect shrub with linear to narrowly elliptic leaves, and dense heads of small white flowers.

== Description ==
Spyridium vexilliferum is a low-lying to erect shrub that typically grows to a height of up to 1.5 m (4 ft 11 in) and has its branchlets densely covered with star-shaped, often rust-coloured hairs. The leaves are linear to narrowly elliptic, 8–25 mm (0.31–0.98 in) long and 1–7 mm (0.039–0.276 in) wide with narrow, brown stipules 1–3 mm (0.039–0.118 in) long at the base. The edges of the leaves are rolled under, the upper surface glabrous and shiny, the lower surface covered with whitish hairs or often obscured. The heads of "flowers" are about 5 mm (0.20 in) in diameter and shaggy-hairy surrounded by up to 4 egg-shaped or oblong, woolly-white floral leaves. Flowering mainly occurs from September to January.

== Taxonomy ==
In 1834, William Jackson Hooker described Cryptandra vexillifera in The Journal of Botany from specimens collected at Port Dalrymple. In 1858, Siegfried Reissek changed the name to Spyridium vexilliferum in the journal Linnea. The specific epithet (vexilliferum) means "standard-bearing".

In 1863, George Bentham described S. vexilliferum var. latifolium in Flora Australiensis, and the name, and that of the autonym are accepted by the Australian Plant Census:

- Spyridium vexilliferum var. latifolium Benth. is a low-lying shrub up to about 80 cm (31 in) high with linear to narrowly elliptic leaves up to 3 mm (0.12 in) wide and elliptic floral leaves.
- Spyridium vexilliferum (Hook.) Reissek var. vexilliferum Benth. is a low-lying to erect shrub up to about 1.4 m (4 ft 7 in) high with linear to narrowly elliptic leaves 3–7 mm (0.12–0.28 in) wide and more or less round floral leaves.

== Distribution and habitat ==
The variety vexilliferum grows in sandy heath, heathy woodland or mallee and on rocky outcrops from the Eyre Peninsula in South Australia to scattered locations in south-western Victoria and in the east, north and west of Tasmania. Variety latifolium is only known from south-eastern South Australia to the Portland area in south-western Victoria.

== Conservation status ==
Spyridium vexilliferum var. vexilliferum is listed as "rare" in Tasmania under the Tasmanian Government Threatened Species Protection Act 1995.
