= Clinical Practice =

- Discipline: Good clinical practice
- Language: English

Publication details
- Former name: Therapy
- History: 2004-present
- Publisher: Open Access Journals (Pulsus Group)
- Frequency: Bimonthly
- Open access: Yes
- License: Creative Commons Attribution

Standard abbreviations
- ISO 4: Clin. Pract.

Indexing
- CODEN: CPLUA6
- ISSN: 2044-9038 (print); 2044-9046 (web)
- OCLC no.: 774628306

Links
- Journal homepage; Online access; Online archive

Clinical Practice is a bimonthly peer-reviewed open access medical journal. It covers good clinical practice and health care. The journal was established in 2004 as Therapy by Future Drugs Ltd, obtaining its current name in 2012 when it was published by Future Medicine. It is now published by Open Access Journals, an imprint of the Pulsus Group, which is on Jeffrey Beall's list of "Potential, possible, or probable" predatory open-access publishers after being acquired by the OMICS Publishing Group in 2016.

== Abstracting and indexing ==
The journal was abstracted and indexed in Chemical Abstracts Service (2012-2014) and Scopus (2012-2017).
