= Journal of Botany (disambiguation) =

Journal of Botany is a Hindawi academic journal.

Journal of Botany may also refer to:

- American Journal of Botany
- Australian Journal of Botany
- Journal of Botany, British and Foreign

Not to be confused with:

- Journal de Botanique

== See also ==
- Botany (journal), formerly the Canadian Journal of Botany
- New Journal of Botany, European journal formerly called Watsonia
