= International Journal of Clinical Rheumatology =

- Discipline: Rheumatology
- Language: English
- Edited by: D.E. Furst

Publication details
- Former name: Future Rheumatology
- History: 2007–present
- Publisher: Open Access Journals
- Frequency: Bimonthly
- Open access: Yes

Standard abbreviations
- ISO 4: Int. J. Clin. Rheumatol.

Indexing
- CODEN: IJCRHH
- ISSN: 1758-4272 (print); 1758-4280 (web)
- OCLC no.: 500671671

Links
- Journal homepage; Online access; Online archive

The International Journal of Clinical Rheumatology is a bimonthly peer-reviewed open access medical journal. It covers rheumatology and immunology. The editor-in-chief is D.E. Furst (University of California, Los Angeles). The journal was established in 2006 by Future Medicine under the title Future Rheumatology. It became International Journal of Clinical Rheumatology in 2009 and is now published by Open Access Journals, an imprint of the Pulsus Group, which is on Jeffrey Beall's list of "Potential, possible, or probable" predatory open-access publishers after being acquired by the OMICS Publishing Group in 2016.

== Abstracting and indexing ==
The journal was abstracted and indexed in Chemical Abstracts Service (discontinued), Embase (discontinued), and Scopus (discontinued in 2016).
