= Specificity constant =

Measure of enzyme efficiency

In the field of biochemistry, the specificity constant (also called kinetic efficiency or $k_{cat}/K_{M}$), is a measure of how efficiently an enzyme converts substrates into products. A comparison of specificity constants can also be used as a measure of the preference of an enzyme for different substrates (i.e., substrate specificity). The higher the specificity constant, the more the enzyme "prefers" that substrate.

The following equation, known as the Michaelis–Menten model, is used to describe the kinetics of enzymes:

$$\ce{{E} + S <=>[k_f][k_r] ES ->[k_{cat}] {E} + P}$$

where E, S, ES, and P represent enzyme, substrate, enzyme–substrate complex, and product, respectively. The symbols $k_f$, $k_r$, and $k_\mathrm{cat}$ denote the rate constants for the "forward" binding and "reverse" unbinding of substrate, and for the "catalytic" conversion of substrate into product, respectively.

The Michaelis constant in turn is defined as follows:

$$K_{M} = \frac{k_{r}+k_{cat}}{k_{f}}$$

The Michaelis constant is equal to the substrate concentration at which the enzyme converts substrates into products at half its maximal rate and hence is related to the affinity of the substrate for the enzyme. The catalytic constant ($k_{cat}$) is the rate of product formation when the enzyme is saturated with substrate and therefore reflects the enzyme's maximum rate. The rate of product formation is dependent on both how well the enzyme binds substrate and how fast the enzyme converts substrate into product once substrate is bound. For a kinetically perfect enzyme, every encounter between enzyme and substrate leads to product and hence the reaction velocity is only limited by the rate the enzyme encounters substrate in solution. Hence the upper limit for $k_{cat}/K_{M}$ is equal to rate of substrate diffusion which is between 10^{8} and 10^{9} s^{−1}M^{−1}.

== See also ==
- Turnover number
