= Scanning (journal) =

- Discipline: Microscopy
- Language: English
- Edited by: Guo-Song Wu

Publication details
- History: 1978-present
- Publisher: Hindawi Publishing Corporation
- Frequency: Bimonthly
- Open access: Yes
- Impact factor: 1.932 (2020)

Standard abbreviations
- ISO 4: Scanning

Indexing
- ISSN: 0161-0457 (print); 1932-8745 (web)
- OCLC no.: 3819106

Links
- Journal homepage; Online access

SCANNING: The Journal of Scanning Microscopies is a defunct peer-reviewed scientific journal that covered all aspects of scanning microscopy, including scanning electron, scanning probe and scanning optical microscopies. It ceased publication in 2024. Since 1 January 2017, Scanning became open access. It was published by Wiley and then by the Hindawi Publishing Corporation.
