= International Journal of RF and Microwave Computer-Aided Engineering =

Scientific journal on RF engineering

- Discipline: Radio-frequency and microwave engineering, computer-aided design
- Language: English

Publication details
- Former names: International Journal of Microwave and Millimeter-Wave Computer-Aided Engineering (1991–1998)
- History: 1991–present
- Publisher: Wiley-Hindawi
- Impact factor: 1 (2024)

Standard abbreviations
- ISO 4: Int. J. RF Microw. Comput.-Aided Eng.

Indexing
- ISSN: 1096-4290 (print); 1099-047X (web)
- LCCN: 98658585
- OCLC no.: 849072077

Links
- Journal homepage; Online access; Online archive (before 2023); Online archive (after 2023)

International Journal of RF and Microwave Computer-Aided Engineering is a peer-reviewed scientific journal, covering computer-aided design methodologies for radio-frequency and microwave engineering. Established in 1991 and originally published by Wiley, it was transferred to its subsidiary Hindawi in 2023, adopting an open access model. The journal was previously known as International Journal of Microwave and Millimeter-Wave Computer-Aided Engineering until 1998.

== Abstracting and indexing ==
The journal is abstracted and indexed in:

- Current Contents/Engineering, Computing & Technology
- EBSCO databases
- Ei Compendex
- Inspec
- ProQuest databases
- Science Citation Index Expanded
- Scopus

According to the Journal Citation Reports, the journal has a 2024 impact factor of 1.
