= Physics Research International =

- Discipline: Physics
- Language: English

Publication details
- History: 2008–2017
- Publisher: Hindawi Publishing Corporation
- Open access: Yes

Standard abbreviations
- ISO 4: Res. Lett. Phys.

Indexing
- ISSN: 2090-2220 (print); 2090-2239 (web)

Links
- Journal homepage

Physics Research International, previously known as Research Letters in Physics, was an open-access scientific journal publishing short (up to 4 pages) papers in the broad field of physics. The journal was established in 2008 and was published by the Hindawi Publishing Corporation. It ceased publications in 2017.

== Abstracting and indexing ==
The journal is abstracted and indexed in Academic OneFile, Academic Search Premier, Chemical Abstracts, EBSCO databases, InfoTrac, INSPEC, International Nuclear Information System, and Scopus.
