= Abstract and Applied Analysis =

- Discipline: Mathematics
- Language: English

Publication details
- History: 1996–present
- Publisher: Hindawi Publishing Corporation
- Frequency: Monthly
- Open access: Yes

Standard abbreviations
- ISO 4: Abstr. Appl. Anal.

Indexing
- ISSN: 1085-3375 (print); 1687-0409 (web)

Links
- Journal homepage

Abstract and Applied Analysis is a peer-reviewed mathematics journal covering the fields of abstract and applied analysis and traditional forms of analysis such as linear and nonlinear ordinary and partial differential equations, optimization theory, and control theory.

It is published by Hindawi Publishing Corporation. It was established by Athanassios G. Kartsatos (University of South Florida) in 1996, who was editor-in-chief until 2005. Martin Bohner (Missouri S&T) was editor-in-chief from 2006 until 2011 when the journal converted to a model shared by all Hindawi journals of not having an editor-in-chief, with editorial decisions made by editorial board members.

The journal has faced delisting from the Journal Citation Reports (thus not receive an impact factor), for anomalous citation patterns.
