= International Journal of Zoology =

- Discipline: Zoology
- Language: English

Publication details
- History: 2009-present
- Publisher: Hindawi Publishing Corporation
- Open access: Yes

Standard abbreviations
- ISO 4: Int. J. Zool.

Indexing
- ISSN: 1687-8477 (print); 1687-8485 (web)
- OCLC no.: 321528445

Links
- Journal homepage; Online archive

The International Journal of Zoology is a peer-reviewed open access scientific journal covering all areas of zoology. It was established in 2009.

== Abstracting and indexing ==
The journal is abstracted and indexed in AGRICOLA, CAB Abstracts, Chemical Abstracts Service, ProQuest databases, Scopus, and The Zoological Record.
