= Neural Plasticity (journal) =

- Discipline: Neuroscience
- Language: English

Publication details
- Former names: Journal of Neural Transplantation, Journal of Neural Transplantation and Plasticity
- History: 1989-present
- Publisher: Hindawi Publishing Corporation
- Frequency: Upon acceptance
- Impact factor: 3.582 (2014)

Standard abbreviations
- ISO 4: Neural Plast.

Indexing
- CODEN: NEPLFE
- ISSN: 2090-5904 (print); 1687-5443 (web)
- LCCN: 2006242309
- OCLC no.: 70708345

Links
- Journal homepage; Online access

Neural Plasticity is a peer-reviewed scientific journal covering all aspects of neuroplasticity, especially when concerning its functional involvement in the regulation of behavior and in psychopathology. The journal was established in 1989 as the Journal of Neural Transplantation and renamed in 1991 to Journal of Neural Transplantation and Plasticity, before obtaining its current name in 1998. It is published by Hindawi Publishing Corporation.

== Abstracting and indexing ==
The journal is abstracted and indexed in:

- Academic OneFile
- Biological Abstracts
- BIOSIS Previews
- Chemical Abstracts Service
- CSA Neurosciences Abstracts
- EBSCOhost
- EMBASE
- Excerpta Medica
- Index Medicus/MEDLINE/PubMed
- PsycINFO
- Science Citation Index Expanded
- Scopus

According to the Journal Citation Reports, the journal has a 2012 impact factor of 2.864.
