= Diffusion-limited enzyme =

Enzyme rate limited by diffusion

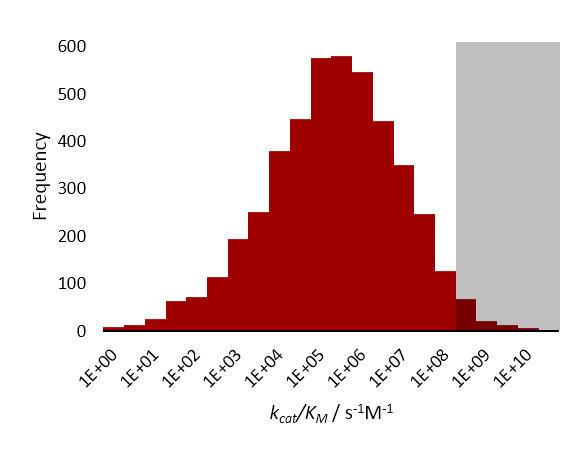
The distribution of known enzyme catalytic rates (k_{cat}/K_{M}). Most enzymes have a rate around 10^{5} s^{−1}M^{−1}. The fastest enzymes in the dark box on the right (>10^{8} s^{−1}M^{−1}) are constrained by the diffusion limit. (Data adapted from reference)

A diffusion-limited enzyme catalyses a reaction so efficiently that the rate limiting step is that of substrate diffusion into the active site, or product diffusion out. This is also known as kinetic perfection or catalytic perfection. Since the rate of catalysis of such enzymes is set by the diffusion-controlled reaction, it therefore represents an intrinsic, physical constraint on evolution (a maximum peak height in the fitness landscape). Diffusion limited perfect enzymes are very rare. Most enzymes catalyse their reactions to a rate that is 1,000-10,000 times slower than this limit. This is due to both the chemical limitations of difficult reactions, and the evolutionary limitations that such high reaction rates do not confer any extra fitness.

== History ==
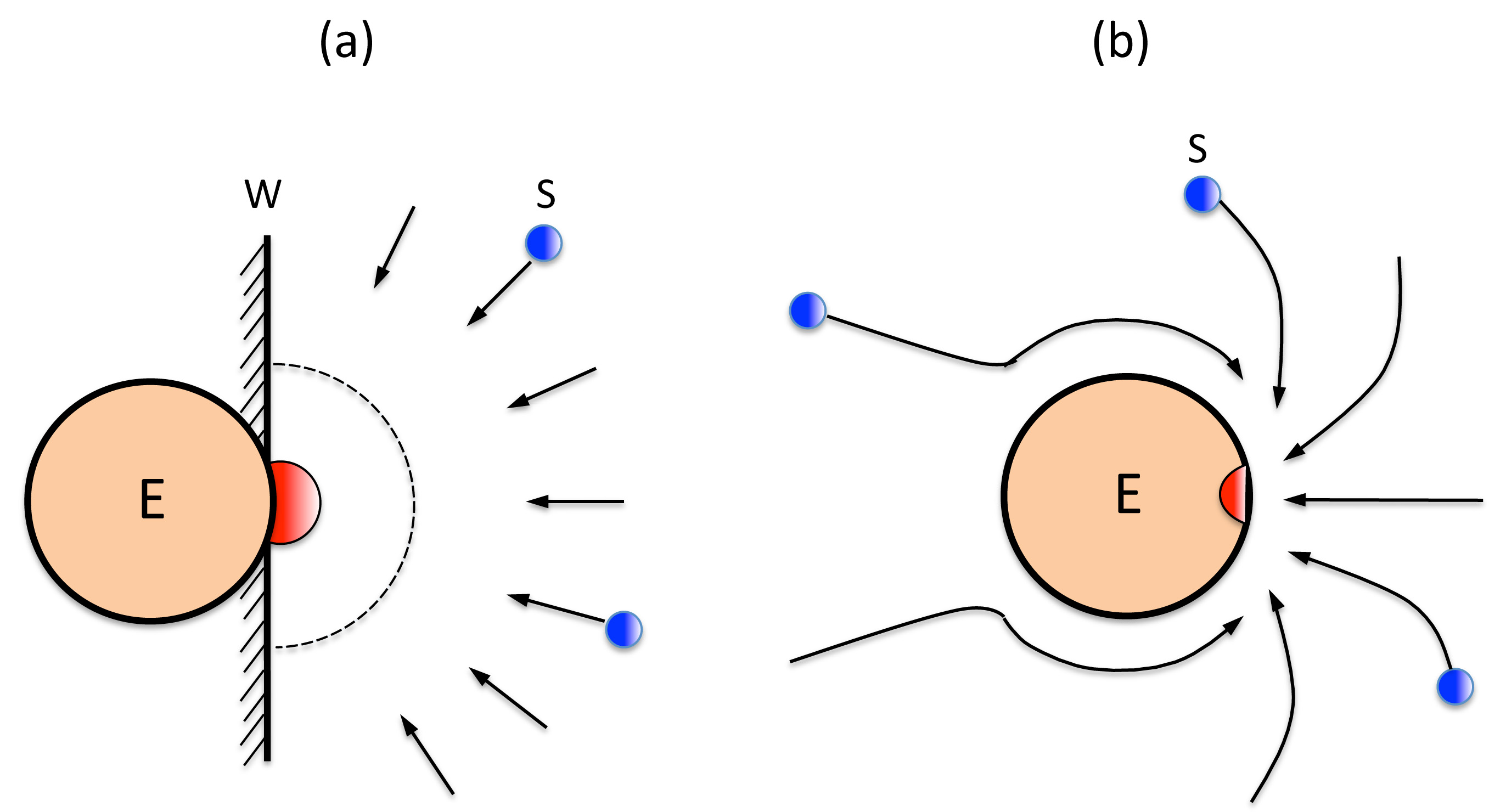
An illustration to show (a) Alberty-Hammes-Eigen model, and (b) Chou's model, where E denotes the enzyme whose active site is colored in red, while the substrate S in blue.

The theory of diffusion-controlled reactions was originally utilized by R.A. Alberty, Gordon Hammes, and Manfred Eigen to estimate the upper limit of enzyme-substrate reaction. According to their estimation, the upper limit of enzyme-substrate reaction was 10^{9} M^{−1} s^{−1}.

In 1972, it was observed that in the dehydration of H_{2}CO_{3} catalyzed by carbonic anhydrase, the second-order rate constant obtained experimentally was about 1.5 × 10^{10} M^{−1} s^{−1}, which was one order of magnitude higher than the upper limit estimated by Alberty, Hammes, and Eigen based on a simplified model.

To address such a paradox, Kuo-Chen Chou and his co-workers proposed a model by taking into account the spatial factor and force field factor between the enzyme and its substrate and found that the upper limit could reach 10^{10} M^{−1} s^{−1}, and can be used to explain some surprisingly high reaction rates in molecular biology.

The new upper limit found by Chou et al. for enzyme-substrate reaction was further discussed and analyzed by a series of follow-up studies.

A detailed comparison between the simplified Alberty-Hammes-Eigen's model (a) and the Chou's model (b) in calculating the diffusion-controlled reaction rate of enzyme with its substrate, or the upper limit of enzyme-substrate reaction, was elaborated in the paper.

== Mechanism ==
Kinetically perfect enzymes have a specificity constant, k_{cat}/K_{m}, on the order of 10^{8} to 10^{9} M^{−1} s^{−1}. The rate of the enzyme-catalysed reaction is limited by diffusion and so the enzyme 'processes' the substrate well before it encounters another molecule.

Some enzymes operate with kinetics which are faster than diffusion rates, which would seem to be impossible. Several mechanisms have been invoked to explain this phenomenon. Some proteins are believed to accelerate catalysis by drawing their substrate in and preorienting them by using dipolar electric fields. Some invoke a quantum-mechanical tunneling explanation whereby a proton or an electron can tunnel through activation barriers. Although the proton tunneling theory remains controversial, it has been suggested to be the only possible mechanism in the case of the soybean lipoxygenase.

== Evolution ==
There are not many kinetically perfect enzymes. This can be explained in terms of natural selection. An increase in catalytic speed may be favoured as it could confer some advantage to the organism. However, when the catalytic speed outstrips diffusion speed (i.e. substrates entering and leaving the active site, and also encountering substrates) there is no more advantage to increase the speed even further. The diffusion limit represents an absolute physical constraint on evolution. Increasing the catalytic speed past the diffusion speed will not aid the organism in any way and so represents a global maximum in a fitness landscape. Therefore, these perfect enzymes must have come about by 'lucky' random mutation which happened to spread, or because the faster speed was once useful as part of a different reaction in the enzyme's ancestry.

== Examples ==
- Acetylcholinesterase
- β-lactamase
- Catalase
- Carbonic anhydrase
- Carbon monoxide dehydrogenase
- Cytochrome c peroxidase
- Fumarase
- Superoxide dismutase
- Triosephosphate isomerase

== See also ==
- Diffusion-controlled reaction
- Enzyme
  - Enzyme catalysis
  - Enzyme kinetics
  - Enzyme engineering
