= Contrast Media & Molecular Imaging =

- Discipline: Chemistry; Pharmacology; Medical imaging; Molecular imaging
- Language: English
- Edited by: Luc Zimmer, University of Lyon & Hospices Civils de Lyon

Publication details
- History: 2006–present
- Publisher: John Wiley & Sons & Hindawi Publishing Corporation
- Frequency: Monthly
- Impact factor: 3.161 (2020)

Standard abbreviations
- ISO 4: Contrast Media Mol. Imaging

Indexing
- CODEN: CMMICO
- ISSN: 1555-4309 (print); 1555-4317 (web)
- LCCN: 2005212234
- OCLC no.: 58749692

Links
- Journal homepage

Contrast Media & Molecular Imaging is a monthly peer-reviewed scientific journal published by John Wiley & Sons since 2006 and by Hindawi Publishing Corporation since 2017. It covers the areas of contrast agents and molecular imaging, covering all areas of imaging technologies with a special emphasis on magnetic resonance imaging and positron emission tomography, but also all other in vivo imaging technologies such as x-Ray, CT, ultrasound etc. The current editor-in-chief is Luc Zimmer, professor of pharmacology at the (University of Lyon). On 1 January 2017, the journal became fully open access due to a publishing partnership between John Wiley & Sons and the Hindawi Publishing Corporation, where the journal "remain[s] a Wiley title but will be published and hosted by Hindawi". Molecular imaging articles concentrate on the potential role played by MRI and PET contrast agents at visualizing, at the molecular or cellular level, the physiology and physio-pathological processes from animal models to humans.

== Annual Issues ==
1. Development and Application of Nanoparticles in Biomedical Imaging
2. In Vivo Imaging of Inflammation and Infection

== Abstracting and indexing ==
The journal is abstracted and indexed in SciFinder, Scopus, and Web of Science. The 2020 impact factor was 3.161.

== See also ==
- Molecular imaging
