= International Journal of Optics =

- Discipline: Optics, photonics
- Language: English
- Edited by: Giulio Cerullo

Publication details
- History: 2009-present
- Publisher: Wiley
- Frequency: Continuous
- Open access: Yes
- Impact factor: 1.7 (2024)

Standard abbreviations
- ISO 4: Int. J. Opt.

Indexing
- ISSN: 1687-9384 (print); 1687-9392 (web)

Links
- Journal homepage; Online access; Online archive

International Journal of Optics is a peer-reviewed and open access scientific journal published by Wiley. Covering fundamental and applied research in optics and photonics, it was established in 2009 as a merger of two journals, Advances in Nonlinear Optics and Research Letters in Optics. The journal was published by Hindawi until the latter's discontinuation of the brand in 2023. Its current editor-in-chief is Giulio Cerullo (Politecnico di Milano).

== Abstracting and indexing ==
The journal is abstracted and indexed in:

- Current Contents/Engineering, Computing & Technology
- Current Contents/Physical, Chemical & Earth Sciences
- Directory of Open Access Journals
- EBSCO databases
- Ei Compendex
- Inspec
- ProQuest databases
- Science Citation Index Expanded
- Scopus

According to the Journal Citation Reports, the journal has a 2024 impact factor of 1.7.
