= Parkinson's Disease (journal) =

- Discipline: Neurology
- Language: English

Publication details
- History: 2009–present
- Publisher: Hindawi Publishing Corporation
- Frequency: Irregular
- Impact factor: 1.702 (2016)

Standard abbreviations
- ISO 4: Parkinson's Dis.
- NLM: Parkinsons Dis

Indexing
- ISSN: 2042-0080 (print); 2090-8083 (web)
- LCCN: 2010247839

Links
- Journal homepage; Online archive

Parkinson's Disease is an open access medical journal covering Parkinson's disease. It was established in 2009 and is published by Hindawi Publishing Corporation. According to the Journal Citation Reports, the journal has a 2016 impact factor of 1.702.
