= Graham Lees =

British publisher

Graham V. Lees
- Education: University of Cambridge
- Known for: Founding editor-in-chief of The Scientific World Journal
- Scientific career
- Fields: Neuroscience
- Workplaces: Cambridge, Gif-sur-Yvette, Amsterdam, New York, San Diego, Helsinki, Kirkkonummi

Graham Vaughan Lees is a publisher and founding editor-in-chief of The Scientific World Journal, which he edited until the summer of 2011. He is the owner of Corpus Alienum Oy, a Finnish publisher.

== Education ==
Lees obtained a PhD in Neuroscience from the University of Cambridge in 1974. Subsequently, he did a postdoc at the "Laboratoire de Neurobiologie Cellulaire" on the CNRS campus in Gif-sur-Yvette, France.

== Career ==
As publisher, Lees worked subsequently for Elsevier (Amsterdam), Raven Press (New York), and Academic Press. His early involvement with online publishing started with the Journal of Molecular Biology. At Academic Press, Lees was vice-president the "Life and Biomedical" program and later also for the journal publishing program before leaving and setting up The ScientificWorldJournal (since 2011 published as The Scientific World Journal). He is an occasional publishing consultant for learned societies and co-edited a book on drug development. Lees was also chair of the Program Committee of the Second European Conference on Scientific Publishing in Biomedicine and Medicine which was held in September 2008 in Oslo.
