= Canadian Journal of Infectious Diseases and Medical Microbiology =

- Discipline: Infectious diseases
- Language: English, French
- Edited by: John Conly

Publication details
- Former name: Canadian Journal of Infectious Diseases
- History: 1990–present
- Publisher: Hindawi Publishing Corporation
- Frequency: Quarterly
- Impact factor: 2.8 (2022)

Standard abbreviations
- ISO 4: Can. J. Infect. Dis. Med. Microbiol.

Indexing
- ISSN: 1712-9532 (print); 1918-1493 (web)
- OCLC no.: 958681648

Links
- Journal homepage; Online archive

The Canadian Journal of Infectious Diseases and Medical Microbiology is a quarterly peer-reviewed medical journal. It is the official journal of the Canadian Association for HIV Research, for which it serves as the primary source of society guidelines. It is published by Hindawi Publishing Corporation and covers all aspects of infectious diseases and medical microbiology.

In 2012, the journal moved to open access.

== Abstracting and indexing ==
The journal is abstracted and indexed in CAB Abstracts, Embase, Global Health, Science Citation Index Expanded, and Scopus. According to the Journal Citation Reports, the journal has a 2022 impact factor of 2.8.
