= Psyche (entomology journal) =

- Discipline: Entomology
- Language: English

Publication details
- History: 1874-present
- Publisher: Hindawi Publishing Corporation for the Cambridge Entomological Club (United States)
- Open access: Yes
- License: Creative Commons Attribution License

Standard abbreviations
- ISO 4: Psyche (Camb. Mass.)

Indexing
- CODEN: PSYCHAQ
- ISSN: 0033-2615 (print); 1687-7438 (web)
- LCCN: sf80000609
- OCLC no.: 191673651

Links
- Journal homepage

Psyche: A Journal of Entomology is a scientific journal of entomology which was established in 1874 by the Cambridge Entomological Club as a "journal for the publication of biological contributions upon Arthropoda from any competent person". The name of the journal is derived from the Ancient Greek word psyche, which can be translated as soul, butterfly, or moth.

The journal has been published since 1874 (with gaps from 1886 to 1887, 1995 to 1999, and 2000 to 2007). In 2007 the Club transferred the journal to the Hindawi Publishing Corporation, and it became an open access journal in 2008, with articles distributed online under the Creative Commons Attribution License. Almost all back issues were scanned and are available online as PDF files.

== History ==
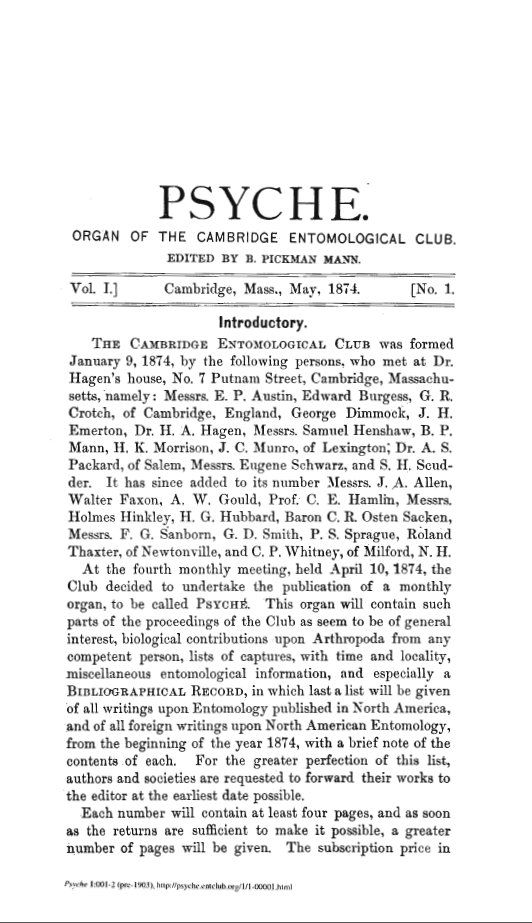
Cover page of Volume 1, number 1.

Samuel Hubbard Scudder proposed to start an "Organ of the Cambridge Entomological Club" at its fourth meeting. When Psyche began publication, its first editor was B. P. Mann. Its articles concentrated on general anatomy, biological entomology, and to set up a bibliographic record of all writings on entomology published in North America and about North American entomology.
