= The Scientific World Journal =

- Discipline: Biology, biomedicine, medicine
- Language: English

Publication details
- History: 2001–present
- Publisher: Hindawi Publishing Corporation
- Frequency: Upon acceptance
- Open access: Yes

Standard abbreviations
- ISO 4: Sci. World J.

Indexing
- CODEN: THESAS
- ISSN: 2356-6140 (print); 1537-744X (web)
- LCCN: 2001215320
- OCLC no.: 48386834

Links
- Journal homepage; Online access

The Scientific World Journal (formerly, The ScientificWorldJournal) is a peer-reviewed scientific journal covering fields in the life sciences ranging from biomedicine to environmental sciences. It was established in 2001 and is published by Hindawi Publishing Corporation. The journal was delisted in the 2015 Journal Citation Reports (thus not receiving an impact factor) because of "anomalous citation patterns".

== Publication history ==
The journal was established in 2001 and is published online and in print. From 2001 to 2011, the managing editor was Graham Lees. In 2011, the journal was acquired by Hindawi Publishing Corporation and converted to open access and to a model without an editor-in-chief. According to Institute for Scientific Information counts, the number of published items in the journal grew steadily from 141 to 227 articles per year between 2008 and 2011 and then increased over fivefold to 1,149 articles in 2011.

== Organization ==
The journal was divided into "domains", each covering a particular subject (e.g., "Neuroscience") and some of these domains could be joined further into "clusters" (e.g., "Neuroscience, Neurology & Psychiatry"). Each domain had its own set of principal and associate editors, as well as an editorial board. Published articles could be assigned to multiple, different domains, so that an article on, for example, air particulates could be found easily both by researchers working in environmental or Earth sciences and biomedical researchers searching for causes of asthma. After the journal was taken over by Hindawi, it was reorganized according to a more traditional model with more rigid subject sections. However, the journal has no formal editor-in-chief any more and decisions regarding acceptance or rejection of a manuscript appear to be made by majority vote from a mix of external reviewers and editors (whose identity remains confidential unless a manuscript is accepted for publication).

== Abstracting and indexing ==
The journal is abstracted and indexed in:

- Academic OneFile
- Academic Search Complete
- Aquatic Sciences and Fisheries Abstracts
- CAB Abstracts
- Chemical Abstracts
- CINAHL Plus
- EBSCO databases
- Embase
- Global Health
- Inspec
- MEDLINE/PubMed
- Meteorological & Geoastrophysical Abstracts
- ProQuest databases
- Scopus
- Zentralblatt MATH

According to the Journal Citation Reports, the journal had a 2013 impact factor of 1.219. However, the journal did not receive an impact factor over 2011, nor was it listed in the 2015 Journal Citation Reports because of "anomalous citation patterns".
