= BioMed Research International =

- Discipline: Biomedical sciences
- Language: English

Publication details
- Former names: Journal of Biomedicine and Biotechnology
- History: 2001-present
- Publisher: Hindawi Publishing Corporation
- Open access: Yes
- Impact factor: 2.583 (2017)

Standard abbreviations
- ISO 4: BioMed Res. Int.

Indexing
- CODEN: BRIIDT
- ISSN: 2314-6133 (print); 2314-6141 (web)
- OCLC no.: 825938566
- Journal of Biomedicine and Biotechnology
- ISSN: 1110-7243 (print); 1110-7251 (web)

Links
- Journal homepage; Online archive

BioMed Research International is a peer-reviewed open access scientific journal covering all aspects of biomedical sciences. It was established in 2001 as the Journal of Biomedicine and Biotechnology with Abdelali Haoudi as first editor-in-chief (until 2008). The journal obtained its current title in 2013 and is published by Hindawi Publishing Corporation.

== Abstracting and indexing ==
The journal is abstracted and indexed in:

- Academic OneFile
- Aluminium Industry Abstracts
- Biological Abstracts
- BIOSIS Previews
- CAB Abstracts
- Chemical Abstracts Service
- Chemical Engineering and Biotechnology Abstracts
- CINAHL
- CSA Technology Research Database
- Dairy Science Abstracts
- EBSCOhost
- Elsevier BIOBASE/Current Awareness in Biological Sciences
- EMBASE
- EMBiology
- EMCare
- Expanded Academic ASAP
- Forestry Abstracts
- Global Health
- Health Reference Center Academic
- Index Medicus/MEDLINE/PubMed/PMC
- Polymer Library
- ProQuest databases
- SafetyLit
- Science Citation Index Expanded
- Scopus
- Solid State and Superconductivity Abstracts
- Tropical Diseases Bulletin

According to the Journal Citation Reports, the journal has a 2014 impact factor of 1.579, and in 2016 its ranking was 65/158 of Biotechnology & Applied Microbiology.
