= Leonid Schneider =

Ukrainian-German science journalist

- Born: 1977; Zhytomyr, Ukraine
- Known for: Blogging on research integrity and ethics
- Scientific career
- Thesis: Role of the mitotic spindle associated protein TACC3 in cell proliferation and survival (2008)
- Doctoral advisor: Bernd Nürnberg
- Website: forbetterscience.com

Leonid Schneider (born 1977) is a Ukrainian-German science journalist and molecular cell biologist. He is known for his blog For Better Science that covers research integrity and ethics.

== Career ==
Schneider was born to a Jewish family in Zhytomyr, Ukraine, and moved to Germany to attend university. He earned an MSc in biology at the University of Cologne in 2003 and a PhD in biology at the University of Düsseldorf in 2008, with the dissertation Role of the mitotic spindle associated protein TACC3 in cell proliferation and survival. He was a doctoral candidate at the university clinic in Cologne 2003–2007 and subsequently a postdoctoral researcher at the Fondazione Istituto FIRC di Oncologia Molecolare in Milan 2008–2012, the Technische Universität Darmstadt 2012–2013 and the Max Planck Institute for Polymer Research 2014–2015. His research focused on molecular cell biology, stem cells and cancer research.

Since 2015 he has worked as a freelance science journalist and cartoonist, and he has become known for his blog For Better Science that covers research integrity and ethics, especially in the biomedical sciences. In 2020 his blog published an article by Elisabeth Bik and three co-authors that revealed the existence of a Chinese "paper mill" believed to be responsible for over 1,300 fraudulent papers by Chinese authors.

He is an active member of the Green party in Germany (Bündnis 90/Die Grünen) and has been involved in local campaigning for the 2025 federal election as well as writing a scolding letter about the interview of a local CDU party chair in Erlensee.

== Legal problems ==
Schneider has occasionally been sued over his blog posts; for example by a German scientist couple, in connection with the scandal around Paolo Macchiarini. More recently, he has been involved in legal disputes brought by Didier Raoult, Jan van Deursen and Gabrio Bassotti.
