= International Journal of Antennas and Propagation =

- Discipline: Antenna technology, electromagnetic propagation, scattering
- Language: English
- Edited by: Slawomir Koziel

Publication details
- Publisher: Hindawi
- Open access: Yes
- Impact factor: 1.5 (2022)

Standard abbreviations
- ISO 4: Int. J. Antennas Propag.

Indexing
- ISSN: 1687-5869 (print); 1687-5877 (web)
- LCCN: 2008204849
- OCLC no.: 173189843

Links
- Journal homepage; Online access; Annual issues

International Journal of Antennas and Propagation is a peer reviewed, scientific open access journal that publishes original and review articles in all areas of antennas and propagation. The editor-in-chief is Slawomir Koziel.

== Abstracting and indexing ==
This journal is abstracted and indexed by the following services

- Academic Onefile
- Aerospace and High Technology Database
- Aluminium Industry Abstracts
- Current Contents - Engineering, Computing and Technology
- EBSCO
- Ei Compendex
- INSPEC
- Science Citation Index
- Scopus
- Solid State and Superconductivity Abstracts

According to the Journal Citation Reports, the journal has a 2022 impact factor of 1.5.
