= International Journal of Mathematics and Mathematical Sciences =

- Discipline: Mathematics
- Language: English

Publication details
- History: 1978—present
- Publisher: Hindawi Publishing Corporation
- Frequency: Biweekly
- Open access: Yes

Standard abbreviations
- ISO 4: Int. J. Math. Math. Sci.

Indexing
- CODEN: INTJM4
- ISSN: 0161-1712 (print); 1687-0425 (web)
- OCLC no.: 644502037

Links
- Journal homepage

The International Journal of Mathematics and Mathematical Sciences is a biweekly peer-reviewed mathematics journal. It was established in 1978 by Lokenath Debnath and is published by the Hindawi Publishing Corporation.

The journal publishes articles in all areas of mathematics such as pure and applied mathematics, mathematical physics, theoretical mechanics, probability and mathematical statistics, and theoretical biology.

== Indexing and abstracting ==
The journal is or has been indexed and abstracted in the following bibliographic databases:

- EBSCO Information Services
- Emerging Sources Citation Index
- Mathematical Reviews
- ProQuest databases
- Scopus
- Zentralblatt MATH
