= Evidence-Based Complementary and Alternative Medicine =

- Discipline: Complementary medicine, alternative medicine
- Language: English

Publication details
- History: 2004–2024
- Publisher: Hindawi Publishing Corporation
- Frequency: Quarterly
- Open access: Yes
- Impact factor: 2.650 (2021)

Standard abbreviations
- ISO 4: Evid.-Based Complementary Altern. Med.
- NLM: Evid Based Complement Alternat Med

Indexing
- ISSN: 1741-427X (print); 1741-4288 (web)
- OCLC no.: 55647292

Links
- Journal homepage

Evidence-Based Complementary and Alternative Medicine is a peer-reviewed open-access medical journal that covered complementary and alternative medicine. It was acquired by Wiley in 2021 as part of its acquisition of Hindawi. It was discontinued in September 2024 after being delisted by Clarivate's Web of Science.

== History ==
The journal was established in 2004 by Edwin L. Cooper, who also served as its editor-in-chief until 2010, when the journal moved from Oxford University Press to Hindawi.

Initially, the journal was entirely open access, without publication charge to the authors except for color figures, but Oxford University Press changed its policy in 2008 and made reviews, editorials, and commentaries subscription-based, while maintaining open access for original research papers. Hindawi returned the journal to a full open access model, but authors have to pay an article processing charge.

According to the Journal Citation Reports, the journal had a 2021 impact factor of 2.650. In 2023, Clarivate removed the journal from its Web of Science. According to Retraction Watch, "Removing a journal from Web of Science means Clarivate will no longer index its papers, count their citations, or give the title an impact factor."

Wiley discontinued the journal's publication as of September 2024. Edzard Ernst noted the large number of retractions in PubMed, which numbered 744 as of October 14, 2024.

One of the founding members of the editorial board, Ernst said the journal mostly published "useless rubbish", primarily due to ineffective peer review.
