= Diffusion-controlled reaction =

Reaction rate equals rate of transport

Diffusion-controlled (or diffusion-limited) reactions are reactions in which the reaction rate is equal to the rate of transport of the reactants through the reaction medium (usually a solution).

The process of chemical reaction can be considered as involving the diffusion of reactants until they encounter each other in the right stoichiometry and form an activated complex which can form the product species. The observed rate of chemical reactions is, generally speaking, the rate of the slowest or "rate determining" step. In diffusion controlled reactions the formation of products from the activated complex is much faster than the diffusion of reactants and thus the rate is governed by collision frequency.

== Occurrence ==
Diffusion control is rare in the gas phase, where rates of diffusion of molecules are generally very high. Diffusion control is more likely in solution where diffusion of reactants is slower due to the greater number of collisions with solvent molecules. Reactions where the activated complex forms easily and the products form rapidly are most likely to be limited by diffusion control. Examples are those involving catalysis and enzymatic reactions. Heterogeneous reactions where reactants are in different phases are also candidates for diffusion control.

One classical test for diffusion control of a heterogeneous reaction is to observe whether the rate of reaction is affected by stirring or agitation; if so then the reaction is almost certainly diffusion controlled under those conditions.

== Diffusion limit ==
Consider a reaction, in which the rate-limiting elementary reaction step is of the form

A + B → C

and occurs at rate $k_r$ when molecules of A and B touch. For a bulk system, the observed reaction rate $k$ is depressed, because molecules of A and B must diffuse towards each other before reacting. At very large values of $k_r$, the bulk reaction occurs at a rate $k_D$ which is relatively independent of the properties of the reaction itself. The following derivation is adapted from Foundations of Chemical Kinetics.

Consider sphere of radius $R_A$, centered at a spherical molecule A, with reactant B flowing in and out of it; molecules A and B touch when the distance between the two molecules is $R_{AB}$ apart. Thus $[B](R_{AB})k_r = [B]k$, where $[B](r)$ is the smoothed "local concentration" of B at position $r$.

If we assume a local steady state, then the average rate at which B reaches $R_{AB}$ corresponds to the observed reaction rate $k$. This can be written as:

$$[B]k=-4\pi r^2 J_{B}\text{,}$$	1

where $J_{B}$ is the flux of B into the sphere. By Fick's law of diffusion,

$$J_{B} = -D_{AB} \left(\frac{d[B](r)}{dr} +\frac{[B](r)}{k_{B}T} \frac{dU}{dr}\right)\text{,}$$	2

where $D_{AB}$ is the diffusion coefficient, obtained by the Stokes-Einstein equation. The second term is the positional gradient of the chemical potential.

Inserting (2) into (1) gives

$$[B]k = 4\pi r^2 D_{AB}\left(\frac{dB(r)}{dr}+\frac{[B](r)}{k_{B}T} \frac{dU}{dr}\right)\text{.}$$	3

It is convenient at this point to use the identity
$$\exp\left(-\frac{U(r)}{k_{B}T}\right)\frac{d}{dr}\left([B](r)\exp\left(\frac{U(r)}{k_{B}T}\right)\right) = \frac{d[B](r)}{dr}+\frac{[B](r)}{k_{B}T} \frac{dU}{dr}$$
and rewrite (3) as

$$[B]k = 4\pi r^2 D_{AB} \exp\left(-\frac{U(r)}{k_{B}T}\right)\frac{d}{dr}\left([B](r)\exp\left(\frac{U(r)}{k_{B}T}\right)\right)$$	4

Thus

$$k\cdot\frac{[B]}{4\pi r^2 D_{AB}}\exp\left(\frac{U(r)}{k_{B}T}\right) = \frac{d}{dr}\left([B](r)\exp\left(\frac{U(r)}{k_{B}T}\right)\right)$$	5

which is an ordinary differential equation in $[B](r)$.

Using the boundary conditions that $[B](r)\rightarrow [B]$, ie the local concentration of B approaches that of the solution at large distances, and consequently $U(r) \rightarrow 0$ as $r \rightarrow \infty$, we can solve (5) by separation of variables. Namely:

$$\int_{R_{AB}}^{\infty} \frac{[B]k\,dr}{4\pi r^2 D_{AB}}\exp\left(\frac{U(r)}{k_{B}T}\right) = \int_{R_{AB}}^{\infty} d\left([B](r)\exp\left(\frac{U(r)}{k_{B}T}\right)\right)$$	6

Defining
$$\beta^{-1} = \int_{R_{AB}}^{\infty} \frac{1}{r^2}\exp\left(\frac{U(r)}{k_B T}\right)\,dr\text{,}$$
(6) simplifies to

$$\frac{[B]k}{4\pi D_{AB}\beta }= [B]-[B](R_{AB})\exp\left(\frac{U(R_{AB})}{k_{B}T}\right)$$	7

From the definition of $k_r$, we have. Substituting this into (7) and rearranging yields

$$k = \frac{4\pi D_{AB}\beta k_r }{k_r + 4\pi D_{AB} \beta \exp\left(\frac{U(R_{AB} )}{k_B T}\right) }$$	8

Taking $k_r$ very large gives the diffusion-limited reaction rate
$$k_D = 4\pi D_{AB} \beta\text{.}$$
(8) can then be re-written as the "diffusion influenced rate constant"

$$k= \frac{k_D k_r}{k_r + k_D \exp\left(\frac{U(R_{AB} )}{k_B T}\right)}$$	9

If the forces that bind A and B together are weak, i.e. $U(r) \approx 0$ for all $r>R_{AB}$, then
$$\beta^{-1} \approx \frac{1}{R_{AB}}$$
In that case, (9) simplifies even further to

$$k = \frac{k_D k_r}{k_r + k_D}$$	10

This equation is true for a very large proportion of industrially relevant reactions in solution.

=== Viscosity dependence ===
The Stokes-Einstein equation describes a frictional force on a sphere of diameter $R_A$ as $D_A = \frac{k_BT}{3\pi R_A \eta}$ where $\eta$ is the viscosity of the solution. Inserting this into (9) gives an estimate for $k_D$ as $\frac{8 RT}{3\eta}$, where R is the gas constant, and $\eta$ is given in centipoise:

Solvents and $k_D$
Solvent	Viscosity (centipoise)	$k_D (\frac{\times 1e9}{M\cdot s})$
n-Pentane	0.24	27
Hexadecane	3.34	1.9
Methanol	0.55	11.8
Water	0.89	7.42
Toluene	0.59	11

== See also ==
- Diffusion limited enzyme
