= Zoonoses and Public Health =

- Discipline: Infectious diseases Public health Veterinary medicine
- Language: English
- Edited by: Randall Singer

Publication details
- Former name(s): Zentralblatt für Veterinärmedizin Reihe B Journal of Veterinary Medicine Series B-Infectious Diseases and Veterinary Public Health
- History: 1963–present
- Publisher: John Wiley & Sons
- Frequency: 8/year
- Open access: Hybrid
- Impact factor: 2.702 (2020)

Standard abbreviations
- ISO 4: Zoonoses Public Health

Indexing
- CODEN: ZPHOAH
- ISSN: 1863-1959 (print); 1863-2378 (web)
- LCCN: 2007212720
- OCLC no.: 85888986

Links
- Journal homepage; Online access; Online archive

Zoonoses and Public Health is a peer-reviewed medical journal covering zoonoses – infectious diseases transmitted from animals to humans – and their potential public health consequences. It was established in 1963 as Zentralblatt für Veterinärmedizin Reihe B, which was one of the three sections formed by the split of the journal Zentralblatt für Veterinärmedizin. It was renamed Journal of Veterinary Medicine Series B: Infectious Diseases and Veterinary Public Health in 2000 and obtained its current name in 2007. It is published eight times per year by John Wiley & Sons and the editor-in-chief is Randall Singer (University of Minnesota). According to the Journal Citation Reports, the journal has a 2020 impact factor of 2.702, ranking it 64th out of 93 journals in the category "Infectious Diseases".
