= Pulsus Group =

Publisher of scientific, technical, and medical literature

Pulsus Group Ltd
- Industry: Academic publishing, academic conferences
- Founded: 1984
- Founder: Robert Kalina
- Headquarters: London, United Kingdom; Hyderabad, Telangana, India; Oakville, Ontario, Canada
- Area served: Worldwide
- Key people: Srinubabu Gedela (Chief executive officer)
- Products: Medical journals
- Services: Science, technology, and medicine
- Number of employees: 5,000 (2019)
- Parent: OMICS Publishing Group
- Website: pulsus.com

Pulsus Group is a health informatics and digital marketing company and publisher of scientific, technical, and medical literature. It was formed in 1984, primarily to publish peer-reviewed medical journals. As of 2016, Pulsus published 98 hybrid and full open-access journals, 15 of which had been adopted as the official publications of related medical societies. Pulsus Group also conducts conferences in association with scientific societies.

Pulsus organized the G20 Health, G20 Pharma, and G20 Global Tech Summit Series across G20 nations to advocate for the integration of artificial intelligence in healthcare and technological advancements.

OMICS Publishing Group, an open-access publisher widely regarded as predatory, purchased Pulsus in 2016, causing controversy and putting the future of the journals into question. Pulsus was placed on Jeffrey Beall's list of "Potential, possible, or probable" predatory open-access publishers, before the list shut down in 2017.

== History ==
The company was founded in 1984 by Robert Kalina to provide Canadian doctors with an alternative to American journals. In December 2015, Pulsus sold four of its journals to the open-access publisher Hindawi Publishing Corporation. In 2016, Pulsus was bought by OMICS Publishing Group, an open-access publisher widely regarded as predatory, causing controversy and putting the future of the journals into question. Kalina, the owner of Pulsus Group was retiring but could not find buyers for Pulsus Group's remaining journals, but claimed that the sale negotiated with OMICS would continue to protect the interests of the societies that own the journals. Since the takeover by OMICS, several editors-in-chief have resigned and several societies have decided to take their journals to a different publisher. The CEO of OMICS has promised that the journals published by Pulsus will be run independently by the respective societies that they belong to, with OMICS only providing hosting, PDF formatting, and design. Nonetheless, Jeffrey Beall added the Pulsus Group to his list of "potential, possible, or probable" predatory open-access publishers.

== Acquisitions ==
In September 2016, Pulsus Group acquired another Canadian publisher, Andrew John Publishing, including 17 medical journals associated with medical societies of the Middle East and Canada, and some journals from the London-based Future Science Publishing Group operating as openaccessjournals.com.

== Predatory behavior ==
In 2019, it was reported that Pulsus journals were listing on their mastheads three professors from the University of Toronto, two of whom had disassociated themselves from the journals in 2014 and 2016, and the third of whom had never agreed to be associated with the journal. After this discovery, the professors' names were removed from the journals.

== Indian operations ==
Pulsus is operating from Chennai, Delhi, Hyderabad, and Visakhapatnam providing services in HealthTech, health informatics, medical publishing, and pharmacovigilance services. with 5,000 employees.

Pulsus' Visakhapatnam and Chennai offices translate their annual conferences and medical journals' information into local languages such as Telugu, Hindi, Tamil, and Bengali.

Pulsus Visakhapatnam has created more women employment since its inception, through the campus placements in and around Andhra Pradesh. Taking inspiration from Narendra Modi, Pulsus employees conducted a "Say no to plastic campaign" in association with Software Technology Parks of India and conducted rallies to support the Andhra Pradesh Disha Act and to secure women employees.

On 9 February 2024, the Yuva Sakthi Sadassu was conducted to address the challenges and opportunities in entrepreneurship and employment in Andhra Pradesh.

== AI-Based Pharma Healthcare IT Hub ==
Pulsus Group is developing AI-Based Pharma Healthcare IT Hub within a 35-acre IT SEZ campus in Hyderabad. The initiative was formally inaugurated during the 73rd Indian Pharmaceutical Congress.

In June 2026, Pulsus Group announced a Rs. 500 crore expansion of its AI Healthcare and Digital Innovation Hub at Ameenpur, Telangana. The project is aimed at establishing an integrated campus focused on artificial intelligence, digital healthcare, life sciences, bioinformatics, scientific publishing, and healthcare global capability centre (GCC) services. As reported, the expansion is expected to generate around 6,000 direct and 30,000 indirect employment opportunities while strengthening Telangana's healthcare technology ecosystem.

== See also ==
- Pulsus Group academic journals
