= Future Medicine =

British academic publisher

Future Medicine Ltd
- Industry: Academic publishing
- Headquarters: Unitec House, 2 Albert Place, London, N3 1QB, UK
- Website: www.futuremedicine.com

Future Medicine is a privately owned company based in London, England, United Kingdom. It is part of Future Science Publishing Group, primarily to publish peer-reviewed medical journals. Future Medicine publishes hybrid and full open access journals.

== Business model ==
Future Medicine publishes open access or subscription journals, which are owned by the respective societies they serve. The open access journals require authors to pay an article processing charge. The company also provides an accelerated publication option, with speedy processing and publication of accepted articles within 6 weeks of submission.

== Journals ==
In 2016, the company sold several of its journals to OMICS Publishing Group, who moved them to Pulsus Group, a company they recently acquired. OMICS is widely regarded as predatory publisher.

The journals sold were

- Clinical Practice
- Diabetes Management
- Imaging in Medicine
- International Journal of Clinical Rheumatology
- Interventional Cardiology
- Neuropsychiatry
