= Hindawi (publisher) =

Scientific and medical journal publisher

- Parent company: Wiley
- Status: Inactive
- Founded: 1997
- Founder: Ahmed Hindawi
- Country of origin: Egypt
- Headquarters location: London
- Distribution: Worldwide
- Publication types: Scientific journals
- No. of employees: 42 (in 2019)
- Official website: www.hindawi.com

Hindawi was a publisher of peer-reviewed, open access, scientific journals active in scientific, technical, and medical (STM) literature. It was founded in 1997 in Cairo, Egypt, and purchased in 2021 for $298 million by John Wiley & Sons, a large US-based publishing company.

By 2022, Hindawi was publishing over 250 journals, including 64 journals indexed within the Science Citation Index Expanded, and 1 journal indexed within the Social Sciences Citation Index, with a total of 64 journals ranked with an impact factor. Since 2007, all of Hindawi's journals have been open access and published under a Creative Commons Attribution License (CC-BY).

The quality of peer review at a number of Hindawi journals has been criticized. In 2010, Hindawi was classified as a possible predatory publisher by Jeffrey Beall, but was removed from the list following a successful appeal. Over the next years, the number of articles in Hindawi journals grew exponentially, the majority being published in special issues. In 2023 and after over 7000 article retractions in Hindawi journals related to the publication of articles originating from paper mills, Wiley announced that it would cease using the Hindawi brand and integrate Hindawi's 200 remaining journals into its main portfolio. The Wiley CEO who initiated the Hindawi acquisition stepped down in the wake of those announcements.

== History ==
The Hindawi Publishing Corporation was founded in 1997 in Cairo by Ahmad Hindawi and his wife Nagwa Abdel-Mottaleb. The company's first journal was the International Journal of Mathematics and Mathematical Sciences, which it acquired from a prior publisher. By 2006 Hindawi Publishing owned 48 journals and had about 220 employees. It published journals in the physical and life sciences and medical research. In February 2007, Hindawi moved to a complete open access model on all of its journals. By 2007, Hindawi was publishing around 100 journals, 21 of which were ISI-listed, and claimed to be second largest publisher in PubMed Central, a biomedical and life sciences open access journal repository. The company advertised a 40% article acceptance rate. Article publication fees averaged $800, varying by journal and page count, being significantly less than prices charged by major open access competitors including BioMed Central and the Public Library of Science.

Two corporations acted under the name of Hindawi: Hindawi Limited, based in London, and Hindawi Publishing Corporation (HPC), based in Cairo. The original publishing company, Hindawi Publishing Corporation, was founded in Cairo in 1997 by Ahmed Hindawi and Nagwa Abdelmottaleb but later acted merely as a publishing services provider to Hindawi Ltd. Hindawi Ltd was founded in London in 2013 by Ahmed Hindawi and had acquired all the assets and intellectual property of Hindawi Publishing Corporation by 2017.

In January, 2021, John Wiley & Sons acquired Hindawi Limited for an enterprise value of $298 million.

In the fall of 2022, Hindawi announced the retraction of more than 500 articles in 16 of its scientific journals because of cheating involving some of its editors and peer reviewers. By the end of 2023, the number of retractions in Hindawi journals had increased to over 7,000 and Wiley announced that it would discontinue the Hindawi brand and operate the journals under a new approach. The Wiley CEO who initiated the Hindawi acquisition stepped down in the wake of the bad news.

In May 2023, Hindawi closed four journals. Wiley shuttered another 19 former Hindawi journals the following year.

== Assessment of Hindawi journals ==
Between 2009 and 2011, the number of Hindawi journals nearly doubled, and Hindawi's output increased from 2,500 to 13,000 articles per year. (Note: based on projections from the first 8 months of 2011) By 2011, Hindawi was publishing 300 journals, and had a staff of over 450 people. The growth of the company has come from publishing new start-up journals, as well as acquisitions of established journals such as Psyche, an entomological journal founded in 1874. Two major factors facilitating the company's growth have been the low labor costs and well-educated middle class of Cairo. As of April 2019 Hindawi's publishing portfolio includes 233 journals.

As of April 2023, the Norwegian Scientific Index lists 195 Hindawi journals, one of which are level X (dubious i.e. possibly predatory), 18 marked level 0 (not academic), the rest marked level 1 (standard academic).

In March 2023, multiple Hindawi journals were delisted from the Web of Science for concerns with their editorial practices.

=== Assessments and responses to controversial articles ===
In 2010, a subset of Hindawi journals were included in a list of suspected predatory open access publishers by Jeffrey Beall; however Beall later removed Hindawi from his list after re-evaluating the company, calling it a "borderline case". Beall has also criticized Hindawi for representing the offshoring of scholarly publishing, a view which has been criticized as neocolonialist.

Some light probes of the editorial quality of the review process of Hindawi publications using sting operations uncovered no obvious problems. In 2013, the two Hindawi journals (Chemotherapy Research and Practice and ISRN Oncology) targeted in the Who's Afraid of Peer Review? sting operation rejected the fake paper. Similarly, the Hindawi journal Advances in Medicine was included as a target of a 2017 sting operation with a Star Wars–themed fake research paper and rejected the paper.

In 2014, three Hindawi journals faced delisting from Journal Citation Reports for anomalous citation patterns, particularly within journal self-citations and an excess of between-journal reciprocal citations. The three journals include The Scientific World Journal, although the problems with this journal occurred partly before Hindawi acquired the journal. Open access journalist Richard Poynder considered this incident anomalous in and of itself, and Retraction Watch has noted that Hindawi's sanctions for authors who manipulate citations – including 3-year bans of author submissions – are stricter than those of many other journals.

In 2015, after an internal investigation, Hindawi flagged 32 published papers for re-review due to three editors subverting the peer review process with fake email accounts.

In an opinion written in 2016, academic publishing critic Leonid Schneider compared Hindawi to another open access publishing group Frontiers Media, concluding overall: "It seems therefore, the Egyptian Hindawi is a traditionally-operated academic publisher like any other, be it OA or subscription one."

In 2018 a Hindawi journal, Journal of Environmental and Public Health, published an epidemiological paper on glioblastoma, none of the authors of which had academic appointments. The paper was accompanied by a press release that overstated the results of the paper in media interviews by the authors, and exaggerated the importance of findings with respect to the hypothesis that cell phones are dangerous.

In December 2020, the Chinese Academy of Sciences published a list of journals that may suffer from issues of scientific quality and other risk characteristics. There were four Hindawi group journals in the 65 journals given in its initial list. The list was updated in December 2021 and reduced to only 41 journals, of which six Hindawi journals were included: Complexity, Shock and Vibration, Advances in Civil Engineering, Scientific Programming, Discrete Dynamics in Nature and Society, Journal of Mathematics (list of Hindawi academic journals).

In January 2023, Zhejiang Gongshang University (浙江工商大学) in Hangzhou, China, announced it would no longer include articles published in Hindawi, MDPI, and Frontiers journals when evaluating researcher performance.

In 2023, several concerns about the linkage of some Hindawi's journals (e.g. Mathematical Problems in Engineering) with research paper mills were noted. After that, Wiley detected paper mill signs on 10–13% of papers in Hindawi. In 2023, Hindawi has retracted over 8,000 articles, exceeding the total number of retractions from all publishers combined in any prior year.

== Business model ==
Hindawi charges authors an article processing charge. The charges vary by journal and are lower on average than other large open-access publishers. By 2012, the company had a profit margin of around 50%, higher than the 2008 average of 35% for commercial publishers.

Most Hindawi journals do not have editors-in-chief, but rather have editorial boards consisting of administrative staff and a volunteer board of 30 to 300 scholars. There is some concern that this style may lead to lower quality output, or at least the potential for it. However, web journalist Poynder, in the lead to a 2012 long interview of Ahmed Hindawi, said "there is no evidence that Hindawi's editorial approach, or the way in which it recruits authors, has had any serious consequences so far as the quality of its papers is concerned," although he notes that some articles contain poor copy-editing. At least one Hindawi journal (Pain Research and Management) had an editor-in-chief.

Hindawi was also criticized for its use of unsolicited e-mail, with some claiming it was the chief method of attracting manuscripts and editorial board members. However, others claim that e-mail spam from many publishers is increasing, with open access advocate Stevan Harnad of the University of Southampton stating that while the practice should be frowned upon:

I think it's true that Hindawi spams no more than other legitimate businesses and organizations spam today. That may not be an admirable standard but it's a realistic one. In this context, Hindawi's promotional messages don't deserve to be singled out for stigmatization.

== See also ==
- Academic publishing
- Open Access Scholarly Publishers Association, of which Hindawi is a founding member
