= Susanna Every-Palmer =

New Zealand forensic psychiatrist and academic

Academic background
- Education: University of Otago, University of Oxford
- Thesis: Clozapine and the gastrointestinal tract (2019)
- Doctoral advisor: Pete M Ellis, Stephen J. Inns

Academic work
- Institutions: Capital and Coast District Health Board, University of Otago

Susanna Every-Palmer is a New Zealand academic and forensic psychiatrist, and is a full professor at the University of Otago, specialising in mental health and achieving better outcomes for people with schizophrenia.

== Academic career ==
Every-Palmer has a master's degree in evidence-based medicine from the University of Oxford. In 2008, she was awarded RANZCP Fellowship and gained an Advanced Certificate in Forensic Psychiatry two years later. In 2019, Every-Palmer completed a PhD titled Clozapine and the gastrointestinal tract at the University of Otago, having been awarded the University of Otago PhD Research Prize for Clinical Research in 2018. Every-Palmer is on the faculty of the University of Otago, and rose to full professor in 2023. As of 2024, Every-Palmer is the Head of the Department of Psychological Medicine at University of Otago.

Every-Palmer has been Deputy Director of Mental Health at the Ministry of Health and Director of the Central Regional Forensic Services. As of 2024 she chairs the New Zealand Committee of the Royal Australian and New Zealand College of Psychiatrists and is a Board Member of both the Council of Medical Colleges and Pacific Rim College of Psychiatry.

Every-Palmer's research focuses on evidence-based mental health care. She led research that showed better immediate and longer-term outcomes for emergency mental health call-outs when co-response models were used, that is, when police and ambulance responders were accompanied by mental health services. She has also published on how the mental health of politicians is affected by harassment. In 2021, the Royal Commission of Inquiry into Abuse in Care held an 11-day hearing on the abuse of children that occurred at the Lake Alice Child and Adolescent Unit. Together with Oliver Sutherland, who was one of the first whistleblowers of the abuse, Every-Palmer has written about the implications for modern psychiatry arising from the Commission's findings.

== Selected works ==
- Susanna Every-Palmer; Matthew Jenkins; Philip Gendall; et al. (4 November 2020). "Psychological distress, anxiety, family violence, suicidality, and wellbeing in New Zealand during the COVID-19 lockdown: A cross-sectional study". PLOS One. 15 (11) e0241658. doi:10.1371/JOURNAL.PONE.0241658. ISSN 1932-6203. PMC 7641386. PMID 33147259.
- Susanna Every-Palmer (11 February 2011). "Synthetic cannabinoid JWH-018 and psychosis: an explorative study". Drug and Alcohol Dependence. 117 (2–3): 152–157. doi:10.1016/J.DRUGALCDEP.2011.01.012. ISSN 0376-8716. PMID 21316162.
- Susanne E Palmer; Rachael M McLean; Peter M Ellis; Mira Harrison-Woolrych (1 May 2008). "Life-threatening clozapine-induced gastrointestinal hypomotility: an analysis of 102 cases". The Journal of Clinical Psychiatry. 69 (5): 759–768. doi:10.4088/JCP.V69N0509. ISSN 0160-6689. PMID 18452342.
- Susanna Every-Palmer; Jeremy Howick (12 May 2014). "How evidence-based medicine is failing due to biased trials and selective publication". Journal of Evaluation in Clinical Practice. 20 (6): 908–914. doi:10.1111/JEP.12147. ISSN 1356-1294. PMID 24819404.
- Susanna Every-Palmer; Justin Barry-Walsh; Michele Pathé (7 May 2015). "Harassment, stalking, threats and attacks targeting New Zealand politicians: A mental health issue". Australian and New Zealand Journal of Psychiatry. 49 (7): 634–641. doi:10.1177/0004867415583700. ISSN 0004-8674. PMC 4511987. PMID 25954019.
- Philip Gendall; Janet Hoek; James Stanley; Mathew Jenkins; Susanna Every-Palmer (4 May 2021). "Changes in Tobacco Use During the 2020 COVID-19 Lockdown in New Zealand". Nicotine & Tobacco Research. 23 (5): 866–871. doi:10.1093/NTR/NTAA257. ISSN 1462-2203. PMC 7928623. PMID 33515223.
- Susanna Every-Palmer; Oliver Sutherland (September 2023). "Abuses in psychiatric care: The shameful story of the Lake Alice Child and Adolescent unit in Aotearoa New Zealand". Australian and New Zealand Journal of Psychiatry. 57 (9): 1193–1197. doi:10.1177/00048674231193381. ISSN 0004-8674. PMC 10466991. PMID 37547982.
