= Postprandial glucose test =

Medical test

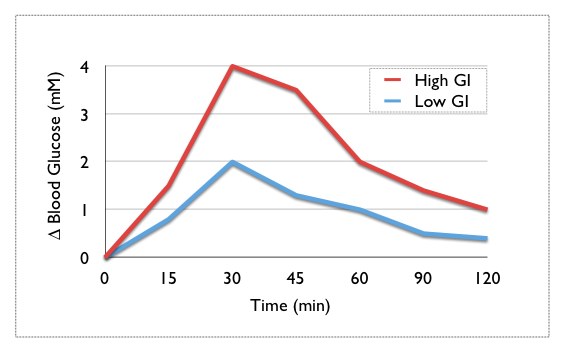
- Changes in blood glucose over time following a high and low glycemic index (GI) carbohydrate.
- Purpose: determines the amount of a type of sugar after a meal

A postprandial glucose (PPG) test is a blood glucose test that determines the amount of glucose in the plasma after a meal. The diagnosis is typically restricted to postprandial hyperglycemia due to lack of strong evidence of co-relation with a diagnosis of diabetes.

The American Diabetes Association does not recommend a PPG test for determining diabetes, but it notes that postprandial hyperglycemia does contribute to elevated glycated hemoglobin levels (a primary factor behind diabetes) and recommends testing and management of PPG levels for those patients who maintain optimum pre-prandial blood glucose levels but have high A1C values.

Carbohydrates in the form of glucose are one of the main constituents of foods, and assimilation starts within about 10 minutes. The subsequent rate of absorption of carbohydrates in conjunction with the resultant rates of secretion of insulin and glucagon secretion affects the time-weighed PPG profile.

In non-diabetic individuals, levels peak at about an hour after the start of a meal, rarely exceed 140 mg/dl, and return to preprandial levels within 2–3 hours. These time-profiles are heavily altered in diabetic patients.

Typically, PPG levels are measured about 2 hours after the start of the meal, which corresponds to the time-span in which peak values are typically located, in case of diabetic patients.

In 2011, the International Diabetes Federation noted elevated PPG levels to be an independent risk factor for macrovascular disease; this had been since challenged on previous grounds and that PPG might be simply a marker or a surrogate of a complex series of metabolic events occurring in the postprandial period, that is already better reflected through other parameters. A detailed 2001 review by the American Diabetes Association had earlier noted that correlations of PPG values with other diabetics parameters were often understudied and widely variant, whilst chronic diabetes-related complications have been demonstrated over a too-broad range of PPG values, to be independently attributed to; the 2018 Standards of Medical Care in Diabetes follows the same theme roughly. A 2019 review in Obesity Reviews was similar and noted inconclusive data as to the importance of PPG as a standalone parameter in diabetes diagnosis and management; it went on to propose a hyperglycemia-diabetes-CVD continuum and also criticized the lack of rigid standardization of a PPG test.

Reference works have recommended a peak postprandial glucose level of 140 mg/dl for any adult below 50 years of age, whilst raising it to 150 mg/dl and 160 mg/dl for patients aged between 50 and 60 years and more than sixty years, respectively.

== See also ==
- OGTT
- Postprandial dip
- Oxyhyperglycemia
- postcibalome
