= Society for Research on Nicotine and Tobacco =

US-based nonprofit organization

Society for Research on Nicotine and Tobacco (SRNT)
- Formation: 1994; 32 years ago
- Type: professional association
- Headquarters: Madison, Wisconsin
- Location: United States
- Official language: English
- Website: srnt.org

The Society for Research on Nicotine and Tobacco (SRNT) is an international nonprofit organization and professional association founded in 1994 which studies and shares research on nicotine and tobacco use from a public health and scientific perspective. It is the largest organization focused on nicotine and tobacco, with members in 40 countries.

== History ==
The Society for Research on Nicotine and Tobacco (SRNT) was founded in 1994. a time during which the majority of US states started litigation against the tobacco industry, mounting in the Tobacco Master Settlement Agreement.

Work from SRNT members was noted in public discussion leading up to the 2009 Family Smoking Prevention and Tobacco Control Act in the United States and SRNT is cited as an expert source in the Act.

== Organisation ==
The SRNT has its own official scientific journal, Nicotine & Tobacco Research, founded in 1999 and published by Oxford University Press.

The SRNT hosts SRNT University, a "collection of organized, curated training, scientific articles, and tools and resources for people working in Nicotine & Tobacco Research and related professions."

The SRNT does not accept funding from the "commercial tobacco industry". The definition does not extend to manufacturers of nicotine products that do not contain tobacco leaf.

The organization does accept funding from pharmaceutical companies that make medications to help people quit smoking.

== Work ==
The SRNT’s work has been used by the World Health Organization and governments in setting policies on topics such as tobacco advertising, taxation, smoke-free laws, and smoking cessation. The SRNT has been particularly active in work on the Tobacco Master Settlement Agreement (adopted in 1998) in the United States and on the WHO Framework Convention on Tobacco Control (adopted on 2003).

The society and its members have been involved in the debate on tobacco harm reduction, the safety and prevalence of e-cigarettes, and other public health issues.

In 2026, they managed to propose e-cigarettes for smoking cessation in JAMA.

== Fellows ==
In 2016, the Society began an annual Fellowship programme, designed to be "prestigious but not elitist". The first fellows were elected in 2017. Notable fellows include:

- Nii Addy
- Belinda Borrelli
- Jonathan Bricker
- Frank Chaloupka
- Sue Curry
- Janet Hoek
- Caryn Lerman
- Marcus Munafò
- Ann McNeill
- Marina Picciotto
- Ovide F. Pomerleau
- Jonathan Samet
- Rachel Tyndale
- Melanie Wakefield
- Natalie Walker
