= Rachael McLean =

New Zealand professor and physician

Academic background
- Education: University of Otago, University of Otago
- Thesis: Sodium in New Zealand: intake, consumer perceptions, and implications for chronic disease (2013)
- Doctoral advisor: Jim Mann, Sheila Williams, Janet Hoek

Rachael Mira McLean is a New Zealand public health physician and academic, and is a full professor at the University of Otago. Her research focuses on the public health consequences of nutritional and dietary choices, and includes the relationship between diet and chronic disease.

== Academic career ==
McLean completed a Master of Public Health followed by a PhD titled Sodium in New Zealand: intake, consumer perceptions, and implications for chronic disease at the University of Otago. McLean then joined the faculty of the Department of Preventative and Social Medicine at Otago, rising to associate professor in 2020 and full professor in 2024. McLean is a part of the Edgar National Centre for Diabetes Research.

McLean's research focuses on the environmental factors that affect people's dietary choices, and the relationship between diet and chronic diseases such as heart disease and diabetes. McLean's research on the measurement of salt intake has contributed to international best practice, and national and international dietary recommendations. She has called for a reduction in salt levels in food, to meet World Health Organisation targets. McLean was part of a research team that investigated 'traffic light' labels for salt in food, and found that such a labelling system would improve nutritional choices by New Zealand consumers. She has also explored the relationship between alcohol consumption and injury. McLean was part of a $2 million research programme, the Cancer Society Research Collaboration, funded by the Cancer Society. The collaboration between Otago, Massey University and Victoria University of Wellington was led by McLean, Janet Hoek, Diana Sarfati, Louise Signal, Sue Crengle, and Richard Egan, and aimed to reduce the 'incidence, impact, and inequities' of cancer in New Zealand.

McLean is on the board of trustees of St Clair School.

== Selected works ==
- NCD Risk Factor Collaboration (NCD-RisC); Erkin Mirrakhimov; Stergiou, George; et al. (2017). "Worldwide trends in body-mass index, underweight, overweight, and obesity from 1975 to 2016: a pooled analysis of 2416 population-based measurement studies in 128·9 million children, adolescents, and adults". The Lancet. 390 (10113): 2627–2642. doi:10.1016/s0140-6736(17)32129-3. PMC 5735219. PMID 29029897. Wikidata Q45370518.
- NCD Risk Factor Collaboration (NCD-RisC) (2019). "Rising rural body-mass index is the main driver of the global obesity epidemic in adults". Nature. 569 (7755): 260–264. doi:10.1038/s41586-019-1171-x. PMC 6784868. PMID 31068725. Wikidata Q64129210.
- McLean, Rachael Mira (2014). "Measuring population sodium intake: a review of methods". Nutrients. 6 (11): 4651–4662. doi:10.3390/nu6114651. PMC 4245554. PMID 25353661. Wikidata Q27001765.
- Susanne E Palmer; McLean, Rachael Mira; Peter M Ellis; Harrison, Mira (2008). "Life-threatening clozapine-induced gastrointestinal hypomotility: an analysis of 102 cases". The Journal of Clinical Psychiatry. 69 (5): 759–768. doi:10.4088/jcp.v69n0509. PMID 18452342. Wikidata Q34775493.
- NCD Risk Factor Collaboration (NCD-RisC); Nuhoğlu, İrfan; McLean, Rachael Mira (2020). "Repositioning of the global epicentre of non-optimal cholesterol". Nature. 582 (7810): 73–77. doi:10.1038/s41586-020-2338-1. PMC 7332422. PMID 32494083. Wikidata Q96132301.
