= Louise Signal =

New Zealand public health researcher

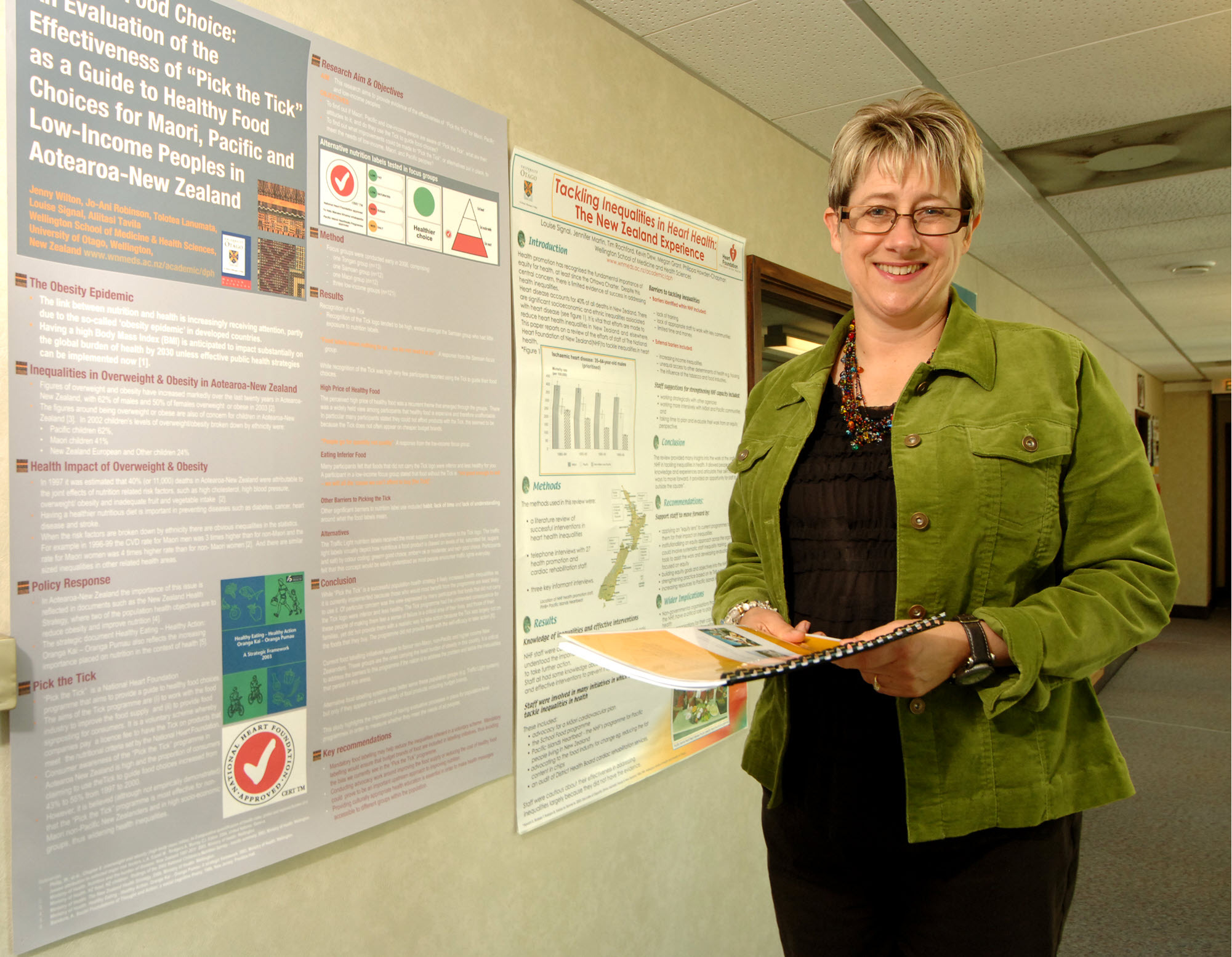

Academic background
- Education: Rangitikei College, University of Toronto, Massey University, University of Waikato
- Theses: An outcome evaluation of the Waikato Technical Institute's marae-based young persons' training programme (1983); The politics of the Ontario Premier's Council on Health Strategy: a case study in the new public health (1994)

Louise Nadine Signal is a New Zealand academic, and is a full professor at the University of Otago, specialising in researching public health policy and promotion, inequities in healthcare, and environmental determinants of health.

== Academic career ==
Signal has a Bachelor of Arts from Massey University, and a Master of Social Science from the University of Waikato, which she completed in 1983. Her master's thesis was on the evaluation of a marae-based training programme for young people. Signal then completed a PhD titled The politics of the Ontario Premier's Council on Health Strategy: a case study in the new public health. at the University of Toronto in 1994. Signal then joined the faculty of the University of Otago, rising to full professor in 2018. As of 2024, she is the Director of the Health Promotion and Policy Research Unit at the University of Otago, Wellington, and also Head of the Department of Public Health.

Signal's public health research focuses on environmental determinants of health, health promotion and policy, and health inequities, especially in low-income communities. She has investigated inequities in cancer treatment for Māori, exposure of children to harmful advertising, obesity prevention, and led a project in New Zealand and Tonga using automated cameras to record children's lives. Alongside colleagues Janet Hoek, Richard Egan and Christina McKerchar, Signal is Co-Director of the Te Rōpū Rangahau ō Te Kāhui Matepukupuku: Cancer Society Research Collaboration, a five-year research initiative aiming to reduce both the incidence of cancer and its impact, and also to address systemic inequities.

== Selected works ==
=== Book ===
- Louise Signal and Mihi Ratima (eds). Promoting Health in Aotearoa New Zealand. Otago University Press (2015) ISBN 9781877578823

=== Journal articles ===
- Teng, Andrea; Amanda C Jones; Anja Mizdrak; Signal, Louise; Murat Genç; Wilson, Nick (2019). "Impact of sugar-sweetened beverage taxes on purchases and dietary intake: Systematic review and meta-analysis". Obesity Reviews. 20 (9): 1187–1204. doi:10.1111/obr.12868. PMID 31218808. Wikidata Q92893410.
- Jenkin, Gabrielle L. S.; N Madhvani; Signal, Louise; S Bowers (2014). "A systematic review of persuasive marketing techniques to promote food to children on television". Obesity Reviews. 15 (4): 281–293. doi:10.1111/obr.12141. PMID 24433359. Wikidata Q38179071.
- L Thornley; J Ball; Signal, Louise; K Lawson-Te Aho; E Rawson (2014). "Building community resilience: learning from the Canterbury earthquakes". Kotuitui: New Zealand Journal Of Social Sciences Online. 10 (1): 23–35. doi:10.1080/1177083x.2014.934846. Wikidata Q124749858.
- Howden-Chapman, Philippa; Signal, Louise (December 1999). "Housing and health in older people - Ministry of Social Development". Social Policy Journal of New Zealand. 13. Ministry of Social Development.
- Maher, Anthony; Wilson, Nick; Signal, Louise; Thomson, George (2006). "Patterns of sports sponsorship by gambling, alcohol and food companies: an Internet survey". BMC Public Health. 6: 95. doi:10.1186/1471-2458-6-95. PMC 1459130. PMID 16608525. Wikidata Q33239653.
- Signal, Louise; J Stanley; M Smith; et al. (2017). "Children's everyday exposure to food marketing: an objective analysis using wearable cameras". International Journal of Behavioral Nutrition and Physical Activity. 14 (1): 137. doi:10.1186/s12966-017-0570-3. PMC 5632829. PMID 28988542. Wikidata Q42372913.
- Jenkin, Gabrielle L. S.; Signal, Louise; G Thomson (2011). "Framing obesity: the framing contest between industry and public health at the New Zealand inquiry into obesity". Obesity Reviews. 12 (12): 1022–1030. doi:10.1111/j.1467-789x.2011.00918.x. PMID 21831231. Wikidata Q37914947.
