= Itis =

Itis may refer to:

== Healthcare ==
- Inflammation
- Postprandial somnolence (colloquially "the itis"), a state of drowsiness or lassitude following a meal

== Information systems ==
- Integrated Taxonomic Information System, a partnership designed to provide consistent and reliable information on the taxonomy of biological species
- Integrated Transport Information System, a traffic management system in Klang Valley, Malaysia

== Places ==
- Itis (Swedish name of Iitti), a municipality in Päijänne Tavastia, Finland

== Other uses ==
- Itis shopping centre, a shopping centre in the district of Itäkeskus in East Helsinki, Finland
- "The Itis" (The Boondocks), the tenth episode of the Adult Swim animated television series, The Boondocks
