= Sleep induction =

Deliberate efforts to bring on sleep

Sleep induction is the deliberate effort to bring on sleep by various techniques or medicinal means, is practiced to lengthen periods of sleep, increase the effectiveness of sleep, and to reduce or prevent insomnia.

== Darkness and quiet ==
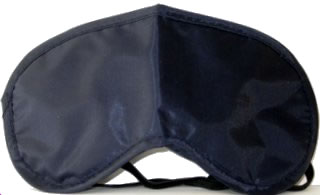
Blocking out light with a sleep mask may aid sleep

Dim or dark surroundings with a peaceful, quiet sound level are conducive to sleep. Retiring to a bedroom, drawing the curtains to block out daylight and closing the door are common methods of achieving this. When this is not possible, such as on an airplane, other methods may be used, such as masks and earplugs for sleeping which airlines commonly issue to passengers for this purpose.

== Activities ==
=== Guided imagery ===
To relax and encourage sleep, a meditation in the form of guided imagery may be used. The stereotypical method is by counting sheep, imagining sheep jumping over a fence, while counting them.

In most depictions of the activity, the person envisions an endless series of identical white sheep jumping over a fence, while counting the number that do so. The idea, presumably, is to induce boredom while occupying the mind with something simple, repetitive, and rhythmic, all of which are known to help humans sleep. It may also simulate REM sleep, tiring people's eyes.

According to a BBC experiment conducted by researchers at Oxford University, counting sheep is actually an inferior means of inducing sleep.

=== Hot bath ===
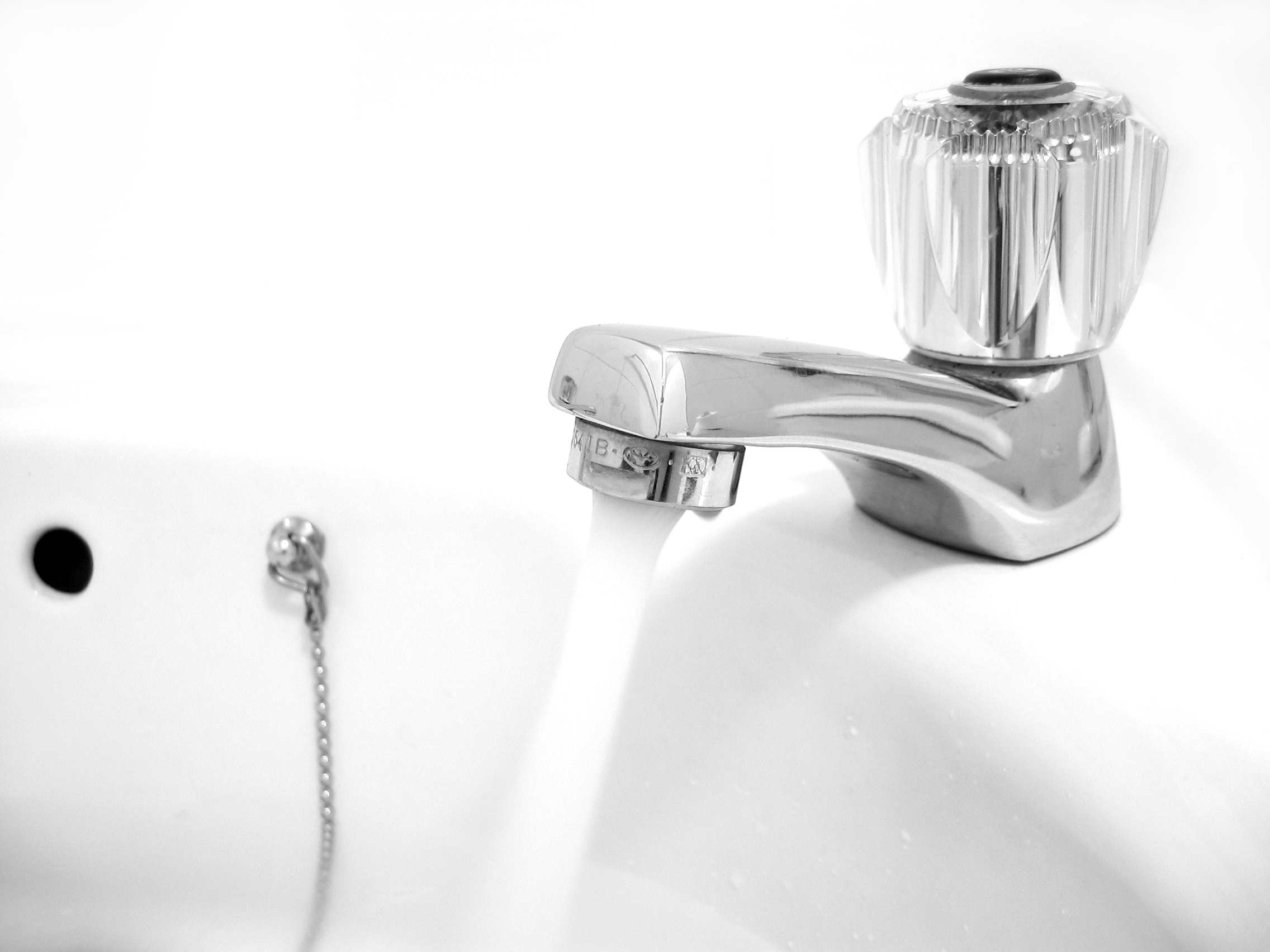
A hot bath before bed may improve the quality of sleep

The daily sleep/wake cycle is linked to the daily body temperature cycle. For this reason, a hot bath which raises the core body temperature has been found to improve the duration and quality of sleep. A 30-minute soak in a bath of 40 degrees Celsius (104 °F) – which raises the core body temperature by one degree – is suitable for this purpose.

A systematic review and meta-analysis of 17 different studies found that taking a warm bath or shower 1–2 hours before bedtime for as little as 10 minutes shortens the sleep onset time and improves sleep efficiency and subjective sleep quality and increases the amount of deep sleep.

=== Sex ===
Sexual intercourse, and specifically orgasm, may have an effect on the ability to fall asleep for some people. The period after orgasm (known as a refractory period) is often a time of increased relaxation, attributed to the release of the neurohormones oxytocin and prolactin.

=== Yawning ===
Yawning is commonly associated with imminent sleep, but it seems to be a measure to maintain arousal when sleepy and so it actually prevents sleep rather than inducing it. Yawning may be a cue that the body is tired and ready for sleep, but deliberate attempts to yawn may have the opposite effect of sleep induction.

== Sleeping pills ==
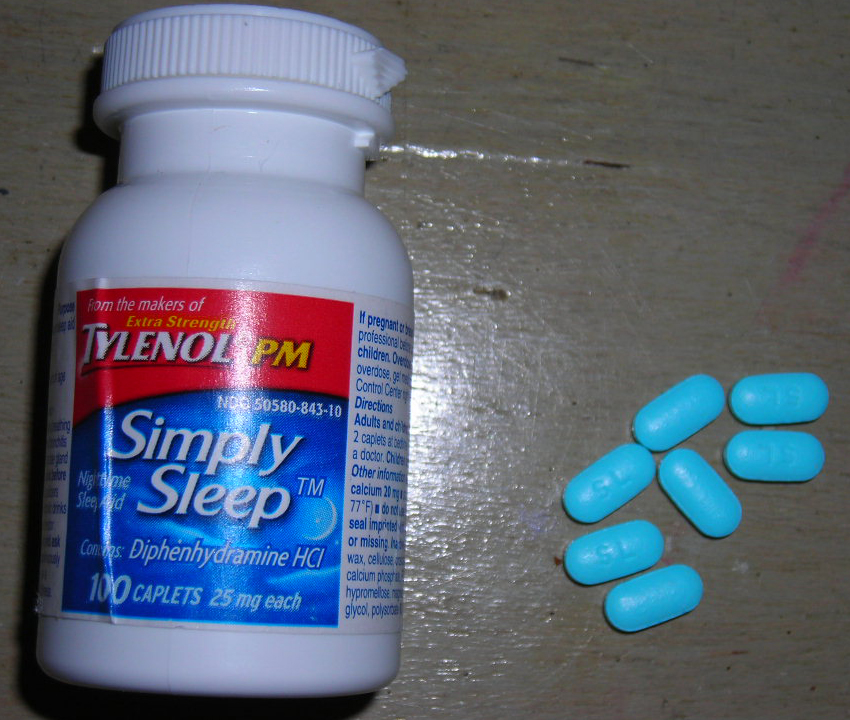
Sleeping pills utilizing diphenhydramine

Hypnotics, sometimes referred to as sleeping pills, may be prescribed by a physician, but their long-term efficacy is poor and they have numerous adverse effects including daytime drowsiness, accidents, memory disorders and withdrawal symptoms. If they are to be taken, the preferred choices are benzodiazepines with short-lasting effects such as temazepam or the newer Z-medicines such as zopiclone. Alternatively, in isolated cases sedatives such as barbiturates may be prescribed.

=== Nonprescription medications ===
A number of nonprescription medications have shown to be effective in promoting sleep. The amino acid tryptophan and its related compounds 5-HTP and melatonin, have common use, with the prescription medication ramelteon operating on the same biochemical pathway. The herb valerian can also be effective in gently inducing a relaxed state which is conducive to sleep.

== Food and drink ==
An urban legend states that certain foods such as turkey and bananas are rich in tryptophan and thus assist sleep, although this has not been confirmed by research.

=== Alcohol ===
An alcoholic drink or nightcap is a long-standing folk method which will induce sleep, as alcohol is a sedative. However, when the alcohol blood level subsides, there is a rebound effect: the person becomes more alert and so tends to wake up too soon. Also, if they continue to sleep, REM sleep is promoted, and this may cause vivid nightmares which can reduce the quality of the sleep.

=== Warm milk ===
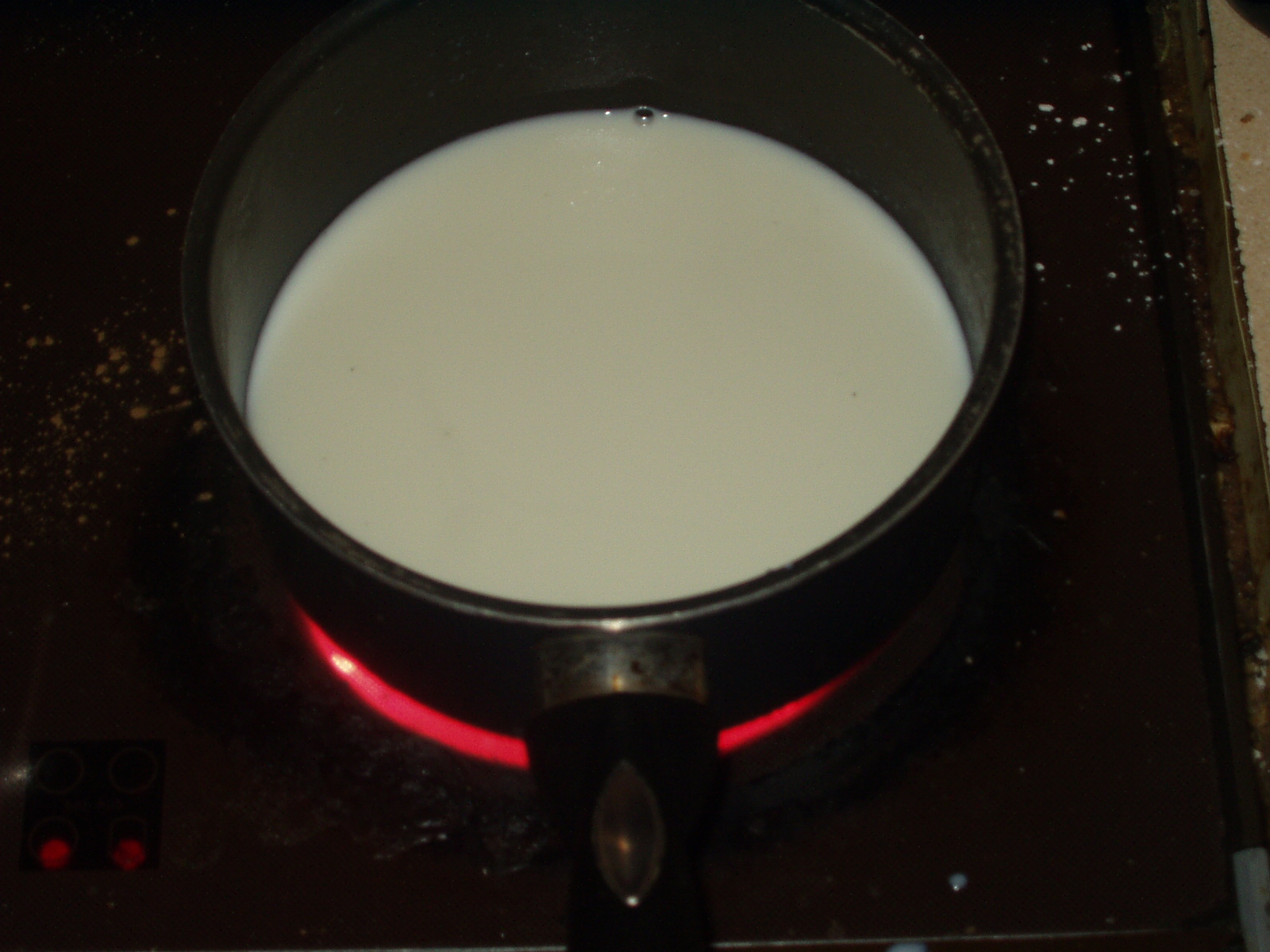
Milk being warmed on a stove

A cup of warm milk or a milk-based drink is traditionally used for sleep induction. Hot chocolate is also a traditional bedtime drink but this contains high levels of xanthines (caffeine and theobromine), which are stimulants and therefore may be counterproductive. Also, a pinch of turmeric powder with warm milk reduces stress and induces sleep. The flavor of the milk can be improved by adding honey and/or vanilla.

=== Aromatic plants ===
Volatile compounds from aromatic plants have also been investigated for sleep-promoting effects. A machine-learning study of 2,391 volatiles from 991 plants identified candidate compounds, four of five of which showed sleep-promoting effects in subsequent in vivo testing.

== See also ==
- Caffeine-induced sleep disorder
- Hypnotic induction
- Postprandial dip
- Postprandial somnolence
