= Rachel Maclean =

Rachel Maclean may refer to:

- Rachel Maclean (artist) (born 1987), Scottish artist
- Rachel Maclean (politician) (born 1965), British politician

== See also ==
- Murder of Rachel McLean, a 1991 UK murder case
- Rachael McLean, New Zealand public health physician and academic
