= Alcohol use and sleep =

Effects of alcohol consumption on sleep patterns

Alcohol use and sleep have a complex relationship. While alcohol may initially induce drowsiness, it can disrupt sleep quality and exacerbate sleep disorders in the long run. During abstinence, sleep disruption is one of the greatest predictors of relapse.

== Moderate alcohol consumption and sleep disruptions ==
Moderate alcohol consumption 30–60 minutes before bedtime results in disruptions in sleep maintenance and sleep architecture that are mediated by blood alcohol levels. Disruptions in sleep maintenance are most marked once alcohol has been completely metabolized from the body. Under conditions of moderate alcohol consumption where blood alcohol levels average 0.06–0.08% and decrease 0.01–0.02% per hour, an alcohol clearance rate of 4–5 hours would coincide with disruptions in sleep maintenance in the second half of an 8-hour sleep episode. In terms of sleep architecture, moderate doses of alcohol facilitate "rebounds" in rapid eye movement (REM) and stage 1 sleep; following suppression in REM and stage 1 sleep in the first half of an 8-hour sleep episode, REM and stage 1 sleep increase well beyond baseline in the second half. Moderate doses of alcohol also increase slow wave sleep (SWS) in the first half of an 8-hour sleep episode. Enhancements in REM sleep and SWS following moderate alcohol consumption are mediated by reductions in glutamatergic activity by adenosine in the central nervous system. In addition, tolerance to changes in sleep maintenance and sleep architecture develops within 3 days of alcohol consumption before bedtime.

== Alcohol consumption and sleep improvements ==
Low doses of alcohol (one 360.0 ml (13 imp fl oz; 12 US fl oz) beer) are sleep-promoting by increasing total sleep time and reducing awakenings during the night. The sleep-promoting benefits of alcohol dissipate at moderate and higher doses of alcohol (two 12 oz. beers and three 12 oz. beers, respectively). Previous experience with alcohol also determines whether or not alcohol is a "sleep promoter" or "sleep disrupter." Under free-choice conditions, in which subjects chose between drinking alcohol or water, inexperienced drinkers were sedated while experienced drinkers were stimulated following alcohol consumption. In insomniacs, moderate doses of alcohol improve sleep maintenance.

== Alcohol consumption and fatigue ==
Sleepiness influences the severity of alcohol consumption. Conditions of sleep deprivation encourage more episodes of alcohol consumption. Increased alcohol consumption during the winter months for Northern climate residents is attributed to escalations in fatigue.

== Alcohol abstinence and sleep disruptions ==
Sleep and hormonal disruptions following withdrawal from chronic alcohol consumption are the greatest predictors of relapse. During abstinence, recovering alcoholics have attenuated melatonin secretion in the beginning of a sleep episode, resulting in prolonged sleep latencies. Escalations in cortisol and core body temperatures during the sleep period contribute to poor sleep maintenance. Abstinent alcoholics tend to have lighter, more fragmented sleep than normal control subjects. Research indicates that it may take as long as one to two years for sleep to return to normal in abstinent alcoholics and that for some it may never return to normal.

== See also ==
- Nightcap (beverage)
- Short-term effects of alcohol consumption#Sleep
- Sleep induction#Alcohol
