= Prime Scholars =

- Status: active
- Distribution: Worldwide
- Publication types: Scientific journals
- Nonfiction topics: Science, medicine
- Official website: www.primescholars.com

Prime Scholars is an academic publisher of 56 open-access scientific journals. It is affiliated with OMICS Publishing Group and was listed on Beall's List of predatory journals. Notably, they have published several articles fraudulently using famous people as authors, despite those people having passed away long ago and not having ever been involved in any research (Charlotte Brontë, William Faulkner, and Walt Whitman, for example). The publisher has also been criticized for listing scientists as editor-in-chief of some of their journals, without the consent of those individuals. For example, the journal Current Neurobiology lists reputed neuroscientist Marina Picciotto as its editor-in-chief, who professed to be "appalled" by this identity theft. Prime Scholars has also published papers attributed to authors who did not actually write them, and refused to retract them when informed.

The company claims to be based in London, but the office at the address provided is where "hundreds of UK companies are incorporated".

== See also ==
- Predatory publishing
