= Jim Mann (scientist) =

New Zealand nutritionist and endocrinologist

Sir Jim Mann KNZM
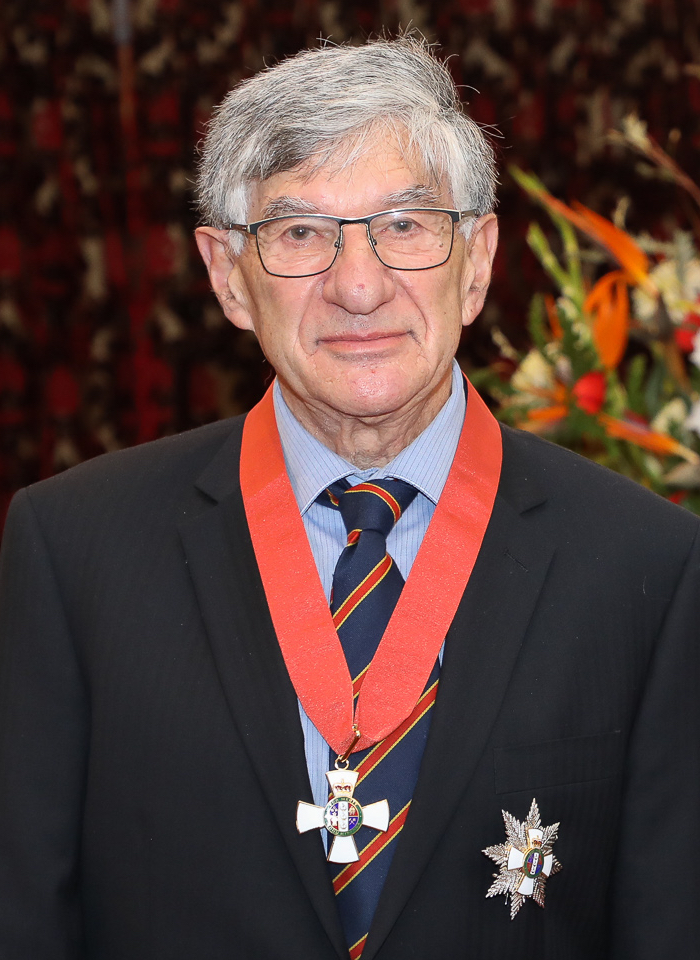
- Mann in 2022
- Born: Joel Ivor Mann; 30 September 1944 (age 82); George, Western Cape, South Africa
- Education: University of Cape Town
- Spouse: Helene Vicary Jones (m. 1978)
- Children: 2
- Scientific career
- Fields: Endocrinology, human nutrition
- Thesis: Some factors influencing serum triglyceride in man (1971)
- Doctoral students: Rachael McLean
- Website: University of Otago profile

Sir Joel Ivor Mann KNZM (born 30 September 1944), generally known as Jim Mann, is a New Zealand nutritionist and endocrinologist. He is professor in human nutrition and medicine at the University of Otago and consultant physician (endocrinology) at Dunedin Hospital. He has researched the role of lipids and carbohydrates in coronary heart disease, diabetes, and obesity, as well as the relationship between obesity and cancer. He was knighted in the 2022 New Year Honours.

== Early life, family, and education ==
Mann was born in George, Western Cape, South Africa, on 30 September 1944, the son of Pearl Mann (née Joseph) and Harry Bernard Mann. He studied at the University of Cape Town, graduating MB ChB in 1967, and PhD in 1971. The title of his doctoral thesis was Some factors influencing serum triglyceride in man. He then completed Master of Arts and Doctor of Medicine degrees at the University of Oxford in 1975.

On 28 January 1978, Mann married Helene Vicary Jones, and the couple went on to have two children.

== Career ==
Between 1975 and 1987, Mann was a university lecturer in social medicine at the University of Oxford, and concurrently a consultant physician at the John Radcliffe Hospital. He became a fellow of Wolfson College, Oxford in 1977.

In 1988, Mann moved to New Zealand where he was appointed professor of human nutrition and medicine at the University of Otago, and consultant physician (endocrinology) at Dunedin Hospital. He is also a director of the Edgar Diabetes and Obesity Research (EDOR, a World Health Organization Collaborating Centre for Human Nutrition at the University of Otago) and a principal investigator for the Riddet Institute at Massey University. In 2015 he was appointed director of Healther Lives – He Oranga Hauora, a National Science Challenge based at the University of Otago. One of Mann's notable doctoral students is Professor Rachael McLean.

=== Research ===
Mann and his team at the University of Otago carried out a major review for the World Health Organization (WHO) of the scientific evidence on sugar and weight gain, published in 2013 in the British Medical Journal. The review, which showed that sugar "unquestionably contributes to obesity", "informed WHO guidance on curbing sugar in the diet, leading to sugar taxes around the world."

Mann and his coworkers at Otago carried out a "landmark" review, commissioned by the WHO and published in The Lancet in 2019. The analysis of population epidemiological studies and feeding studies said that dietary fibre in "good" carbohydrates will cut people's chances of early death from a wide range of diseases including cardiovascular disease (heart disease), coronary heart disease, stroke, type 2 diabetes, colorectal cancer, breast cancer, reduction in body weight and cholesterol—increasing satiety and helping weight control and favourably influencing lipid and glucose levels. The report made examples of "good" carbohydrates being whole grain bread and oats, wholegrain cereals, pasta and bread, nuts and pulses and declared sugar a "bad" carbohydrate.

== Honours and awards ==
- Bristol-Myers Squibb/Mead Johnson Unrestricted Grant for Human Nutrition, Bristol-Myers Squibb Awards, Bristol-Myers Squibb / Mead Johnson
- 2002 – University of Otago Distinguished Research Medal
- 2002 – Appointed a Companion of the New Zealand Order of Merit, for services to medicine, in the 2002 Queen's Birthday and Golden Jubilee Honours
- 2004 – Sir Charles Hercus Medal of the Royal Society of New Zealand Te Apārangi
- 2005 – Distinguished Researcher Award from the University of Otago Dunedin School of Medicine
- 2012 – Himsworth Award from the Nutrition Group of the European Association for the Study of Diabetes

In the 2022 New Year Honours, Mann was promoted to knight companion.

== Selected publications ==
- Essentials of Human Nutrition. New York: Oxford University Press. Co-edited with Stewart Truswell. 1998; 2002, ISBN 0-19-850861-1; 2007, ISBN 978-0199290970; 2011, ISBN 978-0199566341; 2017 ISBN 9780198752981.
