= Nightcap (drink) =

Drink taken shortly before bedtime

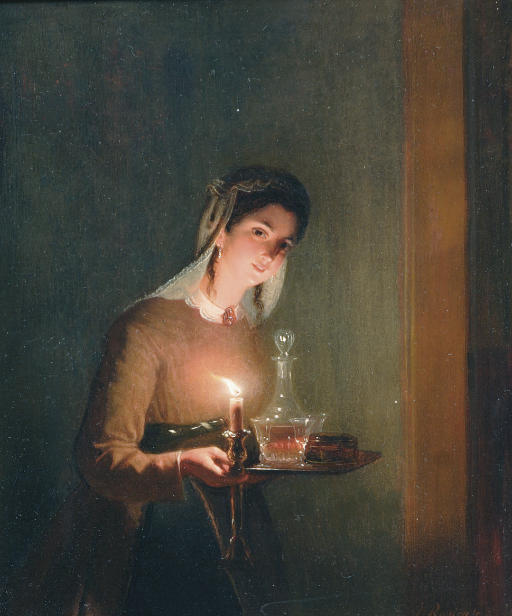
A Bedtime Drink by Dutch painter Johannes Rosierse (c. 1860)

A nightcap is a drink taken shortly before bedtime. For example, a small alcoholic beverage or glass of warm milk can supposedly promote a good night's sleep.

== Alcoholic nightcaps and sleep ==
In folk medicine consuming a nightcap is for the purpose of inducing sleep. Alcohol is not recommended by doctors as a sleep aid because it interferes with sleep quality. Some popular sleep medicines include 10% alcohol, although sleep-inducing effects of alcohol wears off after a few nights of consecutive use.

Nightcaps can be neat or mixed. They should not be served chilled or with ice, because a nightcap is supposed to induce a feeling of warmth. The hot toddy is usually considered the original nightcap. Other traditional nightcaps include brown liquor like brandy or bourbon, and cream liqueurs such as Irish cream. Wine, especially fortified, can also function as a nightcap. Since some nightcaps are made of amaro, a digestif, they are believed to also make settling into bed easier by promoting digestion.

== Non-alcoholic ==
A nightcap was originally alcoholic, since it warms drinkers and helps them sleep, just like the garment of the same name. Warm milk has also been used as a nightcap for inducing sleep, however its effectiveness is disputed.

Dentists and medical professionals advise against drinking milk before bed, as it contributes to tooth decay — caused by the prolonged exposure to lactose during one's sleep. Unless teeth are brushed after the consumption of a nightcap, the only recommended beverage before bed is plain water, and in small quantities to avoid the urge to urinate during the night.

In 1930, Ovaltine was advertised as "the world's best 'night-cap' to ensure sound, natural sleep", although such claims lack scientific basis.

== See also ==
- Apéritif and digestif
- Sleep hygiene
