= Sue Curry =

American health management and policy scholar

Susan J. Curry is an American health management and policy scholar. She retired from the University of Iowa in 2020 and is currently emerita dean and distinguished professor in the College of Public Health at the University of Iowa. She served as Interim Executive Vice President and Provost at University of Iowa from 2017 to 2019.

== Early life and education ==
Curry graduated from University of Massachusetts with a bachelor's degree in psychology. She continued her education at University of New Hampshire where she earned her PhD degree in psychology.

== Career ==
Curry has served as a principal investigator or co-investigator on 30 grants funded by NIH, CDC, and major foundations. Curry is a member of the Institute of Medicine and a fellow of both the Society of Behavioral Medicine and the American Psychological Association. She is the recipient of the John Slade Award, 2015 and the Excellence in Health Psychology Research Award, 2017. Curry has served on the executive committee of National Academy of Medicine Governing Council, as a member of National Research Council Governing Board and as a fellow of the American Psychological Association, Division 38 (Health Psychology) and Division 50 (Addictions) of the US Preventive Services Task Force.

== Professional honors ==
- Vice Chair of the Board of Directors of the American Legacy Foundation
- Member of the Board of Scientific Advisors for the National Cancer Institute
- Member, US Preventive Services Task Force, 2009–2014; Vice Chair, US Preventive Services Task Force, 2016–2018; Chair, 2018- 2019
- Former President, Society for Research in Nicotine and Tobacco, 2009–2010 .

== Awards ==
- American Society for Preventive Oncology, Joseph R. Cullen Memorial Award, 2000.
- Society of Behavioral Medicine, Distinguished Scientist Award, 2001.
- Society for Research in Nicotine and Tobacco, John Slade Award, 2015.
- Society for Health Psychology (APA Division 38) Award, Outstanding Contributions to Health Psychology by a Senior Professional, 2017.

== Selected publications ==
- Curry, Susan J., et al. "Behavioral weight loss interventions to prevent obesity-related morbidity and mortality in adults: US Preventive Services Task Force recommendation statement." Jama 320.11 (2018): 1163–1171.
- Curry, Susan, Edward H. Wagner, and Louis C. Grothaus. "Intrinsic and extrinsic motivation for smoking cessation." Journal of consulting and clinical psychology 58.3 (1990): 310.
