= Jonathan Bricker =

American clinical psychologist

Jonathan B. Bricker
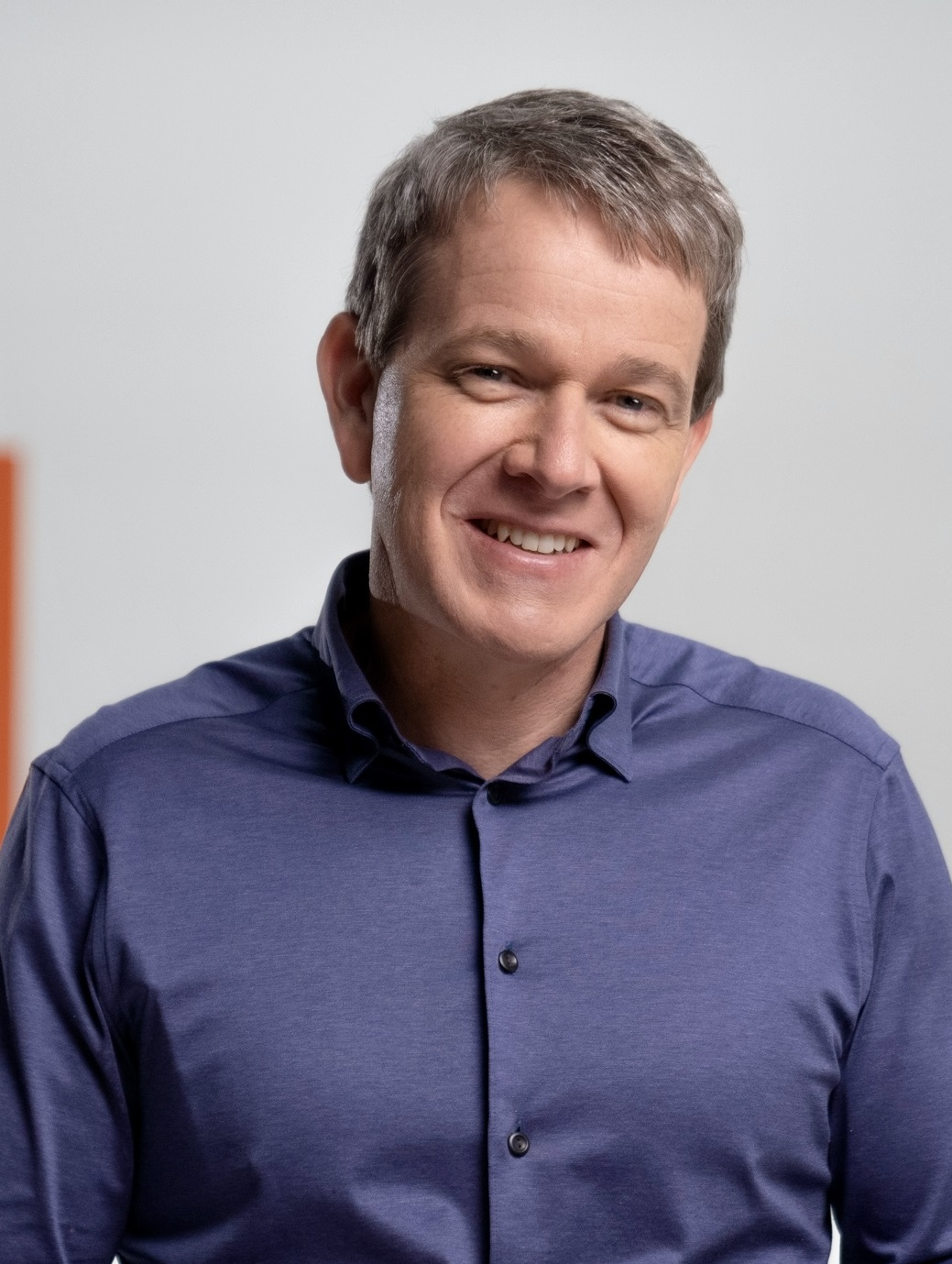
- Occupations: Clinical psychologist, academic and scientist

Academic background
- Education: B.A., Majors in Psychology and English Literature; M.S., Clinical Psychology; Ph.D., Clinical Psychology (Minor: Statistics)
- Alma mater: University of California, Berkeley, CA; University of Washington, Seattle, WA

Academic work
- Institutions: University of Washington (UW); Fred Hutchinson Cancer Center

Jonathan B. Bricker is an American clinical psychologist, academic, and scientist. He is a Full Professor in the Division of Public Health Sciences (PHS) at the Fred Hutchinson Cancer Center, an Affiliate Professor in the Department of Psychology, and a Member of the Graduate Faculty at the University of Washington. He is the founder and leader of the Health and Behavioral Innovations in Technology (HABIT) research lab at the Fred Hutch Cancer Center. Throughout his career, Bricker has led an NIH-funded clinical research team, provided clinical intervention and supervision, and given invited keynote lectures internationally on topics including behavioral interventions, tobacco cessation and substance addiction, and weight less.

Bricker's main contribution to science is in the novel translation of behavioral therapies into high-reach technologies that prevent cancer. He is most known for integrating Acceptance and Commitment Therapy (ACT) into AI-based chatbots, smartphone apps, websites, and telehealth interventions for preventing major causes of cancer: cigarette smoking and obesity. He and his research lab have conducted large randomized clinical trials testing these interventions, including a nationwide study of over 2500 participants funded by the National Institutes of Health which showed that the iCanQuit app was efficacious for quitting smoking. He has worked on adapting and testing these interventions for vulnerable populations, including American Indians and Alaska Natives, Blacks adults, Hispanic adults, and cancer patients. His research career began with the development and testing of a tool to measure air travel stress, followed by discoveries on the efficacy of proactive coaching to help teenagers stop smoking and on the long-term influences of parental behavior on their children's tobacco use.

== Education ==
Bricker earned his B.A. with majors in Psychology and English Literature from the University of California, Berkeley in 1997. He then obtained his M.S. in Clinical Psychology from the University of Washington (UW), in 1999, followed by his Ph.D. in Clinical Psychology from the same institution in 2003.

== Career ==
Bricker's research career began in 1997 as a clinical psychology PhD student at the University of Washington, mentored by Irwin Sarason, where his training focused on psychological research methods and treating addictions and anxiety disorders. While in graduate school, he conducted research on defining and measuring air travel stress and introduced the Air Travel Stress Scale, identifying three key components: anxious reactions to adverse events, anger towards passengers, and lack of trust in airlines/airports. His research compared this stress before and after the September 11, 2001 terrorist attacks, and he also found demographic differences in air travel stress components—providing insights for addressing air travel stress.

After completing his PhD in 2003, Bricker joined the faculty of the Fred Hutch Cancer Center in Seattle, Washington. His early research at the Fred Hutch focused on conducting longitudinal cohort studies examining social and psychological influences on youth and young adult smoking initiation and cessation. He also studied the impact of proactive telephone coaching to help teenagers stop smoking. In 2007, he began work on translating an intensive in-person clinical intervention called Acceptance and Commitment Therapy (ACT) into a brief program delivered through technologies. He and his HABIT research lab have designed and tested, through large randomized clinical trials, ACT-based programs delivered in brief telephone coaching, website, smartphone, and chatbot formats. These programs are being applied to tobacco control and weight loss. Since 2004, Bricker has been treating patients who suffer from anxiety disorders and addictions.

Through his longstanding affiliation with the University of Washington's Department of Psychology, Bricker has mentored graduate and undergraduate psychology students who have joined his HABIT lab. His mentoring has also included junior faculty and post-doctoral researchers at the Fred Hutch. Together, they have published many research articles.

Bricker has served as a regular member on grant review panels for the NIH's Center for Scientific Review, including chairing review panels focused on tobacco regulatory science and smoking cessation interventions for individuals with HIV. He is a fellow of scientific societies including the Association for Contextual Behavioral Science and the Society for Research on Nicotine and Tobacco, and serves as a Senior Editor of a leading scientific journal on substance abuse called Addiction.

Since 1999, Bricker's work has been featured in media outlets including The New York Times, Washington Post, CNN, TIME, and Newsweek. He has presented his research to the US Surgeon General, Centers for Disease Control, the First Lady of China (Madame Peng Liyuan), and the comedian and writer Trevor Noah.

=== Public health contributions ===
Bricker has disseminated his discoveries for broad public health impact, with his lab's digital interventions for quitting smoking. His self-help tools include his AI-based chatbot, QuitBot, and an online class on quitting smoking, while his iCanQuit program is distributed in the US as the "2Morrow Health" smartphone app through employee wellness programs and health insurance companies. His TEDx talk, "Secret To Self Control," which has over 8 million views, presented the ACT approach to smoking cessation and weight loss. His work has inspired health habit change methods featured in Nir Eyal's book, Indistractable.

Providing scientific advisory on government policies and programs has been another way Bricker's work has made public health impact. In 2015, he was a scientific advisor for the Washington State Senate Bill 6096, which was signed into law on June 30, 2015, as the Andy Hill Cancer Research Endowment Fund (CARE) to fund cancer research in Washington State. In 2019, he testified before the Washington State Legislature regarding House Bill 1074, advocating for raising the minimum age for purchasing cigarettes and vaping products to 21. Washington Governor Jay Inslee approved and signed the State's Tobacco 21 law into effect on April 5, 2019, in a ceremony at the Fred Hutch. At the Federal level, he served on the White House Cancer Moonshot for Smoking Cessation in June 2023, which later implemented broad programs for providing smoking cessation services to marginalized communities throughout the US.

== Selected articles ==
- Bricker, J.B. (2005). Development and evaluation of the Air Travel Stress Scale. Journal of Counseling Psychology, 52: 615–628.
- Bricker, J. B., Mull, K. E., Kientz, J. A., Vilardaga, R., Mercer, L. D., Akioka, K. J., & Heffner, J. L. (2014). Randomized, controlled pilot trial of a smartphone app for smoking cessation using acceptance and commitment therapy. Drug and alcohol dependence, 143, 87–94.
- Bricker, J.B., Watson, N.L., Mull, K.E., Sullivan, B.M., Heffner, J.L. (2020). Efficacy of Smartphone Applications for Cigarette Smoking Cessation: A Randomized Clinical Trial. JAMA Internal Medicine, 180: 1472–1480.
- Bricker, J.B., Mull, K.E., Sullivan, B.M., & Forman, E.M. (2021). Efficacy of telehealth acceptance and commitment therapy for weight loss: A randomized clinical trial. Transl Behav Med, 11: 1527–1536.
