= Postprandial dip =

Medical phenomenon after eating

In medicine and specifically endocrinology, postprandial dip is a term used to refer to mild hypoglycemia occurring after ingestion of a heavy meal.

The dip is thought to be caused by a drop in blood glucose resulting from the body's own normal insulin secretion, which in turn is a response to the glucose load represented by the meal. While postprandial dip is usually physiological after a generous meal, a very sharp or sustained drop in blood glucose may be associated with a disorder of glucose metabolism.

== See also ==
- Postprandial somnolence
- Postprandial glucose test
- Postcibalome
- Glucose metabolism
- Lateral hypothalamus
- Insulin resistance
- Hypoglycemia
- Oxyhyperglycemia
- Diabetes mellitus
