= Natalie Walker (academic) =

New Zealand professor of social and community health

Natalia Walker
- Awards: Fellow of the Society for Research on Nicotine and Tobacco

Academic background
- Education: Pukerua Bay School, Kāpiti College, Victoria University of Wellington, University of Otago, Wellington, University of Auckland
- Thesis: Epidemiological studies of leg ulcers in Auckland, New Zealand (2000)
- Doctoral advisor: Stephen MacMahon, Anthony Rodgers

Academic work
- Institutions: University of Auckland

Natalie K. Walker is a New Zealand-born academic and is the Director of the Flinders Clinical Trials Platform at Flinders University in Adelaide in Australia. The Platform supports trial research across the entirety of Flinders University. Walker joined Flinders University in March 2025. Prior to this, she was a Professor of Social and Community Health at the University of Auckland in Auckland in New Zealand, specialising in the reduction of harm from non-communicable diseases such as cardiovascular disease and cancer. Walker has an interest in smoking cessation but also researches on alcohol, cannabis and sugar.

== Academic career ==
After a Bachelor of Science and a Master of Science, Walker joined the faculty of the University of Auckland in 1995, first as a Research Fellow. She completed a PhD in medicine titled Epidemiological studies of leg ulcers in Auckland, New Zealand at the University of Auckland in 2000, and was later appointed to full professor. Walker is associate director of the Centre for Addiction Research, and leads addiction research in the National Institute for Health Innovation. She was also co-director of the Faculty Research Centre for Translational Health Research.

Walker's research focuses on respiratory and cardiovascular health, and the prevention and treatment of non-communicable diseases such as heart disease and cancer. She has a particular interest in smoking cessation, conducting community-based clinical trials to create evidence to inform policy decisions. Walker has researched reduced harm and replacement products, vapes, nicotine reduced products, and smokefree environments, and also researches other addictive substances such as cannabis, ibogaine and sugar. Her work has been published in The BMJ, JAMA, The Lancet and The New England Journal of Medicine.

Walker and Chris Bullen led a team that was awarded a Research Excellence Medal by the University of Auckland in 2018, for their work on ways to assist people quit smoking. She was elected a Fellow of the Society for Research on Nicotine and Tobacco in 2019.

== Selected works ==
- Rodgers, Anthony; Walker, Natalie; Schug, Stephan; et al. (2000). "Reduction of postoperative mortality and morbidity with epidural or spinal anaesthesia: results from overview of randomised trials". The BMJ. 321 (7275): 1493. doi:10.1136/bmj.321.7275.1493. PMC 27550. PMID 11118174. Wikidata Q34105313.
- Bullen, Christopher; Howe, Colin; Laugesen, Murray Brian; Hayden McRobbie; Parag, Varsha; Williman, Jonathan A.; Walker, Natalie (2013). "Electronic cigarettes for smoking cessation: a randomised controlled trial". The Lancet. 382 (9905): 1629–1637. doi:10.1016/s0140-6736(13)61842-5. PMID 24029165. Wikidata Q34370483.
- Jull, Andrew; Cullum, Nicola Anne; Jo C Dumville; Westby, Maggie; Deshpande, Sohan; Walker, Natalie (2015). "Honey as a topical treatment for wounds". Cochrane Database of Systematic Reviews (3) CD005083. doi:10.1002/14651858.cd005083.pub4. PMID 25742878. Wikidata Q24187363.
- Barnes, Joanne; Dong, Christine Y; Hayden McRobbie; Walker, Natalie; Mehta, Monaz; Stead, Lindsay (2010). "Hypnotherapy for smoking cessation". Cochrane Database of Systematic Reviews (10) CD001008. doi:10.1002/14651858.cd001008.pub2. PMID 20927723. Wikidata Q24234471.
- Walker, Natalie; Howe, Colin; Glover, Marewa; et al. (2014). "Cytisine versus nicotine for smoking cessation". The New England Journal of Medicine. 371 (25): 2353–62. doi:10.1056/nejmoa1407764. PMID 25517706. Wikidata Q28254090.
- Walker, Natalie; Parag, Varsha; Verbiest, Marjolein; Laking, George; Laugesen, Murray Brian; Bullen, Christopher (2019). "Nicotine patches used in combination with e-cigarettes (with and without nicotine) for smoking cessation: a pragmatic, randomised trial". The Lancet. Respiratory medicine. 8 (1): 54–64. doi:10.1016/s2213-2600(19)30269-3. PMID 31515173. Wikidata Q90082784.
