= Postcibalome =

Hormonal response to food

Postcibalome is the comprehensive array of biochemical and physiological responses that occur in the body, most notably in the blood, following the consumption of food. This term encompasses the complex interplay of hormonal, nutritional, and metabolic changes that take place as the body processes food and returns to its fasting state. It includes fluctuations in hormones, nutrients, metabolites, and proteins, as well as stress responses associated with excessive food intake. The term "postcibalome" is derived from "postcibal," which combines the prefix "post-" (after) with the Latin word "cibus," meaning food.

The changes in blood composition after eating are intricate and can serve as important indicators of metabolic health. Studies have shown that alterations in glucose and insulin levels are significant markers of metabolic dysfunction, with insulin resistance often signifying a risk for diabetes. Additionally, the gene expression and proteome of white blood cells, as well as the metabolome and proteome of the blood, exhibit dynamic changes in response to food intake. These collective fluctuations highlight the body's adaptive mechanisms in managing nutrient intake and maintaining metabolic balance.

== See also ==
- Postprandial dip
