= Nicotine & Tobacco Research =

- Discipline: Addiction
- Language: English
- Edited by: Marcus Munafò

Publication details
- History: 1999-present
- Publisher: Oxford University Press on behalf of the Society for Research on Nicotine and Tobacco
- Frequency: Monthly
- Impact factor: 3.786 (2018)

Standard abbreviations
- ISO 4: Nicotine Tob. Res.

Indexing
- CODEN: NTREF6
- ISSN: 1462-2203 (print); 1469-994X (web)
- LCCN: 00244999
- OCLC no.: 710017950

Links
- Journal homepage; Online access; Online archive

Nicotine & Tobacco Research (N&TR) is a monthly peer-reviewed medical journal covering research pertaining to tobacco products and nicotine. It was established in 1999 and is the official journal of the Society for Research on Nicotine and Tobacco.

It is published by Oxford University Press. According to the Journal Citation Reports, the journal had a 2018 impact factor of 3.786, ranking it 3rd out of 19 journals in the SI category "Substance Abuse".

One editor-in-chief was Marcus Munafò (University of Bristol).

== See also ==
- Addiction medicine
- Smoking cessation
- Tobacco control
- Tobacco harm reduction
