= Marcus Munafo =

British psychologist and researcher

Marcus Robert Munafo
- Born: 23 January 1972 (age 54)
- Education: University of Oxford; University of Southampton
- Scientific career
- Fields: Biological psychology Health psychology Tobacco control
- Workplaces: University of Bath

Marcus Robert Munafò, (born 23 January 1972) is a British psychologist who has been a professor of biological psychology at the University of Bristol's School of Experimental Psychology since 2010. He became the editor-in-chief of Nicotine & Tobacco Research in 2015.

== Early life and education ==
Munafò received his M.A. with honors from the University of Oxford in 1993, his M.Sc. from the University of Southampton in health psychology in 1995, and his Ph.D. in anxiety and surgery from the University of Southampton in 1999.

== Career ==
He has been a professor of biological psychology at the University of Bristol's School of Experimental Psychology since 2010.

In 2015, he became the editor-in-chief of Nicotine & Tobacco Research.

In 2025 he became the Deputy Vice-Chancellor and Provost of the University of Bath.

== Research ==
Munafò's research has focused on, among other things, the health and psychological effects of tobacco and alcohol use. He has also researched scientific reproducibility for much of his career, starting when he was a student and failed to replicate findings he found in the literature. For example, a study he co-authored with Andrew Higginson found that incentivizing academics to produce a small number of highly cited studies also incentivized them to conduct many new, underpowered studies and fewer replication studies. This interest led him to co-found the UK Reproducibility Network (UKRN) in 2019 with colleagues including Dr Lara Fortunato, Professor Christopher Chambers, Professor Dorothy Bishop, and Professor Malcolm Macleod. In December 2021, Munafò and Bishop provided oral evidence to the Science and Technology Committee inquiry on reproducibility and research integrity.

== Recognition ==
In 2017, Munafò received the Presidents' Award for Distinguished Contributions to Psychological Knowledge, an award given annually by the British Psychological Society.
