= Obesity Reviews =

- Discipline: Obesity, nutrition science
- Language: English
- Edited by: David York

Publication details
- History: 2000-present
- Publisher: Wiley-Blackwell on behalf of the World Obesity Federation
- Frequency: Monthly
- Impact factor: 10.867 (2021)

Standard abbreviations
- ISO 4: Obes. Rev.

Indexing
- CODEN: ORBEBL
- ISSN: 1467-7881 (print); 1467-789X (web)
- LCCN: 00243319
- OCLC no.: 299336066

Links
- Journal homepage; Online access; Online archive

Obesity Reviews is a monthly peer-reviewed medical journal, established in 2000, which publishes reviews on all obesity-related disciplines. It is the official journal of the World Obesity Federation and published on their behalf by Wiley-Blackwell. The editor-in-chief is David A. York (Utah State University).

== Abstracting and indexing ==
The journal is abstracted and indexed in:

- Academic Search
- AGRICOLA
- CAB Abstracts
- CAB HEALTH
- Current Contents/Clinical Medicine
- Embase
- MEDLINE
- Science Citation Index Expanded
- Scopus

According to the Journal Citation Reports, the journal has a 2017 impact factor of 8.483. According to Web of Science, the 2024 Journal Impact Factor has been 8.0, ranking it in the first quartile of the category "Endocrinology and metabolism".
