= Marina Picciotto =

American neuroscientist

Marina Rachel Picciotto
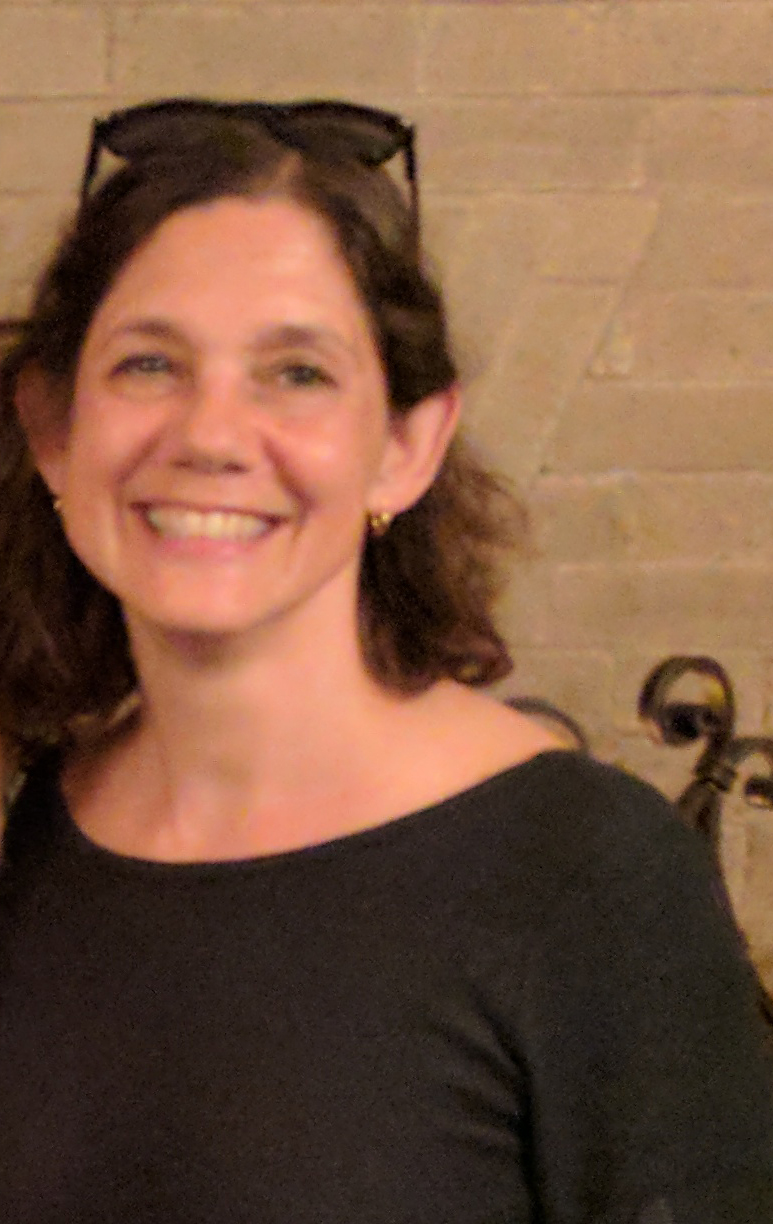
- Marina Picciotto at Yale University in 2017
- Born: June 22, 1963 (age 63); Bloomington, Indiana, U.S.
- Education: Stanford University; Rockefeller University
- Known for: Nicotinic receptors
- Awards: AAAS fellow of the American Association for the Advancement of Science (2014); National Academy of Medicine (2012); Jacob P. Waletzky Memorial Award for Innovative Research in Drug Addiction and Alcohol Research from The Society for Neuroscience (2007); Presidential Early Career Award for Scientists and Engineers (2000)
- Scientific career
- Fields: Neuroscience
- Workplaces: Yale University
- Doctoral advisor: Paul Greengard
- Other academic advisors: Jean-Pierre Changeux, Richard Scheller
- Website: psychiatry.yale.edu/people/marina_picciotto-4.profile

Marina Rachel Picciotto (born June 22, 1963) is an American neuroscientist known for her work on the role of nicotinic acetylcholine receptors in addiction, memory, and reward behaviors. She is the Charles B. G. Murphy Professor of Psychiatry and professor in the Child Study Center and the Departments of Neuroscience and of Pharmacology at the Yale University School of Medicine. She is currently president of the American Association for the Advancement of Science.

== Early life and education ==
Born in Bloomington, Indiana on June 22, 1963, Picciotto moved to New York City as an infant and graduated from Hunter College High School in 1981. Picciotto received her B.S. in biology from Stanford University in 1985,

Picciotto was an undergraduate researcher at Stanford University, where she worked with Richard Scheller. There she discovered that the FMRFamide gene gives rise to multiple copies of the neuropeptide. She went on to PhD work with Paul Greengard at Rockefeller University where she cloned the gene for calcium/calmodulin-dependent protein kinase 1 She received her Ph.D. in 1992 from Rockefeller University.

== Career ==
She carried out postdoctoral work at the Pasteur Institute in Paris from 1992-1995 as a Human Frontier Science Program postdoctoral fellow with Jean-Pierre Changeux. Picciotto produced the first mouse knock-out lacking a nicotinic receptor subunit. She returned to the United States in 1995 to join the Yale University faculty as an assistant professor and rising through the ranks to become the Charles B.G. Murphy Professor in Psychiatry in 2008. In 2016, her group was known for its discoveries in nicotine addiction and brain circuits. Recent work from Picciotto showed that pre-natal exposure to nicotine has profound effects on adult behavior.

She was named director of the Yale University Interdepartmental Neuroscience Program in September 2023. Insight gained from her laboratory's research on nicotine addiction has helped inform development of smoking cessation treatments. In a 2017 press interviews, she has expressed concerns about the use of e-cigarettes and low-dose nicotine cigarettes.

== Service ==
From 2015 to 2023, Picciotto was editor-in-chief of The Journal of Neuroscience. After taking over leadership at the journal, she instituted a number of changes including eliminating submission fees for Society for Neuroscience members and restoring the ability of authors to publish supplementary data alongside their papers. Picciotto instituted new controls on statistical analysis and experimental design reporting. In a move to support pre-print publishing, Picciotto added The Journal of Neuroscience to the list of journals that will accept submissions directly from bioRxiv. She also started initiatives on social media to thank scientists who participated in peer review at the journal. She served as president of the Society for Neuroscience from 2023-2024.

== Awards ==
President Bill Clinton presented Picciotto with the Presidential Early Career Award for Scientists and Engineers at the White House in 2000. She received the Jacob P. Waletzky Memorial Award for Innovative Research in Drug Addiction and Alcohol Research from The Society for Neuroscience in 2007. Picciotto was elected as an AAAS fellow of the American Association for the Advancement of Science in 2014, and was elected to the National Academy of Medicine in 2012. Picciotto was elected president of the Society for Research on Nicotine and Tobacco, for the 2018-19 term. In 2019, Picciotto was among 11 scientists awarded the National Institutes of Health's Pioneer Award. That same year, she was awarded the Bernice Grafstein award for advancing the careers of women in neuroscience. She received the Andrew Carnegie Prize for Mind and Brain Science in 2020 and she was awarded the Langley Award for Basic Research on Nicotine and Tobacco in 2021. Picciotto was inducted into the American Academy of Arts and Sciences in 2024 for her work in the field of neuroscience.
