= Belinda Borrelli =

American clinical psychologist

- Born: Paramus, New Jersey, US
- Spouse: Steven Riesinger (m. 2011)

Academic background
- Education: BA, Rutgers University; MA, PhD, University of Illinois at Chicago

Belinda Borrelli is an American clinical psychologist specializing in smoking cessation. She is a Full Professor in the Henry M. Goldman School of Dental Medicine's Department of Health Policy and Health Services Research and director of Boston University's Behavioral Science Research.

== Early life and education ==
Growing up in Paramus, New Jersey, Borrelli worked at Chick-fil-A in Paramus Park to receive a scholarship to Rutgers University. Following this, she received her Master's degree and PhD in clinical psychology from the University of Illinois at Chicago and completed her residency and fellowship training in Behavioral and Preventive Medicine at Brown University's Alpert Medical School.

== Career ==
=== Brown University ===
Following her residency and fellowship, Borrelli joined the faculty at Brown University in 1997. During her tenure at Brown, Borrelli led the first study focusing on Latino smokers who are caregivers to children with asthma. She also led the Parents of Asthmatics Quit Smoking project in 2002 which focused on how to motivate parents of kids with asthma to stop smoking. She served as the Co-Principal Investigator with Michelle Henshaw on a project aimed at motivating low income parents to engage in pediatric oral health behaviors, with the goal of cavity prevention. As a result of her research, Borrelli was promoted to the rank of full professor in 2009.

=== Boston University ===
Borrelli left Brown University in 2013 to become a visiting professor at the University of Manchester. Upon returning to the United States, she became the director of Boston University's the Center for Behavioral Science Research and professor in the Henry M. Goldman School of Dental Medicine's Department of Health Policy and Health Services Research in September 2014. While serving in these roles, Borrelli was the first author on a study titled Prevalence and Frequency of mHealth and eHealth Use Among US and UK Smokers and Differences by Motivation to Quit. To reach her conclusion, Borrelli and her research team evaluated a cohort of 1,000 smokers, half from the United States and half from the United Kingdom.

In May 2017, Borrelli and colleagues from across Boston University launched an Affinity Research Collaborative on Mobile and Electronic Health. The aim of Mobile and Electronic Health ARC was to conduct research and training in mobile and electronic health to improve the health of populations, through mobile technology. As a result of her collaborative research, Borrelli was the recipient of the 2017 Evans Center Research Collaborator of the Year by the Evans Center for Interdisciplinary Biomedical Research and the Boston University Department of Medicine.

During the COVID-19 pandemic, Borrelli joined BU's Institute for Health System Innovation & Policy as their Director of the Digital Health Domain. She also became an associate editor of the journal American Psychologist.

== Personal life ==
Borrelli married Steven Riesinger in 2011.
