= Postprandial somnolence =

State of drowsiness or lassitude following a meal

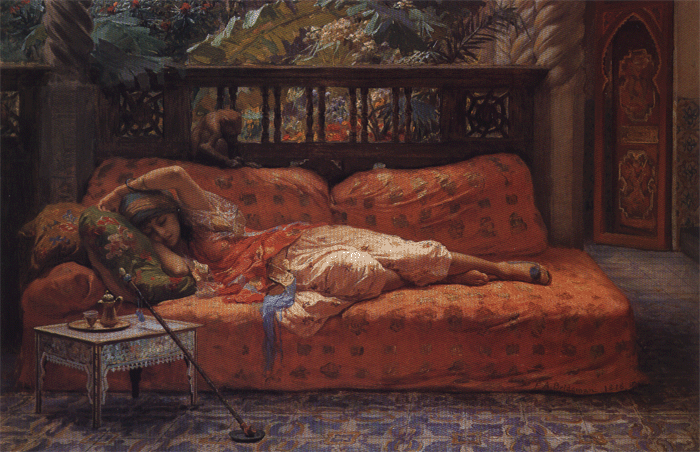
An oil painting of a young woman having a siesta, or an afternoon nap, which usually occurs after the mid-day meal

Postprandial somnolence (colloquially known as food coma or after-meal dip) is a benign state of drowsiness or lassitude following a meal, a general state of sleepiness and low energy related to activation of the parasympathetic nervous system in response to mass in the gastrointestinal tract.

While there are numerous theories surrounding this behavior, such as decreased blood flow to the brain, neurohormonal modulation of sleep through digestive coupled signaling, or vagal stimulation, very few have been explicitly tested. To date, human studies have loosely examined the behavioral characteristics of postprandial sleep, demonstrating potential shifts in EEG spectra and self-reported sleepiness. To date, the only clear animal models for examining the genetic and neuronal basis for this behavior are the fruit fly, the mouse, and the nematode Caenorhabditis elegans.

== Physiology ==
The exact cause of postprandial somnolence is unknown, but there are some scientific hypotheses:

=== Adenosine and orexin hypothesis ===
Increases in glucose concentration excite and induce vasodilation in ventrolateral preoptic nucleus neurons of the hypothalamus via astrocytic release of adenosine that is blocked by A_{2A} receptor antagonists like caffeine. Evidence also suggests that the small rise in blood glucose that occurs after a meal is sensed by glucose-inhibited neurons in the lateral hypothalamus. These orexin-expressing neurons appear to be hyperpolarised (inhibited) by a glucose-activated potassium channel. This inhibition is hypothesized to then reduce output from orexigenic neurons to aminergic, cholinergic, and glutamatergic arousal pathways of the brain, thus decreasing the activity of those pathways.

=== Parasympathetic activation ===
In response to the arrival of food in the stomach and small intestine, the activity of the parasympathetic nervous system increases and the activity of the sympathetic nervous system decreases. This shift in the balance of autonomic tone towards the parasympathetic system results in a subjective state of low energy and a desire to be at rest, the opposite of the fight-or-flight state induced by high sympathetic tone. The larger the meal, the greater the shift in autonomic tone towards the parasympathetic system, regardless of the composition of the meal.

=== Insulin, large neutral amino acids, and tryptophan ===
When foods with a high glycemic index are consumed, the carbohydrates in the food are more easily digested than low glycemic index foods. Hence, more glucose is available for absorption. It should not be misunderstood that glucose is absorbed more rapidly because, once formed, glucose is absorbed at the same rate. It is only available in higher amounts due to the ease of digestion of high glycemic index foods. In individuals with normal carbohydrate metabolism, insulin levels rise concordantly to drive glucose into the body's tissues and maintain blood glucose levels in the normal range. Insulin stimulates the uptake of valine, leucine, and isoleucine into skeletal muscle, but not uptake of tryptophan. This lowers the ratio of these branched-chain amino acids in the bloodstream relative to tryptophan (an aromatic amino acid), making tryptophan preferentially available to the large neutral amino acid transporter at the blood–brain barrier. Uptake of tryptophan by the brain thus increases. In the brain, tryptophan is converted to serotonin, which is then converted to melatonin. Increased brain serotonin and melatonin levels result in sleepiness.

=== Insulin-induced hypokalemia ===
Insulin can also cause postprandial somnolence via another mechanism. Insulin increases the activity of Na/K ATPase, causing increased movement of potassium into cells from the extracellular fluid. The large movement of potassium from the extracellular fluid can lead to a mild hypokalemic state. The effects of hypokalemia can include fatigue, muscle weakness, or paralysis. The severity of the hypokalemic state can be evaluated using Fuller's Criteria. Stage 1 is characterized by no symptoms but mild hypokalemia. Stage 2 is characterized with symptoms and mild hypokalemia. Stage 3 is characterized by only moderate to severe hypokalemia.

=== Cytokines ===
Cytokines are somnogenic and are likely key mediators of sleep responses to infection and food. Some pro-inflammatory cytokines correlate with daytime sleepiness.

== Myths about the causes of postprandial somnolence ==
=== Cerebral blood flow and oxygen delivery ===
Although the passage of food into the gastrointestinal tract results in increased blood flow to the stomach and intestines, this is achieved by diversion of blood primarily from skeletal muscle tissue and by increasing the volume of blood pumped forward by the heart each minute. The flow of oxygen and blood to the brain is extremely tightly regulated by the circulatory system and does not drop after a meal.

=== Turkey and tryptophan ===
A common myth holds that turkey is especially high in tryptophan, resulting in sleepiness after it is consumed, as may occur at the traditional meal of the North American holiday of Thanksgiving. However, the tryptophan content of turkey is comparable to chicken, beef, and other meats, and does not result in higher blood tryptophan levels than other common foods. Certain foods, such as soybeans, sesame and sunflower seeds, and certain cheeses, are also high in tryptophan. Whether it is possible or not that these may induce sleepiness if consumed in sufficient quantities has yet to be studied.

== Counteraction ==
A 2015 study, reported in the journal Ergonomics, showed that, for twenty healthy subjects, exposure to blue-enriched light during the post-lunch dip period significantly reduced the EEG alpha activity, and increased task performance.

== History ==
The term "food drunk" has sometimes been used to describe the supposed state of a person after overeating. In October 1905, Thomas Edison (then 58 years old) declared that "the country is food drunk.... the people eat too much and sleep too much, and don't work enough". The phrase was echoed by Dr J E Rullfson of Toledo after fasting for sixty days from January 5, 1907. He held that the entire human race is food drunk, saying "the dinner eaten by Napoleon just before the Battle of Leipzig proved so indigestible that the monarch's brain was clouded and as a result the battle was lost and a pie which King Philip failed to digest caused the revolt of the Netherlands."

== See also ==
- Alkaline tide
- Glycemic index, a measure of how fast blood sugar levels rise
- Postprandial dip
- Sugar high
