= Oxyhyperglycemia =

Oxyhyperglycemia is a special type of impaired glucose tolerance characterized by a rapid and transient hyperglycemia (i.e. rise in blood glucose) spike after an oral intake of glucose, the peak of this spike being high enough to cause transient, symptom free glycosuria (i.e. detectable glucose in urine), but this hyperglycemia reverses rapidly and may even go to hypoglycemia in the later phase. This sharp downstroke overshooting towards hypoglycemia distinguishes this pathologic phenomenon from the artificial hyperglycemia inducible by an intravenous bolus dose of a large amount of glucose solution. Early dumping syndrome patients usually have oxyhyperglycemia associated with any meal or OGTT.

The Greek root oxy means "sharp" or "pointy". The OGTT curve in this condition appears sharp and somewhat pointy (at least relative to the other forms of hyperglycemia)- hence this name.Dorlands dictionary defines oxyhyperglycemia as:

"A condition in which there is slight glycosuria and an Oral Glucose Tolerance curve that rises about 180–200 mg/dL but returns to fasting value 2.5 hrs after ingestion of the glucose."

A blood level of approximately 180 mg/dL is the renal glucose threshold below which all glucose is reabsorbed from glomerular filtrate. But at blood concentrations above the renal threshold sugar starts appearing in the urine.Oxyhyperglycemia, like other forms of Impaired glucose tolerance has also been suggested to be a prediabetic condition

== Cause ==
Oxyhyperglycemia is most commonly caused by early dumping syndrome, but it can rarely be caused by other conditions like Graves' disease. It was first described by Lawrence et al. in 1936 as often happening after gastroenterostomy. It is seen in most forms of gastrectomy, gastric bypass and gastrostomy procedures, all of which are surgical causes of dumping syndrome.

== Mechanism ==
In early dumping syndrome, pancreatic glucagon is augmented in the early postprandial period, probably through stimulation the catecholamines involved in the generalized autonomic surge induced by the osmotic load, but at 120 min, when most of the hypoglycemias are encountered, pancreatic glucagon is no longer detectable, likely through inhibition by GLP-1. Incretins including GLP1 and GIP also bring in the late dumping effects including the insulin rise and the reactive hypoglycemia.

== Diagnosis ==
=== Distinction from regular impaired glucose tolerance ===
Most patients (or animals) with prediabetic type impaired glucose tolerance (serum glucose 140–200 mg/dL at 2 hours after OGTT) are generally not oxyhyperglycemic because:

1. Glycosuria is not necessary for mild impaired glucose tolerance (e.g. at approx 140–180 mg/dL range of blood glucose), is necessary for oxyhyperglycemia (i.e. peak >renal threshold).
2. In contrast to the commonly seen shallow OGTT curve, amplitude of the pointy spike in oxyhyperglycemia need not necessarily be restricted to only prediabetic range and in severe oxyhyperglycemia it may cross 250 mg/dL. In oxyhyperglycemia, by two hours, the glucose not only comes back to pre-diabetic range it may even start shooting below the fasting baseline.
3. In oxyhyperglycemia, both the upstroke (by 30 minutes) and down stroke (by 2.5 hr) happens quite fast which is unusual for other forms of prediabetes. In most cases of impaired tolerance, glucose levels usually do not come down as quickly, rather lasts for 2 hours or more. Whereas if the oxyhyperglycemia is due to an early dumping syndrome it may be followed by a late dumping syndrome which may even have a hypoglycemic state. For animal studies, occasionally oxyhyperglycemia is written as synonymous for impaired glucose tolerance but mostly in the right context of gastrectomy, thus actually implying its narrower meaning than impaired glucose tolerance.
