= The Journal of Clinical Psychiatry =

- Discipline: Psychiatry
- Language: English
- Edited by: Marlene P. Freeman

Publication details
- Former name: Diseases of the Nervous System
- History: 1940–present
- Publisher: Physicians Postgraduate Press (United States)
- Frequency: Bi-Monthly
- Impact factor: 5.906 (2021)

Standard abbreviations
- ISO 4: J. Clin. Psychiatry

Indexing
- CODEN: JCLPDE
- ISSN: 0160-6689 (print); 1555-2101 (web)
- LCCN: 78642401
- OCLC no.: 03661773

Links
- Journal homepage

The Journal of Clinical Psychiatry is a peer-reviewed medical journal that covers clinical psychiatry, especially depression, bipolar disorder, schizophrenia, anxiety, addiction, and attention-deficit/hyperactivity disorder, as well as several other mental disorders. It is the official journal of the American Society for Clinical Psychopharmacology and was established in 1940 as Diseases of the Nervous System, before obtaining its current name in 1979.

Most subscribers receive the journal free of charge if they are designated as psychiatric clinicians in provider databases such as the American Medical Association's masterfile.

The journal occasionally publishes sponsored supplements. Although these supplements may be perceived as more biased by commercial interests, and are subjected to a different peer review process than articles in the journal proper, they nevertheless have a comparable number of citations.

== Abstracting and indexing ==
The journal is abstracted and indexed in:

- MEDLINE/PubMed
- EMBASE/Excerpta Medica
- Psychological Abstracts
- Current Contents/Social & Behavioral Sciences
- Current Contents/Clinical Medicine
- Science Citation Index
- Biological Abstracts
- CINAHL
- PsycINFO
- Chemical Abstracts
- Social Sciences Citation Index

According to the Journal Citation Reports, the journal has a 2021 impact factor of 5.906.

== See also ==
- List of psychiatry journals
