= Janet Hoek =

New Zealand academic

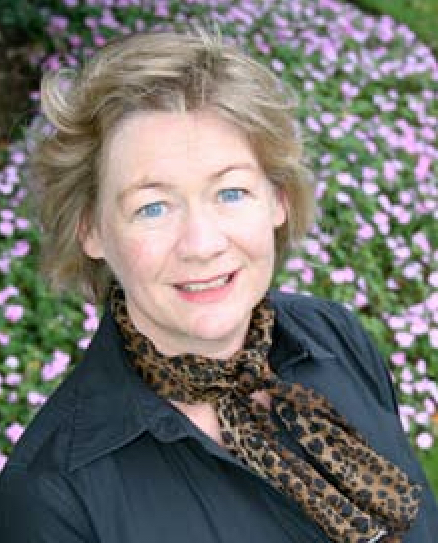
- Hoek in 2007
- Education: Massey University
- Scientific career
- Fields: Public Health
- Workplaces: University of Otago
- Thesis: Some effects of question wording and question administration on the prediction of voting behaviour (1996)
- Doctoral students: Rachael McLean

Janet Anne Hoek is a New Zealand academic. She was promoted to full professor at Massey University in 2003 and was appointed full professor at the University of Otago.

== Academic career ==
After a 1996 PhD titled 'Some effects of question wording and question administration on the prediction of voting behaviour' at the Massey University, Hoek moved to the University of Otago, rising to full professor.

Hoek's research has focused on public-interest issues such as smoke-free policy, and is co-director of Aspire 2025, University of Otago Research Centre whose work aims to support the New Zealand Government's goal of becoming a smoke-free nation by 2025.

During Michaelmas term of 2019 Hoek was a Fellow of the Durham University Institute of Advanced Study, where she was affiliated to Stephenson College.

== Other service ==
In 2020 Hoek was elected a Fellow of the Society for Research on Nicotine and Tobacco.
