= World Obesity Day =

Health awareness day

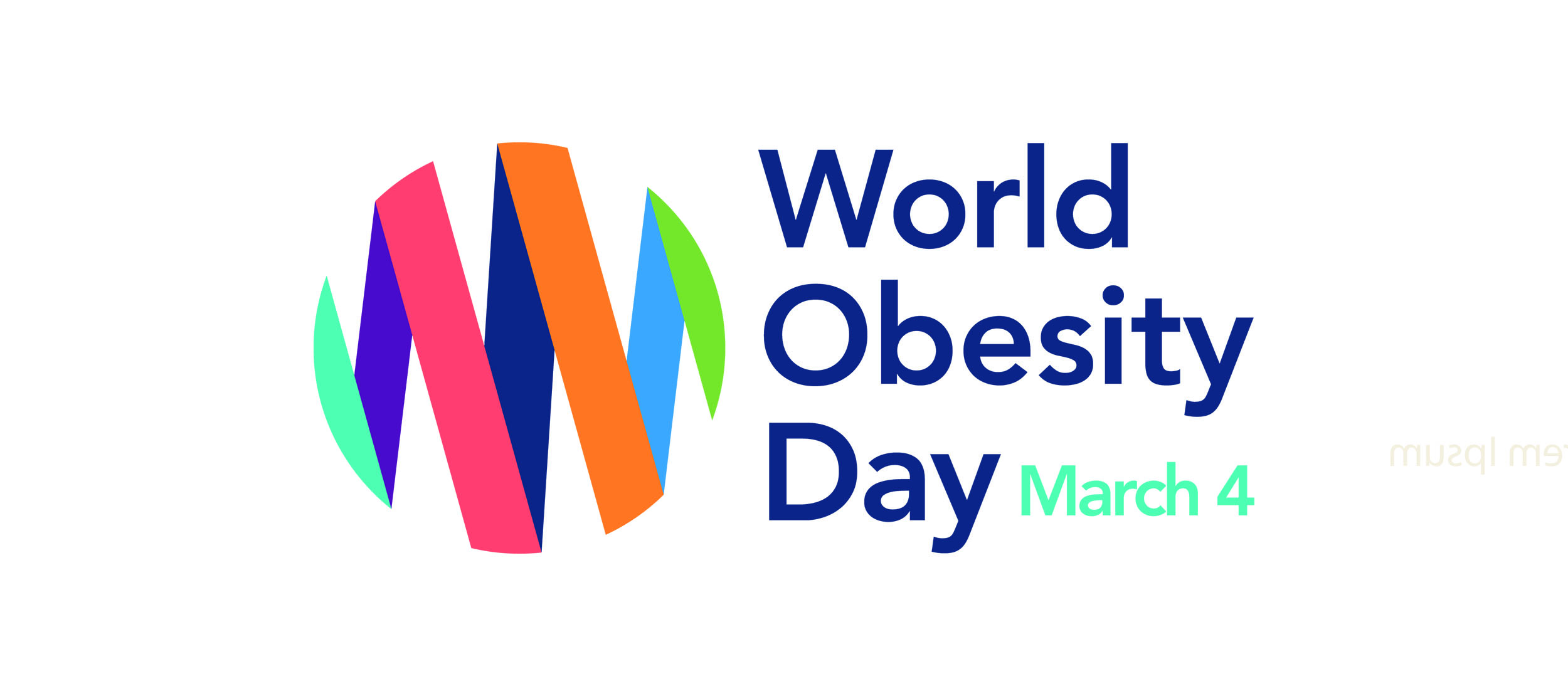
World Obesity Day Logo March 4

World Obesity Day, an internationally recognized event, moved to March 4 in 2020 from its previous date on October 11. It serves as an annual platform to raise awareness and advocate for practical solutions in addressing the global obesity crisis.

It is organized by the World Obesity Federation, a non-profit body which is in official relations with the World Health Organization (WHO) and is a collaborating body on the Lancet Commission on Obesity. World Obesity states that its aim is to "lead and drive global efforts to reduce, prevent and treat obesity."

The first World Obesity Day took place in 2015. The second took place in 2016 and focused on childhood obesity, aligning with the WHO Commission report on Ending Childhood Obesity.

World Obesity Day 2017 was themed "treat obesity now and avoid the consequences later." It called for investment in treatment services to support people affected by obesity, early intervention to improve the success of treatment, and prevention to reduce the need for treatment.

On World Obesity Day 2023, WHO presented five key trends related to overweight and obesity in primary school-aged children in the European Region. These trends are based on data collected from the fifth round of the WHO European Childhood Obesity Surveillance Initiative (COSI), conducted from 2018 to 2020, with participation from 33 countries and measurements taken from nearly 411,000 children.

World Obesity Day 2024 adopted the theme "Let's Talk About Obesity and…", emphasizing the importance of initiating broader conversations that connect obesity with youth, environmental, social, and community factors. The campaign aimed to spark conversations connecting obesity with health, youth and the wider world, especially among children and adolescents.

On 4 March 2025, the campaign's theme was "Changing Systems, Healthier Lives", shifting attention from individual behavior to structural and environmental determinants of obesity. The World Obesity Federation framed obesity as a chronic, complex disease driven by failing systems—such as healthcare, food environments, governance, media, and workplaces—and called for systemic reforms and inclusive policymaking.

On World Obesity Day 2026, the theme presented was "8 Billion Reasons to Act on Obesity", stating that "By 2035, half of the world’s population - around 4 billion people - are expected to be living with overweight or obesity.", it focused on childhood obesity as a rising issue in low to middle-income countries, the correlation of obesity to economic and social inequality, poverty, and stigma.
