= BPG =

BPG may refer to:

- Baishideng Publishing Group, an American publishing company
- Berkeley Patients Group, a Californian cannabis medical dispensary
- Better Portable Graphics, a file format for coding digital images
- Big Spring McMahon–Wrinkle Airport (FAA location identifier), near Big Spring, Texas
- Bisphosphoglycerate, a molecule with two biologically important isomers:
  - 1,3-Bisphosphoglyceric acid, a metabolite in glycolysis
  - 2,3-Bisphosphoglyceric acid, regulates hemoglobin
- Bourne Publishing Group, a British publishing company
- The Brighton Pier Group, British leisure and hospitality company
- Broadcasting Press Guild, a British association of journalists
