= Béla Merkely =

Hungarian cardiologist (born 1966)

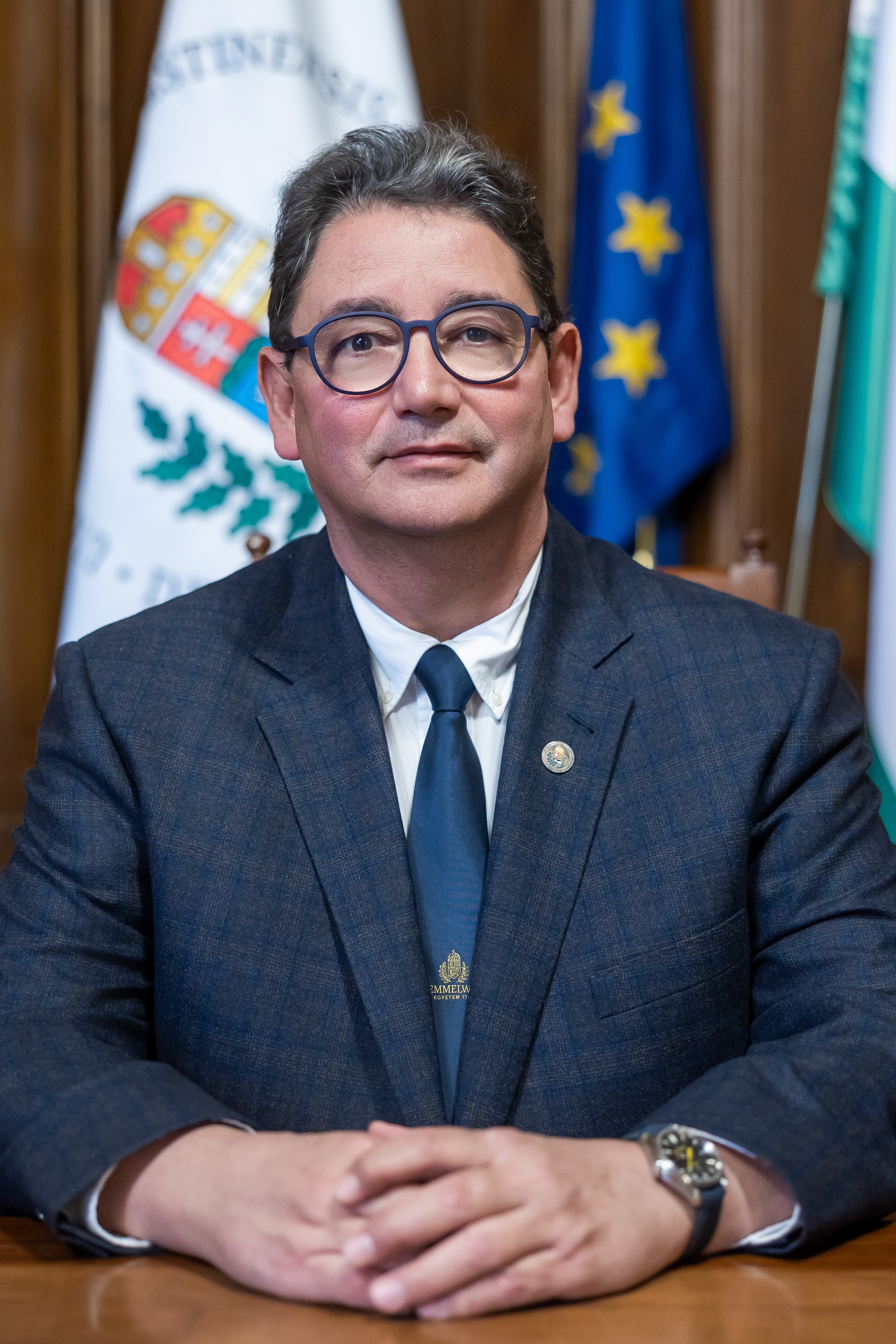

Rector of Semmelweis University
- Preceded by: Ágoston Szél
- Incumbent
- Assumed office 2018

Personal details
- Born: 28 June 1966 (age 60) Budapest, Hungary
- Children: 3
- Profession: Medical doctor, cardiologist, sports physician, university professor, interventional cardiologist

Dr. Béla Merkely (born 28 June 1966) is a Hungarian interventional cardiologist and sports cardiologist, a university professor, director of Semmelweis University's Heart and Vascular Centre and the current rector of Semmelweis University since 1 July 2018.

== Career ==
Béla Merkely obtained his medical degree with summa cum laude honours in 1991 at Semmelweis University's Faculty of Medicine in Budapest, Hungary. After graduation, he continued his studies at the third Department of Internal Medicine at Ruprecht-Karls University of Heidelberg, Germany as a DAAD Fellow.

He became board certified in cardiology in 1998 and obtained his PhD in ventricular arrhythmias in 1999. He also holds a Transthoracic Echocardiography (TTE) Certification and was the first Hungarian clinical cardiac electrophysiologist to earn the Cardiac Pacing and Implantable Cardioverter Defibrillators Certification issued by the European Heart Rhythm Association (EHRA). In 2006, he became a Doctor of the Hungarian Academy of Sciences (DSc).

Since 2007, he has been chairman and director of Semmelweis University's Heart and Vascular Centre. The following year, he was promoted to professor at Semmelweis University. Merkely served as president of Semmelweis University's Clinical Centre and vice-rector for clinical affairs from 2015 to 2018. In 2018, he was appointed rector of Semmelweis University. Since 2026 he is director of Semmelweis University's Anatomy & Innovation Center for Education and Research (AICER), a multidisciplinary research center that hosts cutting-edge surgical education, biomechanical research, and medical technology validation.

Merkely is the honorary president of the Hungarian Society of Cardiology, honorary president and former president of the Hungarian Heart Rhythm Association, former president of the Hungarian Association of Percutaneous Cardiovascular Intervention, and president of the Cardiology Section of the Professional College. He has been co-president of the Hungarian Rectors' Conference since 2021 and the president since 2025. Merkely has been fellow of the European Society of Cardiology (ESC) since 2001, and has held functions (councillor, vice president) in the different bodies and associations of the European Society of Cardiology (ESC) for more than 20 years. He has been fellow of the American College of Cardiology (ACC) since 2011 and member of the Academia Europaea since 2022.

From 2020, following the outbreak of the COVID-19 pandemic, Merkely was the chair of the Clinical Epidemiology Working Group of the four hungarian medical Universities and also the chair of the Epidemiology Committee of Semmelweis University.

== Research and scientific work ==
His major research interests are the non-pharmacological treatment of heart failure; new techniques in interventional cardiology; invasive and non-invasive imaging in heart failure; arrhythmias and acute coronary syndromes; sports cardiology, cardiac remodelling of elite athletes. His research activities include numerous projects funded by national and international grants. His papers are published in a range of Hungarian and international scientific journals. He is the editor-in-chief of the Hungarian journal Orvosképzés (a Hungarian journal of Medical Education), vice editor-in-chief of Interventional Medicine & Applied Science and is the member of the editorial boards of Cor et Vasa, the Journal of Cardiovascular Emergencies, Journal of Hungarian Interdisciplinary Medicine, Frontiers in Cardiovascular Medicine, Advances in Interventional Cardiology, World Journal of Cardiology and Clinical Research in Cardiology., and Cardiovascular Medicine.

He has authored and co-authored five edited books, three specialized books, 74 book chapters (eight in English, 33 in Hungarian, 33 university coursebook chapters), three university textbooks. His cumulative impact factor is over 8,400, the number of his independent citations is nearly 101,000. (As of October 2025.)

He is a regular speaker at Hungarian and international scientific conferences, such as the World Congress of Cardiology, EUROPACE-Cardiostim, EUROPCR and others organised by the American Heart Association, the World Heart Federation, and the American College of Cardiology.

== Scientific degrees ==
- 2011 Fellow of the American College of Cardiology (FACC)
- 2006 Doctor of the Hungarian Academy of Sciences (DSc) ”Pathomechanisms of tachyarrhythmias and new electrophysiological non-pharmacological treatment strategies”
- 2006 Med. Habil Semmelweis University (Cardiology)
- 2001 Fellow of the European Society of Cardiology (FESC)
- 1999 Ph.D. ”Experimental and clinical investigations of ventricular arrhythmias.”

== Honorary doctorates ==
- 2025: Honorary Doctor of Charles University, Prague
- 2024: Doctor Honoris Causa of the Iuliu Hațieganu University of Medicine and Pharmacy in Cluj-Napoca, Romania
- 2022 Honorary Doctor of the Grigore T. Popa University of Medicine and Pharmacy in Iasi
- 2022 Honorary Doctor of the University of Trnava
- 2021: Honorary Doctor of the University of Veterinary Medicine, Budapest

== Awards ==
- 2025 President's Awards - European Society of Cardiology
- 2023 Gold medal of the Cardiology Society of Serbia
- 2021 Széchenyi Prize, for the outstanding contribution to the academic life in Hungary
- 2021 Man of the Year 2020, award of the “Figyelő” business weekly
- 2017 Honorary President of the Hungarian Society of Cardiology
- 2016 Order of Merit of the Hungarian Republic, Commander Cross
- 2015 Dénes Gábor Award (in Hungarian)
- 2014 Gold Medal of Hungarian Society of Cardiology
- 2013 Honorary Citizen of Budapest
- 2012 Elite Reviewer in Europace
- 2011 “FIFA Medical Centre of Excellence” title to the Heart and Vascular Center of Semmelweis University
- 2011 Order of Merit of the Hungarian Republic, Officer's Cross
- 2009 Nivou Prize of the Hungarian Academy of Sciences
- 1999 International Virchow Award for the first place at the 10th World Congress of Electrophysiology
