= Szebeni =

Szebeni is a Hungarian surname. Notable people with the surname include:

- Janos Szebeni, Hungarian medical researcher, immunologist and author
- Nicolas Melchior Szebeni, Hungarian chaplain and astrologer who may have used the pen name Melchior Cibinensis
