= Árpád Lengyel =

Árpád Lengyel may refer to:

- Árpád Lengyel (swimmer)
- Árpád Lengyel (physician)
