= Judith Forrai =

Hungarian historian of science (born 1949)

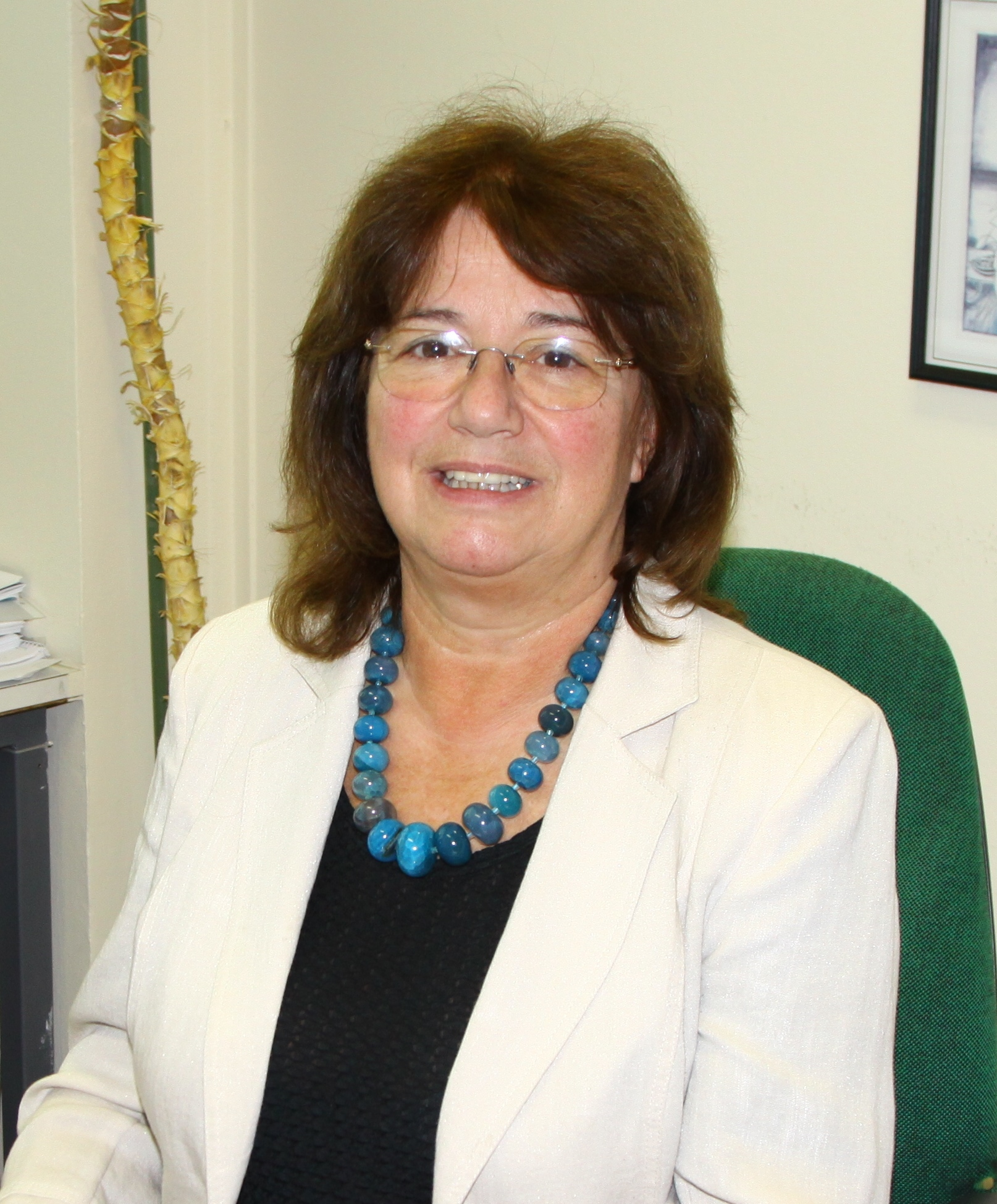
Dr. Judith Forrai

Judith Forrai (born 27 January 1949) is a Hungarian historian of science, medical historian, dentist, professor, doctor of the Hungarian Academy of Sciences, and editor-in-chief of Kaleidoscope, a cultural, scientific and medical history journal.

== Biography ==
Judith (sometimes spelled "Judit") Forrai was born in Budapest on 27 January 1949. She is the creator of modern sexual education in her country via the school curriculum and as a textbook developer. Her research area is history of science and medicine, sexology, prostitution, STD story and sexual education. She is known for dissemination of health education for the disadvantaged, prevention activities, as well as social work being integrated into nationwide training for doctors, teachers, nurses and nurses. Forrai was affiliated with Semmelweis University, Institute of History of Medicine and Social Medicine, in Budapest. She published "Prostitution at the Turn of the Century in Budapest", and "Dental Practice in Hungary at the End of the Eighteenth Century".

== Honors and awards ==
- 2016 Silver degree of Pro Universitate
- 2013 Program for Hungarian Society 2010–2020. Professional Award, in the name of priority social responsibility
- 2012 Prize from Pro Universitate Semmelweis University
- 2010 István Weszprémi Hungarian Society of Medical History, Medical History Award
- 2006 János Zsámboky. Hungarian Medical History Society, Medical History Award

== Selected works ==
- M. Diegmann, J. Forrai, K. Hoffmann, V. Sebhelyi, K. Fehér at al: Iris Project- Aufsuchende Sozialarbeit für Ungarische Strassenprostituierte in Ungarischen Stadten und in Zürich methodenhandbuch. 2012. szerk. J. Forrai. Sex Education
- M. Diegmann, J. Forrai, K. Hoffmann, V. Sebhelyi, K. Fehér at al: Iris Project- Aufsuchende Sozialarbeit für Ungarische Strassenprostituierte in Ungarischen Stadten und in Zürich Status Quo und Handlungsbedarf. 2012. szerk. J. Forrai. Sex Education
- Barabás K. Forrai J.:A szexualitás és szülés orvosi antropológiája. In: Orvosi antropológia, szerk: Lázár I. Pikó B. Medicina. Budapest, 2012.429-441.
- Medicament or poison? History of the different therapeutics of venereal diseases. In: Syphilis - Recognition, Description and Diagnosis. InTech Open Access Publisher.ed. Edited by: N. S. Sato, 2011. 37–58.
- Forrai J., Magyar L. A: Az orvosi meteorológia (klimatológia) története. In: Az éghajlatváltozás hatásai az emberi szervezetre. Törő Klára (szerk.) Budapest, Medicina. 2010.113-141.
- Forrai J, Csépe P: HUNGARY : Sex work policies. In: Sex work migration health / Eds.: M. C. Boidi, F. A. El-Nagashi, B. Karner. Amsterdam, TAMPEP International Foundation, 2009.
- Central European Medical Doctors at the turn of the Century 1890–1910. I. Database for Hungary. Gondos and Sosana Publish House. Haifa, Israel. 2007. p. 280.
- Csépe P, Forrai J, Solymossy J., Lökkös A: Egészségügyi programok három dunántúli megye roma közösségeiben in: Egyenlőség, egészség és a roma/cigány közösség. Fundación Secretariado Gitano, Madrid. 2007.
- The role of training and education in the prevention of trafficking. In: Handbook on trafficking in human beings I-IV. (szerk.: Dr. Lenke Fehér) IOM. Budapest, 2004.
- Bukovinszky J, Forrai J, Hollósi L, Kimle M, Légrádi J, Lékó E, Mikecz T, Scheinder I, Tímár I: A szexualitás egészségkönyve. Budapest, 2003. Kossuth Kiadó.
- Dental Practice in Hungary at the End of the Eighteenth Century in: Ch. Hillam (ed) Dental Practice in Hungary at the End of the 18th Century. Clio Medica 72/ISSN 0045-7183. Rodopi B.V. Amsterdam-New York, NY 2003.
- Memoirs of the beginnings of conductive pedagogy and András Pető Budapest.1999. Új Aranyhíd és Foundation of Conductive Education Birmingham 163 pp
- The onset of prostitution regulations of Budapest at the time of the unification. In: Birth of a metropolis. Pest, Buda, Óbuda at the time of the unification: exhibition in the Budapest History Museum to commemorate 125th anniversary of the capital's unification. Bp.: BTM, p. 76-83. Monograph of the history of Budapest.36. 1998.
- Civilization, sexuality and social life in historical context, the hidden face of urban life. ed. J. Forrai. Budapest, 1996. Új-Aranyhíd Kft.
- Chrestomathy on the History of Medicine. Szerk. Dr. Forrai J. Dr. Ballér P.. Budapest, 1992. SOTE házinyomda
- A prostitúció, mint társadalmi konfliktus. In: Rendi társadalom, polgári társadalom III. kötet. Társadalmi konfliktusok. (szerk.: Á. Varga László). Salgótarján. 1991. 319–325.

== Exhibitions ==
- A város rejtett arca. Prostitúció története. Szaktanácsadó Féner Tamás. 1995. Budapest. Semmelweis Egyetem.
- Szexuális nevelés HIV/AIDS megelőzés iskolai programja 1996. Vándorkiállítás. NEVI.
- A Fogászat története. Kiállítás a Fogorvosi Kar megalakulásának 50. évfordulójára. 2005. Budapest. Semmelweis Egyetem
- Milestones of the history in dentistry” from the beginnings till the 20th century. 7th ISHM. Budapest, MTA. 2006. aug. 26–30.
