= Iknife =

Medical device

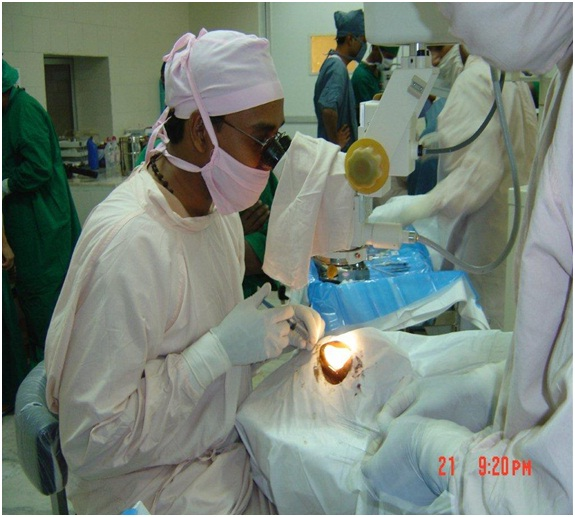
The iknife shortens the duration of a cancer surgery by eliminating long waits for results from the histological pathologist who now determines the boundary between cancerous and healthy tissue

An onkoknife, iKnife, or intelligent scalpel is a surgical knife that tests tissue as it contacts it during an operation and immediately gives information as to whether that tissue contains cancer cells. During a surgery this information is given continuously to the surgeon, significantly accelerating biological tissue analysis and enabling identification and removal of cancer cells. Electroknives have been in use since the 1920s and smart knife surgery is not limited only to cancer detection. In clinical studies the iKnife has shown impressive diagnostic accuracy - distinguishing benign ovarian tissue from cancerous tissue (97.4% sensitivity, 100% specificity), breast tumour from normal breast tissue (90.9% sensitivity, 98.8% specificity) and recognises histological features of poor prognostic outcome in colorectal carcinoma. Furthermore, the technology behind iKnife - rapid evaporative ionisation mass spectrometry (REIMS) - can identify Candida yeasts down to species level.

== Research and development ==
Zoltán Takáts, Ph.D., a Hungarian research chemist associated with Semmelweis University, in Budapest, invented the intelligent surgical knife. He currently is Professor of Analytical Chemistry at Imperial College London (UK). His iKnife has been tested in three hospitals from 2010 through 2012. Following laboratory analysis of tissue samples in 302 patients that were included in a data base, they included 1624 of cancer and 1309 of non-cancer samples.

The current pilot version for the iKnife cost the creating Hungarian scientist, MediMass Ltd. (Old Buda based company) participating in the research, colleagues at Imperial College, and the Hungarian government approximately £200 thousand (68 million HUF). According to Takáts, the investments will have been worth it, however, as the device is on a likely path to marketing.

The instrument has been acquired by the Massachusetts Waters Corporation for development by MediMass Ltd., which identifies it as substantive innovative technology labelled, "Intelligent late" and "REIMS", according to their press release on 23 July 2014. The business transaction included all MediMass innovation, including patents, software, databases, and human resources related to the technology.

== Principle of operation ==
=== History of direct examination of biological tissue by mass spectrometry (MS) ===
Direct examination of biological tissue by mass spectrometry (MS) began in the 1970s, but at that time the next advance in technical conditions did not exist. The method did not provide any useful information on the chemical composition of the samples tested. The first breakthrough came with desorption ionisation methods (secondary ionization mass spectrometry - SIMS, matrix-assisted laser desorption ionization - MALDI) a release said. Using these methods, after appropriate sample preparation, chemical biological tissue imaging analysis may be achieved. From the end of the 1990s, it became apparent that mass spectrometry data in imaging studies showed a high degree of tissue specificity, that tissue histology could determine mass spectral information, and vice versa.

In the case of the detected protein and peptide components, tissue-specific expression of the proteins is known commonly. Precise immunohistochemical methods are based on this phenomenon. The mass spectrometer detection, mainly from cell membranes and similar tissue, specifically, of complex lipids from similar tissue, however, yields surprising results. Since the distribution of proteins are in good agreement with the distribution patterns obtained by immunohistochemical methods, the distribution of the lipid components of the direct ionization mass spectrometric, previously were relative methods leading to the appearance of a new era in the study of biological specimens. The desorption electrospray ionization (DESI) was the first-MS technique, which allowed non-invasive testing of any objects (or organisms) without sample preparation, regardless of their shape or mechanical properties.

=== Rapid evaporative ionization mass spectrometry ===
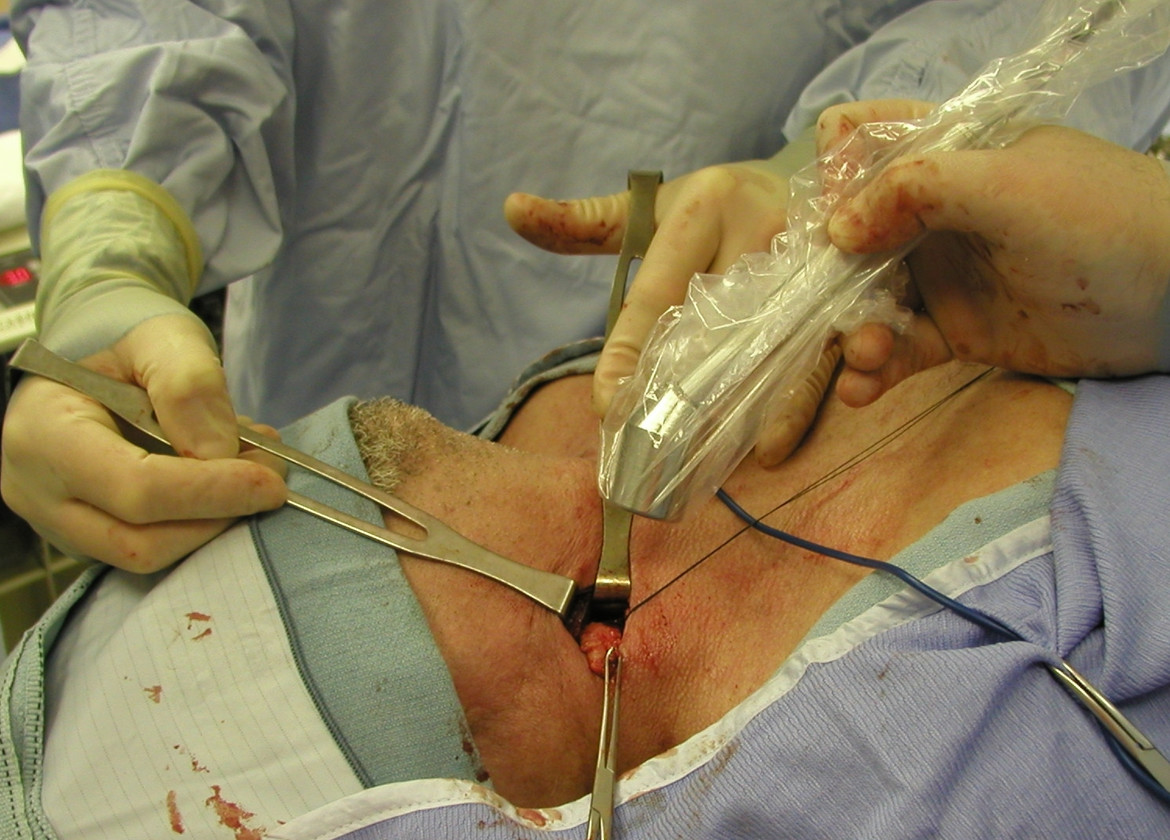
Lymph node excision

During the summer of 2009, rapid evaporative ionization mass spectrometry (REIMS) was described. This is the second generation method. Primarily, lipid components of tissues provide the information, but different metabolite molecules and certain proteins also allow detection. The most important advantage of the specificity of mass spectrometry data is at the histological level, providing the opportunity to identify biological tissue based on chemical composition. The REIMS method is unique, in that, while the above-described mass spectrometry techniques specific to the particular method developed ion sources should be used, but it is difficult in the case of ion source devices used in surgical practice. With the operation of a variety of tissue-cutting tools, such as a diathermy knife, a surgical laser, or an ultrasonic tissue atomizer, an aerosol is formed having a composition characteristic of the tissue cut, which also contains ionized cell constructs.

Among them, in terms of using the REIMS method, the intact membrane-forming phospholipids are important, which easily are detectable by mass spectrometry on the one hand, and on the other hand, contain the combination of the characteristics of the particular tissue type. Mass spectrometric analysis is just one implementation of an effective extraction system development that was needed to cut the surgical site at the time of running the generated aerosol mass spectrometer. For this purpose, a so-called Venturi-tube serves, as well as the above-mentioned surgical hand pieces, being modified to smoke the aerosols through them. Analysis of the flue gas in the mass spectrometer is realized instantaneously, within a few tenths of a second, resulting in a tissue-specific phospholipid mass spectra being obtained, allowing a response by the surgeon in less than two seconds. The analysis of the collected spectra is made of special-evaluation software, which was developed for this purpose. The software continuously compares the incoming data during surgery, validates mass spectra stored in a database, assigns the appropriate class, and the result is displayed visually to the surgeon. It also may provide information to the surgeon via an audio signal. It is estimated that the tissue identification accuracy during operation is higher than 92%.

Therefore, the method is suitable for use in a surgical environment for carrying out measurements, as well as for being a part of a complex tissue identification system used during surgical tumor removal, and it can assist the surgeon in the operating surgical site with accurate histological mapping. The rapid evaporative ionization mass spectrometry (REIMS) is a novel technique that allows electrosurgery cuts with near real-time characterization of human tissue in vivo analysis through analysis of the vapors released during the process of tissue and aerosols. The REIMS technology and electro-surgical procedure adds tissue diagnosis to the intelligent knife iKnife operating principle.

== See also ==
- Instruments used in general surgery
