= Semmelweis University =

Hungarian medical school

Coordinates: 47°29′14″N 19°04′02″E

- Semmelweis University Coat Of Arms
- Motto: Servamus Vitam Atque Servimus
- Motto in English: Protecting And Serving Life
- Type: Public
- Established: 1769; 257 years ago
- Affiliations: NCFMEA, EUA, WHO
- Rector: Béla Merkely
- Students: about 14,000 (in 2023/2024)
- Location: Budapest, Hungary
- Campus: Urban
- Website: semmelweis.hu

Semmelweis University (Hungarian: Semmelweis Egyetem, Hungarian pronunciation: [ˈsɛmːɛlvɛjs ˈɛɟɛtɛm]) is a research-led medical school in Budapest, Hungary, founded in 1769. With six faculties and a doctoral school it covers many aspects of medical and health sciences.

The university is also the largest healthcare provider in Hungary.

== History ==
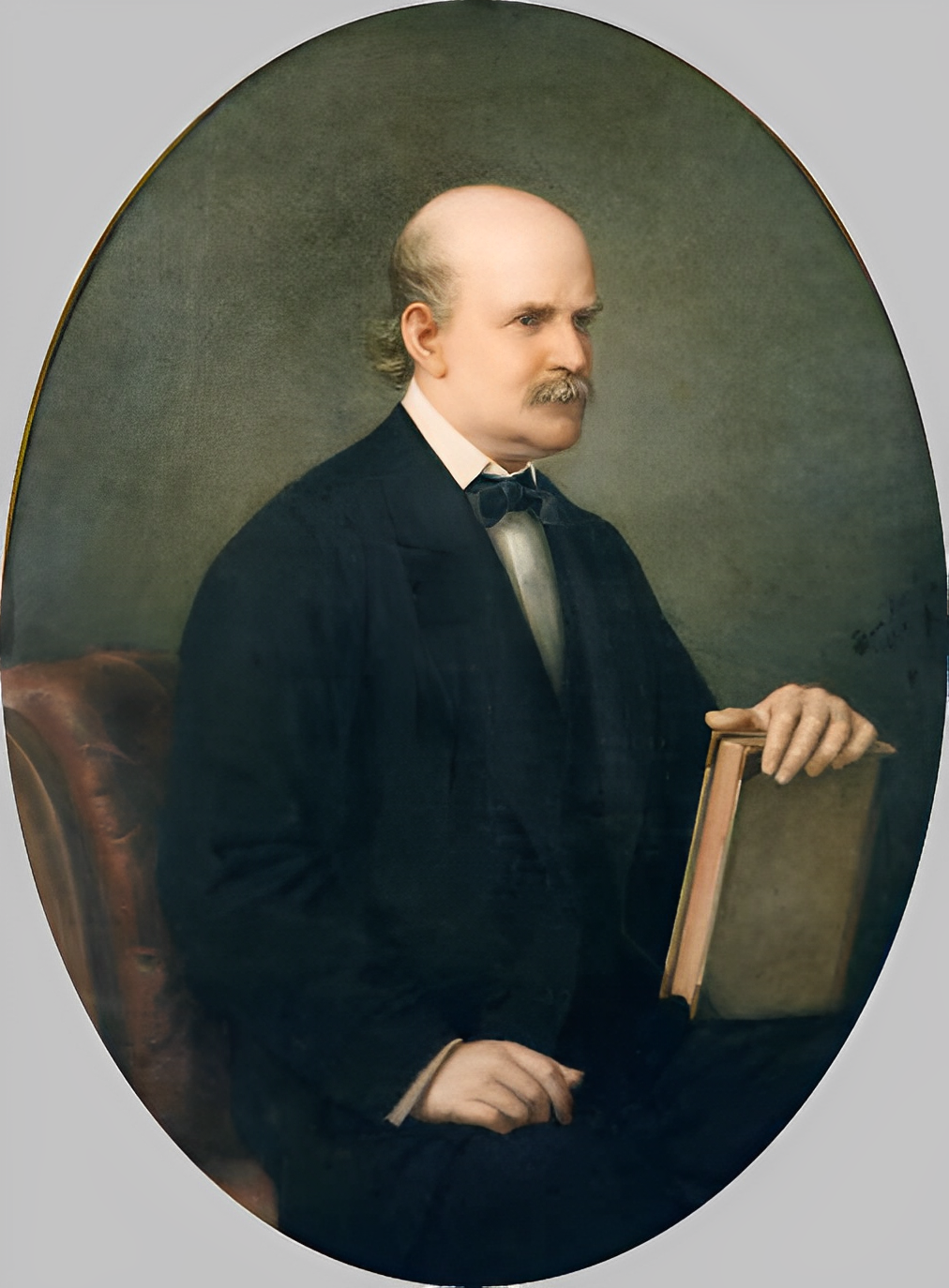
Portrait of Ignaz Semmelweis by Mór Than, painted for the university (1884)

The University of Nagyszombat (now Trnava), founded in 1635, was lacking medical training for a long time, so Hungarian doctors were only able to study at foreign universities or in private schools, and surgeons were trained in guilds. Maria Theresa’s court physician, following the Empress’s decree of 7 November 1769, developed the plan of the new faculty, on the basis of the Vienna model. In 1770, education began with five departments.

In 1777, the university, and thus medical education, moved to Buda, and in 1784, following Joseph II’s personal decree, to the other side of the Danube: to Pest. The rapidly developing Pest provided a wider range of ‘patient material’, and the departments also multiplied. There was space for a botanical garden, and anatomy as well actual patient care could also be taught more effectively.

At the end of the 19th century, the establishment of the present theoretical institutes and clinical departments started. Those buildings in Budapest are still in use after reconstruction and modernization. During the 20th and 21st centuries new clinics and institutes were built.

From 1951, the Faculty of Medicine continued as an independent medical school and in 1955, Faculties of Dentistry and Pharmaceutical Sciences were incorporated into the new medical university. In 1969, it adopted the name of its most famous professor, Ignáz Semmelweis.

Semmelweis University was the first Hungarian higher educational institution to offer an international program at the Faculty of Medicine in German in 1983, while its international program in English started in 1987, at the Faculties of Medicine, Dentistry and Pharmaceutical Sciences.

From 1 August 2021, the founder’s, owner’s and operator’s rights of Semmelweis University are exercised by the Foundation for National Health Care and Medical Education following the model change in higher education.

== Faculties ==
Semmelweis University is a specialised university offering undergraduate and graduate courses only in the field of health sciences. The university has more than 15,000 students from 120 nations, with foreign students accounting for about 37% of the total community. The largest and oldest faculty of the university is the Faculty of Medicine with 6,000 students accounting for 38% of the total number of students.

- András Pető Faculty
- Faculty of Dentistry
- Faculty of Health and Public Services
- Faculty of Health Sciences
- Faculty of Medicine
- Faculty of Pharmaceutical Sciences
- Doctoral College

== Academics ==
Education takes place in six faculties and three languages (Hungarian, English and German). More than 15,000 students are taking courses in One-tier Master Programmes and at Bachelor, Master's and Postgradual levels and 1,500 of them are granted a diploma each year.

=== Integrated master programs (one-tier master programs) ===
Medicine, Dentistry and Pharmacy run as one-tier master programs (integrated master) with a degree awarded at the end of five years of study in Dentistry and Pharmacy and six years in Medicine. These courses are one-tier degree courses, without intermediate exit, and are in alternative to the two-tier degree course scheme.

Courses in Medicine, Dentistry and Pharmacy are available in Hungarian, English and German.

=== Bachelor's programs ===
Bachelor's Programs of Semmelweis University are offered at the Faculty of Health Sciences and at Pető andrás Faculty. The length of the programs is 8 semesters (4 years) with a total of 240 credit points.

The following Bachelor's programs are available in English:

- Physiotherapy
- Nursing
- Midwifery
- Dietetics
- Medical diagnostic analysis – Optometry
- Public health supervisor
- Health care management
- Conductive education (Pető method)

The physiotherapy program is available in Italian within the framework of the university's off-campus program run in Lugano, Switzerland.

=== Master's programs ===
Master's programs are offered at the Faculty of Medicine, the Faculty of Health and Public Services and the Faculty of Health Sciences. The length and credit value of the programs vary.

The following Master's Programs are available in English:

- Physiotherapy
- Clinical Translational Medicine
- Systemic Psychology
- Psychobiology
- Pharmaceutical Innovation and Business Administration
- Nursing

=== Doctoral College ===
Semmelweis University's Doctoral College has 11 Divisions:

- Cardiovascular Medicine and Research
- Dental Research
- Health Sciences
- János Szentágothai Neurosciences
- Károly Rácz Conservative Medicine
- Mental Health Sciences
- Molecular Medicine
- Pathological and Oncological
- Pharmaceutical Sciences and Health Technologies
- Surgical Medicine
- Theoretical and Translational Medicine

Each school comprises 2 to 17 study programs that add up to over 100 topics. The Doctoral College of Semmelweis University integrates the research groups and programs of all Faculties entitled to issue Ph.D. degrees. The Doctoral College has around a hundred students obtaining their Ph.D. diplomas every year. The degrees are recognized by the European Union and are accepted in other countries.

== Research ==
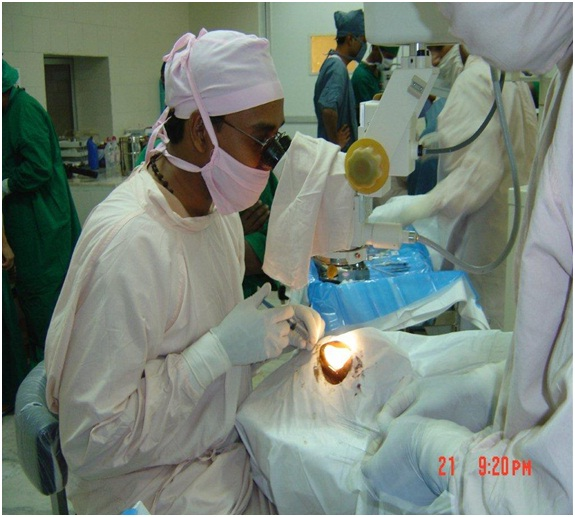
The iknife shortens the duration of a cancer surgery by determining the boundary between cancerous and healthy tissue almost immediately

Research, development, and innovation at Semmelweis University take place in the areas of living natural sciences, and social sciences. Within these, life science R&D activities are the most prominent. The scientific areas connected to the Ph.D. programme are theoretical, clinical, molecular and multidisciplinary medicine, pharmaceutical sciences, mental health sciences, and pathological sciences. Physical science research is limited to certain segments of theoretical medicine and social science research is employed in the areas of mental health.

R&D and training are incorporated into clinical and health sciences as well as into the university's educational activities and the curriculum. They are also included in the specialised networks operating at the university (e.g. nanotechnology, bioimaging, genomics, biobank), as well as in the research university modules (diagnostics, technology, therapy, prevention) and the collaborations which have been developing within these areas.

Semmelweis University's collection of academic journals comprises printed material, online resources (databases, full text e-journals, e-books, etc.) that may be accessed both on-campus and off-campus. The Central Library provides access to more than 5,000 full text e-journals and specialised databases through its website.

Patents connected to the university include the iKnife, a surgical device that is able to tell healthy and cancerous tissues apart immediately after the first cut, or the virtual 3D microscope, a device equipped with a microscope slide scanner able to scan 300 slides in one run and a 3D viewer that creates a spatial reconstruction of the serial specimen.

The university publishes the peer-reviewed journal Kaleidoscope: Művelődés- Tudomány- és Orvostörténeti Folyóirat (Kaleidoscope: Journal on the History of Culture, Science and Medicine) ISSN 2062-2597, which is rated ERIH PLUS by the European Reference Index for the Humanities and Social Sciences.

== International relations ==
Semmelweis University has a network of international partner agreements with around a hundred universities within the Erasmus+ network and 40 further universities in joint cooperation based on bilateral agreements.

=== Off-campus programs ===
The university operates cross-border programs allowing foreign students to follow the Semmelweis curriculum while undertaking their studies at the partner institution abroad. Venues of Semmelweis University's off-campus programs including Asklepios Kliniken in Hamburg, Westpfalz-Klinikum in Kaiserslauten, Libera Università degli Studi in Lugano, and the Health Management Academy in Bratislava.

=== International joint projects ===
Semmelweis University runs research and student exchange programmes in collaboration with several universities abroad based on bilateral agreements. The programmes offer scholarships to students with outstanding academic results and staff to study or do research at the partner institutions. The programmes are based on reciprocity and the length of exchange programmes may vary from one week to three months. Partner institutions include Jacobs School of Medicine and Biomedical Sciences, University of California Davis School of Medicine, Rutgers University, Medical University of Innsbruck, Saitama Medical University, University of Freiburg, Heidelberg University, University of Ulm, University of Padua, University of Trieste, and Jessenius Faculty of Medicine at Comenius University.

== Academic ranking ==
University rankings

Global – Overall
- ARWU World: 601–700 (2023)
- THE World: 251–300 (2024)
- USNWR Global: =653 (2023)

In QS World University Rankings 2025 subject rankings, Semmelweis University is among the world's top 300 universities in the fields of medicine, pharmaceutical training, and life and medical sciences.

In the 2026 Times Higher Education World University Rankings Semmelweis University was placed between 251 and 300.

== Buildings and sites ==
The university does not have a campus. Instead, its faculties, departments, hospitals, clinics, libraries, sport and accommodation facilities are scattered throughout the capital city Budapest. Some facilities are clustered, and most of its clinical departments belong to one of the three clinical blocks.

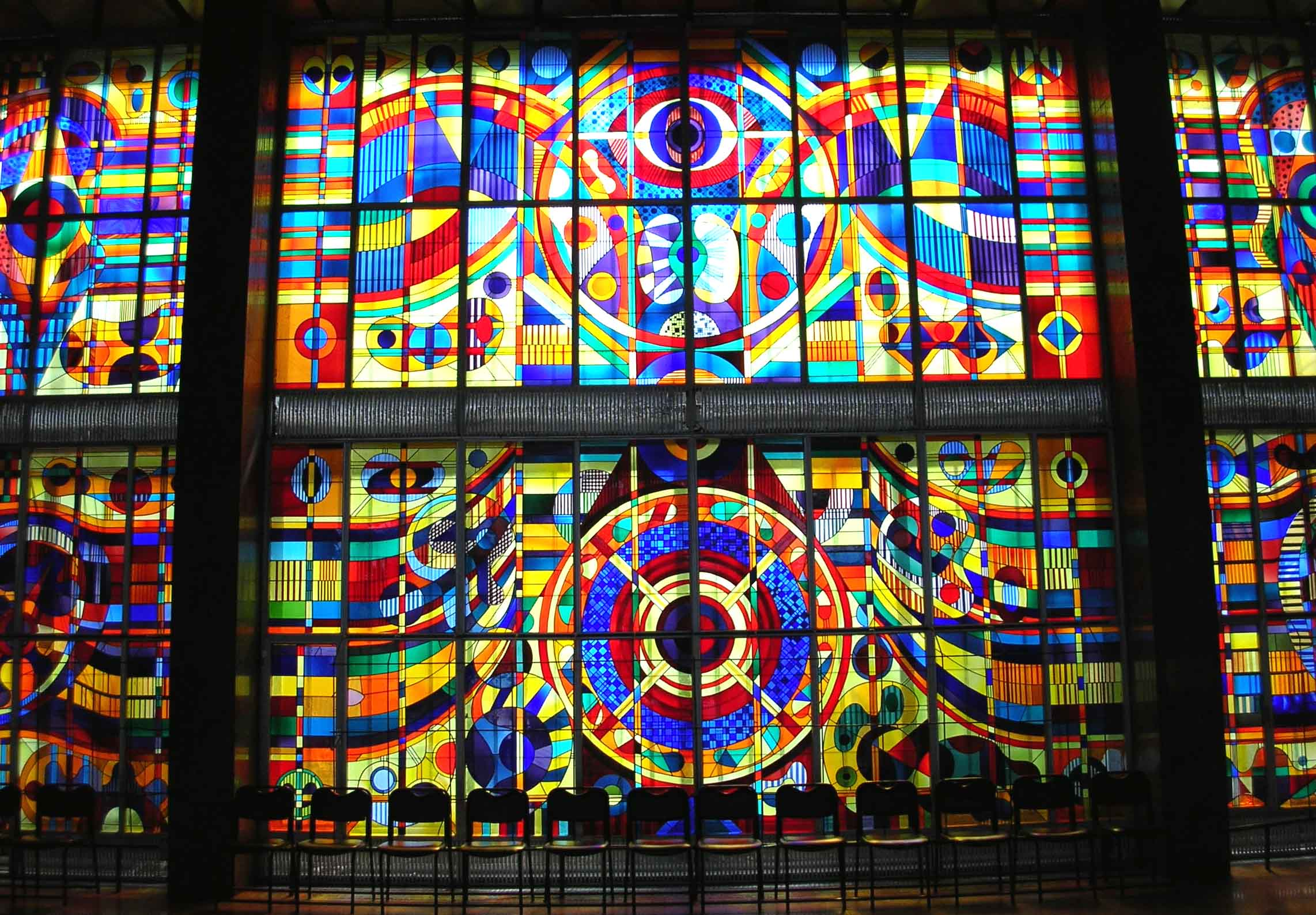
Stained glass window at the Theoretical Building at Nagyvárad tér

The university's Theoretical Building at Nagyvárad tér is one of the tallest high rise in Hungary. It houses several research institutions, a student centre, the office of the Students’ Union, auditoriums, conference halls and the country's largest stained glass installations.

The previously fragmented Faculty of Health Sciences was united in 2003 in the newly renovated Art Nouveau building of a former sanatorium. The faculty's building houses clinical skills laboratories and contains various social spaces for students to use, such as an atrium with couches and a garden.

The Dental Clinical and Training Centre was completed in 2007, accommodating clinics and institutions.

The Basic Medical Science Centre was built in 2008. Over a third of its area is used for scientific research, and it also has auditoriums and smaller lecture halls. The building is also home to several research groups that participate in international collaborations.

The Inner Clinical Block is located close to the Corvin-negyed metro station and contains the main building and some of the university's hospitals. The main building houses the Rector's Office, the Deans’ Offices and other organisational and administrative units, as well as Semmelweis Salon, a venue for scientific symposia.

== Administration ==
The main governing body of Semmelweis University is the Senate, with the rector as its president. It is endowed with the authority to make decisions and recommendations, to form opinions, and to supervise. The Senate determines the course of the university's educational and research activities and sees to their realisation, with due regard to the Founding Charter.

=== Leaders ===
The leadership of Semmelweis University consists of the Rector, responsible for educational and scientific affairs and the Chancellor, overseeing the financial matters of the university. The Rector is aided by five Vice-Rectors: the Vice-Rector for General Affairs, the Vice-Rector for Educational Affairs, the Vice-Rector for Science and Innovation, the Vice-Rector for Clinical Affairs and the Vice-Rector for Strategy and Development.

- Rector: Dr. Béla Merkely
- Chancellor: Dr. Lívia Pavlik
- Vice-Rector for General Affairs: Dr. Ferenc Bánhidy
- Vice-Rector for Educational Affairs: Dr. Péter Hermann
- Vice-Rector for Science and Innovation: Dr. Péter Ferdinandy
- Vice-Rector for Clinical Affairs: Dr. Attila Szabó
- Vice-Rector for Strategy and Development: Dr. Éva Szabó Feketéné
- Vice-Rector for International Studies: Dr. Alán Alpár

== Secondary schools maintained by Semmelweis University ==
Semmelweis University maintains several secondary schools as part of its educational institutions. These schools provide secondary-level education and vocational training, including in healthcare-related fields.

The secondary schools maintained by Semmelweis University are:

- Semmelweis Egyetem Raoul Wallenberg Többcélú Szakképző Intézménye
- Semmelweis Egyetem Bókay János Szakgimnáziuma és Szakközépiskolája
- Semmelweis Egyetem Semmelweis Ignác Többcélú Szakképző Intézménye
- Semmelweis Egyetem Kanizsai Dorottya Többcélú Szakképző Intézménye

== Notable people ==
- Ignác Semmelweis (1818–1865), popularly known as “the saviour of mothers”. He began his career in Vienna; it was there that he discovered the cause of puerperal fever. He left Vienna for the Medical Faculty of the Imperial and Royal University of Pest (now Semmelweis University), where he served as professor and director of the Department of Obstetrics and Gynaecology from 1855 to 1865.
- Albert Szent-Györgyi (1893–1986) is the only Hungarian Nobel laureate who received the distinction for research conducted in Hungary. He earned his diploma at the medical faculty in Budapest (now Semmelweis University). He successfully isolated vitamin C and discovered the components and reactions of the citric acid cycle at the University of Szeged. Szent-Györgyi returned to the University of Budapest's Faculty of Medicine after the war, but emigrated to the US in 1947.
- Gheorghe Constantin Roja (1786–1847), Aromanian doctor, philologist and historian
- Árpád Lengyel (physician) (1886–1940), RMS Carpathia ship's medical officer instrumental in the Titanic rescue effort
- Janos Szebeni, researcher, immunologist, and author.
- László Szollás (1907–1980), world champion and Olympic medalist pair skater.
- Judith Forrai (born 1949), Hungarian historian of science, medical historian, dentist, professor, doctor of the Hungarian Academy of Sciences, and journal editor-in-chief.
- Zoltán Kovács (born 1962), vice-president of the Hungarian Ice Hockey Federation and Paul Loicq Award recipient, graduated with Master of Physical Education degree in 1992 at the Faculty of Physical Education and Sport Sciences.

== Gallery ==
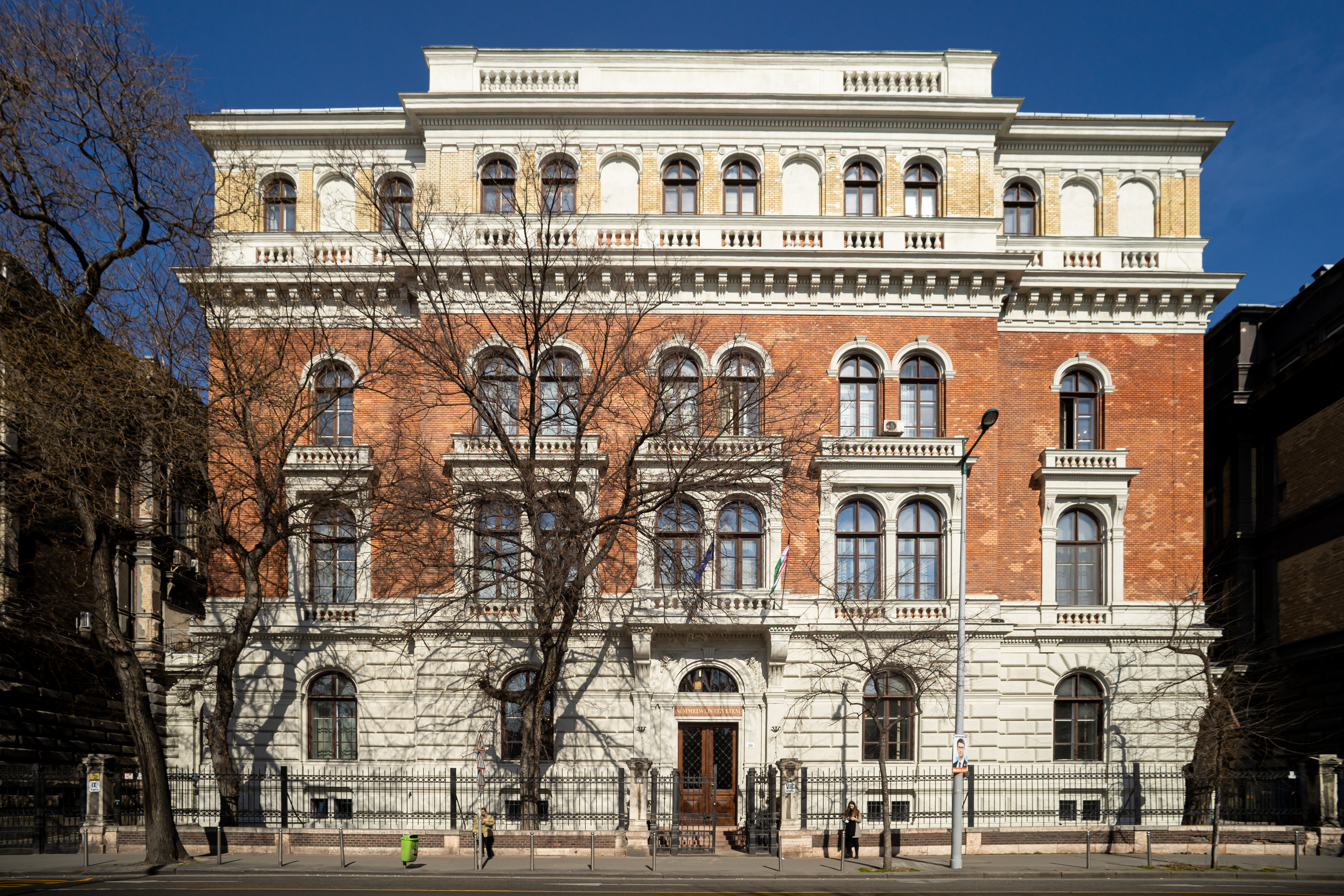
The Central Building of Semmelweis University (Rector"s Office) - Budapest, Üllői út 26.

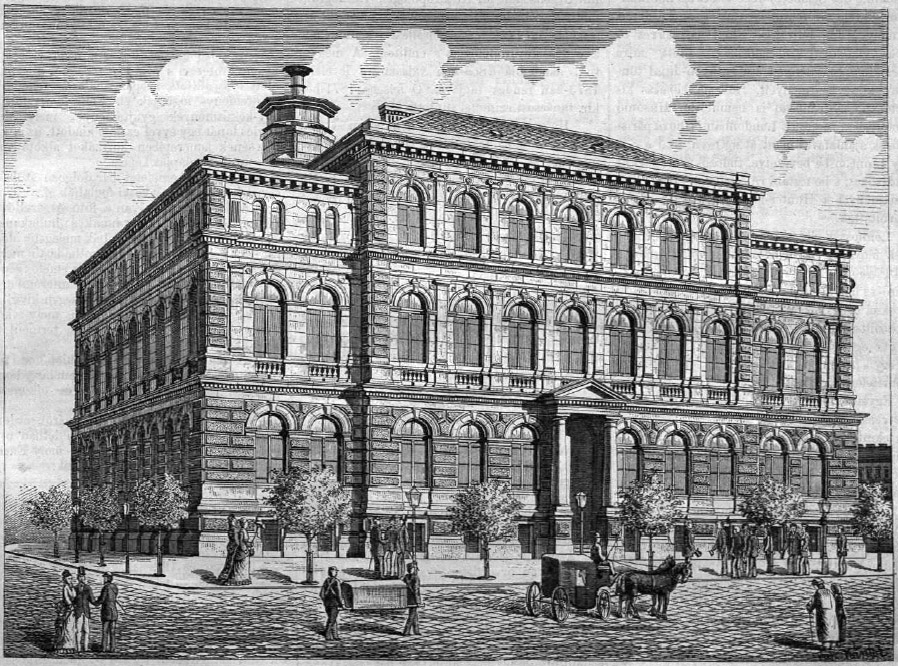
Building of the Anatomical Institute, inaugurated in 1878

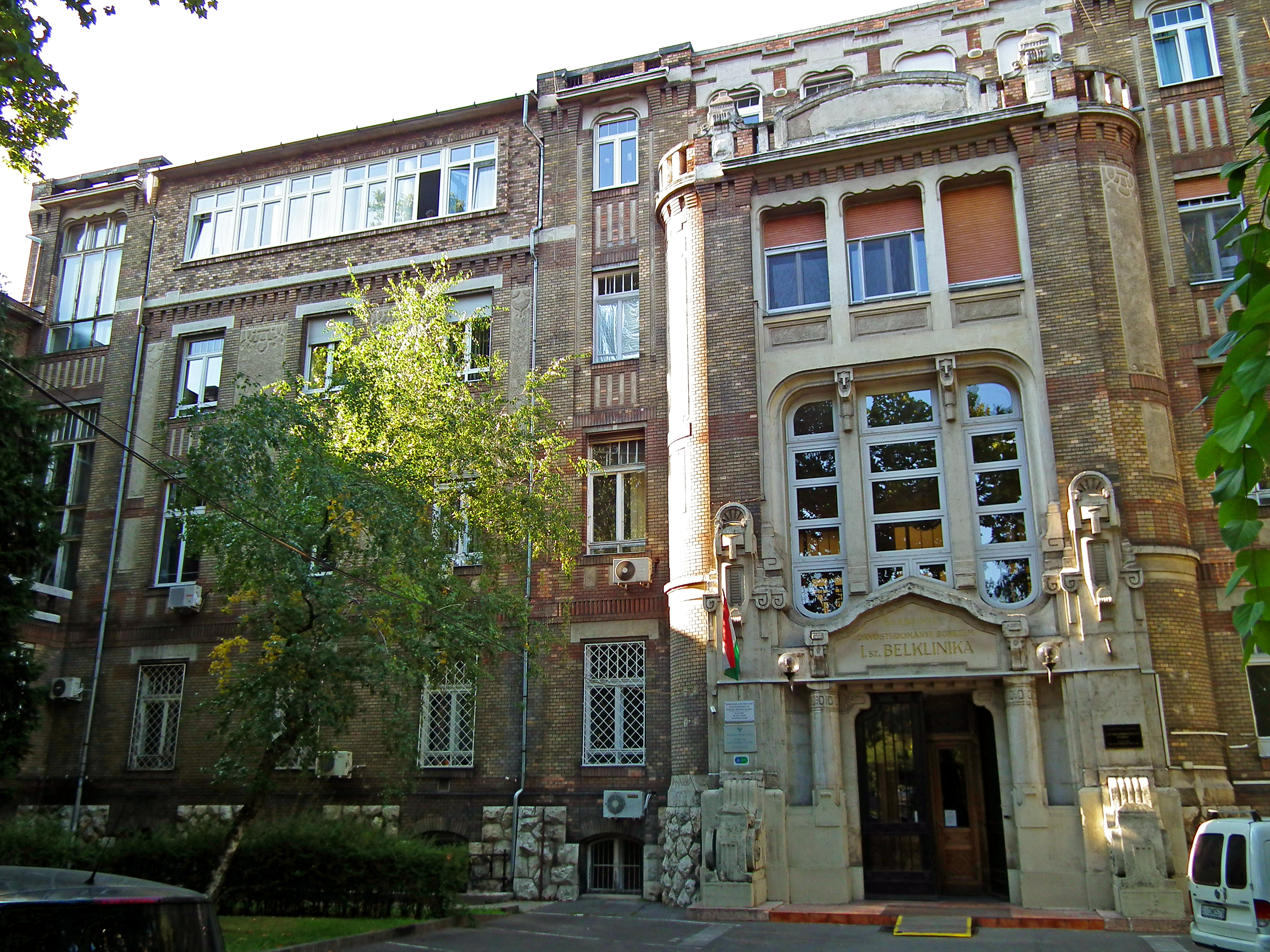
Department of Internal Medicine and Oncology, Józsefvárosi Clinical Complex

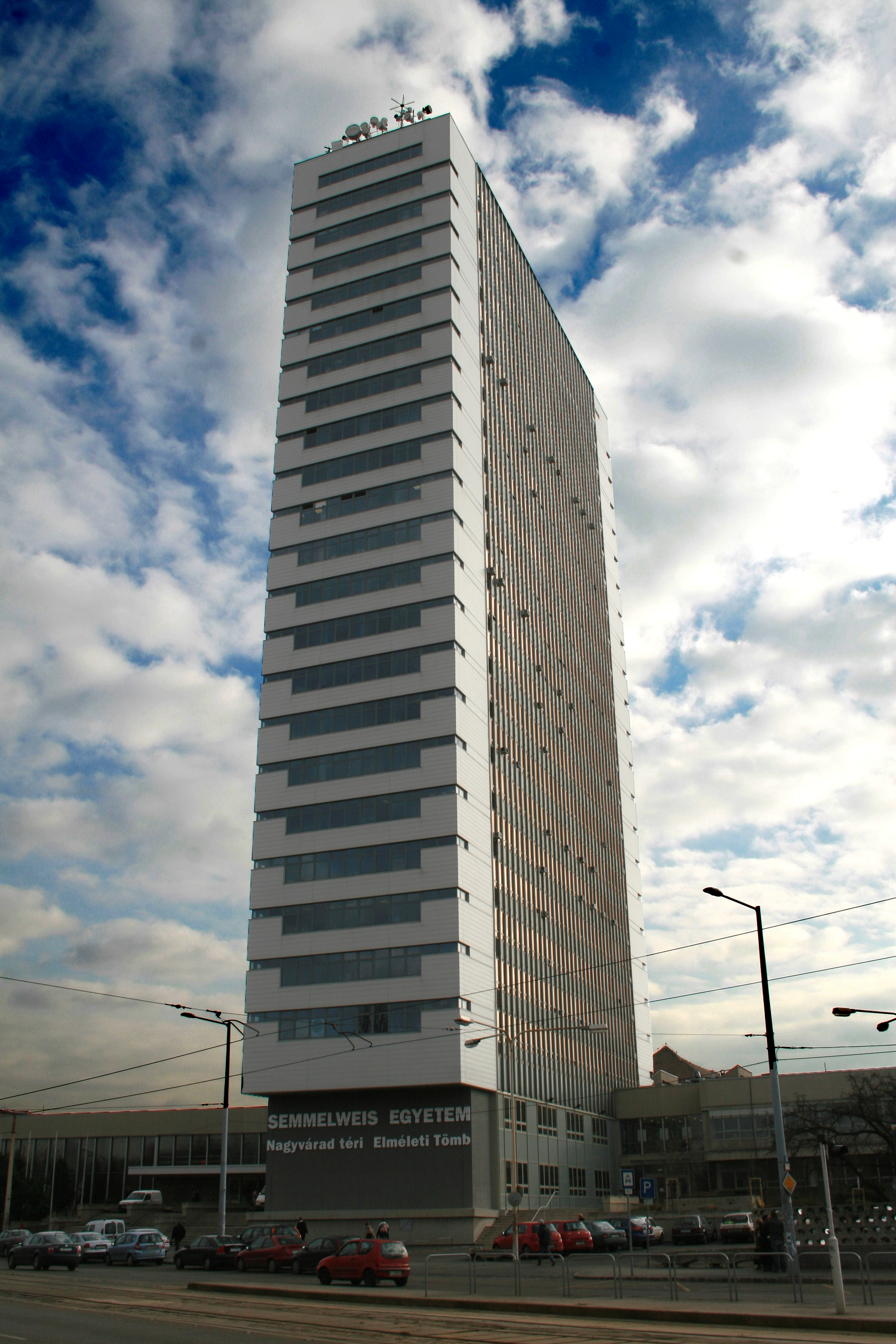
Semmelweis University Tower - Nagyvárad téri Theoretical Building

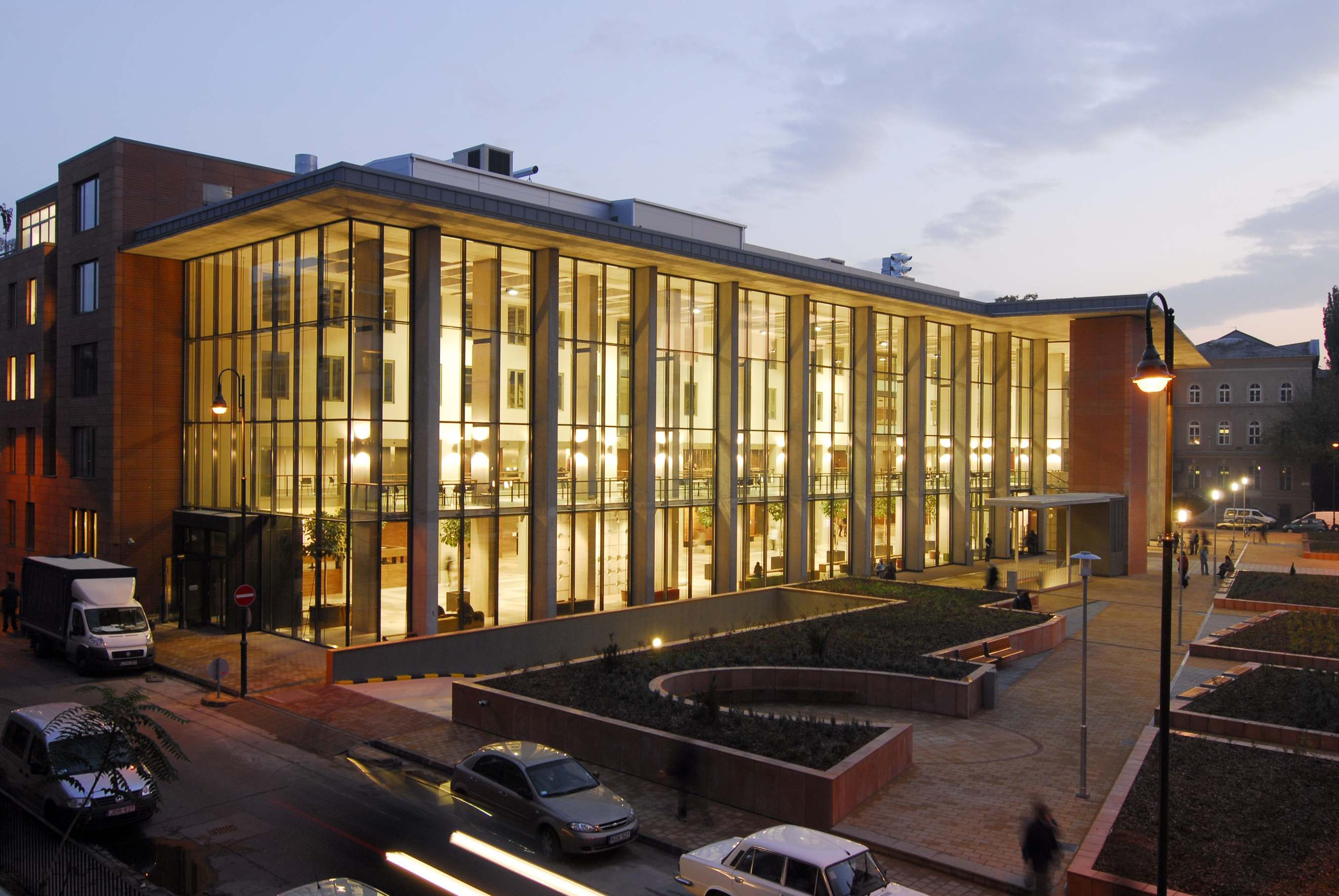
Basic Medical Science Center - Budapest, Tűzoltó street 37-47.

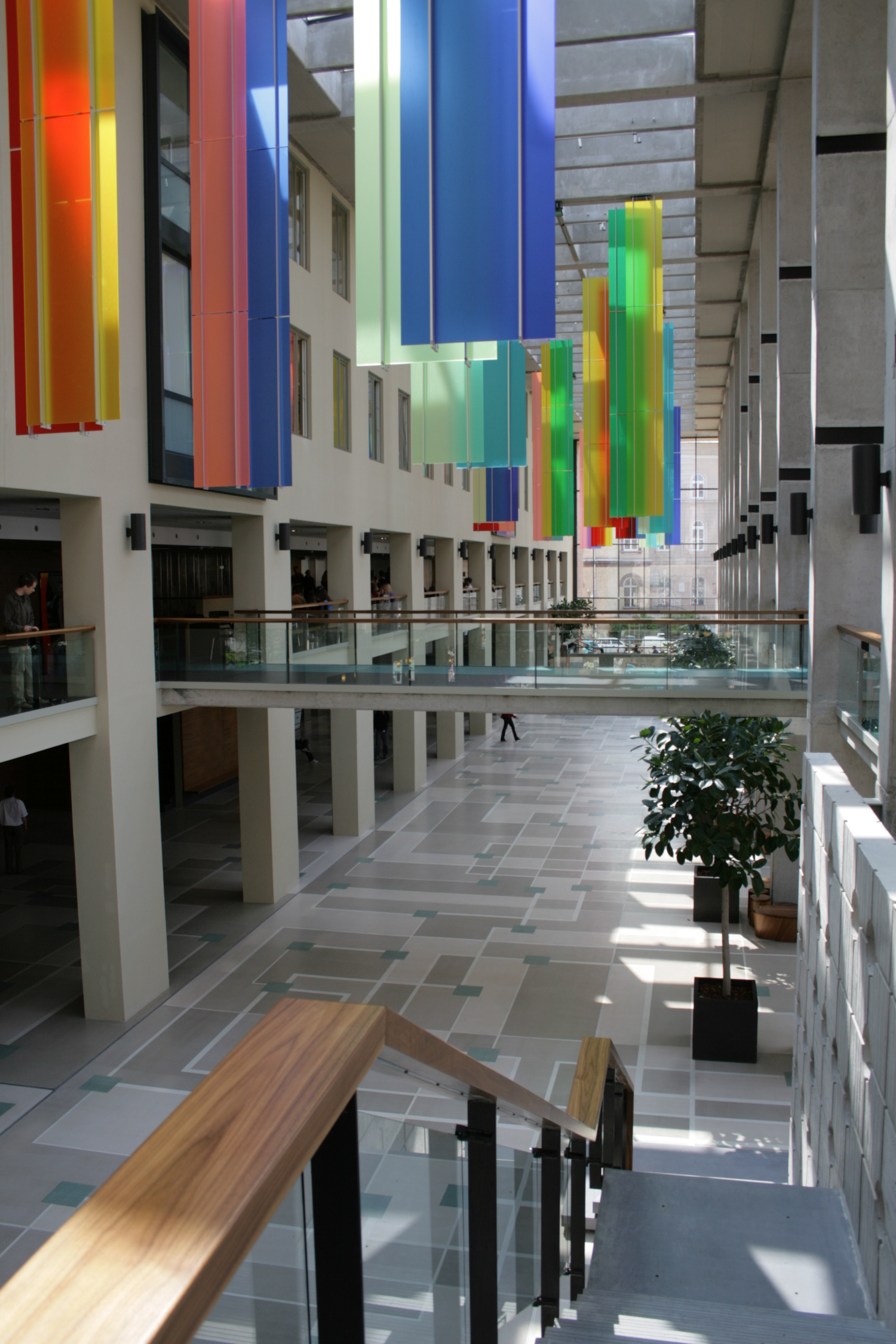
Basic Medical Science Center - Budapest, Tűzoltó street 37-47. (interior)

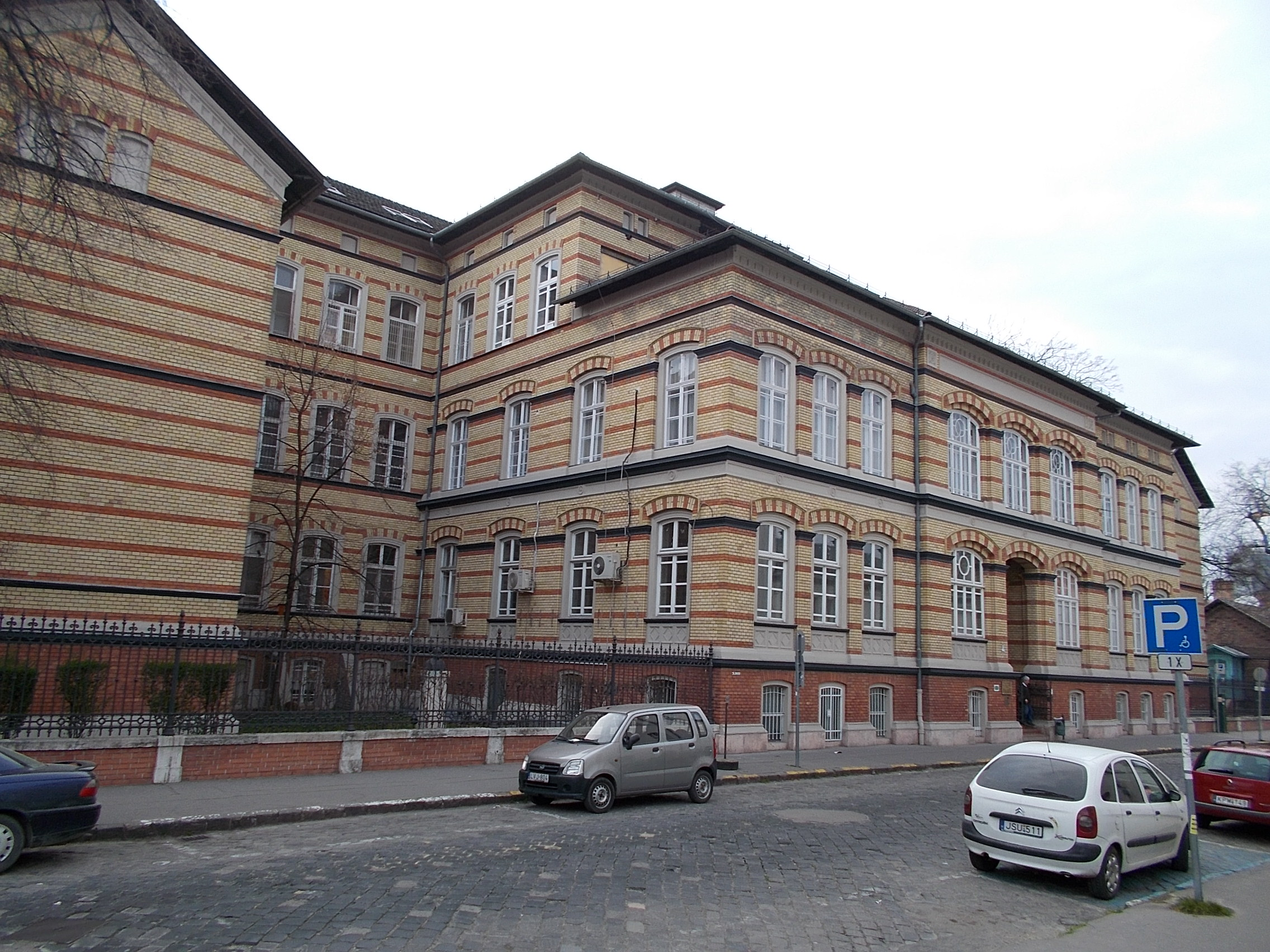
1 st Department of Paediatrics

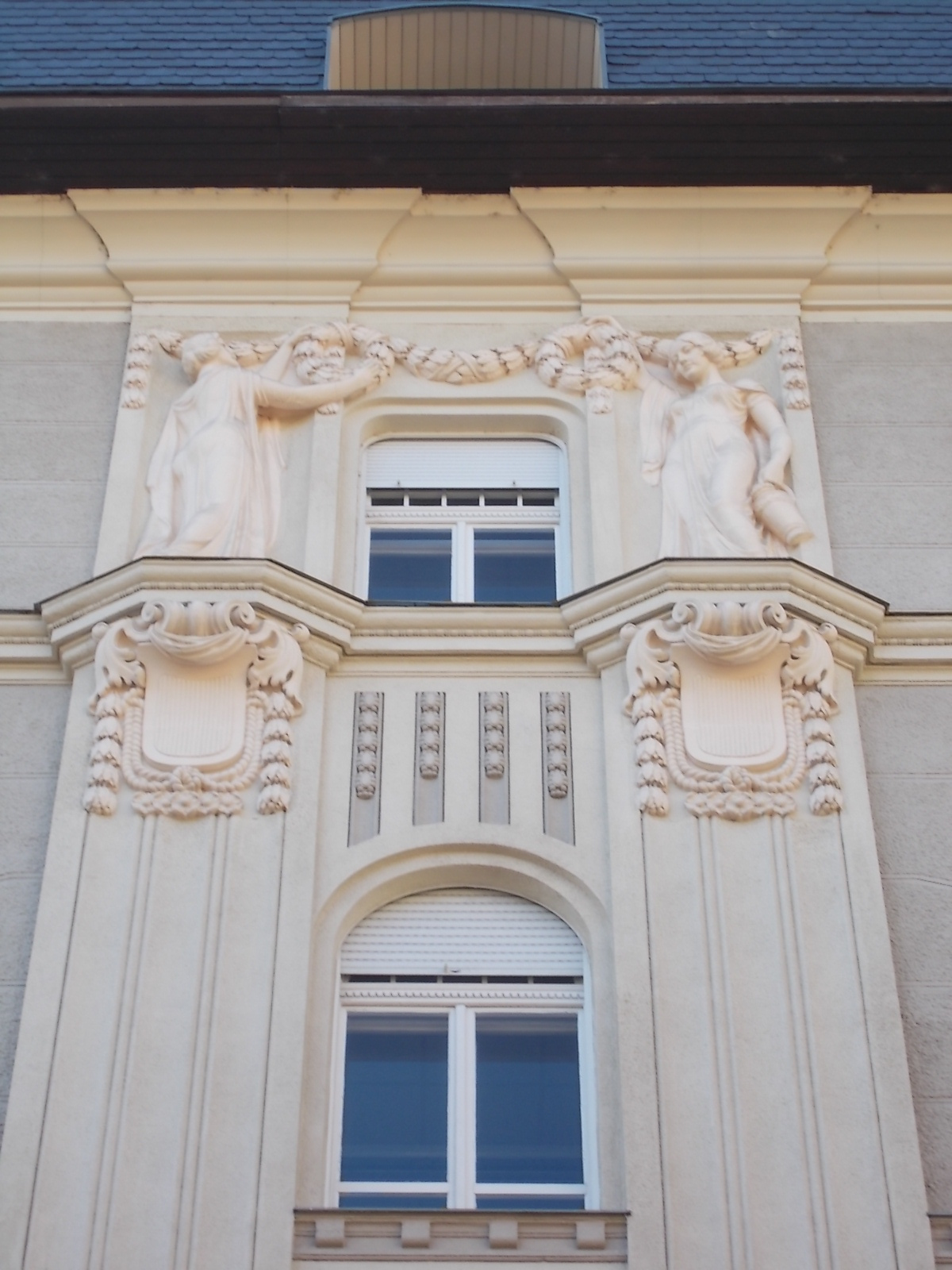
Facade of the Faculty of Health Sciences

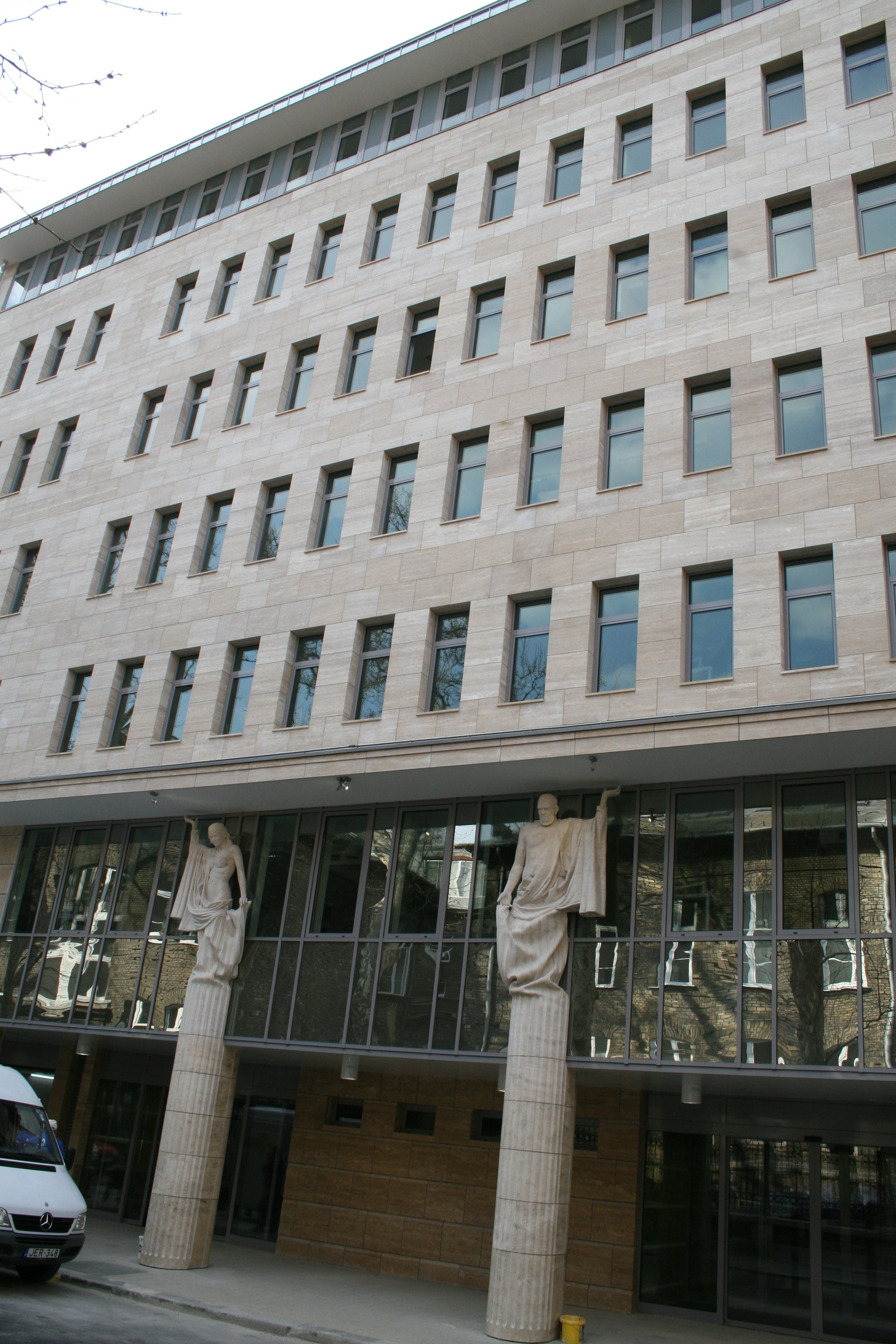
Dental Clinical and Training Centre - Budapest, Szentkirályi street

== See also ==
- List of universities and colleges in Hungary
- Education in Hungary
- Erasmus Programme
- iknife
- Ignaz Semmelweis
- Albert Szent-Györgyi
