= World Journal of Gastroenterology =

- Discipline: Gastroenterology
- Language: English
- Edited by: Andrzej S. Tarnawski

Publication details
- Former name: China National Journal of New Gastroenterology
- History: 1995-present
- Publisher: Baishideng Publishing Group
- Frequency: Weekly
- Open access: Yes
- License: Creative Commons Attribution-NonCommercial
- Impact factor: 5.742 (2020)

Standard abbreviations
- ISO 4: World J. Gastroenterol.

Indexing
- CODEN: WJGAF2
- ISSN: 1007-9327 (print); 2219-2840 (web)
- OCLC no.: 41888177

Links
- Journal homepage; Online access; Online archive; PubMed Central archive

World Journal of Gastroenterology is a weekly peer-reviewed open access medical journal that covers research in gastroenterology. It was established in 1995 and is published by Baishideng Publishing Group. The editor-in-chief is Andrzej S. Tarnawski (California State University, Long Beach).

== Abstracting and indexing ==
The journal is abstracted and indexed in:

- CAB Abstracts
- Chemical Abstracts
- Current Contents/Clinical Medicine
- Index Medicus/MEDLINE/PubMed/PubMed Central
- Science Citation Index Expanded

In 2004, the journal was delisted from the Journal Citation Reports for excessive self-citation, but it was restored to this index in 2008, at which time its impact factor was determined to be 2.081. According to the Journal Citation Reports, the journal has a 2020 impact factor of 5.742, ranking it 28th out of 92 journals in the category "Gastroenterology and Hepatology".
