= Bourne Publishing Group =

Bourne Publishing Group (BPG) is a small publishing group based in Stamford, Lincolnshire, England. Founded in 1989 as an independent private publisher formed primarily to publish a new launch (the Shooting Gazette) but with the long-term objective of adding other titles.

BPG was started in offices in Bourne, Lincolnshire with three full-time staff members and a part-time secretary. It relocated to Stamford at the end of 1998 and there are now more than 35 employees and numerous freelancers.

== Titles ==
Other titles were added, including the CPSA's PULL! magazine in 1990 and BASC's Shooting & Conservation in 1992.

== Your Cat ==
Your Cat and Your Dog magazines were added under licence from EMAP in 1999. The magazines were showing a slide in sales and ad revenues since successful launches, and EMAP felt that they were not of a size (or indeed subject matter) that fitted in with their strategies.

Your Cat was launched in 1994. Other titles operating in the market are Cat World, a monthly publication, and Our Cats, a weekly title aimed at the showing side of cat ownership. 2004 marked the tenth anniversary of the Your Cat magazine.

== Your Dog ==
Your Dog was launched in 1995. Competitors in the market are Dogs Today, a monthly magazine and Our Dogs and Dogs World, two weekly papers aimed at the show circuit. In March 2008, Dogs Monthly was acquired by a new publisher and re-launched very much as a look alike to Your Dog. The title has continued to post circulation increases in the last three ABC (Audit Bureau of Circulations UK) audit periods.

In 2003, BPG purchased the titles from EMAP.

== Horse & Pony ==
Horse & Pony was re-launched in 2005 under a licence agreement with EMAP after an absence of four years following their closure of the title when their focus was turned exclusively to Your Horse. As a youth equestrian magazine, Horse & Pony sponsors the Pony Club.

== Fieldsports ==
Fieldsports is the most recent publication to be launched by BPG, initially as a quarterly bookazine retailed exclusively through WH Smith before widening out through the rest of the news trade estate. It is aimed at the top end of the game shooting market and also includes game fishing for the average shot who swops gun for rod out of season.

== The Scottish Sporting Gazette ==
The Scottish Sporting Gazette & International Traveller was acquired by BPG from John Ormiston in 1998. This is a ‘coffee table’ annual which concentrates itself on all things Scottish.

== Websites ==
BPG has remained a small specialist publisher, whose emphasis revolves around creating niche titles with a small workforce. As of January 2008, the company has invested heavily in online sites for its titles.
