= Janos Szebeni =

Hungarian immunologist

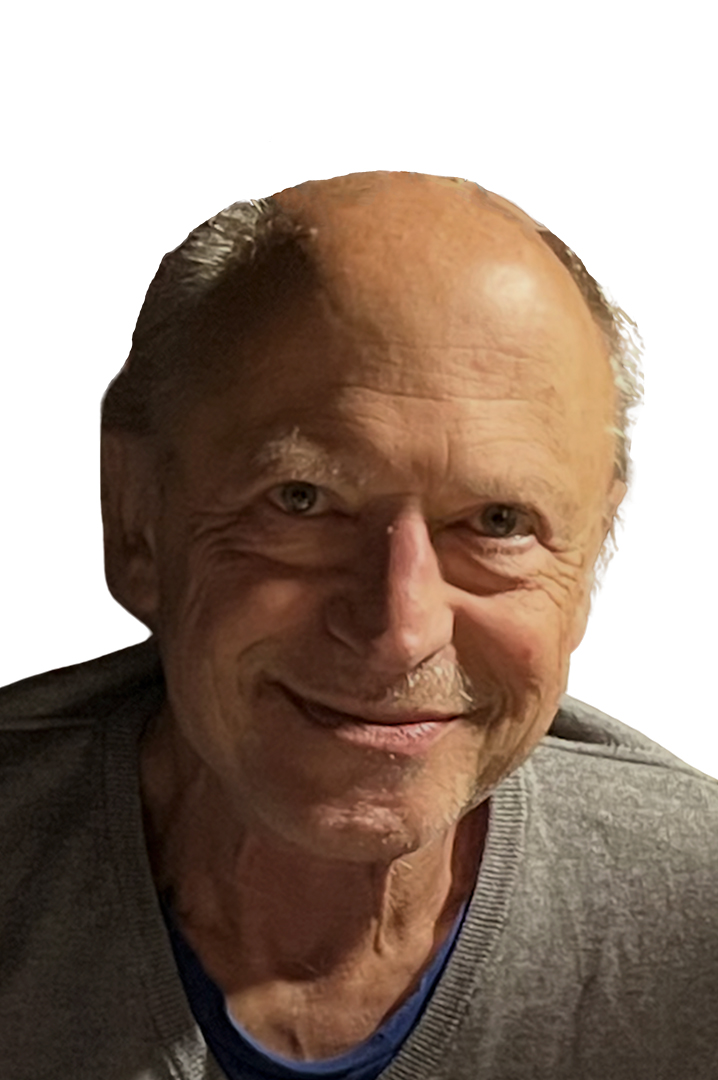
- Occupations: Medical researcher, immunologist, and author

Academic background
- Education: M.D. Ph.D. D.Sc.
- Alma mater: Semmelweis Medical University; Hungarian Academy of Sciences

Academic work
- Institutions: Semmelweis University; University of Miskolc

Janos Szebeni is a medical researcher, immunologist, and author. His research work has centered on the adverse immune effects of nanomedicines, particularly liposomes and lipid nanoparticles. He was among the early contributors to the development of liposome-encapsulated hemoglobin, a universal blood substitute, and the identification of complement activation as a key mechanism of nanoparticle-induced hypersensitivity reactions and anaphylaxis, also known as "complement activation-related pseudoallergy" (CARPA).

Szebeni directs the Nanomedicine Research and Education Center within the Department of Translational Medicine at Semmelweis University. He is also the co-founder and CEO of SeroScience.

== Education ==
Szebeni earned his M.D. from Semmelweis Medical University in 1978. He subsequently received his Ph.D. in 1992 and his Doctor of Science (D.Sc.) degree in 2006 from the Hungarian Academy of Sciences. He was habilitated at Semmelweis University in 2009.

== Career ==
Szebeni began his career as a research associate at the Hungarian National Institute of Hematology and Blood Transfusion in Budapest, Hungary, from 1978 to 1983, followed by a position as research scientist at the National Institute of Food Hygiene and Nutrition between 1983 and 1985. In 1986 and 1987, he held research fellowships at Christchurch Medical School, ETH-Zentrum; and at the University of Arizona. From 1987 to 1991, he held the appointment of visiting scientist at the National Cancer Institute. From 1993, he was working at the Department of Membrane Biochemistry, Walter Reed Army Institute of Research as a Senior NRC fellow, where he was promoted in 1998 as a section chief at the U.S. Military HIV Research Program (MHRP).

At the University of Miskolc, Szebeni taught biology and immunobiology as an adjunct professor and was appointed full professor in 2013. He also led the Nanomedicine Research and Education Center at Semmelweis University. There, he was promoted to full professor in 2020. He is the co-founder, CEO, and chief scientist of SeroScience. He also participated in 7 EU "FP7" and "H2020 programs and as PI and Project Coordinator in a Horizon Spinning program.

== Research ==
During his early research in the 1980s, Szebeni and others studied liposome-encapsulated hemoglobin (LEH) as a potential blood substitute. These studies explored the interactions between membrane lipids and hemoglobin, revealing an essential role of membrane cholesterol in protecting hemoglobin from degradation through heme partition into the bilayer, and the complement-activating effect of LEH. He and his colleagues proposed that complement activation could play a causal role in many hypersensitivity reactions and anaphylaxis observed after injection of liposomal drugs in animals and humans. He demonstrated that HSRs associated with C activation and a non-IgE-mediated pseudoallergy (CARPA) are clinically relevant due to their unpredictable nature and potential for fatal consequences. Analogous between stress reaction and CARPA was proposed, documenting that CARPA represents a blood stress reaction operating along the complement–allergomedin–circulatory system axis. In this context, he also worked on the technical terms: Doxebo (empty placebo Doxil), allergomedins (mast cell- and basophil-secreted allergy-triggering proteins), and CIPA (Complement-Independent Pseudo-Allergy). He, along with his colleagues, developed the porcine model of CARPA. He emphasized that the binding between PEGylated liposomes and anti-PEG IgM causes complement activation, resulting in blood clearance and anaphylactoid shock of liposome-IgM complexes, and documented that complement activation contributes to the severe HSRs caused by PEGylated nanomedicines and lipid nanoparticles (LNPs), the carriers of mRNA in the widely used COVID-19 vaccines, Comirnaty and Spikevax.

Beyond these research areas, Szebeni has also contributed to the fields of membrane transport, AIDS combination chemotherapy using dipyridamole, bone marrow transplantation and graft-versus-host disease. He was the lead author in the research study of the unusual compliance of Comirnaty lipoplexes and hydrogen bonding between mRNA and ionizable lipids. He is a coeditor of the books, The Complement System: Novel Roles in Health and Disease and the Immune Aspects of Biopharmaceuticals and Nanomedicines.

== Awards and honors ==
- 2019 – Honorary Citizen of the University of Miskolc
- 2024 – Szent-Gyorgyi Albert Medical Award, Ministry of Education
