= Árpád Lengyel (physician) =

Hungarian physician (1886–1940)

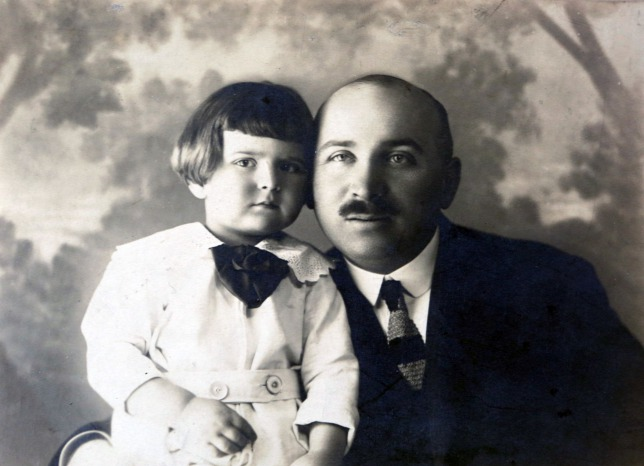
- Born: Árpád Weisz; 19 March 1886; Pilismarót, Austria-Hungary
- Died: 8 September 1940 (age 54); Budapest, Hungary
- Resting place: Kerepesi Cemetery
- Citizenship: Austro-Hungarian (1886–1920); Hungarian (1920–1940)
- Education: Eötvös Loránd University
- Occupation: physician
- Years active: 1904–1940
- Known for: Ship's doctor of RMS Carpathia at the time of the Titanic disaster
- Honours: Military Merit Medal

Árpád Lengyel, né Árpád Weisz (19 March 1886 – 8 September 1940) was a Hungarian physician, and ship's medical officer of the RMS Carpathia at the time of the sinking of the RMS Titanic. He played a key role in the salvage operation, welcoming the survivors on board the Carpathia.

== Life ==
He was born into a Jewish family in Pilismarót in 1886, the son of Ede Weisz, a merchant, and Matild Gutfreund. He completed his primary and secondary school education in Esztergom and Budapest, then in 1904 he joined the Budapest Volunteer Ambulance Association (BÖME). In 1909, he graduated from the Eötvös Loránd University of Budapest Faculty of Medicine (now Semmelweis University), specialising in laryngology. The young doctor started working at the St. Rókus Hospital and continued to work for the BÖME, now as an ambulance doctor. In 1912, following a classified advertisement, he applied for a job with the Cunard Line, which was looking for a doctor of Hungarian origin who could speak English well, because of the health problems on board ships during the emigration to the United States, which was then becoming very large in Austria-Hungary.

=== Onboard the Carpathia ===
The shipping company assigned Lengyel to the RMS Carpathia as ship's doctor for third class passengers. He signed his employment contract on 19 March 1912. His first voyage on board the ship was from Fiume (now Rijeka, Croatia) to New York. Carpathia sailed into New York on 29 March and returned to Fiume twelve days later with 725 people on board. Passengers included both Hungarians returning to their homeland or visiting, and wealthy Americans, mainly in first class, on European excursions. Carpathia's voyage to Fiume was uneventful until the early hours of 15 April 1912. At 0.25 a.m., however, Carpathia radio operator Harold Cottam picked up a distress call from the RMS Titanic, which had struck an iceberg and was then 58 nautical miles (93;km) from Carpathia. Captain Arthur Rostron immediately gave the order for the ship to change course and set sail to rescue the Titanic's passengers. Captain Rostron decided that the survivors should be hoisted aboard the ship through the between-deck entrance nearest the waterline. The captain put Árpád Lengyel in charge of the rescue, as he was the only one of the three doctors with experience as a paramedic. All the survivors were in a state of shock, unable to grip the rope ladders lowered from the hatchway with their frozen, numb hands. One by one, the survivors were pulled up to the hold with the help of pulleys. Lengyel met the survivors at the entrance to the hold and performed a quick initial diagnosis, on the basis of which the men were escorted to the prepared first aid stations, so he met all the 710 survivors. In his memoirs, Árpád Lengyel wrote: "We could hardly cope with all the work and consolation. It was horrible to see all these people, women screaming for their husbands and children who were lost before their eyes, and here and there lonely children who had lost their parents. We comforted the poor with sobbing hearts... It was a very sad journey back (to New York), with only weeping and wailing everywhere..."

According to the granddaughter of Árpád Lengyel, the rescue of the shipwreck's survivors was a huge emotional shock for him, and he was not keen to talk about it even later, except for one or two professional requests.

=== After the disaster ===
Árpád Lengyel never set sail again. He participated in World War I as an army doctor, serving as an ensign. After the war, he continued his work as a laryngologist and ambulance doctor, then as a teacher. In 1919, he married Margit, daughter of Arnold Berger and Gizella Greiner, an Israelite couple, in Budapest. He did not talk about his memories of the Titanic at all, except for one or two professional invitations. From the 1920s he was a factory doctor at BKV. Then another personal tragedy struck him: in February 1927, his six-year-old son died of Diphtheria. He opened a private practice in 1934 and died of a heart attack in 1940 at the age of 54.

== Memory ==
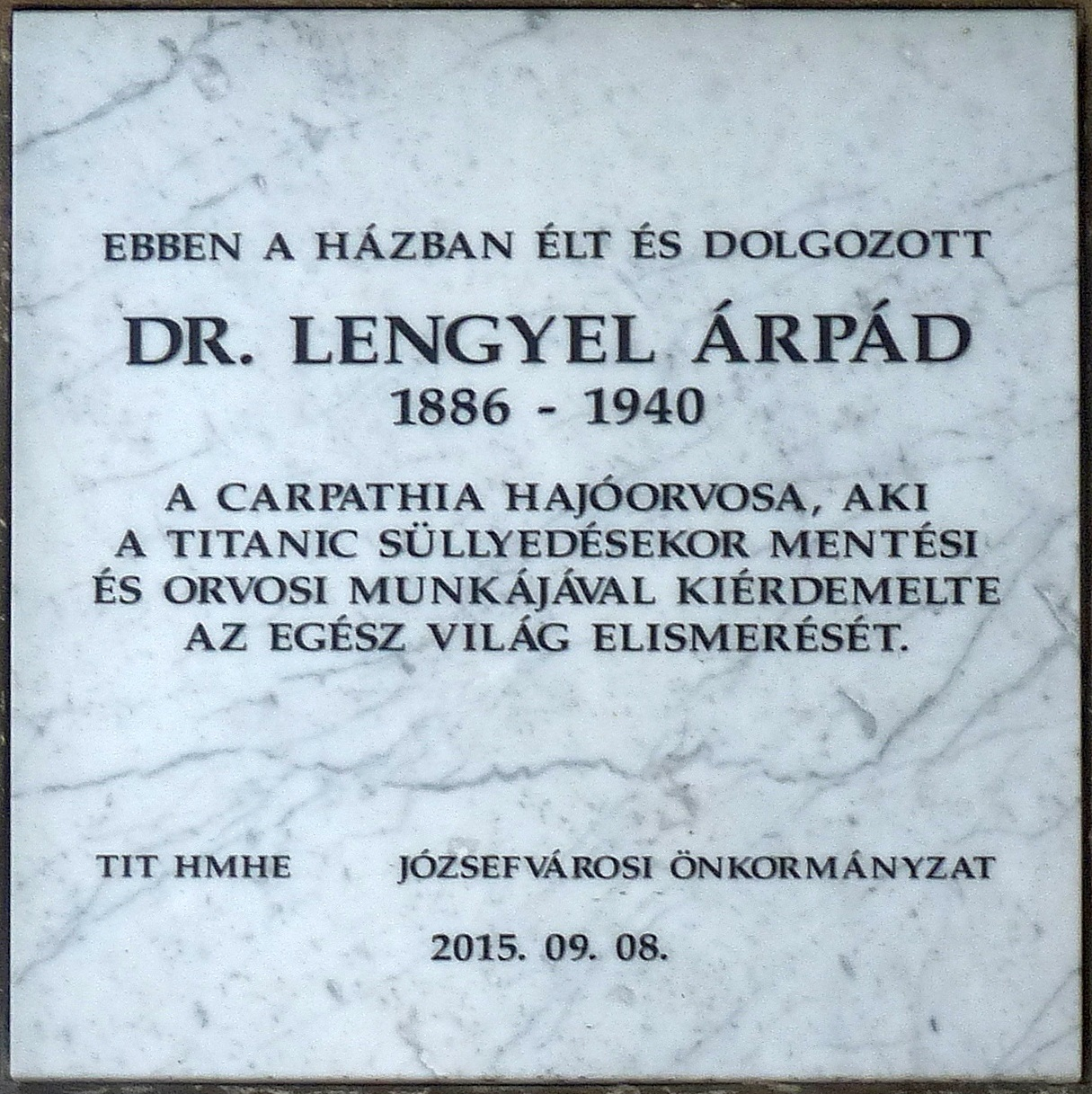
Wall plaque on his former residence.The text reads : In this house lived and worked DR. ÁRPÁD LENGYEL1886 - 1940 The Carpathia's ship's doctor, who earned the recognition of the entire world with his rescue and medical work during the sinking of the Titanic.TIT HMHE Józssefváros municipality

He received no official state honours for his services in Hungary. Archduke Joseph and Princess Auguste invited him once for a talk and once for a dinner, and several newspaper articles about him appeared. At home, the only medal he received from the ambulance service was the Iron Medal, the highest award in the profession. On the other hand, the rescued passengers of the Titanic made a gold medal for the officers of Carpathia including Lengyel. The Liverpool Shipwreck & Humane Society presented him with a silver medal and a certificate of honour in his name.
