= Baishideng Publishing Group =

Academic journal publishing company

- Parent company: Baishideng Publishing Group Inc
- Status: Active
- Predecessor: Baishideng Publishing Group Co., Limited
- Founded: 1993
- Country of origin: United States
- Headquarters location: Pleasanton, California
- Distribution: Worldwide
- Key people: Lian-Sheng Ma (President)
- Official website: www.wjgnet.com

Baishideng Publishing Group (BPG; Chinese: 百世登出版集团) is a publisher of medical journals based in Pleasanton, California. It was established on January 15, 1993, and originally published only one journal: the Chinese-language Journal of New Digestology (renamed to the World Chinese Journal of Digestology in 1999; 世界华人消化杂志). Its second journal was the World Journal of Gastroenterology, originally launched in 1995 as the China National Journal of New Gastroenterology. As of 2017, the company published 43 journals, 42 in English and one in Chinese.

The company joined the Association of Learned and Professional Society Publishers (ALPSP) in 2017. They are also a member of the Open Access Scholarly Publishers Association (OASPA). All 43 of BPG's journals are members of the Committee on Publication Ethics (COPE).

Baishideng Publishing Group was listed on the 'original' Beall's List of potential predatory open access publishers. The publisher has persisted in being listed at a successor to Beall's List, Stop Predatory Journals. BPG was named in a 2019 cover story of The Walrus as a "junk publisher" alongside Scientific Research Publishing, World Academy of Science, Engineering and Technology, and OMICS International.

== Journals ==
BPG used the "F6Publishing system" as of 2017, an integrated web-based platform designed by BPG to facilitate the multiple processes, reviews and approvals involved in academic publishing.

- World Journal of Anesthesiology ISSN 2218-6182
- World Journal of Biological Chemistry ISSN 1949-8454
- World Journal of Cardiology ISSN 1949-8462
- World Journal of Clinical Cases ISSN 2307-8960
- World Journal of Clinical Infectious Diseases ISSN 2220-3176
- World Journal of Clinical Oncology ISSN 2218-4333
- World Journal of Clinical Pediatrics ISSN 2219-2808
- World Journal of Clinical Urology ISSN 2219-2816
- World Journal of Critical Care Medicine ISSN 2220-3141
- World Journal of Dermatology
- World Journal of Diabetes
- World Journal of Experimental Medicine
- World Journal of Gastroenterology
- World Journal of Gastrointestinal Endoscopy
- World Journal of Gastrointestinal Oncology
- World Journal of Gastrointestinal Pathophysiology
- World Journal of Gastrointestinal Pharmacology and Therapeutics
- World Journal of Gastrointestinal Surgery
- World Journal of Hematology
- World Journal of Hepatology
- World Journal of Hypertension
- World Journal of Immunology
- World Journal of Medical Genetics
- World Journal of Meta-Analysis
- World Journal of Methodology
- World Journal of Nephrology
- World Journal of Neurology
- World Journal of Obstetrics and Gynecology
- World Journal of Ophthalmology
- World Journal of Orthopedics
- World Journal of Otorhinolaryngology
- World Journal of Pharmacology
- World Journal of Psychiatry
- World Journal of Radiology
- World Journal of Respirology
- World Journal of Rheumatology
- World Journal of Stem Cells
- World Journal of Stomatology
- World Journal of Surgical Procedures
- World Journal of Translational Medicine
- World Journal of Transplantation
- World Journal of Virology
- 世界华人消化杂志
