= Translational medicine =

Conversion to apply basic biomedical science to clinical practice

Translational medicine (often called translational science, of which it is a form) develops the clinical practice applications of the basic science aspects of the biomedical sciences; that is, it translates basic science to applied science in medical practice. It is defined by the European Society for Translational Medicine as "an interdisciplinary branch of the biomedical field supported by three main pillars: benchside, bedside, and community". The goal of translational medicine is to combine disciplines, resources, expertise, and techniques within these pillars to promote enhancements in prevention, diagnosis, and therapies. Accordingly, translational medicine is a highly interdisciplinary field, the primary goal of which is to coalesce assets of various natures within the individual pillars in order to improve the global healthcare system significantly.

== History ==
Translational medicine is a rapidly growing discipline in biomedical research and aims to expedite the discovery of new diagnostic tools and treatments by using a multi-disciplinary, highly collaborative, "bench-to-bedside" approach. Within public health, translational medicine is focused on ensuring that proven strategies for disease treatment and prevention are actually implemented within the community. One prevalent description of translational medicine, first introduced by the Institute of Medicine's Clinical Research Roundtable, highlights two roadblocks (i.e., distinct areas in need of improvement): the first translational block (T1) prevents basic research findings from being tested in a clinical setting; the second translational block (T2) prevents proven interventions from becoming standard practice.

The National Institutes of Health has made a major push to fund translational medicine, especially within biomedical research, with a focus on cross-functional collaborations (e.g., between researchers and clinicians); leveraging new technology and data analysis tools; and increasing the speed at which new treatments reach patients. In December 2011, The National Center for Advancing Translational Science was established within the National Institutes of Health to "transform the translational science process so that new treatments and cures for disease can be delivered to patients faster." The Clinical and Translational Science Awards, established in 2006, supports 60 centers across the country that provide "academic homes for translational sciences and supporting research resources needed by local and national research communities." According to an article published in 2007 in Science Career Magazine, in 2007 to 2013 the European Commission targeted a majority of its €6 billion budget for health research to further translational medicine.

== Training and education ==
In recent years, a number of educational programs have emerged to provide professional training in the skills necessary for successfully translating research into improved clinical outcomes. These programs go by various names (including Master of Translational Medicine and Master of Science in Bioinnovation). Many such programs emerge from bioengineering departments, often in collaboration with clinical departments.

=== Master and PhD programs ===
The University of Edinburgh has been running an MSc in Translational Medicine program since 2007. It is a 3-year online distance learning programme aimed at the working health professional.

Aalborg University Denmark has been running a master's degree in translational medicine since 2009.

Heidelberg University has a Master Program called "Translational Medical Research" at the Medical Faculty Mannheim since 2009/2010, which can be taken by itself or as part of the Erasmus Mundus Joint Degree "International Master in Innovative Medicine".

A master's degree program in translational medicine was started at the University of Helsinki in 2010.

In 2010, UC Berkeley and UC San Francisco used a founding grant from Andy Grove to launch a joint program that became the Master of Translational Medicine (MTM). The program links the Bioengineering department at Berkeley with the Bioengineering and Therapeutic Science department at UCSF to give students a one-year experience in fostering medical innovation.

Cedars-Sinai Medical Center in Los Angeles, California was accredited in 2012 for a doctoral program in Biomedical Science and Translational Medicine. The PhD program focuses on biomedical and clinical research that relate directly to developing new therapies for patients.

For several years starting in 2013, the University of Barcelona offered a Master in Translational Medicine-MSc course from the University of Barcelona offered a course in translational medicine and a doctoral programme "Medicine and Translational Research" approved by the National Agency for the Quality Evaluation and Accreditation (ANECA).

In late 2015, the City College of New York established a master in translational medicine program. A partnership between The Grove School of Engineering and the Sophie Davis School for Biomedical Education/CUNY School of Medicine, this program provides scientists, engineers, and pre-med students with training in product design, intellectual property, regulatory affairs, and medical ethics over 3 semesters. The University of Toronto The Master of Health Science (MHSc) in Translational Research in Health Sciences is a two-year, course-based program is designed for interprofessional students from diverse backgrounds (such as medicine, life sciences, social sciences, engineering, design, and communications) who want to learn creative problem-solving skills, strategies, and competencies to translate (scientific) knowledge into innovations that improve medicine, health, and care. They have international speakers and contributors, including Dr Iseult Roche from The UK. Translational medicine is a key to the future of international health and in facilitating public health and promoting health policy to actively be implemented to establish care.

University of Liverpool, King's College London, Imperial College London, University College London, St George's, University of London, Oxford and Cambridge Universities run post-graduate courses in Translational Medicine.

The George Washington University's School of Medicine & Health Sciences offers a PhD program in Translational Health Sciences.

The University of Manchester, Newcastle University and Queen's University Belfast also offer research-focussed Masters of Research (MRes) courses in Translational Medicine.

Queen's University's School of Graduate Studies offers both an MSc and PhD program in Translational Medicine.

University of Windsor's Faculty of Graduate Studies offers a one year MSc program in Translational Health Science.

Tulane University has a PhD program in Bio-Innovation to foster design and implementation of innovative biomedical technologies.

Temple University's College of Public Health offers a Master of Science in Clinical Research and Translational Medicine. The program is jointly offered with the Lewis Katz School of Medicine.

Mahidol University at Faculty of Medicine Ramathibodi hospital has a Master and PhD programme in Translational Medicine since 2012. Mahidol University is the first University in Thailand and in Southeast Asia. The most of programme lecturers are physicians and clinicians who contribute in many fields of study such as Cancer, Allergy and Immunology, Haematology, Paediatric, Rheumatology, etc. Here, the student will be directly exposed to patients. To find out the thing in between basic science and clinical application.

University of Würzburg started a Master programme in Translational Medicine in 2018. It is aimed at medical students in the third or fourth year pursuing a career as a Clinician Scientist.

St. George's University of London offers a 1-year Translational Medicine master's programme since 2018, including pathways leading to a Master of Research (MRes), Master of Science (MSc), Postgraduate Certificate (PGCert) or Postgraduate Diploma (PGDip). Both master's degrees include a research component that makes up 33% of the MSc pathway and 58% of the MRes pathway. Taught modules are designed to cover major areas of modern translational science including drug development, genomics and development of skills related to research and data analysis.

Perdana University's Graduate School of Medicine in Kuala Lumpur, Malaysia offers a Master of Science (MSc) in Translational Medicine.

Taipei Medical University's College of Medical Science and Technology in Taipei, Taiwan offers an MSc and PhD program in Translational Science.

The University of Bern, Switzerland offers a Master in Translational Medicine and Biomedical Entrepreneurship (25)

=== Diplomas and courses ===
Academy of Translational Medicine Professionals offers a regular professional certification course "Understanding Translational Medicine Tools and Techniques".

James Lind Institute has been conducting a Postgraduate Diploma in Translational Medicine since early 2013. The program has been supported by the Universiti Sains Malaysia.

The University of Southern California School of Pharmacy offers a course in translational medicine.

== International organizations ==
=== European Society for Translational Medicine ===
The European Society for Translational Medicine is a global non-profit and neutral healthcare organization whose principal objective is to enhance world-wide healthcare by using translational medicine approaches, resources and expertise.

The society facilitates cooperation and interaction among clinicians, scientists, academia, industry, governments, funding and regulatory agencies, investors and policy makers in order to develop and deliver high-quality translational medicine programs and initiatives with overall aim to enhance the healthcare of global population. The society's goal is to enhance research and development of novel and affordable diagnostic tools and treatments for the clinical disorders affecting global population.

The society provides an annual platform in the form of global congresses where global key opinion leaders, scientists from bench side, public health professionals, clinicians from bedside and industry professionals gather and take part in the panel discussions and scientific sessions on latest updates and developments in translational medicine field including biomarkers, omics sciences, cellular and molecular biology, data mining & management, precision medicine & companion diagnostics, disease modelling, vaccines and community healthcare.

In response to the COVID-19 coronavirus pandemic, the European Society for Translational Medicine announced a global virtual congress on COVID-19 (EUSTM-2020). The Virtual Congress focused on the key principles of Translational Medicine: Bench side, Bed side and Public Health. The congress aims to address current challenges, highlight novel solutions and identify critical hurdles as they apply to COVID-19.

=== Academy of Translational Medicine Professionals ===
Academy of Translational Medicine Professionals is working to advance the ongoing knowledge and skills for clinicians and scientific professionals at all levels. Academy's high quality, standard and ethical training and educational programs ensure that all clinical and scientific professionals achieve excellence in their respective fields. Programs are accredited by the European Society for Translational Medicine.

==== Fellowship program ====
Academy of Translational Medicine Professionals offers fellowship program which is open to highly experienced professionals who have a record of significant achievements in benchside, bedside or community health fields.

== See also ==
- Implementation research
- 7th Annual Congress of the European Society for Translational Medicine on COVID-19 (EUSTM-2020)
- BMC Journal of Translational Medicine (Journal)
- American Journal of Translational Research (journal)
- Clinical and Translational Science (journal)
- Science Translational Medicine (journal)
- 6th Annual European Congress on Clinical & Translational Sciences (Event)
- 3rd Annual European Clinical Conference (Event)
- Bina Shaheen Siddiqui
