= Cranio-corpography =

- Synonyms: Craniocorpography
- Purpose: evaluates disorders of equilibrium

Cranio-Corpo-Graphy (CCG) is a medical investigation and measurement procedure developed in 1968 by German neurootologist Claus-Frenz Claussen. It documents and evaluates disorders of the equilibrium function measured by investigation procedures such as the Unterberger test, the LOLAVHESLIT test, the NEFERT test, the Romberg's test and the WOFEC test.

== Method ==
During investigation, the patient carries a worker's helmet with two lamps fixed on it on his head; two additional lamps are fixed on the patient's shoulders. An instant camera located above the patient records the patient's movements during investigation. A computer records the results and prints them into a polar coordinate system.

== History ==
After the Unterberger test, Romberg's test, and the WOFEC test were introduced, the deviations in the patient's movements were, at first, marked with chalk on the floor of the investigation room.

In 1927, Russian medician Talpis proposed a method to record the deviations using a camera and a light source. In 1960, A. Guettich introduced the light markers on a worker's helmet; evaluation of the light trace recordings, however, was aggravated by the photographic processing taking too much time. Introduction of cranio-corpo-graphy in 1968 made it possible to evaluate the recordings directly after the investigation by using an instant camera. In 1993, the method was further developed to US-CCG („Ultra-Sound Cranio-Corpo-Graphy“) by replacing the light markers through ultrasound markers.

== Use ==
Cranio-corpo-graphy is a tool within neurootological treatment and is used as an investigation procedure in working places with danger of falling hazards under the guidance of the German Accident Prevention Act G41 „Arbeiten mit Absturzgefahr“.

== Literature ==
- Online literature list of the Staatsbibliothek zu Berlin
- Claus-Frenz Claussen, J.V. DeSa: “Clinical Study of Human Equilibrium by Electronystagmography and Allied Tests.”, Popular Prakashan Bombay, Indien 1978
- Claus-Frenz Claussen, Burkard Franz: Contemporary and Practical Neurootology, Neurootologisches Forschungsinstitut der 4-G-Forschung e. V., Bad Kissingen 2006, ISBN 3-00-016398-0
