= WRI =

WRI is an initialism for:

- Worldtech Resources Institute, a business college in Camarines Sur province, Philippines
- Weingarten Realty Investors, an American real estate investment trust
- Wesley Research Institute, a medical research institute affiliated with Wesley Hospital (Brisbane), Australia
- Wolfram Research, Inc., an American software development company
- World Resources Institute, a non-profit group working for sustainable natural resource management
- War Resisters' International, an international anti-war organization
- Weber Research Institute, a research group at the Polytechnic Institute of New York University
- "WRI", designation sometimes used for a Write-in candidate
- Wire Reinforcement Institute, American trade association for wire reinforcement of concrete construction
- .WRI, file extension for a Microsoft Write file
- WRI, IATA code for McGuire Air Force Base
- Windber Research Institute, a non-profit biomedical research institute in Windber, Pennsylvania
- Wuhan Research Institute of Post & Telecommunications, a branch of Wuhan University
- Scottish Women's Rural Institutes (known as WRI or SWRI), former name of Scottish Women's Institutes
