= LOLAVHESLIT =

Medical examination procedure

- Purpose: diagnose movement disorders

LOLAVHESLIT (longitudinal, lateral, vertical head-sliding test) is a medical examination procedure developed in 1999 by German neurootologist Claus-Frenz Claussen.

The procedure serves in diagnosing diseases in relation to cervical vertebrae and the vertebral column as well as diagnosing movement disorders of the neck.

The patient performs the necessary moves in a sitting position in order to avoid unconscious body movements affecting the investigation results. Additionally, the patient stretches his arms and positions his hands between his knees for the same reasons. The head movements, which are performed during the investigation and between which the head is relocated each time into the normal position, are the following.

1. The patient stretches his head forwards.
2. The patient turns his head to the right.
3. The patient turns his head to the left.
4. The patient lays his head into the neck and looks upwards.
5. The patient bows his head forwards and looks downwards.
6. These movements are continuously repeated within a period of one minute.

The patient is assisted during the test by an examiner sitting in front of him. The test results are recorded and graphically evaluated by a computer, for example with the help of cranio-corpography.

== Literature ==
- Claus-Frenz Claussen, Burkard Franz: Contemporary and Practical Neurootology. Neurootologisches Forschungsinstitut der 4-G-Forschung e. V., Bad Kissingen 2006, ISBN 3-00-016398-0.
