= Nofret (disambiguation) =

Nofret (also Nefret, Nefert or Neferet) is an ancient Egyptian feminine given name. It may refer to:

- Nofret, ancient Egyptian princess of the 4th Dynasty
- Nofret II, ancient Egyptian queen of the 12th Dynasty
- Nofret (13th Dynasty queen)

== See also ==
- Neferet, a fictional character in the House of Night series of fantasy novels
- NEFERT (Neck Flexion Rotation Test), a medical examination procedure
