= Clinical pharmaceutical chemistry =

Clinical pharmaceutical chemistry is a specialty branch of chemical sciences, which consists of medicinal chemistry with additional training in clinical aspects of translational sciences and medicine. Typically this involves similar principal training as in general medicine, where inspection of and interaction with the patients are a vital part of the training.

Typically students in clinical pharmaceutical chemistry use the same curriculum as medical students, but specialize in medicinal and organic chemistry after and during the theoretical/early clinical studies. In clinical pharmaceutical chemistry the aim is to understand biological transformations and processes associated with chemical entities inside the human body, and how those processes can be influenced with changes in chemical structures.

The aim of clinical pharmaceutical chemistry is in addition to manage and manipulate clinical effects of different chemical structures, as well as to manage phenomena recognized in first-in-human studies. Typically clinical pharmaceutical chemistry has an important role in discovery, design and manipulation of new drug entities, and is vital especially in early clinical studies (such as Phase I studies).

== See also ==
- Medicinal chemistry
