= Bacteriologist =

Professional trained in bacteriology

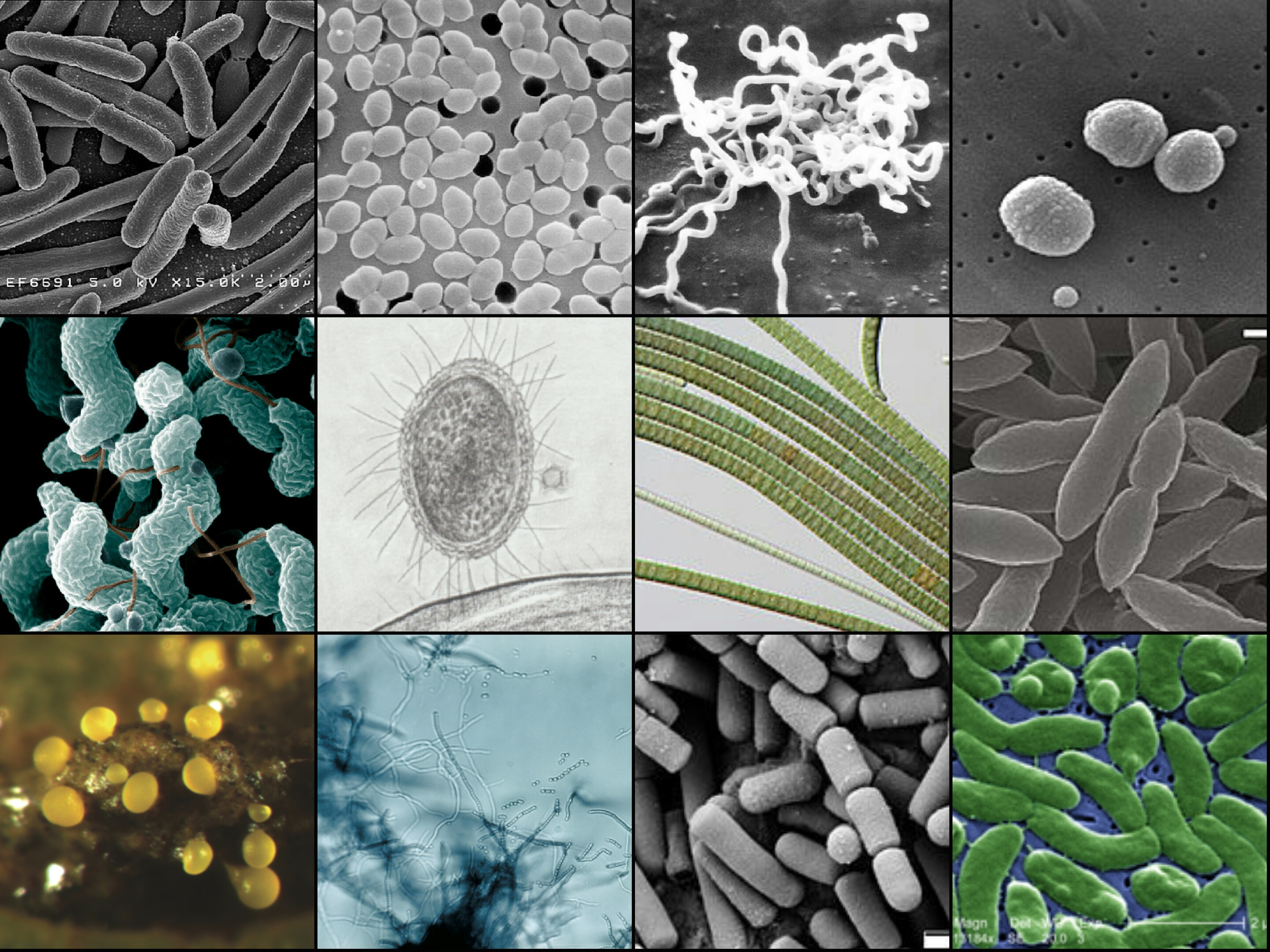
A collage of different bacteria viewed under a microscope.

A bacteriologist is a microbiologist, or similarly trained professional, in bacteriology— a subdivision of microbiology that studies bacteria, typically pathogenic ones. Bacteriologists are interested in studying and learning about bacteria, as well as using their skills in clinical settings. This includes investigating properties of bacteria such as morphology, ecology, genetics and biochemistry, phylogenetics, genomics and many other areas related to bacteria like disease diagnostic testing. Alongside human and animal healthcare providers, they may carry out various functions as medical scientists, veterinary scientists, pathologists, or diagnostic technicians in locations like clinics, blood banks, hospitals, laboratories and animal hospitals. Bacteriologists working in public health or biomedical research help develop vaccines for public use as well as public health guidelines for restaurants and businesses.

== Education ==
Because bacteriology is a sub-field of microbiology, most careers in bacteriology require an undergraduate degree in microbiology or a closely related field. Graduate degrees in microbiology or disciplines like it are common for bacteriologists because graduate degree programs provide more in-depth and specific education on topics related to bacteriology. They also often include research and lab experience. Graduate studies also provide opportunities for practical experience in applying bacteriological concepts to a work environment. If someone wants to pursue independent research, work for a company involved in bacteriology, or work in a university bacteria research facility, they will typically have to complete a PhD in bacteriology or a closely related field.

== Bacteriologist specializations ==
- Pathology
- Immunology
- Cell Biology
- Medical Laboratory Science
- Biomedical Research
- Health Technology
- Veterinary Bacteriology
- Biosecurity
- Research
- Epidemiology
- Agriculture
- Food Safety
- Bacterial Evolution and Systematics
- Phylogenetics and Taxonomy
- Ecology

== Noted bacteriologists ==
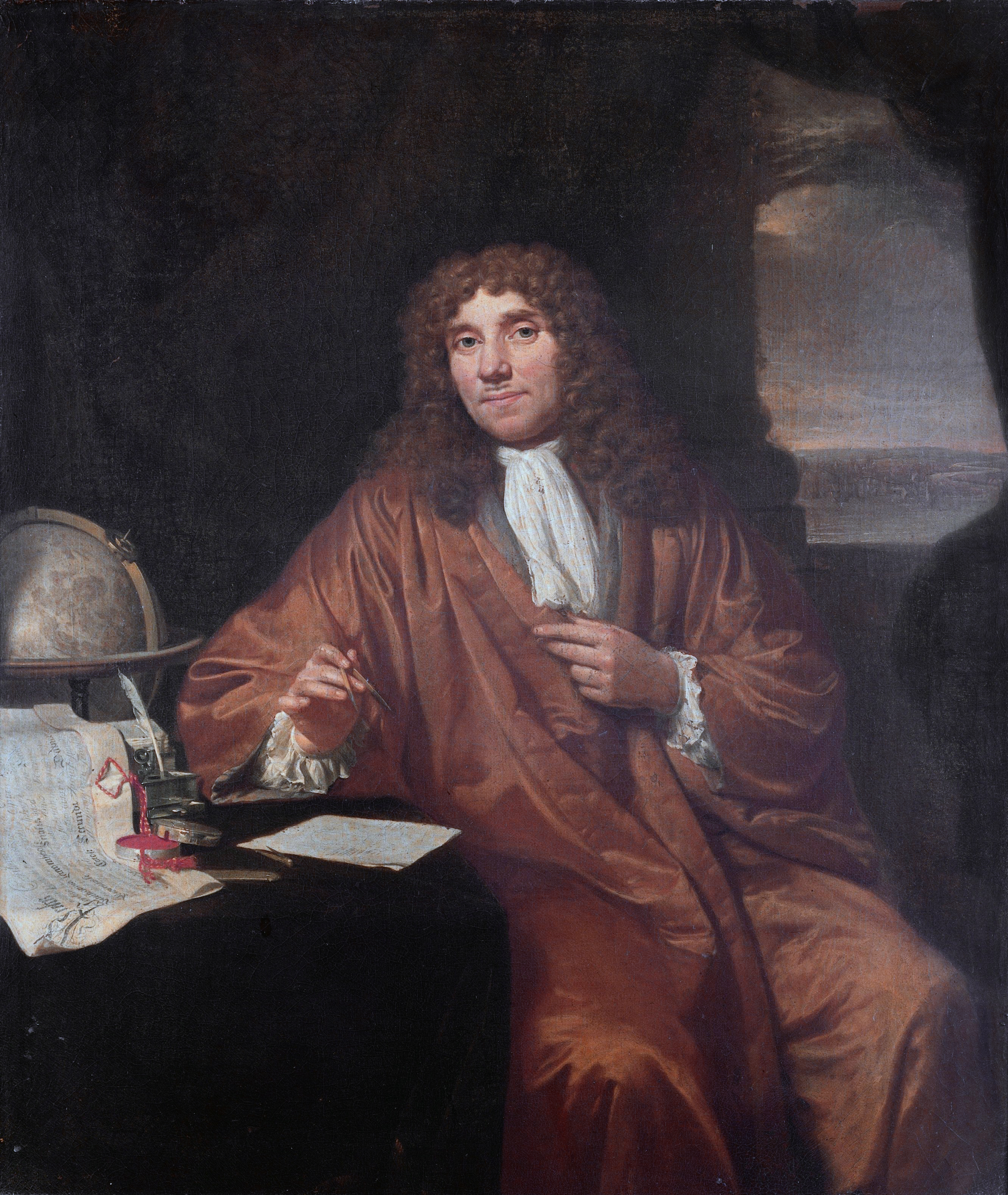
Antonie Philips van Leeuwenhoek is commonly known as "the Father of Microbiology", and is one of the first microscopists and microbiologists. He used single-lensed microscopes of his own design to observe, experiment with, and identify the first known microbes.

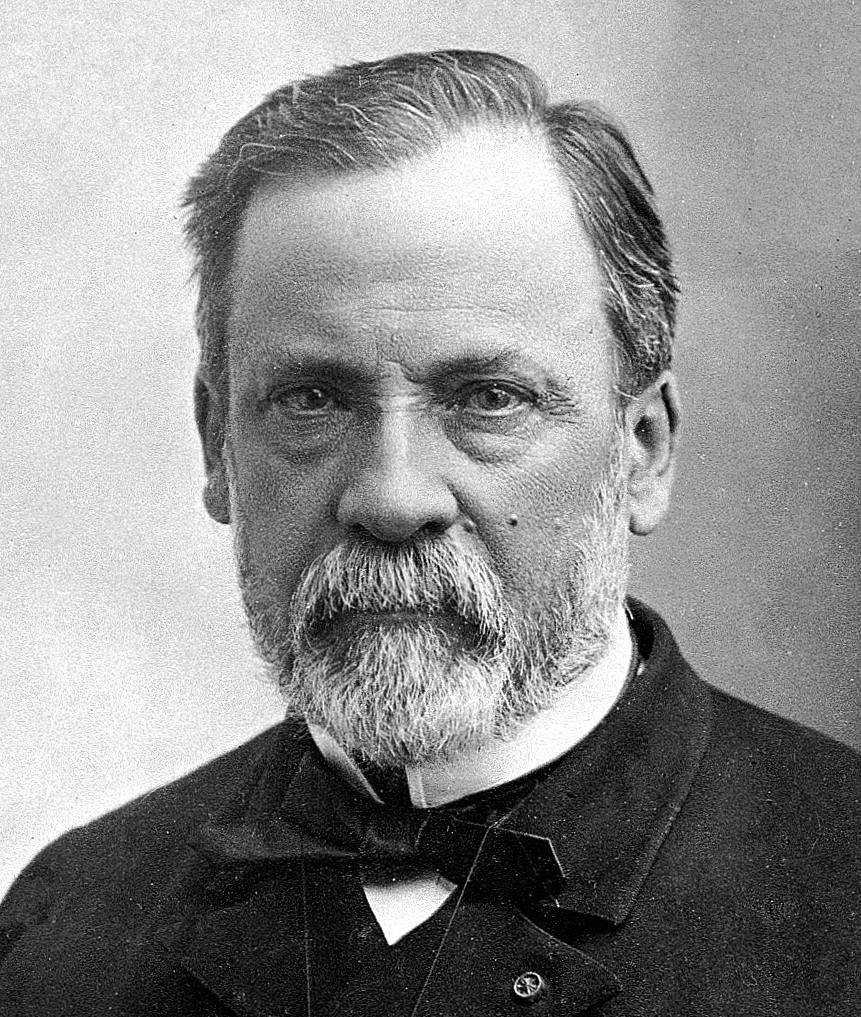
Famed French chemist and bacteriologist Louis Pasteur's first major work on bacterial disease prevention was with chicken cholera (Pasteurella multocida). This came about after he discovered chickens injected with aged chicken cholera bacteria cultures did not become ill like chickens injected with fresh cultures. This discovery later led to himself and others inventing antiseptic technique, vaccinations, and germ theory.

Sir William Watson Cheyne was a British surgeon and bacteriologist, who pioneered the use of antibacterial surgical methods in the United Kingdom.

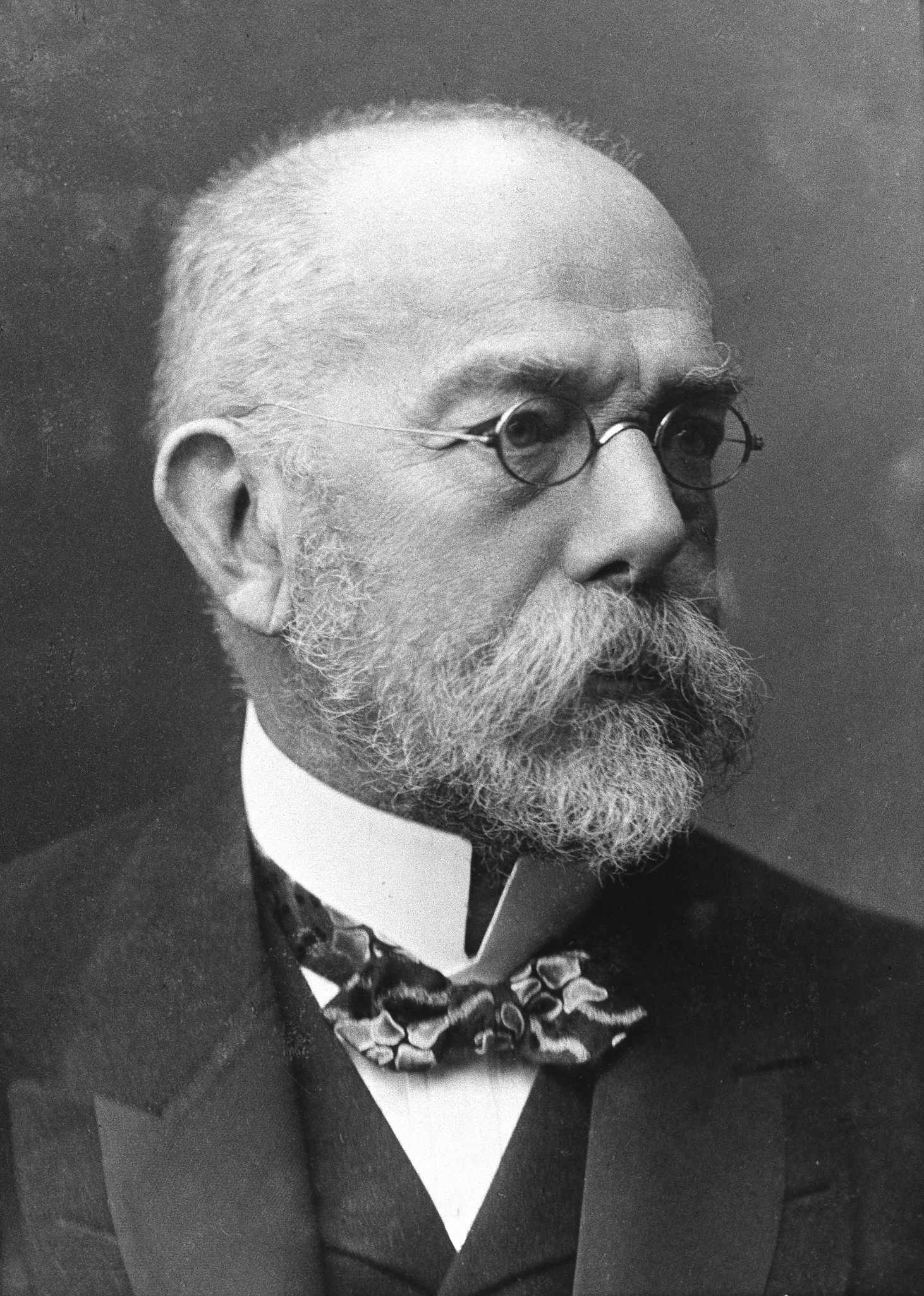
Heinrich Hermann Robert Koch was a physician and microbiologist who discovered the specific causative bacteria of deadly infectious diseases including tuberculosis, cholera, and anthrax. He is regarded as one of the main founders of modern bacteriology. He is also popularly nicknamed the 'father of microbiology" alongside Pasteur, and is also called the "father of medical bacteriology".

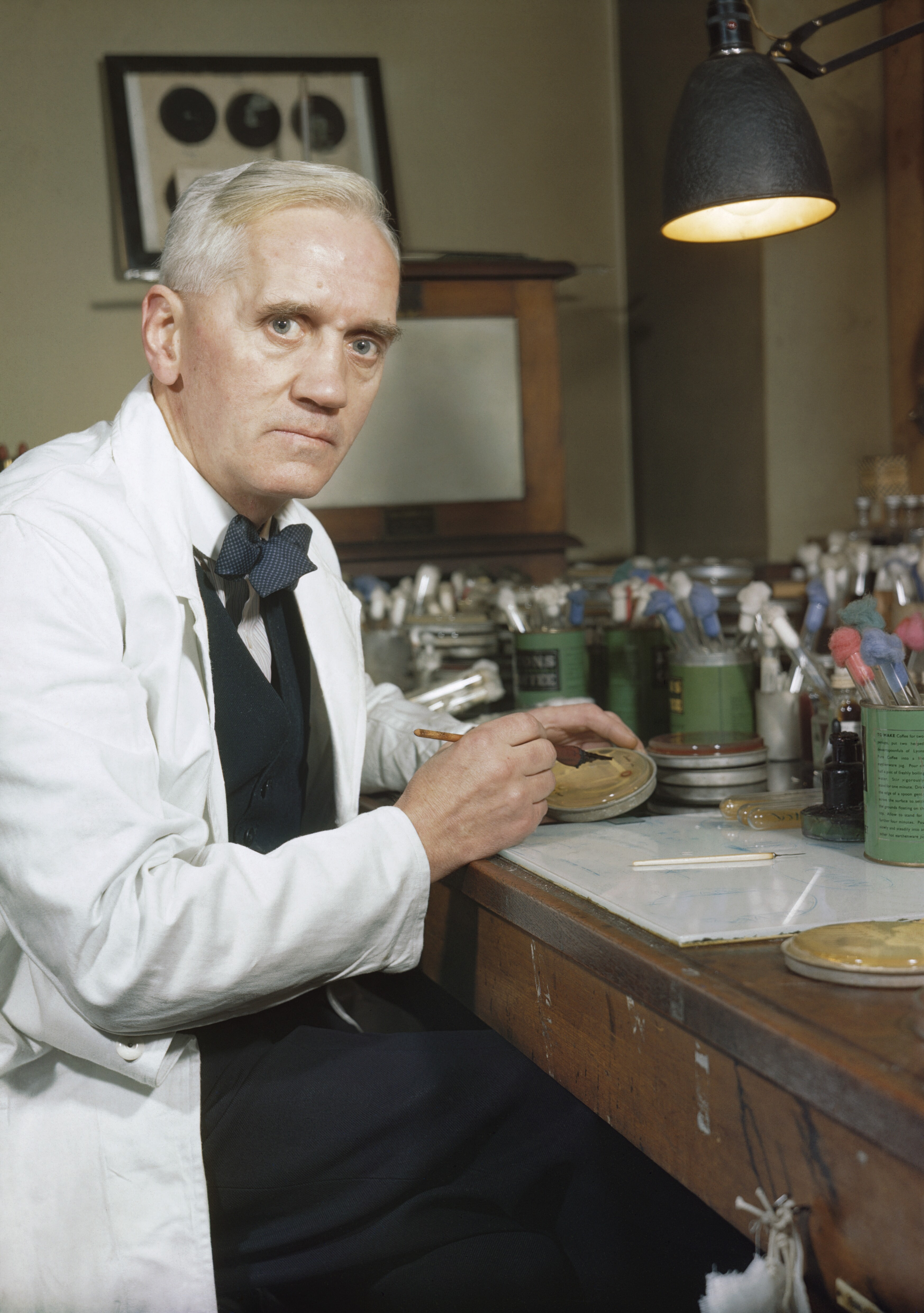
Sir Alexander Fleming, was a Scottish bacteriologist, biologist, pharmacologist and botanist. He discovered the antibacterial enzyme lysozyme in 1923. Later he isolated and studied the antibiotic substance penicillin from the mold Penicillium notatum in 1928.

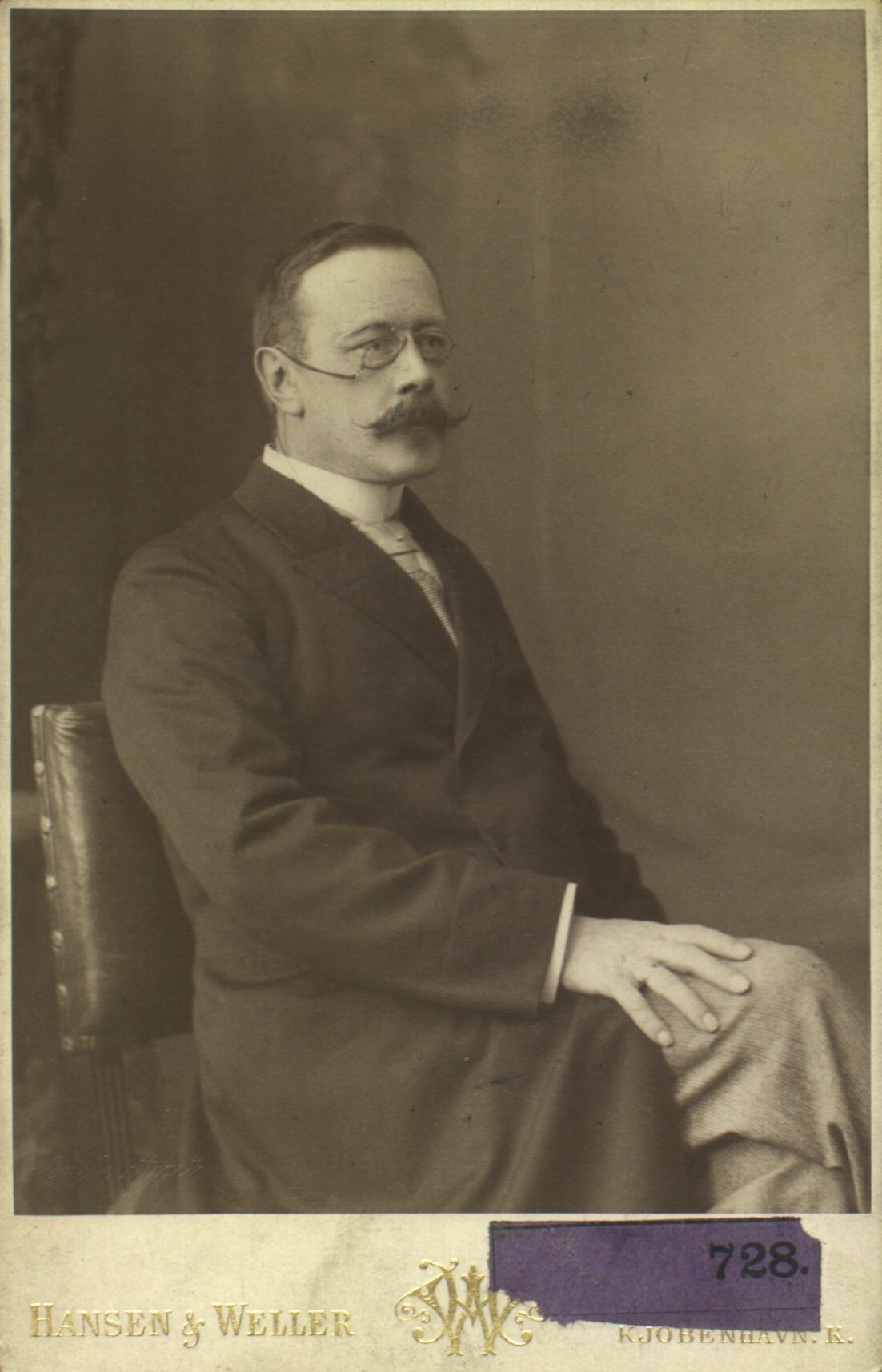
Hans Christian Joachim Gram was a Danish bacteriologist who developed the Gram stain. This stain is still a standard technique used to classify bacteria, by making them more visible under a microscope, to the present day.

== See also ==
- Bacteriology
- Microbiologist
- Bacteria
- Pathogenic Bacteria
- Human Disease
