= Translational research informatics =

Translational research informatics (TRI) is a sister domain to or a sub-domain of biomedical informatics or medical informatics concerned with the application of informatics theory and methods to translational research. There is some overlap with the related domain of clinical research informatics, but TRI is more concerned with enabling multi-disciplinary research to accelerate clinical outcomes, with clinical trials often being the natural step beyond translational research.

Translational research as defined by the National Institutes of Health includes two areas of translation. One is the process of applying discoveries generated during research in the laboratory, and in preclinical studies, to the development of trials and studies in humans. The second area of translation concerns research aimed at enhancing the adoption of best practices in the community. Cost-effectiveness of prevention and treatment strategies is also an important part of translational research.

== Overview ==
Translational research informatics can be described as "an integrated software solution to manage the: (i) logistics, (ii) data integration, and (iii) collaboration, required by translational investigators and their supporting institutions". It is the class of informatics systems that sits between and often interoperates with: (i) health information technology/electronic medical record systems, (ii) CTMS/clinical research informatics, and (iii) statistical analysis and data mining.

Translational research informatics is relatively new, with most CTSA awardee academic medical centers actively acquiring and integrating systems to enable the end-to-end TRI requirements. One advanced TRI system is being implemented at the Windber Research Institute in collaboration with GenoLogics and InforSense. Translational Research Informatics systems are expected to rapidly develop and evolve over the next couple of years.

== Systems ==
System Type	Description of System
Translational Study Management	Systems to manage investigator lead biomarker validation studies / outcomes / observational studies.
Electronic Patient Questionnaires	Web based forms for capturing participant demographic, condition, treatment, and outcomes information.
Clinical Information Management	Systems to integrate clinical annotations extracted from various sources systems, like HL7 electronic medical records, cancer registries, clinical data management systems, and clinical data warehouses.
Biorepository Management Systems	Manage biospecimens derived from study participants, operating rooms, etc.
Laboratory information management systems	Systems to manage clinical, analytical, and life sciences core technology laboratories – often conducting genomics, proteomics, metabolomics, molecular imaging, peptide synthesis, flow cytometry, etc.
Systems Biology / Science Data Management	A data base and content management system to archive raw instrument files and database science results data.
Research Collaboration System	A software solution to enable investigators and their research teams to share project information, results data, and insights.

== CTRI-dedicated wiki ==
Further discussion of this domain can be found at the Clinical Research Informatics Wiki (CRI Wiki), a wiki dedicated to issues in clinical and translational research informatics.

== See also ==
- Bioinformatics
