= American Journal of Cancer Research =

- Discipline: Oncology
- Language: English
- Edited by: Mien-Chie Hung

Publication details
- History: 2011-present
- Publisher: e-Century Publishing Corporation
- Impact factor: 6.166 (2021)

Standard abbreviations
- ISO 4: Am. J. Cancer Res.

Indexing
- ISSN: 2156-6976
- OCLC no.: 652560548

Links
- Journal homepage

The American Journal of Cancer Research is a medical journal established in 2011. It covers all areas of clinical oncology and experimental cancer research and publishes review articles, original articles, and editorials. It is published by e-Century Publishing Corporation. The editor-in-chief is Dr. Mien-Chie Hung. The journal is abstracted and indexed in the Science Citation Index Expanded. According to the Journal Citation Reports, the journal has a 2021 impact factor of 6.166.
