= Translational Research (journal) =

- Discipline: Translational research
- Language: English
- Edited by: Jeffrey Laurence

Publication details
- Former names: The Journal of Laboratory and Clinical Medicine
- History: 1915-present
- Publisher: Mosby
- Frequency: Monthly
- Impact factor: 7.012 (2020)

Standard abbreviations
- ISO 4: Transl. Res.

Indexing
- CODEN: JLCMAK
- ISSN: 1931-5244 (print); 1878-1810 (web)
- LCCN: 2006212275
- OCLC no.: 66901338

Links
- Journal homepage; Online access; Online archive; Journal page on publisher's website

Translational Research: The Journal of Laboratory and Clinical Medicine is a monthly peer-reviewed medical journal covering translational research. It was established in 1915 as The Journal of Laboratory and Clinical Medicine obtaining its current title in 2006. Jeffrey Laurence (Weill Cornell Medical College) has been editor-in-chief since 2006. He was preceded by Dale Hammerschmidt. It is the official journal of the Central Society for Clinical and Translational Research. It is published by Mosby.

== Abstracting and indexing ==
The journal is abstracted and indexed in:

- Academic OneFile
- BIOSIS Previews
- CAB Abstracts
- CINAHL
- Current Contents/Clinical Medicine
- Current Contents/Life Sciences
- Elsevier BIOBASE
- Embase
- GeoRef
- Global Health
- Index Medicus/MEDLINE/PubMed
- Science Citation Index
- Scopus
- Tropical Diseases Bulletin

According to the Journal Citation Reports, the journal has a 2014 impact factor of 5.03, ranking it second out of 30 journals in the category "Medical Laboratory Technology", 17th out of 153 journals in the category "Medicine, General & Internal" and 17th out of 123 journals in the category "Medicine, Research & Experimental"
