= Neurootological and Equilibriometric Society =

German academic organization

The Neurootological and Equilibriometric Society is a learned society that was founded in 1974 and has its seat in Bad Kissingen (Germany).

== Foundation ==
The society was founded on May 25, 1974, by an assembly of physicians, medical technologists, and engineers interested in neurootology. Since then, the president has been Claus-Frenz Claussen (University of Wurzburg). From the beginning, multilingual communication was established to facilitate the exchange of views as much as possible. English, French, German, and Spanish were listed in the statutes as official languages.

== Aims ==
The association's aim has been to foster clinical neurootology in terms of practice and research, by means of

- Training in preparing and undertaking neurootological diagnosis with special regard to equilibrioception
- Standardization of clinical methods of diagnosis and technical devices
- The publication of a medical journal.

=== Goals ===
Among the goals of the society are not only the evaluation of basic and clinical research but also the promotion of clinical neurootology including its four main fields equilibriometry, audiometry, olfactometry, and gustometry, as well as the training of interested doctors and medical assistance personnel.

=== Training ===
Since its foundation, the society has held annual congresses for further training, alternately in Bad Kissingen and other countries.

=== Publications ===
The Neurootology Newsletter as well as the proceedings of the society are used to exchange scientific knowledge within the association. In addition, the society publishes the International Tinnitus Journal.

=== Honours ===
Since 1980, the association has honoured experienced neurootologists who have made an essential contribution to neurootology in research and clinical practice. The scientists who are to be honoured are determined two years in advance by the Members' Assembly during the congresses taking place in Bad Kissingen.
