= E-Century Publishing Corporation =

American publisher

e-Century Publishing Corporation is a publisher of seventeen open access scientific journals based in Madison, Wisconsin. 11 of them are indexed in the Web of Science, including the American Journal of Translational Research, the American Journal of Cancer Research, the International Journal of Clinical and Experimental Medicine, and the International Journal of Clinical and Experimental Pathology. The publisher was included on Beall's list before it was taken down in 2017.

One of its journals — the American Journal of Nuclear Medicine and Molecular Imaging — was targeted in the Who's Afraid of Peer Review? sting operation and rejected the fake paper.
