= NEFERT =

- Purpose: evaluates intracorporal movement

The Neck Flexion Rotation Test (NEFERT) is a medical examination procedure developed in 1999 by German neurootologist Claus-Frenz Claussen.

== Use ==
The procedure serves for investigating intracorporal movement differences between head and body, especially at the atlanto-axial joint and the lower cervical spine column. The method can help diagnosing sprains of the neck, stiff necks, and whiplash. According to the National Center for Biotechnology Information within the National Institutes of Health, the procedure is "commonly used in clinical practice to evaluate patients with cervicogenic headache."

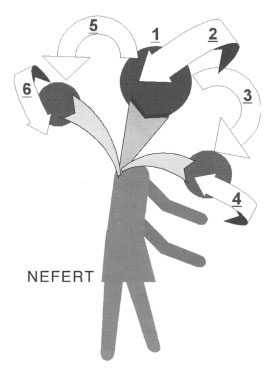
NEFERT

== Method ==
The test consists of six movements, which can also be distinguished into four phases. The movements are performed by the patient in a standing position.

1. (Phase I) The patient turns their head several times maximally within a period of 20 seconds.
2. (Phase II) The patient bows their head forward maximally.
3. In a bowed position, the patient turns their head maximally from the left to the right and from the right to the left within a period of 20 seconds.
4. (Phase III) The patient bows their head backwards maximally.
5. In a position bowed backwards, the patient turns their head several times maximally from the left to the right and from the right to the left within a period of 20 seconds.
6. (Phase IV) After a total time period of 60 seconds, the patient returns into a straight position.

If the test results are interfered by unconscious shoulder movements of the patient, a second test course is performed, during which the examining person holds the patient's shoulders with their hands. The test results are recorded and graphically evaluated by a computer, for example with the help of Cranio-corpography.

== Literature ==
- Claus-Frenz Claussen, Burkard Franz: Contemporary and Practical Neurootology, Neurootologisches Forschungsinstitut der 4-G-Forschung e. V., Bad Kissingen 2006, ISBN 3-00-016398-0
