= Allied Academies =

Predatory academic publisher

- Status: Active
- Founded: 1995
- Founder: Jim Carland; JoAnn Carland
- Country of origin: United States
- Headquarters location: North Carolina
- Distribution: Worldwide
- Publication types: Scientific journals
- Official website: www.alliedacademies.org

Allied Academies (also known as Allied Business Academies) is a reportedly fraudulent corporation chartered under the laws of North Carolina. Its postal address is in London, United Kingdom. It presents itself as an association of scholars, with supporting and encouraging research and the sharing and exchange of knowledge as its stated aims. The organization consists of 30 affiliate academies, which provide awards to academics and publish academic journals both online and in hard copy for members. Since 2015 the organization has been listed on Jeffrey Beall's list of "potential, possible, or probable predatory scholarly open-access publishers". It is in a partnership with OMICS Publishing Group which uses its website and logo. In 2018, OMICS owner Srinubabu Gedela declared that he had informed the Nevada court that Allied Academies was a subsidiary of OMICS International. During a conference in 2018, they falsely listed a prominent chemist among its organizing committee who had not agreed to this and was not affiliated with Allied Academies.

== List of journals ==
Published under Allied Academies

- Addiction & Criminology
- Advances in Cell Science and Tissue Culture
- Allied Journal of Clinical Pathology Research
- Allied Journal of Environmental Earth Sciences
- Allied Journal of Medical Research
- Annals of Cardiovascular and Thoracic Surgery
- Archives in Food and Nutrition
- Archives of Digestive Disorders
- Archives of General Internal Medicine
- Archives of Industrial Biotechnology
- Asian Journal of Biomedical and Pharmaceutical Sciences
- Biology & Medicine Case Reports
- Biomedical Research
- Case Reports in Surgery and Invasive Procedures
- Cognitive Neuroscience Journal
- Current Pediatric Research
- Current Trends in Cardiology
- Environmental Risk Assessment and Remediation
- Gynecology and Reproductive Endocrinology
- Hematology and Blood Disorders
- Immune System and Disorders Journal
- Immunology Case Reports
- Insights in Nutrition and Metabolism
- Integrative Journal of Bone and Cartilage
- Integrative Neuroscience Research
- International Journal of Pure and Applied Zoology
- International Journal of Respiratory Medicine
- International Tinnitus Journal
- Journal Clinical Psychiatry and Cognitive Psychology
- Journal of Advanced Surgical Research
- Journal of Aging and Geriatric Psychiatry
- Journal of Agricultural Science and Botany
- Journal of Anesthetics and Anesthesiology
- Journal of Applied Mathematics and Statistical Applications
- Journal of Bacteriology and Infectious Diseases
- Journal of Biochemistry and Biotechnology
- Journal of Biomedical Imaging and Bioengineering
- Journal of Biotechnology and Phytochemistry
- Journal of Brain and Neurology
- Journal of Cancer Clinical Research
- Journal of Cancer Immunology & Therapy
- Journal of Cardiovascular Medicine and Therapeutics
- Journal of Cell Biology and Metabolism
- Journal of Cell Science and Mutation
- Journal of Chemical Technology and Applications
- Journal of Child and Adolescent Health
- Journal of Cholesterol and Heart Disease
- Journal of Clinical Dentistry and Oral Health
- Journal of Clinical Endocrinology Research
- Journal of Clinical Immunology Research
- Journal of Clinical Nephrology and Therapeutics
- Journal of Clinical Oncology and Cancer Research
- Journal of Clinical Ophthalmology
- Journal of Clinical Pathology and Laboratory Medicine
- Journal of Clinical Research and Pharmacy
- Journal of Clinical Respiratory Medicine
- Journal of Clinical and Bioanalytical Chemistry
- Journal of Clinical and Experimental Neurology
- Journal of Clinical and Experimental Toxicology
- Journal of Clinical and Experimental Traumatology
- Journal of Dermatology Research and Skin Care
- Journal of Diabetology (not to be confused with Journal of Diabetology published by Medknow Publications)
- Journal of Environmental Waste Management and Recycling
- Journal of Finance and Marketing
- Journal of Fisheries Research
- Journal of Food Microbiology
- Journal of Food Nutrition and Health
- Journal of Food Science and Nutrition
- Journal of Food Technology and Preservation
- Journal of Gastroenterology and Digestive Diseases
- Journal of Genetics and Molecular Biology
- Journal of Histology and Cell Biology
- Journal of Hypertension and Heart Care
- Journal of Industrial and Environmental Chemistry
- Journal of Infectious Diseases and Medical Microbiology
- Journal of Intensive and Critical Care Nursing
- Journal of Invasive and Non-Invasive Cardiology
- Journal of Juvenile Psychology and Behavioural Sciences
- Journal of Medical Oncology and Therapeutics
- Journal of Mental Health and Aging
- Journal of Molecular Medicine and Therapy
- Journal of Molecular Oncology Research
- Journal of Neuroinformatics and Neuroimaging
- Journal of Neurology and Neurorehabilitation Research
- Journal of Nutrition and Human Health
- Journal of Oral Medicine and Surgery
- Journal of Orthopedic Surgery and Rehabilitation
- Journal of Pain Management and Therapy
- Journal of Parasitic Diseases: Diagnosis and Therapy
- Journal of Pathology and Disease Biology
- Journal of Pharmaceutical Chemistry & Chemical Science
- Journal of Pharmacology and Therapeutic Research
- Journal of Physical Therapy and Sports Medicine
- Journal of Plant Biotechnology and Microbiology
- Journal of Plant Diseases & Biomarkers
- Journal of Pregnancy and Neonatal Medicine
- Journal of Primary Care and General Practice
- Journal of Psychology and Cognition
- Journal of Public Health Policy and Planning
- Journal of Public Health and Nutrition
- Journal of Pulmonology and Clinical Research
- Journal of RNA and Genomics
- Journal of Systems Biology & Proteome Research
- Journal of Translational Research
- Journal of Trauma and Critical Care
- Journal of Veterinary Medicine and Allied Science
- Materials Science and Nanotechnology
- Microbiology: Current Research
- Neurophysiology Research
- Ophthalmology Case Reports
- Otolaryngology Online Journal
- Reports on Oral Diseases
- Research Journal of Allergy and Immunology
- Research and Reports on Data Science
- Research and Reports in Gynecology and Obstetrics
- Research and Reports in Immunology
- Research and Reports in Pulmonology
- Research and Reports on Genetics
- Research in Clinical Dermatology
- Sensory Research: Neuroscience and Modelling
- Timely Topics in Clinical Immunology
- Trends in Colorectal Disease and Surgery
- Virology Research Journal

Published under Allied Business Academies

- Academy of Accounting and Financial Studies Journal
- Academy of Educational Leadership Journal
- Academy of Entrepreneurship Journal
- Academy of Marketing Studies Journal
- Academy of Strategic Management Journal
- Business Studies Journal
- International Journal of Entrepreneurship
- Journal of Economics and Economic Education Research
- Journal of Entrepreneurship Education
- Journal of International Business Research
- Journal of Legal, Ethical and Regulatory Issues
- Journal of Management Information and Decision Sciences
- Journal of Organizational Culture, Communications and Conflict
- Journal of the International Academy for Case Studies
