= Academy of Entrepreneurship Journal =

- Discipline: management and entrepreneurship, start-up, Consumer behaviour and e-commerce
- Language: English
- Edited by: Sony Emeka Ali, Harmon Chaniago, and Muhammad Arsalan Nazir

Publication details
- History: 1995–present
- Publisher: Allied Business Academies
- Frequency: Bi-monthly

Standard abbreviations
- ISO 4: Acad. Entrep. J.

Indexing
- ISSN: 1087-9595 (print); 1528-2686 (web)
- OCLC no.: 777554581

Links
- Journal homepage; current issue; Online archive

Academy of Entrepreneurship Journal is a bi-monthly peer-reviewed academic journal of Academy of Entrepreneurship that covers the fields of management and entrepreneurship, business model evolution, Family business, start-up, Customer relationship management, Consumer behaviour and e-commerce.

Its editors-in-chief are Sony Emeka Ali, Harmon Chaniago, and Muhammad Arsalan Nazir. It was established in 2015 and is published by Allied Business Academies, which is affiliated with the predatory OMICS Publishing Group.

== Abstracting and indexing ==
The journal is abstracted and indexed in Scopus, DOAJ, and ABI/Inform.
