= International Tinnitus Journal =

- Discipline: Audiology
- Language: English

Publication details
- History: 1995–present
- Publisher: Association of Otorhinolaryngology of the Federal District
- Frequency: Biannually

Standard abbreviations
- ISO 4: Int. Tinnitus J.

Indexing
- ISSN: 0946-5448

Links
- Journal homepage

The International Tinnitus Journal is a peer-reviewed medical journal that was established in 1995. It covers all aspects of tinnitus. Until 2010, the journal was published by the Martha Entenmann Tinnitus Research Center (State University of New York) in cooperation with the Neurootologisches Forschungsinstitut der 4-G-Forschung e.V. (Bad Kissingen, Germany), and edited by Claus-Frenz Claussen, Abraham Shulman, Barbara Goldstein, and Michael Seidman. It is published biannually and is the official journal of the Neurootological and Equilibriometric Society. The journal is abstracted and indexed in Index Medicus/MEDLINE, PubMed, EMBASE/Excerpta Medica, and Chemical Abstracts.

In 2010, the Association of Otorhinolaryngology of the Federal District (Brasília, Brazil) became the new owner of the International Tinnitus Journal and Carlos A. Oliveira (University of Brasília) took over as editor-in-chief. As of 2021, the journal is also listed as being published by Allied Academies, predatory publisher and an OMICS Publishing Group affiliate.
