= International Journal of Clinical and Experimental Pathology =

- Discipline: Pathology
- Language: English
- Edited by: Dennis W. Dickson and Xiuwu Bian

Publication details
- History: 2008–present
- Publisher: e-Century Publishing Corporation
- Open access: Yes
- Impact factor: 1.706 (2016)

Standard abbreviations
- ISO 4: Int. J. Clin. Exp. Pathol.

Indexing
- ISSN: 1936-2625

Links
- Journal homepage

The International Journal of Clinical and Experimental Pathology is an open access medical journal established in 2008. It covers all aspects of experimental and clinical pathology and publishes review articles, original research articles, case reports, and editorials. It is published by e-Century Publishing Corporation. The co-editors-in-chief are Dennis W. Dickson, Mayo Clinic in Florida and Xiuwu Bian, Third Military Medical University, Chongqing, China. The journal is abstracted and indexed in Chemical Abstracts, Scopus, BIOSIS Previews, PubMed and the Science Citation Index Expanded. According to the Journal Citation Reports, the journal has a 2016 impact factor of 1.706.
