= Academy of Strategic Management Journal =

- Discipline: Management, organization studies, business and trade and marketing
- Language: English
- Edited by: Shawn Carraher (University of Texas at Dallas)

Publication details
- History: 2002–present
- Publisher: Allied Business Academies
- Frequency: Bi-monthly

Standard abbreviations
- ISO 4: Acad. Strateg. Manag. J.

Indexing
- ISSN: 1544-1458 (print); 1939-6104 (web)
- OCLC no.: 705644047

Links
- Journal homepage; Online access; Online archive

Academy of Strategic Management Journal is a bi-monthly peer-reviewed academic journal that covers the fields of management and organization studies, business, trade and marketing. Its editors-in-chief are Shawn Carraher (University of Texas at Dallas), Sang-Bing Tsai (Civil Aviation University of China). It was established in 2002 and is published by Allied Business Academies, which is affiliated with the predatory OMICS Publishing Group.

== Abstracting and indexing ==
The journal is abstracted and indexed in Scopus, DOAJ, and ABI/Inform.
