= International Journal of Clinical and Experimental Medicine =

- Discipline: General medicine
- Language: English
- Edited by: Jin-Xiong She

Publication details
- History: 2008–present
- Publisher: e-Century Publishing Corporation
- Open access: Yes

Standard abbreviations
- ISO 4: Int. J. Clin. Exp. Med.

Indexing
- ISSN: 1940-5901

Links
- Journal homepage

The International Journal of Clinical and Experimental Medicine is an open access medical journal established in 2008. It covers all areas of experimental and clinical medicine and publishes review articles, original articles, case reports, and editorials. It is published by e-Century Publishing Corporation. The editor-in-chief is Jin-Xiong She (Medical College of Georgia). The journal is abstracted and indexed in Scopus, BIOSIS Previews, and the Science Citation Index Expanded. According to the Journal Citation Reports, the journal has a 2016 impact factor of 1.069.
