= Clinical and Translational Science =

- Discipline: Translational medicine
- Language: English
- Edited by: John A. Wagner

Publication details
- History: 2008-present
- Publisher: Wiley-Blackwell
- Frequency: Bimonthly
- Open access: Yes
- License: Creative Commons Attribution-Noncommercial-No Derivative Works 3.0 Unported
- Impact factor: 3.1 (2023)

Standard abbreviations
- ISO 4: Clin. Transl. Sci.

Indexing
- CODEN: CTSLCA
- ISSN: 1752-8054 (print); 1752-8062 (web)
- LCCN: 2008247775
- OCLC no.: 828138762

Links
- Journal homepage; Online access; Online archive

Clinical and Translational Science is a bimonthly peer-reviewed open-access medical journal covering translational medicine. It is published by Wiley-Blackwell and is an official journal of the American Society for Clinical Pharmacology and Therapeutics. The journal was established in 2008 and the editor-in-chief is John A. Wagner (Cygnal Therapeutics).

== Abstracting and indexing ==
The journal is abstracted and indexed in:

- Biological Abstracts
- BIOSIS Previews
- EBSCO databases
- Embase
- Index Medicus/MEDLINE/PubMed
- ProQuest databases
- Science Citation Index Expanded
- Scopus

According to the Journal Citation Reports, its 2023 impact factor is 3.1.
