= American Journal of Translational Research =

- Discipline: Medicine
- Language: English
- Edited by: Wen-Hwa Lee

Publication details
- History: 2009–present
- Publisher: e-Century Publishing Corporation
- Frequency: Quarterly
- Open access: Yes
- Impact factor: 4.060 (2021)

Standard abbreviations
- ISO 4: Am. J. Transl. Res.

Indexing
- CODEN: AJTRA7
- ISSN: 1943-8141
- LCCN: 2008203923
- OCLC no.: 261213850

Links
- Journal homepage; Online access; Online archive; PubMed Central archive

The American Journal of Translational Research is an open-access medical journal published by e-Century Publishing Corporation. The journal covers translational research of medical science and the relevant biomedical research areas. It was established in 2009. The editor-in-chief is Wen-Hwa Lee (University of California, Irvine). The journal's main focus is original clinical and experimental research articles, but it also publishes review articles, editorials, hypotheses, letters to the editor, and meeting reports.

== Abstracting and indexing ==
The journal is abstracted and indexed in:

- BIOSIS Previews
- Chemical Abstracts
- Embase
- Scopus
- Science Citation Index Expanded

According to Journal Citation Reports, the journal has a 2021 impact factor of 4.060
