= Unterberger test =

Test used in otolaryngology

- Synonyms: Unterberger's test and Unterberger's stepping test
- Purpose: assess vestibular pathology

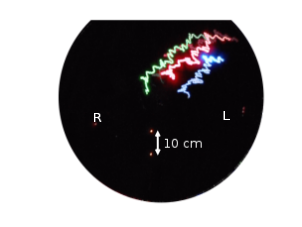
Unterberger test: Video documentation with image overlay

The Unterberger test, also Unterberger's test and Unterberger's stepping test, is a test used in otolaryngology to help assess whether a patient has a vestibular pathology. It is not useful for detecting central (brain) disorders of balance.

== Technique ==
The patient is asked to walk in place with their eyes closed.

=== Interpretation ===
If the patient rotates to one side they may have a labyrinthine lesion on that side, but this test should not be used to diagnose lesions without the support of other tests.
