= Claus-Frenz Claussen =

German professor, artist and writer (1939–2022)

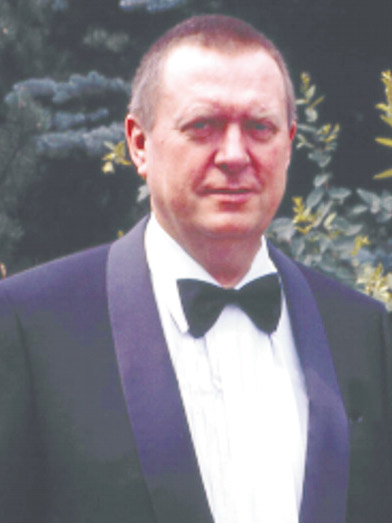
- Prof. Claus Claussen
- Born: 28 May 1939; Husum, Nordfriesland, Schleswig-Holstein
- Died: 4 September 2022 (aged 83)
- Other name: Claußen
- Known for: Neurotology

Claus-Frenz Claussen, (originally: Claußen) (28 May 1939 – 4 September 2022) was a German ENT-Medician and University teacher, author, editor, artist and inventor. He was the first university teacher for neurotology to be appointed in Germany.

== Life ==
Claussen studied medicine at the universities of Bonn and Hamburg, where he took his German medical state exam and the United States Medical Licensing Examination. In 1965, he obtained a doctorate degree with a dissertation, "a comparison of the enteral absorption of Digoxine and digostine esters".

During his academic years, he attended courses at the universities of Toulouse (France), Oxford (England), Oslo (Norway), Gothenburg (Sweden), Copenhagen and Århus (Denmark), as a scholarship holder of the Studienstiftung des deutschen Volkes.

Between 1965 and 1967, Claussen was an intern at Hamburg and Simmerath (Eifel). From 1967 to 1970, he was assistant lecturer at the University ENT clinic of the University of Berlin. From 1968 to 1969, he completed research visits in the then newly created field of neurotology at Nils Gunnar Henriksson (1920–1999) in Lund (Sweden), and developed numerous neurotological tests such as cranio-corpography.

In 1970, he qualified as a professor at the FU Berlin to be the first university teacher for neurotology (the study of the functioning and disordered functions of the cranial senses) in Germany. His postdoctoral thesis was about the recording and evaluation of selected quantitative equilibrium function tests ("Über die Aufzeichnung und Auswertung ausgewählter quantitativer Gleichgewichtsfunktionsprüfungen“). In 1969 he started developing corresponding departments at the university clinics of Berlin and Würzburg. Since 1971, he has been head of this department in the ENT Clinic in the University of Würzburg, where he qualified as a professor of neurotology in 1971.

From 1972 to 1974, he conducted research in Buenos Aires (Argentina), under the tutorship of Juan Manuel Tato (1902–2004). He also published his first textbook, his own concept of modern equilibriometry, the objective and quantitative measuring of the equilibrium function. Additionally, he completed several research visits to the NASA laboratories headed by Ashton Graybiel in Pensacola, Florida.

Claussen was professor and, since 1978, associate professor for neurotology at the ENT clinic of the University of Würzburg until his Emeritus after the end of the summer semester 2004. He investigated the regulation of the equilibrium, the sensory functions of the hearing organs, as well as smell and taste perception.

== Work ==
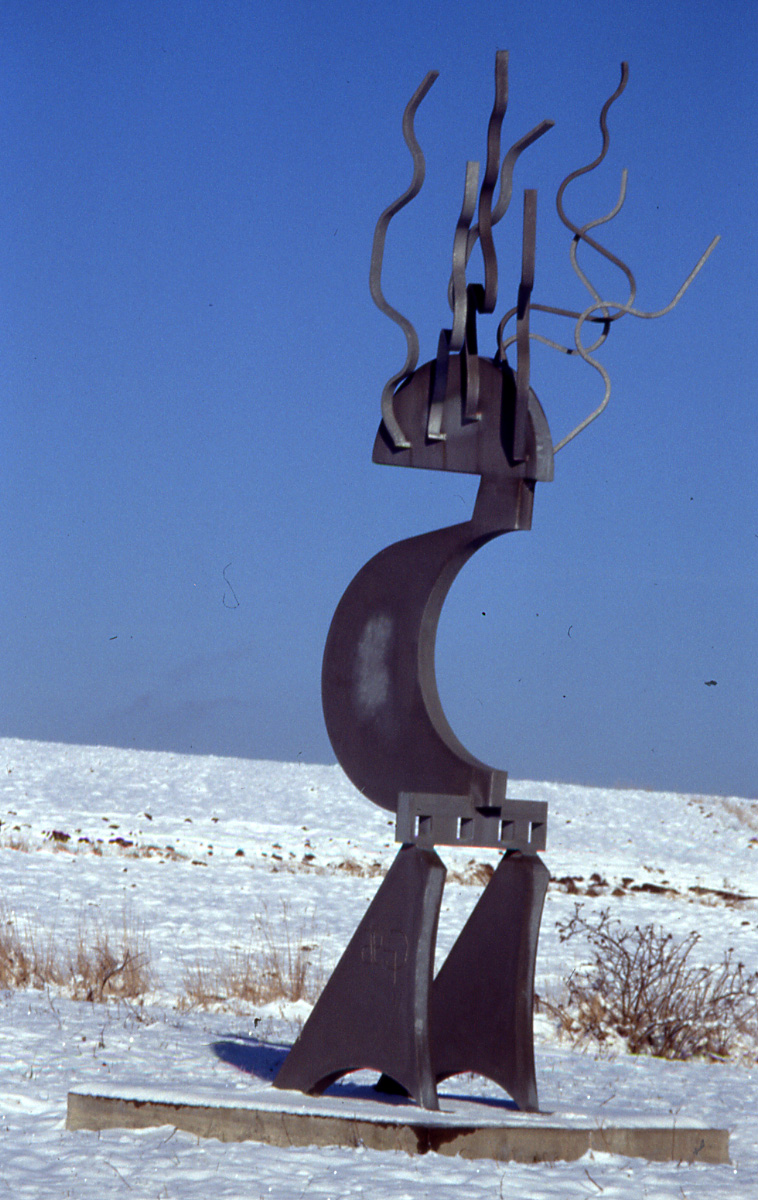
Claussen's Steel sculpture Cerebralo in the Fine Art Park at Eisenbühl

Between 1967 and 1982, Claussen established a database including data of about 30,000 neurotological patients in Würzburg. Analysis of the data made it possible to draw conclusions about diseases such as vertigo and double vision, and hearing disorders or tinnitus. In 1972, Claussen began scientific cooperation with scientists and institutions around the world.

In 1974, he co-founded the international Neurootological and Equilibriometric Society (NES) in Bad Kissingen and, in 1981, the "Research Society for Smell, Taste, Hearing and Equilibrium Disorders at Bad Kissingen" (4-GF e.V), of which he remained president. Also after his Emeritus, he still held numerous honorary posts as a president or chairman of international medical organizations.

Claussen has organized and conducted a lot of international congresses, which often take place in his home town of Bad Kissingen, about neurotology and disorders of the cranial senses as well as their therapy. So, he has, since 1974, organized the annual "International Congress of Neurotologists", which is attended by participants from 33 countries.

== Memberships ==
Claussen was member, corresponding member and honorary member in numerous scientific societies and associations in Europe, America and Asia, for example in

- Bárány-Gesellschaft, Uppsala, Sweden
- Aerospace Medical Society, Washington, D.C., USA
- Gesellschaft Deutscher Naturforscher und Ärzte (GDNÄ)
- Deutsche Gesellschaft für Gerontologie und Geriatrie (DGGG)
- Deutsche Gesellschaft für Hals-Nasen-Ohrenheilkunde, Kopf- und Hals-Chirurgie
- Committee of representatives des Automobilclub von Deutschland (AvD)

== Honours ==
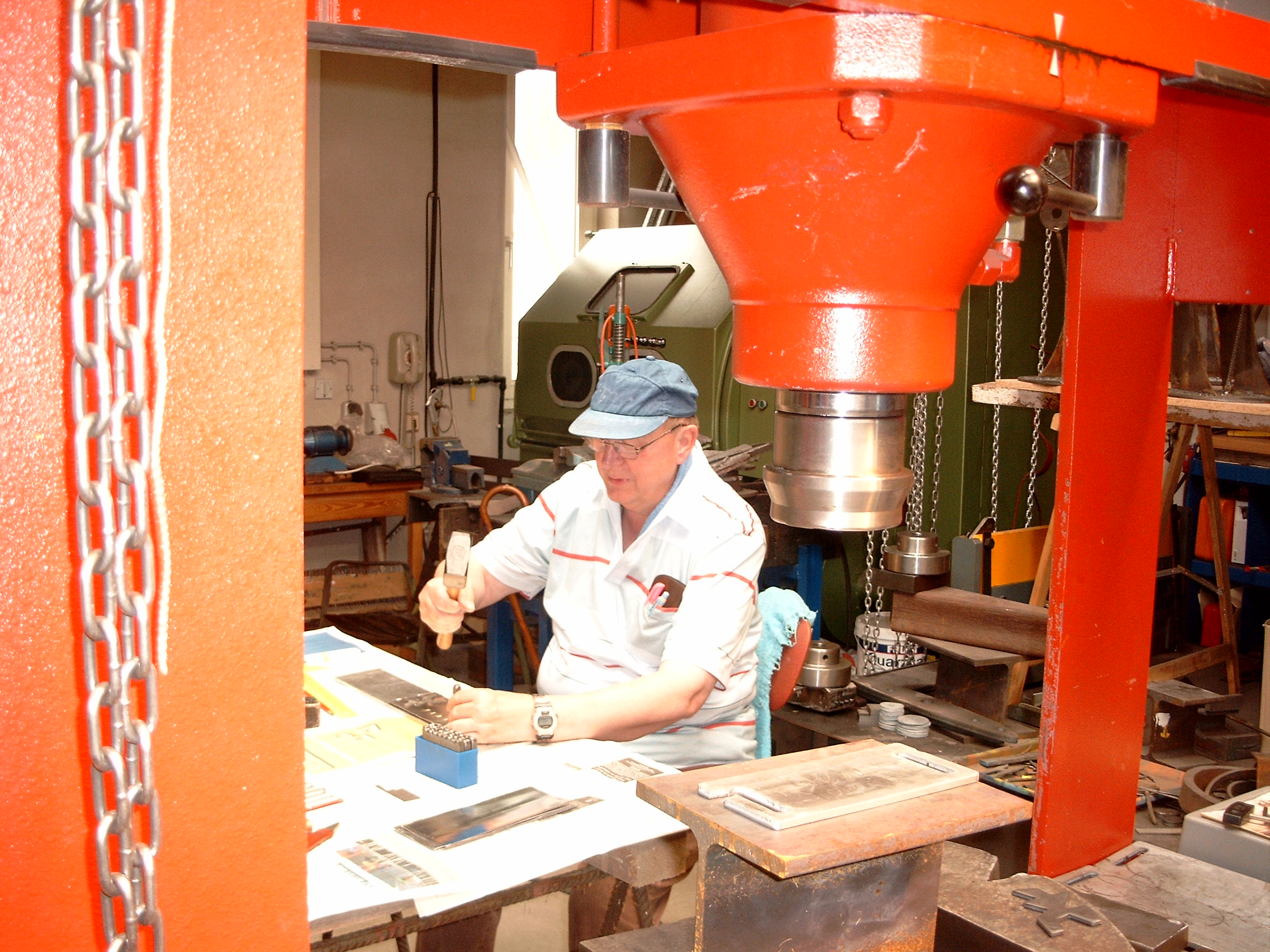
Prof. Claussen as Iron sculptor from Eisenbühl

- In 1983, he was appointed honorary member of the Hungarian Otolaryngologists Society.
- On 17 April 1991 the Medical Faculty of the University of Granada (Spain) conferred him the Honorary Medal of the Faculty con admiracion y afecto.
- On 22 January 2001, he received the honorary title "Knight of the Hungarian Culture“ with the Rakoczy Medal in a state occasion Budapest (Hungary) on "Day of the Hungarian Culture“ in the Stefanie Palace (formerly baroque palace of the Esterházy family).
- On 19 November 2004, he received in Chennai (formerly Madras, India) lifelong honorary membership of the Indian Otology Society.
- On 15 March 2005, he received in the Charles University in Prague (Czech Republic) the Golden Honor Medal of the Medical Faculty.
- On 1 January 2007, he received the Citizen Medal of the town of Bad Kissingen.

== Artist ==
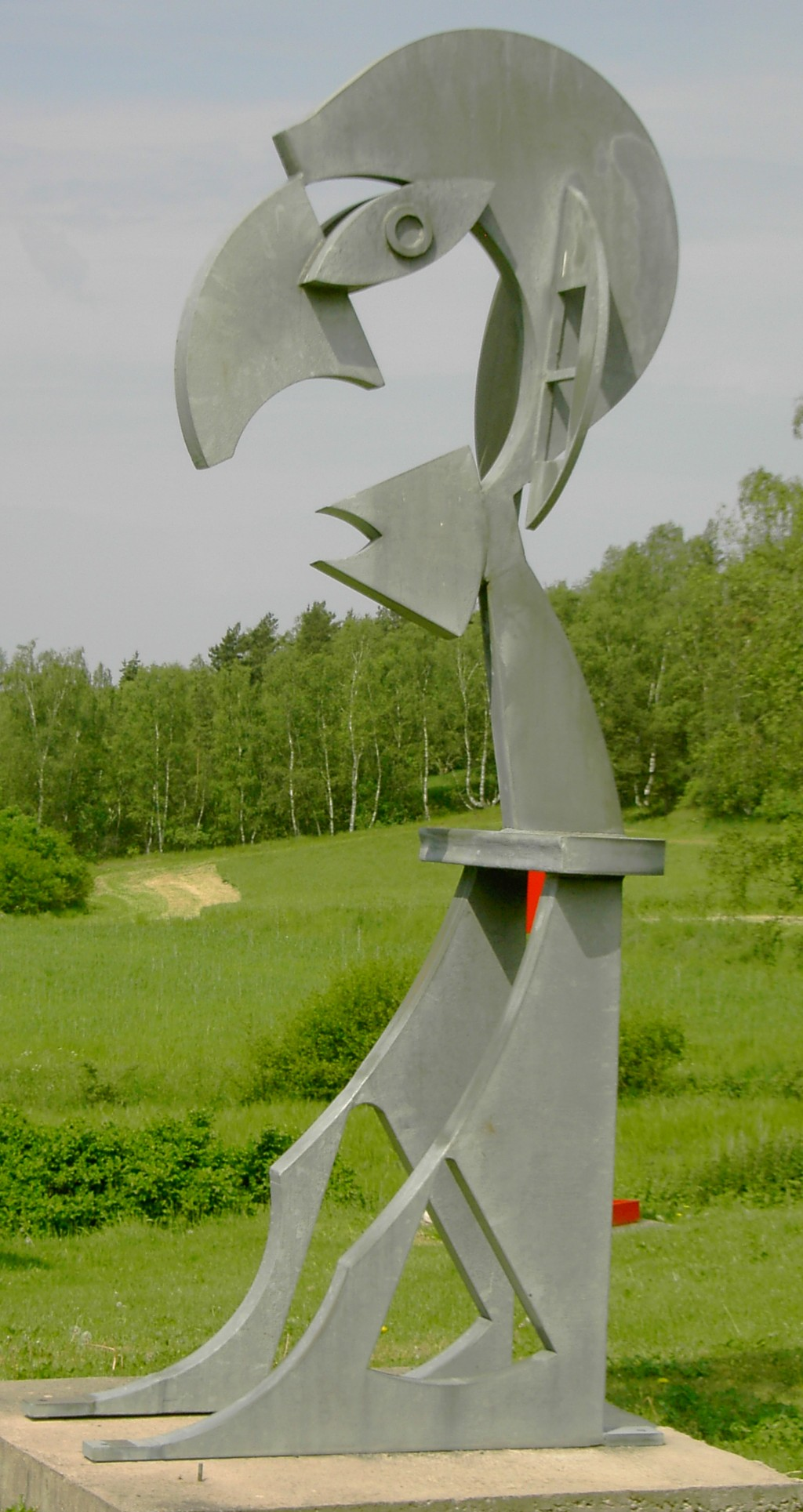
Claussen's Steel sculpture Gaia Astralis In the Fine Art Park of Eisenbühl (Weight: 7.5 t; Height: 5 m)

Since 1972, Claussen has created artworks – steel sculptures and oil paintings. In Eisenbühl (Landkreis Hof), Upper Franconia, Germany), the Iron bender from Eisenbühl conducts an atelier for steel sculptures, a Fine Art Park (since 1997 and expanded several times, lastly in 2009) and a museum hall. Since 1981, some of his steel large sculptures have been erected on public places in Switzerland, in Baden-Württemberg, Berlin and Franconia. One of Claussen's steel sculptures was erected in the Inner Court of the Charité in Berlin in 1991. His works of art have been exhibited in numerous single exhibitions since 1992.

Claussen regularly gave lectures about "the connections between science and art with practical examples“ (following invitations of the Art school of State University of New York in 1975 and of the University of Würzburg in 1976). Since his formulation of the concept of Narrative Sensologism as bridging concept between science, art and philosophy in 2002, Claussen has given lectures concerning this topic.

Claussen co-founded VAK ("Verein zur allgemeinen Kunstförderung", Association for General Art Promotion) in Lichtenberg (Upper Franconia) in 1987 and co-founded as a vice-president the European art association "Via Europae Sculpturarum“ in 1997.

In 1992, Claussen became the official artist of the Bayreuth Festival in Bayreuth with exhibiting his own sculptures in the interior and the exterior of the festival theatre.

Books written by Claussen about art are:

- Feuer, Stahl und Logik. Über Zusammenhänge zwischen Wissenschaft und Kunst. Edition M. u. P. Rudat, Hamburg u. Neu-Isenburg 1979, ISBN 3-922326-13-7
- Stahlskulpturen im Berger Winkel. Stählerne Zeichen des Seins über Wasser und Land in Claussen's Eisenpark zu Eisenbühl. Bad Kissingen 2005, ISBN 3-00-016967-9
- Drehen-Laufen-Leben. Gedichte. Eigenverlag, Bad Kissingen

Claussen said that, "Science is impression, Art is expression, as both of those have their origin in an idea which then finds its 'form' either in the artistic work or in the scientific proof [...] Whatever man strives for in art, science, religion and philosophy, is truth – however, how can we understand it within our limited capacities of perception?“

== Inventor ==
As a retired professor, Claussen worked on his project, a computer-aided automatically steering robot car for the elderly which monitors the occupants health and the car's roadworthiness. This invention is named after him, the "Auto-Cyberno-Mobil“, and is designed to maintain the mobility of the increased elderly population, as a consequence of demographic transition.

The book written by Claussen about the "Auto-Cyberno-Mobile“ is, Das Auto-Cyberno-Mobil. Ein autonomes, medizinisch-technisches Straßenfahrzeug für individuelle Fahrten in der dritten Lebensphase. Neurootologisches Forschungsinstitut der Gesellschaft zur Erforschung von Geruch-, Geschmack-, Gehör- und Gleichgewichtsstörungen (Hrsg.), Bad Kissingen 2007, ISBN 978-3-00-020941-3

== Publications ==
Claussen has written about 500 publications in four languages about medical-scientific-, artistic and technical subjects, among which are 33 books. Additionally, he was editor of the International Tinnitus Journal (ITJ; ISSN 0946-5448).

== Death ==
Claussen died after a long and serious illness on 4 September 2022, at the age of 83.

== See also ==
List of German inventors and discoverers
