= Windber Research Institute =

Windber Research Institute (WRI), now known as the Chan Soon-Shiong Institute of Molecular Medicine at Windber, is a private, non-profit biomedical research institute that is focused on women's health, cardiovascular disease and processes of aging, is located on Somerset Avenue in Windber, Pennsylvania. It opened in 2001. The first president, one of the co-founders of the institute, was Mr Nicholas Jacobs. Dr Richard Somiari was a co-founder and the first Scientific Director, Chief Scientific Officer and Chief Operating Officer of Windber Research Institute

== Description ==
The research of WRI is mainly divided into tissue banking, data warehousing of clinical, molecular (genomic and proteomic) and imaging data and data analysis and interpretation along with the biomedical informatics team.

Through an existing relationship with the Walter Reed Army Medical Center, in the Clinical Breast Care Program, WRI currently has greater than 14,000 highly annotated breast tissues, alone, with more than 500 data fields and single pathologist review on each patient, integrated with all the molecular and imaging data as well. Studies are ongoing regarding tumor heterogeneity, disease and patient stratification, environment and lifestyle risk factors, ethnicity, and biomarker development, all with a focus on addressing existing clinical problems.

In addition, WRI is examining the impact of lifestyle modification programs, using diet, stress management and exercise along with group support, to reduce cardiovascular risk factors, control obesity and impact diabetes. This is part of the Ornish Lifestyle Program that is offered at Windber.

Its diagnostic capabilities include digital and film mammography, 4-D ultrasound, 16-slice PET/CT and a 3T HD MRI which are integrated into the clinical data, molecular data and image repository.

In 2015, the Windber Medical Center and the WRI entered into an agreement with the Chan Soon-Shiong Institute of Molecular Medicine (SSSIOMM), founded by Dr. Patrick Soon-Shiong and his wife Michelle Chan, to create an integrated health care organization. The agreement included creating a precision cancer treatment and research institute.
