= Biomedical Research =

Scientific journal

- Discipline: Biomedical research
- Language: English
- Edited by: Jin Ding

Publication details
- History: 1990–present
- Publisher: Allied Academies
- Frequency: Quarterly
- Open access: Yes
- Impact factor: 0.219 (2016)

Standard abbreviations
- ISO 4: Biomed. Res.

Indexing
- CODEN: BIRSE8
- ISSN: 0970-938X (print); 0976-1683 (web)
- OCLC no.: 949768029

Links
- Journal homepage; Online access; Online archive; Journal page at publisher's website

Biomedical Research is a quarterly peer-reviewed medical journal covering research on biomedical sciences and experimental medicine. The editors-in-chief are Jin Ding (Eastern Hepatobiliary Surgery Hospital, Shanghai, China) and Ken Ichiro Inoue (University of Shizuoka). The journal was established in 1990 and is now published by Allied Academies, which is included on Jeffrey Beall's list of "potential, possible, or probable predatory publishers". Before being acquired by Allied Academies, the journal was published by Andrew John Publishing.

== Abstracting and indexing ==
The journal is abstracted and indexed in the following bibliographic databases:

- Academic Search Premier
- Chemical Abstracts Core
- EMBASE
- Scopus

According to the Journal Citation Reports, the journal has a 2016 impact factor of 0.219. This was its last impact factor, since the journal was dropped from Clarivate Analytics indexes in 2017.
