= List of medical journals =

Overview of medical journals

Medical journals are published regularly to communicate new research to clinicians, medical scientists, and other healthcare workers. This article lists academic journals that focus on the practice of medicine or any medical specialty. Journals are listed alphabetically by journal name, and also grouped by the subfield of medicine they focus on.

Journals for other fields of healthcare can be found at List of healthcare journals; see also List of nursing journals.

== Journals by name ==
Name	Specialty	Publisher	Language	Publication Dates
Academic Emergency Medicine	Emergency medicine research, education, and training	Society for Academic Emergency Medicine	English	1989–present
Academic Medicine	Academic medicine	Association of American Medical Colleges	English	1926–present
Acimed	Medical informatics	National Center of Information on Medical Sciences in Cuba	Spanish	1993–present
Acta Anaesthesiologica Scandinavica	Anaesthesiology, Intensive care	Scandinavian Society of Anaesthesiology and Intensive Care Medicine	English	1957–present
Acta Medica Mediterranea	Medicine	Editore Carbone	English	1985–present
Acta Médica Portuguesa	Medicine	Portuguese Medical Association	Portuguese	1979–present
Acta Neurologica Belgica	Neurology	Springer Science+Business Media	English & French	1901–present
Acta Neurologica Scandinavica	Neurology	Wiley-Blackwell	English	1925–present
Acta Orthopaedica et Traumatologica Turcica	Orthopedics	Turkish Association of Orthopaedics and Traumatology	English	1962–present
Acta Oto-Laryngologica	Otolaryngology	Taylor and Francis Group	English	1918–present
Acta Paediatrica	Pediatrics	Wiley-Blackwell	English	1921–present
Acta Psychiatrica Scandinavica	Psychiatry	Wiley-Blackwell	English	1926–present
Acta Radiologica	Radiology	SAGE Publishing	English	1921–present
Advances in Therapy	Clinical medicine	Springer Science+Business Media	English	1984–present
African Journal of Paediatric Surgery	Surgery	Medknow Publications	English	2004–present
AIDS	AIDS	Lippincott Williams & Wilkins	English	1987–present
Alimentary Pharmacology & Therapeutics	Pharmacology	Wiley-Blackwell	English	1987–present
Allergy, Asthma & Immunology Research	Immunology	Korean Academy of Asthma, Allergy and Clinical Immunology	English	2009–present
Alzheimer Disease and Associated Disorders	Alzheimer's	Lippincott Williams & Wilkins	English	1987–present
Alzheimer's Research & Therapy	Alzheimer's	BioMed Central	English	2009–present
American Family Physician	Family medicine	American Academy of Family Physicians	English	1969–present
American Journal of Alzheimer's Disease & Other Dementias	Neurology	SAGE Publishing	English	1986–present
American Journal of Emergency Medicine	Emergency medicine	Elsevier	English	1983–present
American Journal of Gastroenterology	Gastroenterology	Nature Publishing Group	English	1934–present
American Journal of Medical Genetics	Genetics	Wiley-Liss	English	1977–present
American Journal of the Medical Sciences	Medicine	Lippincott Williams & Wilkins	English	1820–present
American Journal of Obstetrics and Gynecology	Obstetrics and Gynecology	Elsevier	English	1920–present
American Journal of Public Health	Public Health	American Public Health Association	English	1911–present
American Journal of Respiratory and Critical Care Medicine	Critical Care	American Thoracic Society	English	1917–present
American Journal of Roentgenology	Radiology	American Roentgen Ray Society	English	1908–present
The American Journal of Surgical Pathology	Surgery, Pathology	Lippincott Williams & Wilkins	English	1977–present
American Journal of Translational Research	Medicine	e-Century Publishing Corporation	English	2009–present
American Journal of Transplantation	Transplantation	Wiley-Blackwell	English	2001–present
American Journal of Tropical Medicine and Hygiene	Tropical medicine	American Society of Tropical Medicine and Hygiene	English	1921–present
Anaesthesia	Anaesthesiology	Wiley-Blackwell	English	1946–present
Anesthesiology	Anaesthesiology	Lippincott Williams & Wilkins	English	1940–present
The Angle Orthodontist	Orthodontics	Allen Press	English	1931–present
Annals of Cardiac Anaesthesia	Anaesthesiology	Medknow Publications	English	1998–present
Annals of Emergency Medicine	Emergency medicine	Mosby	English	1972–present
Annals of Family Medicine	Family medicine	Annals of Family Medicine, Inc.	English	2003–present
Annals of Human Biology	Population biology	Taylor and Francis Group	English	1974–present
Annals of Human Genetics	Human genetics	John Wiley & Sons	English	1925–present
Annals of Internal Medicine	Internal medicine	American College of Physicians	English	1927–present
Annals of Medicine	Internal medicine	Taylor and Francis Group	English	1969–present
Annals of Pediatric Cardiology	Pediatrics, Cardiology	Medknow Publications	English	2008–present
The Annals of Pharmacotherapy	Pharmacology	SAGE Publishing	English	1967–present
Annals of Physical and Rehabilitation Medicine	Rehabilitation	Elsevier	English	1982–present
Annals of Plastic Surgery	Plastic surgery	Lippincott Williams & Wilkins	English	1978–present
Annals of the Royal College of Surgeons of England	Surgery	The Royal College of Surgeons of England	English	1947–present
Annals of Surgery	Surgery	Lippincott Williams & Wilkins	English	1885–present
Annual Review of Cancer Biology	Oncology	Annual Reviews	English	2017–present
Annual Review of Medicine	Medicine	Annual Reviews	English	1950–present
Archives of Disease in Childhood	Pediatrics	BMJ Group	English	1926–present
Archives of Osteoporosis	Bone Health	Springer Science+Business Media	English	2006–present
Arteriosclerosis, Thrombosis, and Vascular Biology	Vascular biology	Lippincott Williams & Wilkins	English	1981–present
Asian Cardiovascular and Thoracic Annals	Cardiology	SAGE Publishing	English	1998–present
Aviation, Space, and Environmental Medicine	Aviation medicine	Aerospace Medical Association	English	1930–present
BDJ Team	Dentistry	Nature Publishing Group	English	2014–present
Biological Research for Nursing	Nursing	SAGE Publishing	English	1999–present
Biology of the Neonate	Neonatology	Karger Publications	English	1959–present
Biomedical Imaging and Intervention Journal	Radiology	University of Malaysia	English	2005–present
BJUI	Urology	Wiley-Blackwell	English	1929–present
Blood	Hematology	American Society of Hematology	English	1946–present
Bone Marrow Transplantation	Transplantation	Nature Publishing Group	English	1986–present
BMC Cancer	Oncology	BioMed Central	English	2001–present
BMC Medicine	Medicine	BioMed Central	English	2003–present
BMJ	Medicine	BMJ	English	1840–present
Brain	Neurology	Oxford University Press	English	1878–present
Brazilian Journal of Medical and Biological Research	Medicine	Associação Brasileira de Divulgação Científica	English	1968–present
Breast Cancer Research and Treatment	Oncology	Springer Netherlands	English	1981–present
British Columbia Medical Journal	Medicine	British Columbia Medical Association	English	1924–present
British Dental Journal	Dentistry	Nature Publishing Group	English	1904–present
British Journal of Anaesthesia	Anaesthesiology	Oxford University Press	English	1923–present
British Journal of Cancer	Oncology	Nature Publishing Group	English	1947–present
British Journal of Dermatology	Dermatology	Wiley-Blackwell	English	1888–present
British Journal of Diabetes and Vascular Disease	Diabetes	SAGE Publishing	English	2001–present
British Journal of Hospital Medicine	Medicine	Mark Allen Healthcare Ltd	English	1966–present
British Journal of Medical Practitioners	Medicine	JMN Medical Education	English	2008–present
British Journal of Ophthalmology	Ophthalmology	BMJ Publishing Group	English	1917–present
British Journal of Sexual Medicine	Sexual Health	Hayward Medical Communications	English	1973–present
British Journal of Sports Medicine	Sports Medicine	BMJ Publishing Group	English	1964–present
British Journal of Surgery	Surgery	John Wiley & Sons	English	1913–present
Bulletin of the World Health Organization	Global Health	World Health Organization	English	1947–present
CA – A Cancer Journal for Clinicians	Oncology	Wiley-Blackwell	English	1950–present
Calcified Tissue International	Bone Health	Springer Science+Business Media	English	1967–present
Calicut Medical Journal	Medicine	Calicut Medical College	English	2003–present
Canadian Journal of Gastroenterology & Hepatology	Gastroenterology, Hepatology	Pulsus Group	English	1987–present
Canadian Journal of Infectious Diseases & Medical Microbiology	Infectious Disease	Pulsus Group	English	1990–present
Canadian Medical Association Journal	Medicine	Canadian Medical Association	English, French	1911–present
Canadian Respiratory Journal	Respiratory Health	Pulsus Group	English, French	1994–present
Cancer Medicine	Oncology	John Wiley & Sons	English	2012–present
Cardiology	Cardiology	Karger	English	1937–present
Cardiovascular Diabetology	Cardiology	BioMed Central	English	2002–present
Cardiovascular Drugs and Therapy	Cardiology	Springer Science+Business Media	English	1987–present
Cephalalgia	Headache	SAGE Publishing	English	1981–present
Chest	Cardiology, Respiratory Health	American College of Chest Physicians	English	1935–present
Child: Care, Health and Development	Pediatrics	Wiley-Blackwell	English	1975–present
Chinese Medical Journal	Medicine	Chinese Medical Association, Wolters Kluwer Medknow	English	1887–present
Chronic Illness	Chronic Illness	SAGE Publishing	English	2005–present
Circulation	Cardiology	Lippincott Williams & Wilkins	English	1950–present
The Cleft Palate-Craniofacial Journal	Craniofacial Medicine	SAGE Publishing	English	1964–present
Clinical Anatomy	Medicine	Wiley-Liss	English	1988–present
Clinical and Experimental Gastroenterology	Gastroenterology	Dove Medical Press	English	2008–present
Clinical and Translational Science	Medicine	Wiley-Blackwell	English	2008–present
Clinical Breast Cancer	Oncology	Elsevier	English	2000–present
Clinical Case Studies	Clinical medicine	SAGE Publishing	English	2002–present
Clinical Chemistry	Medicinal Chemistry	American Association for Clinical Chemistry	English	1955–present
Clinical Colorectal Cancer	Oncology	Elsevier	English	2001–present
Clinical Gastroenterology and Hepatology	Gastroenterology, Hepatology	Elsevier	English	2003–present
Clinical Genitourinary Cancer	Oncology	Elsevier	English	2002–present
Clinical Imaging	Radiology	Elsevier	English	1977–present
Clinical Infectious Diseases	Infectious Disease	Oxford University Press	English	1979–present
Clinical Practice	General Medicine	Open Access Journals (Pulsus Group)	English	2004–present
The Clinical Journal of Pain	Pain Management	Lippincott Williams & Wilkins	English	1985–present
Clinical Journal of Sport Medicine	Sports medicine	Lippincott Williams & Wilkins	English	1990–present
Clinical Lung Cancer	Oncology	Elsevier	English	1999–present
Clinical Lymphoma, Myeloma & Leukemia	Oncology	Elsevier	English	2000–present
Clinical Medicine: Oncology	Oncology	Libertas Academica	English	2007–present
Clinical Microbiology Reviews	Infectious Disease	American Society for Microbiology	English	1988–present
Clinical Ophthalmology	Ophthalmology	Dove Medical Press	English	2007–present
Clinical Ovarian Cancer	Oncology	Elsevier	English	2008–present
Clinical Pharmacology: Advances and Applications	Pharmacology	Dove Medical Press	English	2010–present
Clinical Pharmacology & Therapeutics	Pharmacology	Wiley-Blackwell	English	1960–present
Clinical Science	Medicine	Portland Press	English	1909–present
Clinical Toxicology	Toxicology	Taylor and Francis Group	English	1968–present
Contemporary Clinical Trials	Research Design	Elsevier	English	1980–present
COPD: Journal of Chronic Obstructive Pulmonary Disease	Respiratory Health	Informa Healthcare	English	2004–present
Critical Care Medicine	Emergency Medicine	Lippincott Williams & Wilkins	English	1973–present
Critical Reviews in Microbiology	Infectious Disease	Taylor and Francis Group	English	1971–present
Critical Reviews in Oncogenesis	Oncology	Taylor and Francis Group	English	1994–present
Critical Reviews in Toxicology	Toxicology	Taylor and Francis Group	English	1971–present
Current Gene Therapy	Gene Therapy	Bentham Science Publishers	English	2001–present
Current Medical Research and Opinion	Medicine	Taylor and Francis Group	English	1972–present
Current Pain and Headache Reports	Headache	Springer Science+Business Media	English	1994–present
Cutaneous and Ocular Toxicology	Toxicology	Taylor and Francis Group	English	1982–present
DARU Journal of Pharmaceutical Sciences	Pharmacy	BioMed Central	English	1990–present
Der Urologe	Urology	Springer Science+Business Media	German	1962–present
Deutsche Medizinische Wochenschrift	Medicine	Thieme Medical Publishers	German	1875–present
Developmental Neurorehabilitation	Neurology, Pediatrics	Taylor and Francis Group	English	1997–present
Diabetes	Diabetes	American Diabetes Association	English	1952–present
Diabetes and Vascular Disease Research	Diabetes	SAGE Publishing	English	2004–present
Diabetes Care	Diabetes	American Diabetes Association	English	1978–present
Diabetes, Metabolic Syndrome and Obesity: Targets and Therapy	Diabetes	Dove Medical Press	English	2008–present
Endocrinology	Endocrinology	The Endocrine Society	English	1917–present
Epilepsy Currents	Epilepsy	Allen Press	English	2001–present
EuroIntervention	Cardiology		English	2006–present
European Journal of Cancer Prevention	Oncology	Lippincott Williams & Wilkins	English	1991–present
European Journal of Clinical Investigation	Medicine	John Wiley & Sons	English	1970–present
European Journal of General Practice	Family medicine	Taylor & Francis	English	1995–present
European Journal of Medical Research	Clinical research	BioMed Central	English	1995–present
European Journal of Palliative Care	Palliative Care	Hayward Medical Communications	English	1994–present
European Journal of Physiotherapy	Physical Therapy	Taylor and Francis Group	English	1999–present
European Radiology	Radiology	Springer Science+Business Media	English	1991–present
European Urology	Urology	Elsevier	English	1975–present
Evolution, Medicine, and Public Health	Public Health	Oxford University Press	English	2013–present
Expert Opinion on Biological Therapy	Therapeutics	Taylor and Francis Group	English	2001–present
Expert Opinion on Drug Delivery	Pharmacology	Taylor and Francis Group	English	2004–present
Expert Opinion on Drug Discovery	Pharmacology	Taylor and Francis Group	English	2006–present
Expert Opinion on Drug Metabolism & Toxicology	Pharmacology	Taylor and Francis Group	English	2005–present
Expert Opinion on Drug Safety	Pharmacology	Informa	English	2002–present
Expert Opinion on Emerging Drugs	Pharmacology	Informa	English	1996–present
Expert Opinion on Investigational Drugs	Pharmacology	Informa	English	1992–present
Expert Opinion on Medical Diagnostics	Diagnostics	Informa	English	2007–2013
Expert Opinion on Pharmacotherapy	Pharmacology	Informa	English	1999–present
Expert Opinion on Therapeutic Patents	Patents	Informa	English	1991–present
Expert Opinion on Therapeutic Targets	Drug design	Informa	English	1997–present
Expert Review of Clinical Pharmacology	Clinical pharmacology	Informa	English	2008–present
Expert Review of Respiratory Medicine	Pulmonary	Taylor & Francis	English	2007–present
Family Practice (journal)	Family medicine	Oxford University Press	English	1984–present
Foot and Ankle Specialist	Orthopedics	SAGE Publications	English	2008–present
Frontiers in Medicine	Medicine	Frontiers Media	English	2014–present
Future Oncology	Oncology	Future Medicine Ltd	English	2005–present
Gastroenterology	Gastroenterology	Elsevier	English	1943–present
Geriatric Orthopaedic Surgery & Rehabilitation	Orthopaedic	SAGE Publications	English	2010–present
Gynecologic Oncology	Oncology, Gynecology	Elsevier	English	1972–present
Hand Therapy	Occupational Therapy	SAGE Publications	English	1991–present
Hand Surgery	Surgery	World Scientific	English	1996–present
Harefuah	Medicine	Israel Medical Association	Hebrew	1920–present
Heart	Cardiology	BMJ Group	English	1939–present
Hepatitis Monthly	Hepatitis	Kowsar	English	2002–present
HIV/AIDS: Research and Palliative Care	HIV	Dove Medical Press	English	2009–present
HIV Medicine	Medicine	Wiley-Blackwell	English	1999–present
Hormone Research	Endocrinology	Karger Publishers	English	1970–present
Hospital Practice	Medicine	Informa Healthcare	English	1966–present
Human Pathology	Pathology	Saunders	English	1970–present
Human Reproduction	Reproductive medicine	Oxford University Press	English	1986–present
Hypertension	Cardiology	American Heart Association	English	1979–present
Immunogenetics	Immunology, Genetics	Springer Science+Business Media	English	1974–present
Indian Journal of Anaesthesia	Anaesthesiology	Medknow Publications	English	2002–present
Indian Journal of Community Medicine	Community Medicine, Public Health	Medknow Publications	English	1976-present
Indian Journal of Dermatology	Dermatology	Medknow Publications	English	1955–present
Indian Journal of Dermatology, Venereology and Leprology	Dermatology	Medknow Publications	English	1990–present
Indian Journal of Gastroenterology	Gastroenterology	Indian Society of Gastroenterology	English	1982–present
Indian Journal of Medical Microbiology	Infectious Disease	Medknow Publications	English	1983–present
Indian Journal of Medical Research	Medicine	Medknow Publications	English	1913–present
Indian Journal of Medical Sciences	Medicine	Medknow Publications	English	1947–present
Indian Journal of Ophthalmology	Ophthalmology	Medknow Publications	English	1953–present
Innate Immunity	Immunology	SAGE Publications	English	1994–present
Indian Pacing and Electrophysiology Journal	Cardiology	Elsevier	English	2001–present
Indian Pacing and Electrophysiology Journal	Cardiology	Elsevier	English	2001–present
Internal Medicine Journal	Internal Medicine	Wiley	English	1952–present
International Archives of Medicine	Medicine	iMed.pub	English	2008–present
International Journal of Geriatric Psychiatry	Geriatrics, Psychology	John Wiley & Sons	English	1986–present
International Journal of Hyperthermia	Thermal Medicine	Taylor & Francis	English	1979–present
International Journal of Medical Sciences	Medicine	Ivyspring International Publisher	English	2004–present
International Journal of Obesity	Obesity	Nature Publishing Group	English	1977–present
International Journal of Psychoanalysis	Psychology	Wiley-Blackwell	English	1920–present
International Journal of Speech-Language Pathology	Speech Pathology	Informa	English	1999–present
International Journal of Surgery	Surgery	Elsevier	English	2003–present
Investigative Ophthalmology & Visual Science	Ophthalmology	Cadmus	English	1976–present
Intestinal Research	Gastrointestinal	Korean Association for the Study of Intestinal Diseases	English	2003–present
The Israel Journal of Psychiatry and Related Sciences	Psychiatry	Israel Science Publishers	English	2008–present
Israel Medical Association Journal	Medicine	Israel Medical Association	English	1999–present
JAMA: The Journal of the American Medical Association	Medicine	American Medical Association	English	1883–present
JAMA Dermatology	Dermatology	American Medical Association	English	1960–present
JAMA Facial Plastic Surgery	Plastic Surgery	American Medical Association	English	1999–present
JAMA Internal Medicine	Internal Medicine	American Medical Association	English	1908–present
JAMA Neurology	Neurology	American Medical Association	English	1960–present
JAMA Ophthalmology	Ophthalmology	American Medical Association	English	1929–present
JAMA Otolaryngology–Head & Neck Surgery	Surgery	American Medical Association	English	1925–present
JAMA Pediatrics	Pediatrics	American Medical Association	English	1911–present
JAMA Psychiatry	Psychiatry	American Medical Association	English	1959–present
JAMA Surgery	Surgery	American Medical Association	English	1920–present
The Johns Hopkins Medical Journal	Medicine	Johns Hopkins Press	English	1889–1982
Journal of Acquired Immune Deficiency Syndromes	HIV/AIDS	Lippincott Williams & Wilkins	English	1988–present
Journal of Adolescent and Young Adult Oncology	Oncology	Mary Ann Liebert, Inc.	English	2011–present
Journal of the American College of Cardiology	Cardiology	Elsevier	English	1983–present
Journal of the American Geriatrics Society	Geriatrics	Blackwell Science	English	2001–present
Journal of the American Osteopathic Association	Medicine	American Osteopathic Association	English	1901–present
Journal of Antibiotics	Medicine	Nature Publishing Group	English	1948–present
Journal of Ayurveda and Integrative Medicine	Integrative Medicine	Elsevier	English	2010–present
Journal of Bone and Joint Surgery	Bone Health	The Journal of Bone and Joint Surgery, Inc	English	1889–present
Journal of Cachexia, Sarcopenia and Muscle	Muscle Health	Wiley-Blackwell	English	2010–present
Journal of Cancer	Oncology	Ivyspring International Publisher	English	2010–present
Journal of Carcinogenesis	Oncology	Medknow Publications	English	2002–present
Journal of Cardiovascular Translational Research	Cardiology	International Society for Cardiovascular Translational Research	English	2008–present
Journal of Children's Orthopaedics	Orthopedics		English	2007–present
Journal of Clinical Endocrinology and Metabolism	Endocrinology	The Endocrine Society	English	1941–present
Journal of Clinical Investigation	Medicine	American Society for Clinical Investigation	English	1924–present
Journal of Clinical Oncology	Oncology	American Society of Clinical Oncology	English	1983–present
Journal of Clinical Orthodontics	Orthodontics	JPO, Inc	English	1967–present
Journal of Clinical Psychopharmacology	Psychology	Lippincott Williams & Wilkins	English	1981–present
Journal of Clinical Sleep Medicine	Sleep medicine	American Academy of Sleep Medicine	English	2005–present
Journal of Drugs in Dermatology	Dermatology	SanovaWorks	English	2003–present
Journal of Evidence-Based Medicine	Evidence-based medicine	John Wiley & Sons	English	2008–present
Journal of Experimental Medicine	Medicine	Rockefeller University Press	English	1896–present
Journal of Geriatric Cardiology	Geriatrics, Cardiology	Science Press	English	2004–present
Journal of Geriatric Psychiatry and Neurology	Geriatrics, Neurology	SAGE Publications	English	1988–present
Journals of Gerontology	Aging	Oxford University Press	English	1946–present
Journal of Hypertension	Cardiology	Lippincott Williams & Wilkins	English	1982–present
Journal of Immunology	Immunology	The American Association of Immunologists	English	1915–present
Journal of Infection in Developing Countries	Infectious Disease	Journal of Infection in Developing Countries	English	2006–present
Journal of Internal Medicine	Medicine	Wiley-Blackwell	English	1863–present
Journal of Clinical Interventional Radiology	Interventional Radiology	Thieme Medical Publishers	English	2017–present
Journal of Investigative Dermatology	Dermatology	Nature Publishing Group	English	1938–present
Journal of Medical Biochemistry	Biochemistry	Walter de Gruyter	English	1982–present
Journal of Medical Biography	Medical Personnel	SAGE Publishing	English	1993–present
Journal of Medical Case Reports	Medicine	BioMed Central	English	2007–present
Journal of Medical Economics	Medicine	Taylor and Francis Group	English	1998–present
Journal of Medical Genetics	Genetics	BMJ Group	English	1964–present
The Journal of Medical Practice Management	Health Management	Greenbranch Publishing	English	1984–present
Journal of Medicine	Medicine	Karger Publishers	English	1970–2004
Journal of Musculoskeletal Pain	Musculoskeletal	Informa Healthcare	English	1993–present
Journal of Nervous and Mental Disease	Psychiatry	Lippincott Williams & Wilkins	English	1874–present
Journal of Neurotherapy	Neurotherapy	Routledge/Taylor and Francis	English	1995–2013
Journal of Occupational and Environmental Medicine	Occupational Medicine	Lippincott Williams & Wilkins	English	1959–present
Journal of Oncology Practice	Oncology	American Society of Clinical Oncology	English	2005–present
Journal of Oral and Maxillofacial Pathology	Oral Surgery	Medknow Publications	English	1997–present
Journal of Orthodontics	Orthodontics	SAGE Publishing	English	1974–present
Journal of Pain Research	Pain	Dove Medical Press	English	2008–present
Journal of Pakistan Medical Association	Medicine	Pakistan Medical Association	English	1951–present
Journal of Pediatric Endocrinology and Metabolism	Endocrinology	Walter de Gruyter	English	1985–present
Journal of Pediatric Gastroenterology and Nutrition	Gastroenterology	Lippincott Williams & Wilkins	English	1982–present
Journal of Pediatric Health Care	Pediatrics	Elsevier	English	1987–present
Journal of Pediatric Orthopaedics B	Pediatrics	Lippincott Williams & Wilkins	English	1989–present
The Journal of Pediatrics	Pediatrics	Elsevier	English	1932–present
Journal of the Peripheral Nervous System	Neurology	John Wiley & Sons	English	1996–present
Journal of Postgraduate Medicine	Medicine	Medknow Publications	English	1955–present
Journal of Prosthetic Dentistry	Prosthodontics	Elsevier	English	1951–present
Journal of the Royal College of Physicians of Edinburgh	Medicine	Royal College of Physicians of Edinburgh	English	1971–present
Journal of the Royal Society of Medicine	Medicine	SAGE Publishing	English	1809–present
Journal of Studies on Alcohol and Drugs	Addiction	Alcohol Research Documentation	English	1940–present
Korean Journal of Anesthesiology	Anaesthesiology	Korean Society of Anesthesiologists	English	1968–present
Läkartidningen	Medicine	Swedish Medical Association	Swedish	1965–present
The Lancet	Medicine	Elsevier	English	1823–present
Langenbeck's Archives of Surgery	Surgery	Spring Science+Business Media	English	1860–present
Macedonian Journal of Medical Sciences	Medicine	Institute of Immunobiology and Human Genetics	English	2008–present
Mayo Clinic Proceedings	Medicine	Elsevier	English	1926–present
The Medical Journal of Australia	Medicine	Australasian Medical Publishing Company	English	1914–present
Medical Law International	Medical Law, Bioethics	SAGE Publishing	English	1993–present
The Medical Letter on Drugs and Therapeutics	Pharmacology	The Medical letter, Inc.	English	1959–present
Medicine, Conflict and Survival	Global Health	Taylor and Francis Group	English	1985–present
Melanoma Research	Oncology	Lippincott Williams & Wilkins	English	2004–present
Menopause	Gynecology, Aging	Lippincott Williams & Wilkins	English	1994–present
Mens Sana Monographs	Mental Health	Medknow Publications	English	2003–present
Middle East African Journal of Ophthalmology	Ophthalmology	Medknow Publications	English	1994–present
Minerva Cardiology and Angiology	Cardiology	Minerva Medica	English	1953–present
Missouri Medicine	Medicine	Missouri State Medical Association	English	1904–present
Molecular Medicine	Medicine	The Feinstein Institutes for Medical Research	English	1994–present
Molecular Neurodegeneration	Neurology	BioMed Central	English	2006–present
Mount Sinai Journal of Medicine	Medicine	John Wiley & Sons	English	1934–2012
Movement Disorders	Neurology	Wiley-Liss	English	1986–present
Myanmar Medical Journal	Medicine	Myanmar Medical Association	English	1953–present
Nano Biomedicine and Engineering	Medicine	Open-Access House of Science and Technology	English	2009–present
National Medical Journal of India	Medicine	All India Institute of Medical Sciences, New Delhi	English	1988–present
Nature Medicine	Medicine	Nature Publishing Group	English	1995–present
Nature Reviews Cancer	Oncology	Nature Publishing Group	English	2001–present
Nature Reviews Cardiology	Cardiology	Nature Publishing Group	English	2004–present
Nature Reviews Clinical Oncology	Oncology	Nature Publishing Group	English	2004–present
Nature Reviews Disease Primers	Medicine	Nature Publishing Group	English	2015–present
Nature Reviews Gastroenterology & Hepatology	Gastroenterology	Nature Publishing Group	English	2004–present
Nature Reviews Immunology	Immunology	Nature Publishing Group	English	2001–present
Nature Reviews Microbiology	Infectious Disease	Nature Publishing Group	English	2003–present
Nature Reviews Nephrology	Nephrology	Nature Publishing Group	English	2005–present
Nature Reviews Neurology	Neurology	Nature Publishing Group	English	2005–present
Nature Reviews Neuroscience	Neurology	Nature Publishing Group	English	2000–present
Nature Reviews Rheumatology	Rheumatology	Nature Publishing Group	English	2005–present
Nature Reviews Urology	Urology	Nature Publishing Group	English	2004–present
Nederlands Tijdschrift voor Geneeskunde	Medicine	Vereniging Nederlands Tijdschrift voor Geneeskunde	Dutch	1857–present
Neural Regeneration Research	Neurology	Publishing House of Neural Regeneration Research	English	2006–present
The Neurologist	Neurology	Lippincott Williams & Wilkins	English	1997–present
Neurology	Neurology	Lippincott Williams & Wilkins	English	1951–present
Neurology India	Neurology	Medknow Publications	English	1953–present
Neuro-Ophthalmology	Ophthalmology	Lippincott Williams & Wilkins	English	1980–present
Neuropsychiatric Disease and Treatment	Neuropsychiatry	Dove Medical Press	English	2005–present
Neuropsychiatry	Neuropsychiatry	Pulsus Group	English	2011–present
NeuroRehabilitation	Rehabilitation	IOS Press	English	1991–present
Neurochirurgie	Neurosurgery	Elsevier	English, Frence	1955–present
The New England Journal of Medicine	Medicine	Massachusetts Medical Society	English	1812–present
The New Zealand Medical Journal	Medicine	New Zealand Medical Association	English	1887–present
Nippon Naibunpi Gakkai Zasshi	Endocrinology	Japan Endocrine Society	Japanese	1925–present
Nursing Children and Young People	Pediatrics, Nursing	RCN Publishing	English	1989–present
Obstetrics and Gynecology	Obstetrics, Gynecology	Lippincott Williams & Wilkins	English	1953–present
Oman Journal of Ophthalmology	Ophthalmology	Medknow Publications	English	2008–present
OncoTargets and Therapy	Oncology	Dove Medical Press	English	2008–present
Onkologia i Radioterapia	Oncology, Radiology	Medical Project Poland	English, Polish	2007–present
Open Medicine	Medicine	Walter de Gruyter	English	2006–present
Orbit	Ophthalmology	Informa Healthcare	English	1982–present
Orvosi Hetilap	Medicine	Akadémiai Kiadó	Hungarian	1857–present
Osteoporosis International	Bone Health	Spring Science+Business Media	English	1990–present
Ostomy Wound Management	Wound care	HMP Communications	English	1980–present
Paediatrics & Child Health	Pediatrics	Pulsus Group	English	1996–present
Pain Research & Management	Neurology	Pulsus Group	English, French	1996–present
Pan American Journal of Public Health	Public Health	Pan American Health Organization	English, Portuguese, Spanish	1997–present
Pathologica	Pathology	Società Anatomo Patologi Ospedalieri Italiani	Italian, English	1908–present
Pediatric Research	Pediatrics	Nature Publishing Group	English	1967–present
Pediatrics	Pediatrics	American Academy of Pediatrics	English	1948–present
Perspectives in Vascular Surgery and Endovascular Therapy	Vascular	SAGE Publications	English	1988-2013
Personalized Medicine	Personalized Medicine	Future Medicine	English	2004–present
Pharmacotherapy	Pharmacy	Wiley-Blackwell	English	1981–present
Physical & Occupational Therapy in Pediatrics	Physical and occupational Therapy	Informa	English	1981–present
The Physician and Sportsmedicine	Sports Medicine	Informa Healthcare	English	1973–present
Plastic Surgery	Surgery	Pulsus Group	English	1993–present
PLoS Medicine	Medicine	Public Library of Science	English	2004–present
PLoS Neglected Tropical Diseases	Global Health	Public Library of Science	English	2007–present
Postgraduate Medicine	Medicine	Informa Healthcare	English	1916–present
Le Praticien en Anesthésie Réanimation	Anaesthesiology	Elsevier Masson	English	1997–present
Prehospital Emergency Care	Emergency Medicine, EMS	Taylor & Francis	English	1997–present
Preventive Medicine	Preventative Medicine	Elsevier	English	1972–present
Primary Dental Journal	Dentistry	SAGE Publishing	English	1994–present
Progress in Osteoporosis	Bone Health	International Osteoporosis Foundation	English	2000–present
Psychiatric Genetics	Psychiatry	Lippincott Williams & Wilkins	English	1990–present
Psychosomatic Medicine	Psychology	Lippincott Williams & Wilkins	English	1939–present
QJM: An International Journal of Medicine	Medicine	Oxford University Press	English	1907–present
Radiology	Radiology	Radiological Society of North America	English	1923–present
Rambam Maimonides Medical Journal	Medicine	Rambam Health Care Campus	English	2010–present
Rejuvenation Research	Aging	Mary Ann Liebert	English	1998–present
Reproductive Health	Reproductive Health	BioMed Central	English	2004–present
Research and Humanities in Medical Education	Medical humanities	Medical Humanities Group at the University College of Medical Sciences	English	2014–present
Reviews in Endocrine and Metabolic Disorders	Endocrinology	Springer Nature	English	2000–present
Revista Pediatría de Atención Primaria	Pediatrics	Exlibris Ediciones	English	1999–present
Scandinavian Journal of Infectious Diseases	Infectious Disease	Informa Healthcare	English	1969–present
Scandinavian Journal of Occupational Therapy	Occupational Therapy	Informa Healthcare	English	1993–present
Scandinavian Journal of Public Health	Public Health	SAGE Publishing	English	1973–present
Scandinavian Journal of Surgery	Surgery	SAGE Publishing	English	1919–present
Seminars in Thrombosis and Hemostasis	Hematology	Thieme Medical Publishers	English	1974–present
Scientia Pharmaceutica	Pharmacology	Österreichische Pharmazeutische Gesellschaft	English, German	1930–present
Seminars in Ophthalmology	Ophthalmology	Taylor & Francis	English	1986–present
Spine	Orthopedics	Lippincott Williams & Wilkins	English	1976–present
Statistics in Medicine	Statistics	John Wiley & Sons	English	1982–present
Stroke	Cardiology	Lippincott Williams & Wilkins	English	1970–present
Supportive Care in Cancer	Oncology	Springer Science+Business Media	English	1993–present
Surgery for Obesity and Related Diseases	Bariatric surgery	Elsevier	English	2005–present
Surgical Endoscopy	Surgery	Springer Science+Business Media	English	1986–present
Surgical Innovation	Surgery	SAGE Publications	English	1994–present
TAF Preventive Medicine Bulletin	Preventive Medicine	Gulhane Askeri Tip Akademisi	English	2001–present
Tehran University Medical Journal	Medicine	University of Tehran	English	1943–present
The Aging Male	Gerontology	Taylor and Francis Group	English	1998–present
The International Journal of Aging and Human Development	Gerontology	SAGE Publications	English	1970-present
The International Journal of Lower Extremity Wounds	Surgical	SAGE Publications	English	2010-present
The Journal of Rural Health	General	Wiley-Blackwell	English	1981-present
The Neuroradiology Journal	Radiology	SAGE Publications	English	1994-present
Transactions of the Royal Society of Tropical Medicine and Hygiene	Global Health	Oxford University Press	English	1908–present
Trends in Molecular Medicine	Medicine	Elsevier	English	1995–present
Turkish Journal of Surgery	Surgery	Bilimsel Tip Publishing House	English	1991–present
Turkish Journal of Urology	Urology	Turkish Association of Urology	English	1975–present
Women's Health Issues	Women's Health	Elsevier	English	1990–present
Zdoroviye	Popular scientific; medicine and hygiene	Zdorovjye	Russian	1955–present
Zeitschrift für Gerontologie und Geriatrie	Geriatrics	Springer Science+Business Media	German	1968–present

== Journals by specialty ==
=== Allergy ===
- Allergy
- Journal of Asthma
- Journal of Asthma & Allergy Educators

=== Anesthesiology ===
- Acta Anaesthesiologica Scandinavica
- Anaesthesia
- Anesthesia & Analgesia
- Annals of Cardiac Anaesthesia
- British Journal of Anaesthesia
- The Clinical Journal of Pain
- Current Opinion in Anesthesiology
- European Journal of Anaesthesiology
- Korean Journal of Anesthesiology
- Pain
- Le Praticien en Anesthésie Réanimation
- Seminars in Cardiothoracic and Vascular Anesthesia

=== Cleft palate and craniofacial anomalies ===
- The Cleft Palate-Craniofacial Journal

=== Dentistry ===
- List of dental journals

=== Pharmaceutical sciences ===
- Advanced Drug Delivery Reviews
- Health Economics
- International Journal of Medical Sciences
- International Journal of Pharmaceutics
- Journal of Controlled Release
- Journal of Enzyme Inhibition and Medicinal Chemistry

=== Pharmacology ===
- Alimentary Pharmacology & Therapeutics
- The Annals of Pharmacotherapy
- Clinical Pharmacology: Advances and Applications
- Clinical Pharmacology & Therapeutics
- Expert Opinion on Drug Delivery
- Expert Opinion on Drug Discovery
- Expert Opinion on Drug Metabolism & Toxicology
- Expert Opinion on Drug Safety
- Expert Opinion on Emerging Drugs
- Expert Opinion on Investigational Drugs
- Expert Opinion on Pharmacotherapy
- Indian Journal of Pharmacology
- The Medical Letter on Drugs and Therapeutics
- Scientia Pharmaceutica

=== Plastic Surgery ===
- Annals of Plastic Surgery
- Plastic and Reconstructive Surgery

=== Psychiatry ===
- American Journal of Psychiatry
- Archives of General Psychiatry
- Biological Psychiatry
- British Journal of Psychiatry
- Journal of Clinical Psychiatry
- Journal of Psychopharmacology
- Molecular Psychiatry
- Neuropsychopharmacology
- Schizophrenia Bulletin
- Schizophrenia Research

=== Sports Medicine ===
- American Journal of Sports Medicine
- British Journal of Sports Medicine
- Clinical Journal of Sport Medicine
- European Review of Aging and Physical Activity
- Exercise and Sport Sciences Reviews
- The Journal of Strength and Conditioning Research
- Medicine & Science in Sports & Exercise
- The Physician and Sportsmedicine
- Research in Sports Medicine
- Sports Health

=== Toxicology ===
- Journal of Applied Toxicology
- Toxicology
- Toxicology and Industrial Health
- Toxicologic Pathology
- Regulatory Toxicology and Pharmacology

== Defunct medical journals ==
- Human Resources Development Journal
- Medical Press and Circular
- Medical World
- The Zoist

== See also ==
- List of health care journals
- List of nursing journals
- List of scientific journals
- Lists of journals
- List of International Committee of Medical Journal Editors (ICMJE) member journals
