= Journal of Cancer =

- Language: English
- Edited by: Yan-Gao Man, Naoto T. Ueno

Publication details
- History: 2010-present
- Publisher: Ivyspring International Publisher
- Frequency: 9/year
- Open access: Yes
- License: CC by-nc-nd 3.0
- Impact factor: 3.609 (2016)

Standard abbreviations
- ISO 4: J. Cancer

Indexing
- CODEN: JCWAAL
- ISSN: 1837-9664
- OCLC no.: 630655947

Links
- Journal homepage; Online access; Current archive

The Journal of Cancer is a peer-reviewed open access medical journal covering all areas of cancer research and oncology, published by Ivyspring International Publisher. The editors-in-chief are Yan-Gao Man (Bon Secours Cancer Institute) and Naoto T. Ueno (University of Texas M. D. Anderson Cancer Center). The journal is abstracted and indexed in the Science Citation Index Expanded. The journal is included in the PubMed and PubMed Central.
