= Revista Pediatría de Atención Primaria =

- Discipline: Pediatrics
- Language: English

Publication details
- History: 1999–present
- Publisher: Exlibris Ediciones (Spain)
- Frequency: Quarterly
- Open access: Yes

Standard abbreviations
- ISO 4: Rev. Pediatr. Aten. Primaria

Indexing
- ISSN: 1139-7632 (print); 2174-4106 (web)
- OCLC no.: 436749494

Links
- Journal homepage

The Revista Pediatría de Atención Primaria (English: Journal of Pediatric Primary Care) is a quarterly peer-reviewed open access medical journal covering pediatrics. It is the official publication of the Asociación Española de Pediatría de Atención Primaria (Spanish Association of Primary Care Pediatrics). Since 2012, articles are in English with Spanish tables of contents. The journal was established in 1999.

== Editors-in-chief ==
The following persons have been or currently serve as editor-in-chief:

- Escribano-Ceruelo E, Menchero-Pinos F, Montón-Álvarez J. L. (1999-2000)
- Montón-Álvarez J. L. (2000-2001)
- Escribano-Ceruelo E. (2001-2002)
- Hernández-Merino A. (2002–present)

== Abstracting and indexing ==
The journal is abstracted and indexed in Latindex, SciELO, and Scopus.

== Code of ethics ==
The journal shares the Code of Ethics of the Asociación Española de Pediatría de Atención Primaria (Spanish Association of Primary Care Pediatrics).

== See also ==
- List of medical journals
- Open access in Spain
