= Journal of Evidence-Based Medicine =

- Discipline: Medicine
- Language: English
- Edited by: You-Ping Li; Mike Clarke

Publication details
- History: 2008–present
- Publisher: John Wiley & Sons
- Frequency: Quarterly
- Impact factor: 6.224 (2021)

Standard abbreviations
- ISO 4: J. Evid.-Based Med.

Indexing
- ISSN: 1756-5391
- LCCN: 2010243954
- OCLC no.: 1031869805

Links
- Journal homepage; Online access; Online archive

The Journal of Evidence-Based Medicine is a quarterly peer-reviewed medical journal covering evidence-based medicine. It was established in 2008 and is published by John Wiley & Sons on behalf of the Chinese Cochrane Centre, of which it is the official English-language journal. It grew out of a decade of work by editors of the Chinese Journal of Evidence Based Medicine to create a new journal with a global audience. The editors-in-chief are You-Ping Li (West China Medical Center) and Mike Clarke (Queen’s University Belfast). According to the Journal Citation Reports, the journal has a 2021 impact factor of 6.224, ranking it 33rd out of 172 journals in the category "Medicine, General & Internal".
