= Journal of Asthma & Allergy Educators =

- Discipline: Immunology
- Language: English
- Edited by: Concettina Tolomeo

Publication details
- History: 2010-2013
- Publisher: SAGE Publications
- Frequency: Bimonthly

Standard abbreviations
- ISO 4: J. Asthma Allergy Educ.

Indexing
- ISSN: 2150-1297 (print); 2150-1300 (web)
- OCLC no.: 428973455

Links
- Journal homepage; Online access; Online archive

The Journal of Asthma & Allergy Educators was a bimonthly peer-reviewed medical journal that covered research in the fields of pulmonary disorders and allergy, especially asthma, allergy management, and patient education. The editor-in-chief was Concettina Tolomeo (Yale School of Medicine). The journal was established in 2010 and published until December 2013 by SAGE Publications in association with the Association of Asthma Educators.

== Abstracting and indexing ==
The journal was abstracted and indexed in Scopus.
