= Immunogenetics (journal) =

- Discipline: Immunogenetics, Allergology
- Language: English
- Edited by: Ronald E. Bontrop

Publication details
- History: 1974–present
- Publisher: Springer Science+Business Media (Germany)
- Frequency: Monthly
- Open access: hybrid
- Impact factor: 2.621 (2019)

Standard abbreviations
- ISO 4: Immunogenetics

Indexing
- CODEN: IMNGBK
- ISSN: 0093-7711 (print); 1432-1211 (web)
- LCCN: 74643380
- OCLC no.: 01793392

Links
- Journal homepage

Immunogenetics is a peer-reviewed scientific journal covering immunogenetics, the branch of medical research that explores the relationship between the immune system and genetics. This journal publishes original research papers, brief communications and reviews in: immunogenetics of cell interaction, immunogenetics of tissue differentiation and development, phylogeny of alloantigens and of immune response, genetic control of immune response and disease susceptibility, and genetics and biochemistry of alloantigens.

Immunogenetics was first published yearly starting in December 1974 and then monthly since May 1981. It has an impact factor of 2.621 according to the Thomson Reuters 2019 Journal Citation Reports. The current editor-in-chief is Ronald E. Bontrop professor of Theoretical Biology and Bioinformatics at Utrecht University.

Immunogenetics is a hybrid open-access journal through the Springer Open Choice option.

== See also ==
- Immunogenetics
