= Expert Opinion on Drug Discovery =

- Discipline: Pharmacology
- Language: English

Publication details
- History: 2006-present
- Publisher: Taylor and Francis Group
- Frequency: Monthly
- Impact factor: 7.050 (2021)

Standard abbreviations
- ISO 4: Expert Opin. Drug Discov.

Indexing
- CODEN: EODDBX
- ISSN: 1746-0441

Links
- Journal homepage

Expert Opinion on Drug Discovery is a monthly peer-reviewed medical journal publishing review articles on novel technologies involved in drug discovery. The editor-in-chief is David Janero from Northeastern University.

== Abstracting and indexing ==
The journal is abstracted and indexed in Chemical Abstracts, EMBASE/Excerpta Medica, MEDLINE, Scopus, and Science Citation Index Expanded.
