= Asian Cardiovascular and Thoracic Annals =

- Discipline: Cardiology, cardiovascular medicine
- Language: English
- Edited by: A. Sampath Kumar

Publication details
- History: 1993-present
- Publisher: SAGE Publications
- Frequency: Bimonthly

Standard abbreviations
- ISO 4: Asian Cardiovasc. Thorac. Ann.

Indexing
- CODEN: ACTAFE
- ISSN: 0218-4923 (print); 1816-5370 (web)
- OCLC no.: 32144835

Links
- Journal homepage; Online access; Online archive

Asian Cardiovascular and Thoracic Annals is a bimonthly peer-reviewed academic journal that covers research in the fields of cardiology and cardiovascular medicine. The editor-in-chief is Yutaka Okita (Takatsuli General Hospital). It was established in 1993 by founder, Frank Tamru who launched Asia Publishing Exchange in Singapore to publish the region's first scientific journal for cardiovascular and thoracic surgeons. The journal was preceded by APEX (A Cardiac Newsletter for Asia) circulated by Tamru from 1985 to 1992 throughout Asia to inform readers of new developments in heart surgery, meeting dates & venues, and profiles on the region's leading cardiac surgeons. The journal is currently published by SAGE Publications in association with the Asian Society for Cardiovascular and Thoracic Surgery.

== Abstracting and indexing ==
Asian Cardiovascular and Thoracic Annals is abstracted and indexed in:

- Academic Search Premier
- Biological Abstracts
- Current Contents/Clinical Medicine
- Science Citation Index Expanded
- Scopus
