= The Neurologist =

Peer-reviewed medical journal

- Discipline: Neurology
- Language: English
- Edited by: Bart M. Demaerschalk, Dean M. Wingerchuk

Publication details
- Publisher: Lippincott Williams & Wilkins
- Frequency: Bimonthly
- Impact factor: 1.1 (2023)

Standard abbreviations
- ISO 4: Neurologist

Indexing
- ISSN: 1074-7931
- OCLC no.: 54380654

Links
- Journal homepage

The Neurologist is a peer-reviewed medical journal, which publishes articles related to neurological diseases, with a focus on clinical aspects.

== See also ==
- Journal of Neurology, Neurosurgery, and Psychiatry
