= The Aging Male =

- Discipline: Gerontology
- Language: English
- Edited by: Bruno Lunenfeld

Publication details
- Publisher: Taylor and Francis Group

Standard abbreviations
- ISO 4: Aging Male

Indexing
- CODEN: AGMAF7
- ISSN: 1368-5538 (print); 1473-0790 (web)
- LCCN: sn98-39317
- OCLC no.: 49885916

Links
- Journal homepage; Online access; Online archive

The Aging Male is a quarterly peer-reviewed medical journal that covers all aspects of male health throughout the aging process. It is the official journal of the International Society for the Study of the Aging Male and is published by Taylor and Francis Group. The journal is edited by Bruno Lunenfeld (Israel) and was established in 1998.

== Abstracting and indexing ==
The journal is abstracted and indexed in EMBASE/Excerpta Medica, MEDLINE, Science Citation Index, and Current Contents/Clinical Medicine.

The journal exhibited unusual levels of self-citation and its journal impact factor of 2019 was suspended from Journal Citation Reports in 2020, a sanction which hit 34 journals in total.
