= Biological Research for Nursing =

Biological Research For Nursing
- Discipline: Nursing
- Language: English
- Edited by: Carolyn Yucha

Publication details
- History: 1999-present
- Publisher: SAGE Publications
- Frequency: Quarterly
- Impact factor: 1.427 (2014)

Standard abbreviations
- ISO 4: Biol. Res. Nurs.

Indexing
- CODEN: BRNIAH
- ISSN: 1099-8004 (print); 1552-4175 (web)
- OCLC no.: 474783988

Links
- Journal homepage; Online access; Online archive

Biological Research for Nursing is a peer-reviewed nursing journal that focuses on biological research applied to nursing. The editor-in-chief is Carolyn Yucha (University of Nevada, Las Vegas). The journal was established in 1999 and is published by SAGE Publications.

== Abstracting and indexing ==
The journal is abstracted and indexed in Scopus and the Science Citation Index Expanded. According to the Journal Citation Reports, its 2014 impact factor is 1.427, ranking it 22 out of 110 journals in the category 'Nursing'.
