= Expert Opinion on Investigational Drugs =

- Discipline: Pharmacology
- Language: English

Publication details
- Former name(s): Current Opinion in Investigational Drugs
- History: 1992-present
- Publisher: Taylor & Francis (United Kingdom)
- Frequency: Monthly
- Impact factor: 6.498 (2021)

Standard abbreviations
- ISO 4: Expert Opin. Investig. Drugs

Indexing
- CODEN: EOIDER
- ISSN: 1354-3784 (print); 1744-7658 (web)
- OCLC no.: 30379431

Links
- Journal homepage

Expert Opinion on Investigational Drugs is a monthly peer-reviewed medical journal covering developments in pharmaceutical research, from animal studies through to early clinical investigation. The journal's scope includes therapeutics in many areas: pulmonary-allergy, dermatology, gastrointestinal, arthritis, infectious disorders, endocrine and metabolic, central and peripheral nervous system, cardiovascular and renal, and oncology.

The journal was established by Current Drugs in 1992, under the title Current Opinion in Investigational Drugs. In 1994, the journal was acquired by Ashley Publications, who published it until 2015, when it was acquired by Taylor & Francis. The current Editor-in-Chief is Dr. Naim Alkhouri (Texas Liver Institute, San Antonio, Texas, USA). According to the Journal Citation Reports, the Journal has a 2021 impact factor of 6.498. It is also indexed in MEDLINE. The journal is available online and in paper format.
