= Scandinavian Journal of Public Health =

- Discipline: Public health
- Language: English
- Edited by: Terje Andreas Eikemo

Publication details
- Former names: Acta Socio-Medica Scandinavica; Scandinavian Journal of Social Medicine
- History: 1973-present
- Publisher: SAGE Publishing on behalf of the Associations of Public Health in the Nordic Countries
- Frequency: 8/year
- Impact factor: 3.4 (2022)

Standard abbreviations
- ISO 4: Scand. J. Public Health

Indexing
- CODEN: SJPHAJ
- ISSN: 1403-4948 (print); 1651-1905 (web)
- OCLC no.: 644966353

Links
- Journal homepage; Online access; Online archive

The Scandinavian Journal of Public Health is a peer-reviewed academic journal covering the public health field. The editor-in-chief is Terje Andreas Eikemo (Norwegian University of Science and Technology). The journal was established in 1969 and is published by SAGE Publications on behalf of the Associations of Public Health in the Nordic Countries.

== History ==
The journal was established in 1969 as the Acta Socio-Medica Scandinavica. It was renamed the Scandinavian Journal of Social Medicine in 1973, obtaining its current name in 1999.

== List of editors ==
The following persons are or have been editors-in-chief of the journal:

- 1969: Gunnar Inghe
- 1977: Ragnar Berfenstam
- 1982: Lars Olov Bygren
- 2000: Stig Wall
- 2008: Finn Kamper-Jørgensen
- 2012: Ingvar Karlberg
- 2016-present: Terje Andreas Eikemo

== Abstracting and indexing ==
The journal is abstracted and indexed in Scopus, the Science Citation Index Expanded, and the Social Sciences Citation Index. According to the Journal Citation Reports, the journal has a 2022 impact factor of 3.4.
