= Journal of Pediatric Health Care =

- Discipline: Pediatrics
- Language: English
- Edited by: Martha K. Swartz

Publication details
- History: 1987-present
- Publisher: Elsevier
- Frequency: Bimonthly
- Impact factor: 1.615 (2015)

Standard abbreviations
- ISO 4: J. Pediatr. Health Care

Indexing
- CODEN: JPHCED
- ISSN: 0891-5245 (print); 1532-656X (web)
- OCLC no.: 14878057

Links
- Journal homepage; Online access; Online archive

The Journal of Pediatric Health Care is a bimonthly peer-reviewed medical journal covering pediatrics. It was established in 1987 and is published by Elsevier on behalf of the National Association of Pediatric Nurse Practitioners, of which it is the official journal. The editor-in-chief is Martha K. Swartz (Yale University). According to the Journal Citation Reports, the journal has a 2015 impact factor of 1.615.
