= Journal of Enzyme Inhibition and Medicinal Chemistry =

- Discipline: Pharmacology, pharmacy, toxicology
- Language: English
- Edited by: Claudiu T. Supuran

Publication details
- Former name(s): Journal of Enzyme Inhibition
- History: 1985–present
- Publisher: Informa
- Frequency: Bimonthly
- Impact factor: 4.310 (2020)

Standard abbreviations
- ISO 4: J. Enzyme Inhib. Med. Chem.

Indexing
- ISSN: 1475-6366 (print); 1475-6374 (web)
- LCCN: 2002243339
- OCLC no.: 50012503

Links
- Journal homepage; Online access; Online archive

The Journal of Enzyme Inhibition and Medicinal Chemistry is a peer-reviewed open access medical journal published by Taylor & Francis that covers research on enzyme inhibitors and inhibitory processes as well as agonist/antagonist receptor interactions in the development of medicinal and anti-cancer agents. The editor-in-chief is Claudiu T. Supuran.

== Abstracting and indexing ==
The Journal of Enzyme Inhibition and Medicinal Chemistry is abstracted and indexed in:

- Current Contents/Life Sciences
- Science Citation Index
- BIOSIS
- Biotechnology Citation Index
- Elsevier BIOBASE/Current Awareness in Biological Sciences
- Chemical Abstracts Service
- EMBASE/Excerpta Medica
- Index Medicus/MEDLINE
- Scopus
