= Clinical Imaging =

- Discipline: Medical imaging
- Language: English
- Edited by: Elizabeth Kagan Arleo

Publication details
- Former name(s): Computed Axial Tomography; CT: The Journal of Computed Tomography
- History: 1977–present
- Publisher: Elsevier

Standard abbreviations
- ISO 4: Clin. Imaging

Indexing
- ISSN: 0899-7071 (print); 1873-4499 (web)

Links
- Journal homepage; Online archive

Clinical Imaging is a peer-reviewed academic journal on medical imaging. It was founded in 1977 and received its current title in 1989. It is published by Elsevier on behalf of the New York Roentgen Society.

== History ==
The journal began publication in 1977 as Computed Axial Tomography. The founding editor was Rolf L. Schapiro. It was renamed CT: The Journal of Computed Tomography in 1978, and in 1989 obtained its present title. In 2012 it gained the sponsorship of the New York Roentgen Society. As of 2022 the editor-in-chief is Elizabeth Kagan Arleo.

== Abstracting and indexing ==
Clinical Imaging is indexed in:

- Academic Search Premier
- Biotechnology Research Abstracts (ProQuest)
- Compendex
- Embase
- MEDLINE
- Science Citation Index Expanded
- Scopus
