= Clinical Lymphoma, Myeloma & Leukemia =

- Discipline: Oncology
- Language: English
- Edited by: Bruce D. Cheson, Jorge E. Cortés, Sundar Jagannath

Publication details
- Former name(s): Clinical Lymphoma; Clinical Lymphoma & Myeloma
- History: 2000-present
- Publisher: Elsevier
- Frequency: Bimonthly
- Impact factor: 2.02 (2014)

Standard abbreviations
- ISO 4: Clin. Lymphoma Myeloma Leuk.

Indexing
- ISSN: 2152-2650 (print); 2152-2669 (web)
- LCCN: 2009207906
- OCLC no.: 475047678

Links
- Journal homepage; Online access; Journal page at publisher's website

Clinical Lymphoma, Myeloma & Leukemia is a peer-reviewed medical journal published by Elsevier (previously by CIG Media Group). It was established as Clinical Lymphoma in 2000, renamed to Clinical Lymphoma & Myeloma in 2005 and obtained its current name in 2010. The journal covers research on detection, diagnosis, prevention, and treatment of lymphoma, myeloma, leukemia, and related disorders, including macroglobulinemia, amyloidosis, and plasma-cell dyscrasias.

== Abstracting and indexing ==
The journal is abstracted and indexed in Index Medicus/MEDLINE/PubMed, EMBASE, Excerpta Medica, Current Contents/Clinical Medicine, CINAHL, Chemical Abstracts, Scopus, and the Science Citation Index Expanded. According to the Journal Citation Reports, the journal has a 2014 impact factor of 2.02.
