= Clinical Breast Cancer =

Peer-reviewed scientific journal

- Discipline: Oncology
- Language: English
- Edited by: Ruth O'Regan

Publication details
- History: 2000-present
- Publisher: Elsevier
- Frequency: Bimonthly
- Impact factor: 2.703 (2017)

Standard abbreviations
- ISO 4: Clin. Breast Cancer

Indexing
- ISSN: 1526-8209

Links
- Journal homepage; Online access

Clinical Breast Cancer is a bimonthly peer-reviewed medical journal established in 2000 and published by Elsevier. It covers all areas related to breast cancer.

== Abstracting and indexing ==
Clinical Breast Cancer is indexed by Index Medicus/PubMed, EMBASE Excerpta Medica, ISI Current Contents, CINAHL, Scopus, and Chemical Abstracts. According to the Journal Citation Reports, the journal has a 2017 impact factor of 2.703.
