= Endocrine Journal =

- Discipline: Endocrinology
- Language: English
- Edited by: Itaru Kojima

Publication details
- Former names: Naibunpigaku Zasshi, Nihon Naibunpigaku-kai Zasshi, Endocrinologia Japonica
- History: 1925–present
- Publisher: The Japan Endocrine Society (Japan)
- Frequency: Monthly
- Open access: Yes
- Impact factor: 2.019 (2013)

Standard abbreviations
- ISO 4: Endocr. J.

Indexing
- CODEN: ENJOEO
- ISSN: 0918-8959 (print); 1348-4540 (web)
- OCLC no.: 53816300

Links
- Journal homepage; Online access

Endocrine Journal is a monthly peer-reviewed medical journal covering endocrinology published by The Japan Endocrine Society. It was established in 1925 as Naibunpigaku Zasshi and renamed Nihon Naibunpigaku-kai Zasshi in 1927. In 1954 it was restarted as an English journal, entitled Endocrinologia Japonica and obtained its current title in 1993. The editor-in-chief is Itaru Kojima (Gunma University).
