= Foot and Ankle Specialist =

- Discipline: Orthopedics
- Language: English
- Edited by: Gregory C. Berlet, Lowell Weil, Jr.

Publication details
- History: 2008-present
- Publisher: SAGE Publications
- Frequency: Bimonthly

Standard abbreviations
- ISO 4: Foot Ankle Spec.

Indexing
- ISSN: 1938-6400 (print); 1938-7636 (web)
- LCCN: 2007215006
- OCLC no.: 143463504

Links
- Journal homepage; Online access; Online archive

Foot & Ankle Specialist is a bimonthly peer-reviewed medical journal that covers the field of orthopedics. The editors-in-chief are Gregory C. Berlet and Lowell Weil, Jr. (Weil Foot & Ankle Institute). It was established in 2008 and is currently published by SAGE Publications.

== Abstracting and indexing ==
Foot & Ankle Specialist is abstracted and indexed in PubMed, Medline, EMBASE, and Scopus.
