= Intestinal Research =

- Discipline: Gastroenterology
- Language: English
- Edited by: Toshifumi Hibi

Publication details
- History: 2003-present
- Publisher: Korean Association for the Study of Intestinal Diseases (South Korea)
- Frequency: Quarterly
- Open access: Yes
- License: CC BY-NC

Standard abbreviations
- ISO 4: Intest. Res.

Indexing
- ISSN: 1598-9100 (print); 2288-1956 (web)
- OCLC no.: 762757101

Links
- Journal homepage; Online access; Online archive

Intestinal Research is a quarterly peer-reviewed open access medical journal covering the fields of intestinal diseases (especially inflammatory bowel disease). It is published by the Korean Association for the Study of Intestinal Diseases in collaboration with the Asian Organization for Crohn's and Colitis, Chinese Society of IBD, Japanese Society for IBD, Taiwan Society of IBD, and Colitis Crohn's Foundation (India). The editor-in-chief is Toshifumi Hibi (Kitasato University). The journal was established in 2003 and published semiannually; as of 2012 it appears quarterly. Originally published in Korean with abstracts in English, the journal is now published exclusively in English.

== Abstracting and indexing ==
The journal is abstracted and indexed in:

- Emerging Sources Citation Index
- Korea Citation Index
- Scopus
