= Turkish Journal of Urology =

- Discipline: Urology
- Language: English
- Edited by: Önder Yaman

Publication details
- Former name(s): Türk Üroloji Dergisi
- History: 1975-present
- Publisher: Turkish Association of Urology (Turkey)
- Frequency: Quarterly

Standard abbreviations
- ISO 4: Turk. J. Urol.

Indexing
- ISSN: 2149-3235 (print); 2149-3057 (web)
- OCLC no.: 828116578

Links
- Journal homepage; [https://turkishjournalofurology.com/eng/ Online access]; [https://turkishjournalofurology.com/eng/ Online archive]

The Turkish Journal of Urology is a quarterly peer-reviewed academic journal covering all aspects of urology. It is published by the Turkish Association of Urology and was established in 1975. The editor-in-chief is Önder Yaman (Ankara University).

== Abstracting and indexing ==
The journal is abstracted and indexed in Scopus, CINAHL, EBSCO databases, and ProQuest databases.
