= Seminars in Cardiothoracic and Vascular Anesthesia =

- Discipline: anaesthesiology, cardiology
- Language: English
- Edited by: Nathaen Weitzel

Publication details
- History: 1997-present
- Publisher: SAGE Publications
- Frequency: Quarterly

Standard abbreviations
- ISO 4: Semin. Cardiothorac. Vasc. Anesth.

Indexing
- ISSN: 1089-2532 (print); 1940-5596 (web)
- OCLC no.: 34949334

Links
- Journal homepage; Online access; Online archive

Seminars in Cardiothoracic and Vascular Anesthesia is a quarterly peer-reviewed medical journal that covers research in the field of anesthesiology applied to cardiology. The editor-in-chiefs are Nathaen Weitzel and Miklos D. Kertai. It was established in 1997 and is currently published by SAGE Publications.

== Abstracting and indexing ==
Seminars in Cardiothoracic and Vascular Anesthesia is abstracted and indexed in CINAHL, EMBASE, MEDLINE, and Ovid.
