= International Journal of Hyperthermia =

- Discipline: Medicine
- Language: English
- Edited by: M.W. Dewhirst

Publication details
- History: 1979–present
- Publisher: Taylor & Francis (United States)
- Frequency: 8/year
- Open access: Yes (since June 2018)
- Impact factor: 3.98 (2019)

Standard abbreviations
- ISO 4: Int. J. Hyperth.

Indexing
- ISSN: 1464-5157 (print); 0265-6736 (web)

Links
- Journal homepage; Online access

The International Journal of Hyperthermia and Thermal Therapies is a peer-reviewed medical journal and the official journal of the Society for Thermal Medicine, the European Society for Hyperthermic Oncology, and the Japanese Society of Hyperthermic Oncology. It covers research and clinical studies and trials on hyperthermia and other thermal therapies (e.g. thermal ablation, cryo therapies) which fall largely into the three main categories of clinical studies, biological studies, and physics/engineering studies on techniques of heat delivery and temperature measurement. Starting June 2018, the journal became a fully Open Access Journal.

== Editor ==
The editor in chief of the International Journal of Hyperthermia is M.W. Dewhirst (Department of Radiation Oncology, Duke University Medical Center.
