= Melanoma Research =

- Discipline: Oncology
- Language: English
- Edited by: F.J. Lejeune

Publication details
- History: 1991-present
- Publisher: Lippincott Williams & Wilkins
- Frequency: Bimonthly
- Impact factor: 3.599 (2020)

Standard abbreviations
- ISO 4: Melanoma Res.

Indexing
- ISSN: 0960-8931 (print); 1473-5636 (web)
- OCLC no.: 24024301

Links
- Online access; Online archive

Melanoma Research is a bimonthly peer-reviewed medical journal published by Lippincott Williams & Wilkins and the editor-in-chief is F.J. Lejeune. It was established in 1991. The journal covers both experimental and clinical research on melanoma.

== Abstracting and indexing ==
According to the Journal Citation Reports, the journal has a 2020 impact factor of 3.599.
