= Der Urologe =

- Discipline: Urology
- Language: German
- Edited by: Bernd Wullich

Publication details
- History: 1962–present
- Publisher: Springer Medizin (Germany)
- Frequency: Monthly
- Impact factor: 0.437 (2017)

Standard abbreviations
- ISO 4: Urologe

Indexing
- ISSN: 0340-2592 (print); 1433-0563 (web)

Links
- Journal homepage; Online access

Der Urologe is a peer-reviewed scientific journal of urology published by Springer Medizin. It was established in 1962. The current editor-in-chief is Bernd Wullich.

In 1970, the journal split into Der Urologe. Ausg. A and Der Urologe. Ausg. B (which continued the short-lived Der Urologische Facharzt, published from 1968 to 1969). Der Urologe. Ausg. B ceased publications in 2002, upon which Der Urologe. Ausg. A was renamed Der Urologe.
