= Clinical Medicine Insights: Oncology =

- Discipline: Oncology
- Language: English
- Edited by: William Cho

Publication details
- History: 2007–present
- Publisher: Sage Publishing
- Frequency: Continuous
- Open access: Yes
- License: CC BY
- Impact factor: 1.9 (2024)

Standard abbreviations
- ISO 4: Clin. Med. Insights: Oncol.

Indexing
- ISSN: 1179-5549

Links
- Journal homepage; Online access; Online archive

Clinical Medicine Insights: Oncology is a peer-reviewed open-access medical journal focusing on all aspects of oncology. It was established in 2007 and was originally published by Libertas Academica. SAGE Publishing became the publisher in September 2016. The editor-in-chief is William Cho.

== Abstracting and indexing ==
The journal is abstracted and indexed in:

- Directory of Open Access Journals
- EBSCO databases
- Science Citation Index Expanded
- Scopus

According to the Journal Citation Reports, the journal has a 2024 impact factor of 1.9.
