= Minerva Cardiology and Angiology =

- Discipline: Cardiology
- Language: English
- Edited by: Giuseppe Biondi-Zoccai

Publication details
- Former name(s): Minerva Cardioangiologica
- History: 1953–present
- Publisher: Minerva Medica
- Frequency: Bimonthly
- Impact factor: 2.269 (2021)

Standard abbreviations
- ISO 4: Minerva Cardiol. Angiol.

Indexing
- CODEN: MICAAU
- ISSN: 2724-5683 (print); 2724-5772 (web)
- OCLC no.: 741710196

Links
- Journal homepage

Minerva Cardiology and Angiology, formerly Minerva Cardioangiologica, is a bimonthly peer-reviewed medical journal founded in 1953, that publishes research articles, as well as editorials, reviews, and correspondence pieces on the study and management of cardiovascular diseases. The journal is affiliated with the Italian Society of Angiology and Vascular Medicine (Società Italiana di Angiologia e Patologia Vascolare), the Italian College of Phlebology (Collegio Italiano di Flebologia), and the Italian Society of Microcirculation (Società Italiana di Microcircolazione), and it is published for them by Edizioni Minerva Medica. The editor-in-chief is Giuseppe Biondi-Zoccai (Sapienza University of Rome).

== Abstracting and indexing ==
The journal is abstracted and indexed in MEDLINE, PubMed, Science Citation Index, and Scopus. According to the Journal Citation Reports, the journal has a 2021 impact factor of 2.269.
