= European Review of Aging and Physical Activity =

Medical journal

- Discipline: Exercise science Gerontology
- Language: English
- Edited by: Yael Netz; Antoine Langeard

Publication details
- History: 2004–present
- Publisher: BioMed Central
- Frequency: Biannual
- Impact factor: 2.517 (2018)

Standard abbreviations
- ISO 4: Eur. Rev. Aging Phys. Act.

Indexing
- ISSN: 1813-7253 (print); 1861-6909 (web)
- LCCN: 2008220487
- OCLC no.: 712805481

Links
- Journal homepage; Online archive

The European Review of Aging and Physical Activity is a biannual peer-reviewed open access medical journal covering the intersection of gerontology and exercise science. It was established in 2004 and is published exclusively online by BioMed Central. It is the official journal of the European Group for Research into Elderly and Physical Activity. The editors-in-chief are Yael Netz (Wingate Institute) and Antoine Langeard (Université de Caen Normandie). According to the Journal Citation Reports, the journal has a 2024 impact factor of 3.5.
