= Scandinavian Journal of Occupational Therapy =

- Discipline: Occupational therapy
- Language: English
- Edited by: Ingeborg Nilsson

Publication details
- History: Since 1993
- Publisher: Springer Science+Business Media
- Frequency: Continuous
- Open access: Yes
- License: Creative Commons
- Impact factor: 1.7 (2025)

Standard abbreviations
- ISO 4: Scand. J. Occup. Ther.

Indexing
- CODEN: SJOTCI
- ISSN: 1103-8128 (print); 1651-2014 (web)
- LCCN: 2007233292
- OCLC no.: 804091928

Links
- Journal homepage; Online archive

The Scandinavian Journal of Occupational Therapy is a peer-reviewed medical journal covering the field of occupational therapy. It is published by Springer Science+Business Media on behalf of the Scandinavian Journal of Occupational Therapy Foundation. The editor-in-chief is Ingeborg Nilsson (Umeå University).

== Abstracting and indexing ==
The journal is abstracted and indexed in:

- CINAHL
- Directory of Open Access Journals
- EBSCO databases
- Index Medicus/MEDLINE/PubMed
- Science Citation Index Expanded
- Scopus
- Social Sciences Citation Index

According to the Journal Citation Reports, the journal has a 2025 impact factor of 1.7.
