= Journal of Clinical Interventional Radiology =

- Discipline: Interventional radiology
- Language: English
- Edited by: ShyamKumar Nidugala Keshava

Publication details
- History: 2017-present
- Publisher: Thieme Medical Publishers on behalf of the Indian Society of Vascular and Interventional Radiology (India)
- Frequency: Triannual
- Open access: Yes
- License: CC BY-NC-ND 4.0

Standard abbreviations
- ISO 4: J. Clin. Interv. Radiol.

Indexing
- ISSN: 2456-4869
- OCLC no.: 1148095644

Links
- Journal homepage; Online access

The Journal of Clinical Interventional Radiology is a triannual open-access peer-reviewed medical journal covering all aspects of vascular and non-vascular interventional radiology. It is published by Thieme Medical Publishers on behalf of the Indian Society of Vascular and Interventional Radiology. It was established in 2017 and the editor-in-chief is Naveen Kalra (Postgraduate Institute of Medical Education and Research, Chandigarh), who was preceded by Shyamkumar Nidugala Keshava.

== Abstracting and indexing ==
The journal is abstracted and indexed in Embase and Scopus.
