= Cutaneous and Ocular Toxicology =

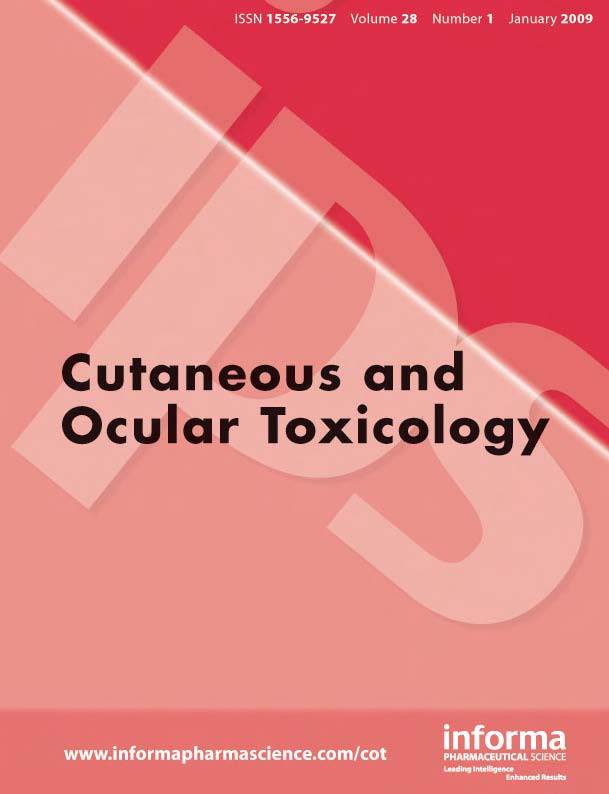
- Discipline: Toxicology
- Language: English
- Edited by: A. Wallace Hayes

Publication details
- Former name(s): Journal of Toxicology: Cutaneous and Ocular Toxicology
- History: 1982-present
- Publisher: Taylor and Francis Group
- Frequency: Quarterly
- Impact factor: 1.122 (2014)

Standard abbreviations
- ISO 4: Cutan. Ocul. Toxicol.

Indexing
- CODEN: JTOTDO
- ISSN: 1556-9527 (print); 1556-9535 (web)
- LCCN: 2005214969
- OCLC no.: 60615104

Links
- Journal homepage; Online access; Online

Cutaneous and Ocular Toxicology is an international, peer-reviewed medical journal that covers all types of harm to skin and eyes. It is published by Taylor and Francis Group. Topics covered include pharmaceutical and medical products; consumer, personal care, and household products; and issues in environmental and occupational exposures. The editor-in-chief is A. Wallace Hayes, Harvard School of Public Health.

According to ISI it received an impact factor of 1.122 as reported in the 2014 Journal Citation Reports by Thomson Reuters, ranking it 43rd out of 57 journals in the category "Ophthalmology" and ranking it 75th out of 87 journals in the category "Toxicology".
