= Zeitschrift für Gerontologie und Geriatrie =

- Discipline: Gerontology, geriatrics
- Language: German

Publication details
- Former name: Zeitschrift für Gerontologie
- History: 1968-present
- Publisher: Springer Science+Business Media
- Frequency: 8/year
- Open access: Hybrid
- Impact factor: 1.160 (2017)

Standard abbreviations
- ISO 4: Z. Gerontol. Geriatr.

Indexing
- ISSN: 0948-6704 (print); 1435-1269 (web)
- LCCN: 96652113
- OCLC no.: 628794636
- Zeitschrift für Gerontologie
- ISSN: 0044-281X

Links
- Journal homepage; Online archive

The Zeitschrift für Gerontologie und Geriatrie (English: Journal for Gerontology and Geriatrics) is a peer-reviewed medical journal covering gerontology and geriatrics. It is published 8 times a year in German by Springer Science+Business Media. The journal was established in 1968 as the Zeitschrift für Gerontologie, obtaining its current title in 1995.

== Abstracting and indexing ==
The journal is abstracted and indexed in:

- Biological Abstracts
- BIOSIS Previews
- Current Contents/Clinical Medicine
- Current Contents/Social & Behavioral Sciences
- EBSCO databases
- Embase
- Index Medicus/MEDLINE/PubMed
- International Bibliography of Book Reviews of Scholarly Literature and Social Sciences
- International Bibliography of Periodical Literature
- ProQuest databases
- PsycINFO
- Science Citation Index Expanded
- Scopus
- Social Sciences Citation Index

According to the Journal Citation Reports, the journal has a 2017 impact factor of 1.160.
