= Internal Medicine Journal =

- Discipline: Internal medicine
- Language: English
- Edited by: Jeff Szer

Publication details
- History: 1952-present
- Publisher: Wiley
- Frequency: Monthly
- Open access: Hybrid
- Impact factor: 2.1 (2022)

Standard abbreviations
- ISO 4: Intern. Med. J.

Indexing
- CODEN: IMJNAK
- ISSN: 1444-0903 (print); 1445-5994 (web)
- OCLC no.: 478227843

Links
- Journal homepage; Online access; Online archive

Internal Medicine Journal is a monthly peer-reviewed medical journal covering internal medicine. It is published by Wiley and was established in 1952. The editor-in-chief is Jeff Szer (University of Melbourne).

== Abstracting and indexing ==
The journal is abstracted and indexed in:

- CAB Abstracts
- Chemical Abstracts Service
- CINAHL
- Current Contents/Clinical Medicine
- Current Contents/Life Sciences
- EBSCO databases
- Embase
- Index Medicus/MEDLINE/PubMed
- Science Citation Index Expanded
- Scopus

According to the Journal Citation Reports, the journal has a 2022 impact factor of 2.1.
