= Orbit (journal) =

- Discipline: Ophthalmology
- Language: English
- Edited by: Richard C. Allen MD PhD FACS

Publication details
- History: 1982-present
- Publisher: Taylor & Francis
- Frequency: Quarterly
- Impact factor: 0.8

Standard abbreviations
- ISO 4: Orbit

Indexing
- ISSN: 0167-6830 (print); 1744-5108 (web)
- OCLC no.: 750676070

Links
- Journal homepage; Online access; Online archive

Orbit, the International Journal on Orbital Disorders, Oculoplastic and Lacrimal Surgery is a bimonthly peer-reviewed medical journal covering orbital disorders including: ophthalmology, plastic surgery, dermatology, maxillofacial surgery, otolaryngology, endocrinology, radiology, oncology, neurology, neurosurgery, pathology, and immunology. The journal was established in 1980 when Gabe Bleeker, Chairman of the Board of the International Society for Orbital Disorders, came to an agreement with the Aeolus Press Publishing Company and became the first editor-in-chief. The journal is now published by Taylor & Francis and over the years is or has been the official journal of several organizations including the European Society of Ophthalmic Plastic and Reconstructive Surgery, the British Oculoplastic Surgery Society, and the Italian Society of Oculoplastic Surgery. Editors have included Leo Koornneef, Maarten Mourits, and Dion Paridaens. The current Editor-in-Chief is Richard C. Allen, who is also an elected board member of the Society of Eye Journal Editors (www.oculosurg.com).
