= Expert Review of Respiratory Medicine =

- Discipline: Pulmonology
- Language: English

Publication details
- History: 2007-present
- Publisher: Taylor & Francis
- Frequency: Bimonthly
- Impact factor: 2.432 (2016)

Standard abbreviations
- ISO 4: Expert Rev. Respir. Med.

Indexing
- ISSN: 1747-6348 (print); 1747-6356 (web)
- LCCN: 2007243540
- OCLC no.: 173162164

Links
- Journal homepage; Online access; Online archive

Expert Review of Respiratory Medicine is a bimonthly peer-reviewed medical journal covering pulmonology. It was established in 2007 and is published by Taylor & Francis. According to the Journal Citation Reports, the journal has a 2016 impact factor of 2.432.
