= Journal of the Peripheral Nervous System =

Quarterly academic journal

- Subject: Peripheral nervous system
- Language: English
- Edited by: Giuseppe Lauria

Publication details
- History: 1996–present
- Publisher: John Wiley & Sons
- Frequency: Quarterly
- Impact factor: 3.494 (2020)

Standard abbreviations
- ISO 4: J. Peripher. Nerv. Syst.

Indexing
- CODEN: JPNSFO
- ISSN: 1085-9489 (print); 1529-8027 (web)
- LCCN: sv97019446
- OCLC no.: 299335496

Links
- Journal homepage; Online access; Online archive

The Journal of the Peripheral Nervous System is a quarterly peer-reviewed scientific journal covering the study of the peripheral nervous system from the perspectives of both neuroscience and clinical neurology. It was established in 1996 and is published by John Wiley & Sons on behalf of the Peripheral Nerve Society, of which it is the official journal. The editor-in-chief is Giuseppe Lauria. According to the Journal Citation Reports, the journal has a 2020 impact factor of 3.494, ranking it 93rd out of 208 journals in the category "Clinical Neurology" and 148th out of 273 journals in the category "Neurosciences".
