= Innate Immunity (journal) =

- Discipline: Immunology
- Language: English
- Edited by: Otto Holst

Publication details
- Former name: Journal of Endotoxin Research
- History: 1994-present
- Publisher: SAGE Publications on behalf of the International Endotoxin & Innate Immunity Society
- Frequency: Bimonthly
- Impact factor: 2.682 (2012)

Standard abbreviations
- ISO 4: Innate Immun.

Indexing
- CODEN: IINMCB
- ISSN: 1753-4259 (print); 1753-4267 (web)
- LCCN: 2008233328
- OCLC no.: 226438859

Links
- Journal homepage; Online access; Online archive

Innate Immunity is a peer-reviewed scientific journal covering innate immunity in humans, animals, and plants. It is published by SAGE Publications on behalf of the International Endotoxin & Innate Immunity Society and the editor-in-chief is Otto Holst (Research Centre Borstel, Germany). The journal was established in 1994 as the Journal of Endotoxin Research and obtained its current title in 2006.

== Abstracting and indexing ==
The journal is abstracted and indexed in MEDLINE, Scopus, and the Science Citation Index Expanded. According to the Journal Citation Reports, the journal has a 2012 impact factor of 2.682.
