= Annals of Physical and Rehabilitation Medicine =

- Discipline: Physical medicine and rehabilitation
- Language: English
- Edited by: D. Pérennou

Publication details
- Former name(s): Annales de Réadaptation et de Médecine Physique
- History: 1982-present
- Publisher: Elsevier on behalf of the French Society of Rehabilitation (France)
- Frequency: Bimonthly

Standard abbreviations
- ISO 4: Ann. Phys. Rehabil. Med.

Indexing
- ISSN: 1877-0657 (print); 1877-0665 (web)

Links
- Journal homepage; Online archive; Online archive of the Annales de Réadaptation et de Médecine Physique

Annals of Physical and Rehabilitation Medicine is a bimonthly, peer-reviewed medical journal covering physical medicine and rehabilitation. Published by Elsevier on behalf of the French Society of Rehabilitation (Société française de médecine physique et de réadaptation), it was established in 1982 as Annales de Réadaptation et de Médecine Physique and acquired its current name in 2009.

== Abstracting and indexing ==
The journal is abstracted and indexed in Index Medicus/MEDLINE/PubMed.
