= American Journal of Alzheimer's Disease & Other Dementias =

- Language: English
- Edited by: Carol F. Lippa, MD

Publication details
- Former name: American Journal of Alzheimer's Disease
- History: 1986-present
- Publisher: SAGE Publications
- Frequency: Monthly
- Impact factor: 1.774 (2010)

Standard abbreviations
- ISO 4: Am. J. Alzheimer's Dis. Other Dement.
- NLM: Am J Alzheimers Dis Other Demen

Indexing
- ISSN: 1533-3175
- LCCN: 2001211522
- OCLC no.: 71196303

Links
- Journal homepage; Online access; Online archive

The American Journal of Alzheimer's Disease & Other Dementias is a peer-reviewed academic journal that publishes papers in the field of neurology. The journal's editor is Carol F. Lippa, MD (Drexel University College of Medicine). It has been in publication since 1986 and is currently published by SAGE Publications.

== Scope ==
The American Journal of Alzheimer's Disease & Other Dementias is aimed primarily at professionals on the frontline of Alzheimer's care, dementia and clinical depression and other specialists who manage patients with dementias and their families. The journal aims to provide practical information about medical, psychiatric and nursing issues.

== Abstracting and indexing ==
The American Journal of Alzheimer's Disease & Other Dementias is abstracted and indexed in, among other databases: SCOPUS, and the Social Sciences Citation Index. According to the Journal Citation Reports, its 2010 impact factor is 1.774, ranking it 104 out of 185 journals in the category 'Clinical Neurology'. and 27 out of 45 journals in the category 'Geriatrics & Gerontology'.
