= Hand Therapy =

- Discipline: Physical medicine and rehabilitation
- Language: English
- Edited by: Christina Jerosch-Herold

Publication details
- Former name: The British Journal of Hand Therapy
- History: 1991–present
- Publisher: SAGE Publications on behalf of the British Association of Hand Therapists and the European Federation of Societies for Hand Therapy
- Frequency: Quarterly

Standard abbreviations
- ISO 4: Hand Ther.

Indexing
- ISSN: 1758-9983 (print); 1758-9991 (web)
- OCLC no.: 570804106

Links
- Journal homepage; Online access; Online archive

Hand Therapy is a quarterly peer-reviewed academic journal covering the field of physical medicine and rehabilitation, especially physiotherapy and occupational therapy for the hand. The editor-in-chief is Tara Packham (McMaster University). It was established in 1991 and is published by SAGE Publications in association with the British Association of Hand Therapists and the European Federation of Societies for Hand Therapy.

== Abstracting and indexing ==
The journal is abstracted and indexed in Scopus.
