= Molecular Neurodegeneration =

- Language: English
- Edited by: Guojun Bu, Huaxi Xu

Publication details
- History: 2006-present
- Publisher: BioMed Central
- Frequency: Upon acceptance
- Open access: Yes
- License: Creative Commons Attribution License 4.0
- Impact factor: 18.879 (2021)

Standard abbreviations
- ISO 4: Mol. Neurodegener.

Indexing
- CODEN: MNOEAZ
- ISSN: 1750-1326
- OCLC no.: 863075252

Links
- Journal homepage; Online access

Molecular Neurodegeneration is a peer-reviewed scientific journal covering research on the molecular mechanisms underlying neurodegeneration, especially as pertaining to neurodegenerative diseases. The journal was established in 2006 and is published by BioMed Central. The editors-in-chief are Guojun Bu (Mayo Clinic) and Huaxi Xu (Sanford-Burnham Medical Research Institute). It is the official journal of the BrightFocus Foundation.

== Abstracting and indexing ==
The journal is abstracted and indexed in:

- Biological Abstracts
- BIOSIS
- Chemical Abstracts Service
- Embase
- EMBiology
- MEDLINE/PubMed
- PsycINFO
- Science Citation Index Expanded
- Scopus

According to the Journal Citation Reports, the journal has a 2021 impact factor of 18.879.
