= Journal of Cardiovascular Translational Research =

- Discipline: Cardiology
- Language: English
- Edited by: Jennifer L. Hall

Publication details
- History: 2008-present
- Publisher: Springer Science+Business Media
- Frequency: Bimonthly
- Impact factor: 4.132 (2020)

Standard abbreviations
- ISO 4: J. Cardiovasc. Transl. Res.

Indexing
- ISSN: 1937-5387 (print); 1937-5395 (web)
- LCCN: 2007212612
- OCLC no.: 163609845

Links
- Journal homepage; Online access

The Journal of Cardiovascular Translational Research is a peer-reviewed medical journal covering all areas of cardiology. It is published by Springer Science+Business Media on behalf of the International Society for Cardiovascular Translational Research. It was established in 2008 and the editor-in-chief is Enrique Lara-Pezzi, CNIC, Madrid, Spain.

== Abstracting and indexing ==
The journal is abstracted and indexed in:

- Science Citation Index Expanded
- PubMed/Medline
- Scopus
- EMBASE
- Academic OneFile
- Biological Abstracts
- BIOSIS Previews

According to the Journal Citation Reports, the journal has a 2016 impact factor of 2.319.
