= Clinical Colorectal Cancer =

- Discipline: Oncology
- Language: English
- Edited by: Edward Chu

Publication details
- History: 2001-present
- Publisher: Elsevier (United States)
- Frequency: quarterly
- Impact factor: 2.813 (2014)

Standard abbreviations
- ISO 4: Clin. Colorectal Cancer

Indexing
- ISSN: 1533-0028

Links
- Journal homepage

Clinical Colorectal Cancer is a peer-reviewed medical journal published by CIG Media Group (Cancer Information Group) from 2001 to 2010 and by Elsevier since 2011. It publishes original articles describing various aspects of clinical and translational research of gastrointestinal cancers. The journal is devoted to articles on detection, diagnosis, prevention, and treatment of colorectal, pancreatic, liver, and other gastrointestinal cancers. The main emphasis is on recent scientific developments in all areas related to gastrointestinal cancers. Specific areas of interest include clinical research and mechanistic approaches; drug sensitivity and resistance; gene and antisense therapy; pathology, markers, and prognostic indicators; chemoprevention strategies; multimodality therapy; and integration of various approaches.

== Abstracting and indexing ==
Clinical Colorectal Cancer is indexed in Index Medicus/PubMed, EMBASE Excerpta Medica, ISI Current Contents, CINAHL (Cumulative Index to Nursing and Allied Health Literature), Chemical Abstracts, and Journal Citation Reports.

== Article types ==
The journal publishes editorials, original research papers, comprehensive reviews, current treatment reports, case reports, brief communications, current trials, translational medicine pieces, and a "Meeting Highlights" section.
