= Research in Sports Medicine =

- Discipline: Sports medicine
- Language: English
- Edited by: Youlian Hong & Lars R. McNaughton

Publication details
- Former names: Sports Medicine, Training and Rehabilitation
- History: 1988-present
- Publisher: Routledge
- Frequency: Quarterly
- Impact factor: 1.871 (2017)

Standard abbreviations
- ISO 4: Res. Sports Med.

Indexing
- ISSN: 1543-8627 (print); 1543-8635 (web)
- LCCN: 2003214685
- OCLC no.: 863248874

Links
- Journal homepage; Online access; Online archive

Research in Sports Medicine is a quarterly peer-reviewed medical journal covering sports medicine. It was established in 1988 as Sports Medicine, Training and Rehabilitation, obtaining its current title in 2003. The journal is published by Routledge and the editors-in-chief are Youlian Hong (Chengdu Sports University) and Lars R. McNaughton.

== Abstracting and indexing ==
The journal is abstracted and indexed in:

- CAB Abstracts
- CINAHL
- EBSCO databases
- Embase
- Index Medicus/MEDLINE/PubMed
- Science Citation Index Expanded
- Scopus

According to the Journal Citation Reports, the journal has a 2017 impact factor of 1.871.
