= The Journal of Medical Practice Management =

- Discipline: Management
- Language: English
- Edited by: Jennifer LaGreca

Publication details
- History: 1984-present
- Publisher: Greenbranch Publishing
- Frequency: Bimonthly

Standard abbreviations
- ISO 4: J. Med. Pract. Manag.

Indexing
- ISSN: 8755-0229
- OCLC no.: 11248524

Links
- Journal homepage

The Journal of Medical Practice Management is a medical journal published by Greenbranch Publishing. It is abstracted and indexed in MEDLINE, BIOSIS, Embase/Excerpta Medica, and Hospital Literature Index. The journal was established in 1984 and is published by Greenbranch Publishing.
