= Clinical Case Studies =

- Discipline: Psychiatry
- Language: English
- Edited by: Daniel L. Segal

Publication details
- History: 2002-present
- Publisher: SAGE Publications
- Frequency: Bimonthly
- Impact factor: 0.742 (2017)

Standard abbreviations
- ISO 4: Clin. Case Stud.

Indexing
- ISSN: 1534-6501 (print); 1552-3802 (web)
- LCCN: 2001214140
- OCLC no.: 315034216

Links
- Journal homepage; Online access; Online archive

Clinical Case Studies is a bimonthly peer-reviewed medical journal that covers the field of psychotherapy, including individual, couples, and family therapy.

The editor-in-chief is Daniel L. Segal, from University of Colorado, Colorado Springs. It was established in 2002 and is published by SAGE Publications.

== Abstracting and indexing ==
The journal is abstracted and indexed in:

- Current Contents/Social and Behavioral Sciences
- Embase/Excerpta Medica
- Psychological Abstracts/PsycINFO
- Scopus
- Social Sciences Citation Index

According to the Journal Citation Reports, the journal has a 2017 impact factor of 0.742.
