= Zdoroviye =

Health magazine

Zdoroviye (Russian: Здоровье; literally "Health") is a health magazine published in the Soviet Union and then, in Russia.

== History and profile ==
Founded in 1955, Zdoroviye had a circulation of 12,600,000 copies in 1986. It was published monthly in Moscow by the Pravda Publishing House as a joint edition of the USSR and the RSFSR Ministries of Public Health, and covered popular scientific; medicine and hygiene. Its chief editor was M. Piradov.
