= Journal of Musculoskeletal Pain =

- Discipline: Myalgia, bone pain
- Language: English

Publication details
- History: 1993-2018
- Publisher: Informa Healthcare
- Frequency: Quarterly
- Impact factor: 0.406 (2010)

Standard abbreviations
- ISO 4: J. Musculoskelet. Pain

Indexing
- CODEN: JMPAEQ
- ISSN: 2470-8593 (print); 2470-8607 (web)
- LCCN: 93648861
- OCLC no.: 24243628

Links
- Journal homepage; Online access; Online archive

MYOPAIN: A journal of myofascial pain and fibromyalgia was a quarterly peer-reviewed medical journal covering research on chronic muscle and bone pain, including fibromyalgia, myofascial pain, and other types of musculoskeletal pain. It was published by Informa Healthcare. The journal was established in 1993 as The Journal of Musculoskeletal Pain and renamed in 2015. It ceased publication in 2018.
