= Acta Orthopaedica et Traumatologica Turcica =

- Discipline: Orthopaedic surgery
- Language: English

Publication details
- History: 1962–present
- Publisher: Turkish Association of Orthopaedics and Traumatology (Turkey)
- Frequency: Bimonthly
- Impact factor: 1.557 (2021)

Standard abbreviations
- ISO 4: Acta Orthop. Traumatol. Turc.

Indexing
- ISSN: 1017-995X
- LCCN: 2003243029

Links
- Journal homepage

Acta Orthopaedica et Traumatologica Turcica is a peer-reviewed medical journal published bi-monthly by the Turkish Association of Orthopaedics and Traumatology. It is also the official journal of the Turkish Society of Orthopaedics and Traumatology. The journal is included in the Science Citation Index Expanded, Index Medicus, and TUBITAK-ULAKBIM.

== History ==
Acta Orthopaedica et Traumatologica Turcica was established in 1962 and published semi-annually until 1974 after which publication was quarterly. The journal has been published 6 times a year since 1988. Articles have been peer-reviewed since 1991.

== Scope ==
The journal publishes articles pertaining to diagnostic, treatment, and prevention methods as well as studies in basic sciences related to orthopedics and traumatology. Article types published are:

- Clinical and research articles
- Case reports
- Personal clinical and technical experiences that merit originality
- Brief reports of original studies or evaluations
- Book reviews
- Domestic and foreign article abstracts, data submitted at conferences
