= Neuro-Ophthalmology (journal) =

- Discipline: Ophthalmology
- Language: English
- Edited by: Gordon Plant, Walter Jay

Publication details
- History: 1980–present
- Publisher: Lippincott Williams & Wilkins (United States)
- Frequency: Quarterly
- Impact factor: 2.9 (2022)

Standard abbreviations
- ISO 4: Neuro-Ophthalmol.

Indexing
- ISSN: 0165-8107 (print); 1744-506X (web)

Links
- Journal homepage

Neuro-Ophthalmology is an English language, peer-reviewed medical journal that covers diagnostic methods in neuro-ophthalmology such as visual fields, CT scanning and electrophysiology, the visual system such as the retina, oculomotor system, pupil, neuro-ophthalmic aspects of the orbit, and related fields such as migraine and ocular manifestations of neurological diseases.

== Editors ==
The Editors-in-Chief of Neuro-Ophthalmology are Gordon Plant (National Hospital for Neurology and Neurosurgery, London, UK) and Walter Jay (Loyola University Medical Center).
