= Perspectives in Vascular Surgery and Endovascular Therapy =

- Discipline: Angiology
- Language: English
- Edited by: Peter Gloviczki

Publication details
- History: 1988-2013
- Publisher: SAGE Publications
- Frequency: Quarterly

Standard abbreviations
- ISO 4: Perspect. Vasc. Surg. Endovasc. Ther.

Indexing
- ISSN: 1531-0035
- OCLC no.: 44641133

Links
- Journal homepage; Online access; Online archive

Perspectives in Vascular Surgery and Endovascular Therapy was a quarterly peer-reviewed medical journal that covered research in the field of angiology. Its editor-in-chief was Peter Gloviczki (Mayo Medical School). It was established in 1988 and was published by SAGE Publications until December 2013.

== Abstracting and indexing ==
Perspectives in Vascular Surgery and Endovascular Therapy is abstracted and indexed in CINAHL and MEDLINE.
