= Journal of Geriatric Cardiology =

- Discipline: Gerontology, cardiovascular medicine
- Language: English
- Edited by: Hai-Yun Wu

Publication details
- History: 2004-present
- Publisher: Science Press
- Frequency: Quarterly
- Open access: Yes
- License: Creative Commons Attribution-NonCommercial-ShareAlike 3.0 Unported
- Impact factor: 3.327 (2020)

Standard abbreviations
- ISO 4: J. Geriatr. Cardiol.

Indexing
- CODEN: JGCOBQ
- ISSN: 1671-5411
- OCLC no.: 168254677

Links
- Journal homepage; Online archive

The Journal of Geriatric Cardiology is a quarterly peer-reviewed open-access medical journal published by Science Press. The journal covers all aspects of cardiovascular disease in elderly people, especially those with concomitant diseases of other major organ-systems. The founding editor-in-chief was Shi-Wen Wang. The current editor is Hai-Yun Wu.

== Abstracting and indexing ==
The journal is abstracted and indexed in the Science Citation Index Expanded, PubMed Central, Scopus, and Embase. According to the Journal Citation Reports, the journal has a 2013 impact factor of 1.056.
