= Acta Médica Portuguesa =

- Language: English
- Edited by: Rui Tato Marinho

Publication details
- History: 1979–present
- Publisher: Portuguese Medical Association on behalf of the Portuguese Order of Physicians
- Frequency: Bimonthly
- Open access: Yes
- License: CC-BY-NC-ND

Standard abbreviations
- ISO 4: Acta Méd. Port.
- NLM: Acta Med Port

Indexing
- ISSN: 0870-399X (print); 1646-0758 (web)

Links
- Journal homepage

Acta Médica Portuguesa is a peer-reviewed medical journal covering all aspects of medicine that is published by the Portuguese Medical Association on behalf of the Portuguese Order of Physicians. Types of articles published include: original research, reviews, publishing, and medical imaging perspective. It is an open access journal published under a Creative Commons licence (BY-NC-ND).

== History ==
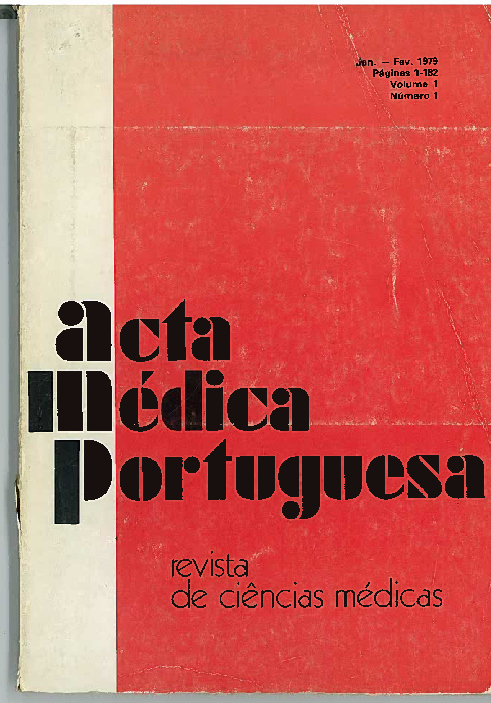
Cover of the first issue - 1979

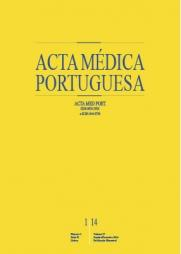
Edição 2014

Acta Médica Portuguesa was established in February 1979. In 1987, the journal was acquired by the Southern Regional Section of the Portuguese Order of Physicians. In March 1989, it became the official journal of the Order of Physicians. Since 2004, the journal has been available only in digital format.

== Editors ==
The following persons have been editors-in-chief of the journal:

- A. Galvão-Teles (1979–1987)
- F. Veiga Fernandes (1987–1993)
- A. Sales Luís (1993–1996)
- Carlos Ribeiro (1996–1998)
- J. Germano de Sousa (1999–2004)
- Pedro Nunes (2005–2010)
- Rui Tato Marinho (2011–present)

== Abstracting and indexing ==
Acta Médica Portuguesa is abstracted and indexed in:

- PubMed/Medline
- Science Citation Index Expanded
- Chemical Abstracts
- EMBASE
- SafetyLit

According to the Journal Citation Reports, the journal has a 2011 impact factor of 0.256, ranking it 145th out of 153 journals in the category "Medicine, General and Internal".
