= Seminars in Thrombosis and Hemostasis =

- Discipline: Hematology
- Language: English
- Edited by: Emmanuel J. Favaloro

Publication details
- History: 1974–present
- Publisher: Thieme Medical Publishers
- Frequency: 8 issues/year
- Impact factor: 3.401 (2018)

Standard abbreviations
- ISO 4: Semin. Thromb. Hemost.

Indexing
- CODEN: STHMBV
- ISSN: 0094-6176 (print); 1098-9064 (web)
- OCLC no.: 909454588

Links
- Journal homepage; Online access

Seminars in Thrombosis and Hemostasis is a peer-reviewed medical review journal covering hematology, with a specific focus on disorders related to thrombosis and hemostasis. It was established in 1974 and is published eight times per year by Thieme Medical Publishers. The editor-in-chief is Emmanuel J. Favaloro. According to the Journal Citation Reports, the journal has a 2018 impact factor of 3.401.
