= Acta Medica Mediterranea =

- Discipline: Medicine
- Language: English
- Edited by: Alberto Notarbartolo, Pasquale Mansueto

Publication details
- History: 1985-present
- Publisher: Editore Carbone
- Frequency: Bimonthly
- Open access: Yes
- Impact factor: 0.220 (2021)

Standard abbreviations
- ISO 4: Acta Med. Mediterr.

Indexing
- ISSN: 0393-6384 (print); 2283-9720 (web)
- OCLC no.: 848529074

Links
- Journal homepage; Online archive

Acta Medica Mediterranea is a bimonthly peer-reviewed open-access medical journal. It was established in 1985 and is published by Editore Carbone. The editors-in-chief are Alberto Notarbartolo and Pasquale Mansueto.

== Abstracting and indexing ==
The journal is abstracted and indexed in Embase, Science Citation Index Expanded, and Scopus. According to the Journal Citation Reports, the journal has a 2021 impact factor of 0.220.

== Citation stacking ==
In 2017 and 2018, the journal retracted at least 17 articles for citation stacking. Three editorial board members were fired in connection to this matter.
