= Personalized Medicine (journal) =

- Discipline: Personalized medicine
- Language: English

Publication details
- History: 2004–present
- Publisher: Future Medicine Ltd
- Frequency: Bimonthly
- Impact factor: 1.010 (2016)

Standard abbreviations
- ISO 4: Pers. Med.

Indexing
- CODEN: PMEECD
- ISSN: 1741-0541 (print); 1744-828X (web)
- OCLC no.: 57682058

Links
- Journal homepage

Personalized Medicine is a bimonthly peer-reviewed medical journal covering personalized medicine. It was established in 2004 and is published by Future Medicine.

== Abstracting and indexing ==
The journal is indexed by Chemical Abstracts, Current Contents/Clinical Medicine, Embase/Excerpta Medica, Science Citation Index Expanded, and Scopus. According to the Journal Citation Reports, the journal has a 2016 impact factor of 3.0 in the 2023 Journal Citation Reports™ released by Clarivate in June 2024. Journal of Personalized Medicine ranks Q1 (58 among 325 titles) in the “Medicine, General & Internal” category and Q2 (51 among 174 titles) in the “Health Care Sciences & Services” category. It had an IF of 3.63 in 2025.
