= European Journal of Medical Research =

- Discipline: Medicine
- Language: English
- Edited by: Adrian J.L. Clark

Publication details
- History: 1995-present
- Publisher: BioMed Central
- Frequency: Monthly
- Open access: Yes
- Impact factor: 4.8 (2025)

Standard abbreviations
- ISO 4: Eur. J. Med. Res.

Indexing
- CODEN: EJMRFL
- ISSN: 0949-2321 (print); 2047-783X (web)
- OCLC no.: 231679301

Links
- Journal homepage

The European Journal of Medical Research is a peer-reviewed medical journal. Established as a print journal published by Holzapfel Verlag in 1995, it was relaunched in 2012 as an open-access online-only format by BioMed Central.
