= Seminars in Ophthalmology =

- Discipline: Ophthalmology
- Language: English
- Edited by: Mohsen Bahmani Kashkouli

Publication details
- History: 1986-present
- Publisher: Taylor & Francis (United States)
- Frequency: Bimonthly
- Impact factor: 3.1 (2025)

Standard abbreviations
- ISO 4: Semin. Ophthalmol.

Indexing
- ISSN: 0882-0538 (print); 1744-5205 (web)

Links
- Journal homepage

Seminars in Ophthalmology is a peer-reviewed medical journal which publishes clinically oriented reviews on the diagnosis and treatment of ophthalmic disorders. Each issue focuses on a single topic, with a primary emphasis on appropriate surgical techniques.

The journal is indexed in Scopus, PubMed/MEDLINE, EMBASE, Web of Science, EBSCOhost, and OCLC.

== Editor ==
The editor in chief of Seminars in Ophthalmology is Professor Mohsen Kashkouli MD of the Department of Ophthalmology, University of Louisville.
