= Journal of Infection in Developing Countries =

- Discipline: Biomedical
- Language: English

Publication details
- History: 2006-present
- Frequency: Monthly
- Open access: Yes
- License: Creative Commons Attribution 3.0 License
- Impact factor: 1.4 (2023)

Standard abbreviations
- ISO 4: J. Infect. Dev. Ctries.

Indexing
- ISSN: 2036-6590 (print); 1972-2680 (web)
- LCCN: 2009243355
- OCLC no.: 609712762

Links
- Journal homepage; Online access; Online archive

The Journal of Infection in Developing Countries is a monthly peer-reviewed open-access medical journal that covers research on infectious diseases, especially in developing countries. Researchers from these countries are offered mentoring by the editorial board, a special committee, and staff. The journal is abstracted and indexed by Scopus and the Science Citation Index Expanded and has a 2023 impact factor of 1.4 according to the Journal Citation Reports.

The editor-in-chief is Salvatore Rubino (University of Sassari).
