= Diabetes and Vascular Disease Research =

- Discipline: endocrinology
- Language: English
- Edited by: Peter Grant

Publication details
- History: –2004–present
- Publisher: SAGE Publications (United Kingdom)
- Frequency: Bi-Monthly
- Impact factor: 2.468 (2010)

Standard abbreviations
- ISO 4: Diabetes Vasc. Dis. Res.
- NLM: Diab Vasc Dis Res

Indexing
- ISSN: 1479-1641 (print); 1752-8984 (web)
- LCCN: 2005243431
- OCLC no.: 317944981

Links
- Journal homepage; Online access; Online archive

Diabetes and Vascular Disease Research is a peer-reviewed academic journal that publishes papers in the field of Peripheral vascular disease. The journal's editor is Peter Grant (University of Leeds). It has been in publication since 2004 and is currently published by SAGE Publications.

== Abstracting and indexing ==
Diabetes and Vascular Disease Research is abstracted and indexed in, among other databases: SCOPUS, and the Social Sciences Citation Index. According to the Journal Citation Reports, its 2010 impact factor is 2.468, ranking it 27 out of 66 journals in the category "Peripheral Vascular Disease" and 66 out of 116 journals in the category "Endocrinology & Metabolism".
