= Expert Opinion on Drug Safety =

- Discipline: Pharmacovigilance
- Language: English
- Edited by: Roger McIntyre

Publication details
- History: 2002-present
- Publisher: Informa
- Frequency: Monthly
- Impact factor: 4.011 (2021)

Standard abbreviations
- ISO 4: Expert Opin. Drug Saf.

Indexing
- CODEN: EODSA9
- ISSN: 1474-0338 (print); 1744-764X (web)
- OCLC no.: 858598983

Links
- Journal homepage; Online access; Online archive

Expert Opinion on Drug Safety is an international peer-reviewed medical journal publishing review articles on all aspects of pharmacovigilance and original papers on the clinical implications of drug treatment safety issues. It was established in 2002 and is published by Informa. The editor-in-chief is Roger McIntyre (University of Toronto).

== Abstracting and indexing ==
The journal is abstracted and indexed in Chemical Abstracts, EMBASE/Excerpta Medica, Index Medicus/MEDLINE, and the Science Citation Index Expanded. According to the Journal Citation Reports, the journal has a 2021 impact factor of 4.011.
