= Expert Opinion on Emerging Drugs =

- Discipline: Pharmacology
- Language: English
- Edited by: Claire Attwood

Publication details
- Former name(s): Emerging Drugs
- History: 1996–present
- Publisher: Informa
- Frequency: Quarterly
- Impact factor: 3.912 (2021)

Standard abbreviations
- ISO 4: Expert Opin. Emerg. Drugs

Indexing
- ISSN: 1472-8214 (print); 1744-7623 (web)

Links
- Journal homepage

Expert Opinion on Emerging Drugs is a quarterly peer-reviewed medical journal publishing structured reviews on drugs/drug classes emerging onto the market across all therapy areas. Each review includes an "expert opinion" section, in which authors are asked to provide their personal view on the current status and future direction of the research discussed. It was established as Emerging Drugs in 1996, changing to its current name in 2001. It is published by Taylor & Francis. In 2021 the journal stated that it had an impact factor of 3.912.
