= Neurochirurgie =

- Discipline: Neurosurgery
- Language: English, French
- Edited by: Pierre-Hugues Roche

Publication details
- History: 1955-present
- Publisher: Elsevier
- Frequency: Bimonthly
- Impact factor: 0.702 (2017)

Standard abbreviations
- ISO 4: Neurochirurgie

Indexing
- ISSN: 0028-3770
- OCLC no.: 1021288451

Links
- Journal homepage; Online access; Online archive

Neurochirurgie is a bimonthly peer-reviewed medical journal covering all aspects of neurosurgery. It was established in 1955 and is published by Elsevier. The editor-in-chief is Pierre-Hugues Roche (Aix-Marseille University). It is an official journal of the Société de Neurochirurgie de Langue Française and the Société Française de Neurochirurgie.

== Abstracting and indexing ==
The journal is abstracted and indexed in:

- Current Contents/Clinical Medicine
- Embase
- Index Medicus/MEDLINE/PubMed
- PASCAL
- Science Citation Index Expanded
- Scopus

According to the Journal Citation Reports, the journal has a 2017 impact factor of 0.702.
