= Geriatric Orthopaedic Surgery & Rehabilitation =

- Discipline: Orthopedics
- Language: English
- Edited by: Stephen L. Kates

Publication details
- History: 2010-present
- Publisher: SAGE Publications
- Frequency: Bimonthly
- Impact factor: (2010)

Standard abbreviations
- ISO 4: Geriatr. Orthop. Surg. Rehabil.

Indexing
- ISSN: 2151-4585
- OCLC no.: 457771293

Links
- Journal homepage; Online access; Online archive

Geriatric Orthopaedic Surgery & Rehabilitation is a bimonthly peer-reviewed medical journal that covers the field of Orthopedics. The journal's editor-in-chief is Stephen L. Kates (University of Rochester Medical Center). It has been in publication since 2010 and is currently published by SAGE Publications.
