= Tehran University Medical Journal =

- Discipline: Medicine
- Language: Persian (abstracts in English)
- Edited by: Nadereh Behtash

Publication details
- History: 1942–present
- Publisher: Tehran University of Medical Sciences (Iran)
- Frequency: Quarterly
- Open access: Yes
- License: CC BY-NC 4.0

Standard abbreviations
- ISO 4: Tehran Univ. Med. J.

Indexing
- CODEN: MDPACS
- ISSN: 1683-1764 (print); 1735-7322 (web)
- LCCN: 2007243311
- OCLC no.: 1000358152

Links
- Journal homepage; Online access; Online archive

The Tehran University Medical Journal (Persian: مجلۀ دانشکدۀ پزشکى.) is a quarterly peer-reviewed medical journal published by the Tehran University of Medical Sciences. The editor-in-chief is Nadereh Behtash (Tehran University of Medical Sciences). It was established in 1942 as the first medical journal published in Iran.

== Abstracting and indexing ==
The journal is abstracted and indexed in:

- CAB Abstracts
- Directory of Open Access Journals
- EBSCO databases
- Embase
- Scopus
