= Journal of Children's Orthopaedics =

- Discipline: Orthopaedics
- Language: English
- Edited by: Fritz Hefti; Shlomo Wientroub

Publication details
- History: 2007-present
- Frequency: Bimonthly
- Impact factor: 1.075 (2019)

Standard abbreviations
- ISO 4: J. Child.'s Orthop.

Indexing
- ISSN: 1863-2521 (print); 1863-2548 (web)

Links
- Journal homepage; Current issue; Editorial board

The Journal of Children's Orthopaedics is a bimonthly peer-reviewed medical journal, which was first published in March 2007. It is the official journal of the European Paediatric Orthopaedic Society (EPOS). The Journal of Children's Orthopaedics is a gold open access journal and hence articles published in the journal are available online to anyone, free of charge. Full-text content can also be accessed via PubMed Central.

== Abstracting and indexing ==
The journal is indexed in Scopus, the Emerging Sources Citation Index (via Web of Science) and also PubMed Central, which hosts full-text content of the complete archive.

According to the Journal Citation Reports, it has a 2019 impact factor of 1.075.
