= Korean Journal of Anesthesiology =

- Discipline: Anesthesiology
- Language: English
- Edited by: Young Lan Kwak

Publication details
- History: 1968-present
- Publisher: Korean Society of Anesthesiologists (Korea)
- Frequency: Bimonthly
- Open access: Yes
- License: Creative Commons Attribution-NC

Standard abbreviations
- ISO 4: Korean J. Anesthesiol.

Indexing
- ISSN: 2005-6419 (print); 2005-7563 (web)
- OCLC no.: 650157939

Links
- Journal homepage; Online archive

The Korean Journal of Anesthesiology (KJA) is a bimonthly peer-reviewed open access medical journal covering all aspects of anesthesiology. It was established in 1968 and is published by the Korean Society of Anesthesiologists (KSA) of which it is an official journal. The journal is abstracted and indexed by PubMed Central, Scopus, Embase, and Chemical Abstracts Service. It has been indexed in Sources Citation Index Expanded (SCIE) by the Clarivate Analytics (Formerly, Thomson Reuters). The editor-in-chief is Younsuk Lee (Dongguk University).

== Brief history ==
In 1968, The KSA founded the `Daehan-machuigwa-hakhoiji' (the prototype of the KJA written in Korean). They conceived the idea of fostering sustainable research and education in this country through a society-driven journal.

The KJA has become an open access journal as a member of the Synapse (A Digital Archive and Reference Linking Platform of Korean Medical Journals) since 2009. It then adopted a new line of editing policy including English-only submission.

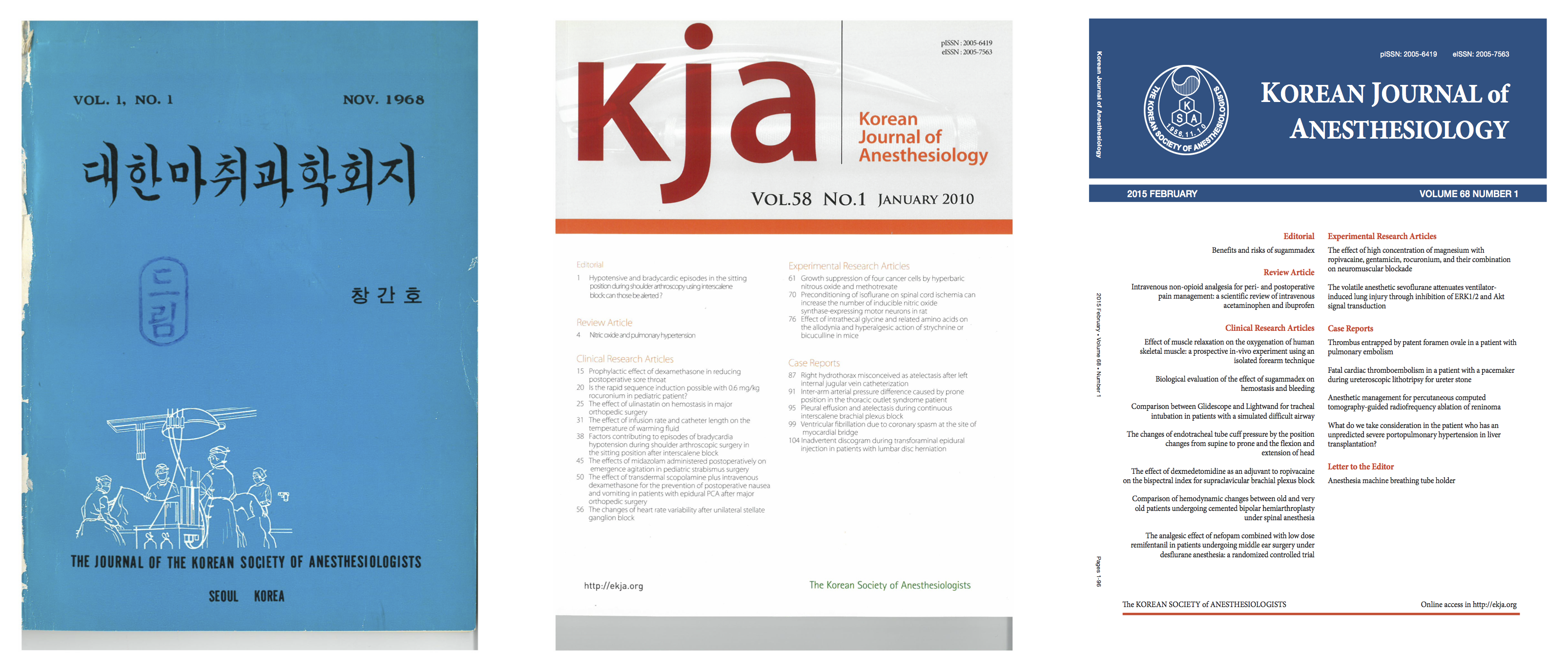
Historical cover faces of the Korean Journal of Anesthesiology

== Review and Publication Efficiency ==
Journal speed recorded 8 days (rejection) and < 30 days (first decision for ongoing review). Average time to acceptance recorded 66 days in 2016.

== Online First ==
The KJA commenced online first publication since June 22, 2016.
