= Reviews in Endocrine and Metabolic Disorders =

Medical review journal

- Discipline: Endocrinology
- Language: English
- Edited by: Felipe F. Casanueva

Publication details
- History: 2000–present
- Publisher: Springer Science+Business Media
- Frequency: Quarterly
- Impact factor: 9.306 (2021)

Standard abbreviations
- ISO 4: Rev. Endocr. Metab. Disord.

Indexing
- CODEN: REMDCG
- ISSN: 1389-9155 (print); 1573-2606 (web)
- OCLC no.: 299338864

Links
- Journal homepage; Online archive

Reviews in Endocrine and Metabolic Disorders is a quarterly peer-reviewed medical review journal covering endocrinology and metabolism. It was established in 2000 with Derek LeRoith as the founding editor-in-chief. It is published by Springer Science+Business Media and the editor-in-chief is Felipe F. Casanueva (University of Santiago de Compostela). According to the Journal Citation Reports, the journal has a 2021 impact factor of 9.306.
