= British Journal of Diabetes and Vascular Disease =

- Discipline: Cardiovascular Medicine
- Language: English
- Edited by: Clifford J Bailey, Ian Campbell, Christoph Schindler

Publication details
- History: 2001 -present
- Publisher: SAGE Publications
- Frequency: Bi-monthly
- Impact factor: (2010)

Standard abbreviations
- ISO 4: Br. J. Diabetes Vasc. Dis.

Indexing
- ISSN: 1753-4305
- OCLC no.: 644571489

Links
- Journal homepage; Online access; Online archive

The British Journal of Diabetes and Vascular Disease is a peer-reviewed academic journal that publishes papers six times a year in the field of Cardiovascular medicine. The journal's editors are Clifford J Bailey (Aston University), Ian Campbell (Victoria Hospital) and Christoph Schindler (Dresden University of Technology). It has been in publication since 2001 and is currently published by SAGE Publications.

== Scope ==
The British Journal of Diabetes and Vascular Disease disseminates topical and practical information to the diabetes care team. The journal is primarily aimed at scientists, endocrinologists and vascular surgeons, publishing specialist reviews, research articles and original papers.

== Abstracting and indexing ==
The British Journal of Diabetes and Vascular Disease is abstracted and indexed in the following databases:

- EMBASE
- SCOPUS
- ZETOC
