= Clinical Pharmacology: Advances and Applications =

- Discipline: Pharmacology
- Language: English
- Edited by: Arthur E. Frankel

Publication details
- History: 2010-present
- Publisher: Dove Medical Press
- Frequency: Upon acceptance

Standard abbreviations
- ISO 4: Clin. Pharmacol.

Indexing
- ISSN: 1179-1438
- OCLC no.: 695367721

Links
- Journal homepage

Clinical Pharmacology: Advances and Applications is a peer-reviewed medical journal covering research in pharmacology, clinical trials, drugs and drug safety. The journal was established in 2010 and is published by Dove Medical Press.
