= Turkish Journal of Surgery =

- Discipline: Surgery
- Language: English
- Edited by: Kaya Saribeyoğlu

Publication details
- Former name(s): Ulusal Cerrahi Dergisi
- History: 1991–present
- Publisher: Bilimsel Tip Publishing House (Turkey)
- Frequency: Quarterly
- Open access: Yes
- License: CC BY-NC

Standard abbreviations
- ISO 4: Turk. J. Surg.

Indexing
- ISSN: 2564-6850 (print); 2564-7032 (web)
- OCLC no.: 1117855046
- Ulusal Cerrahi Dergisi
- ISSN: 1300-0705

Links
- Journal homepage; Online access; Online archive

The Turkish Journal of Surgery is a quarterly peer-reviewed open-access medical journal covering all aspects of surgery. It is an official journal of the Turkish Surgical Society and was established in 1991 as Ulusal Cerrahi Dergisi, obtaining its current title in 2017. The editor-in-chief is Kaya Saribeyoğlu.

== Abstracting and indexing ==
The journal is abstracted and indexed in Emerging Sources Citation Index, EBSCO databases, and Scopus.
