= Hand Surgery (journal) =

- Discipline: Surgery
- Language: English

Publication details
- Publisher: World Scientific (Singapore)

Standard abbreviations
- ISO 4: Hand Surg.

Indexing
- ISSN: 0218-8104 (print); 1793-6535 (web)

Links
- Journal homepage

Hand Surgery is a journal on "injury and disease of the hand and upper limb and related research", with an Asia-Pacific perspective. It has been published by World Scientific since 1996 and includes articles on surgical technique, case reports, and information regarding meetings and education programmes.

== Abstracting and indexing ==
The journal is abstracted in Index Medicus, PubMed, and CSA Calcium and Calcified Tissues Abstracts.
