= Onkologia i Radioterapia =

- Discipline: Oncology, radiology
- Language: English
- Edited by: Ludmila Grzybowska-Szatkowska

Publication details
- History: 2007–present
- Publisher: Medical Project Poland (Poland)
- Frequency: Monthly
- Open access: Yes

Standard abbreviations
- ISO 4: Onkol. Radioter.

Indexing
- ISSN: 1896-8961
- OCLC no.: 712778471

Links
- Journal homepage; Online access; Online archive

Onkologia i Radioterapia (English: Oncology and Radiotherapy) is a monthly peer-reviewed open-access medical journal covering oncology and radiology published by Medical Project Poland. The editor-in-chief is Ludmila Grzybowska-Szatkowska (Medical University of Lublin). The journal was established in 2007 and is an official journal of the Polish Oncological Society, Polish Oncology Radiotherapy Society, and the Oncology Orthopedics Section of the Polish Orthopedic and Traumatological Society.

== Abstracting and indexing ==
The journal is abstracted and indexed in Embase and Scopus.
