= Journal of Neurotherapy =

- Discipline: Psychiatry and neurology
- Language: English
- Edited by: Randall R. Lyle and Martijn Arns

Publication details
- History: 1995–2013
- Publisher: Routledge/Taylor and Francis
- Frequency: Quarterly

Standard abbreviations
- ISO 4: J. Neurother.

Indexing
- CODEN: JNOEA2
- ISSN: 1087-4208 (print); 1530-017X (web)
- LCCN: sv96004123
- OCLC no.: 34309324

Links
- Journal homepage; Online archive

The Journal of Neurotherapy: Investigations in Neuromodulation, Neurofeedback and Applied Neuroscience was a scientific journal for the study and application of neuromodulation and neurofeedback. On December 4, 2013, in volume 17, issue 4, the editor announced that no more issues would be published. It was published quarterly by Taylor & Francis. The journal provided a multidisciplinary perspective on research, treatment, and public policy for neurotherapy. It is indexed by PsycINFO, Excerpta Medica, Scopus, and Ulrichs.

The founding editor for this journal was David Trudeau in 1995.
