= Journal of Pediatric Endocrinology and Metabolism =

- Discipline: Pediatric endocrinology
- Language: English
- Edited by: Zvi Zadik

Publication details
- History: 1985-present
- Publisher: Walter de Gruyter
- Frequency: Monthly

Standard abbreviations
- ISO 4: J. Pediatr. Endocrinol. Metab.

Indexing
- ISSN: 2191-0251
- OCLC no.: 707373512

Links
- Journal homepage

The Journal of Pediatric Endocrinology and Metabolism is a peer-reviewed medical journal covering pediatric endocrinology and published by Walter de Gruyter. The editor-in-chief is Zvi Zadik (Hebrew University of Jerusalem).
