= Acta Neurologica Belgica =

Neurological journal

- Discipline: Neurology
- Language: English
- Edited by: Patrick Cras

Publication details
- History: 1901-present
- Publisher: Springer Science+Business Media
- Frequency: Quarterly
- Impact factor: 2.396 (2020)

Standard abbreviations
- ISO 4: Acta Neurol. Belg.

Indexing
- CODEN: ANUBBR
- ISSN: 0300-9009 (print); 2240-2993 (web)
- OCLC no.: 610316658

Links
- Journal homepage; Online access; Journal page at publisher's website

Acta Neurologica Belgica is a quarterly peer-reviewed medical journal covering neurology. It was established in 1901 and is published by Springer Science+Business Media. It is an official journal of a number of Belgian medical societies (Belgian Neurological Society, Belgian Society for Neuroscience, Belgian Society of Clinical Neurophysiology, Belgian Pediatric Neurology Society, Belgian Study Group of Multiple Sclerosis, Belgian Stroke Council, Belgian Headache Society, Belgian Study Group of Neuropathology). The editor-in-chief is Patrick Cras (University of Antwerp, Belgium).

== Abstracting and indexing ==
The journal is abstracted and indexed in:

- Science Citation Index Expanded
- Index medicus/MEDLINE/PubMed
- Scopus
- PsycINFO
- Embase
- Current Contents/Clinical Medicine
- GeoRef
- INIS Atomindex

According to the Journal Citation Reports, the journal has a 2020 impact factor of 2.396.
