= Le Praticien en Anesthésie Réanimation =

- Discipline: Anaesthesiology
- Language: French
- Edited by: Francis Bonnet, Muriel Fartoukh

Publication details
- History: 1997-present
- Publisher: Elsevier Masson (France)
- Frequency: Bimonthly

Standard abbreviations
- ISO 4: Prat. Anesth. Réanim.

Indexing
- ISSN: 1279-7960
- OCLC no.: 473304222

Links
- Journal homepage; Online access

Le Praticien en Anesthésie Réanimation (translated title: The Anaesthesia and Intensive Care Practitioner) is a French peer-reviewed medical journal covering anaesthesiology. It was established in 1997 and is published by Elsevier Masson. The editors-in-chief are Francis Bonnet and Muriel Fartoukh. The journal is abstracted and indexed in Embase/Excerpta Medica.
