= Expert Opinion on Drug Metabolism & Toxicology =

- Discipline: Pharmacology, toxicology
- Language: English

Publication details
- History: 2005-present
- Publisher: Taylor and Francis Group
- Frequency: Monthly
- Impact factor: 3.4 (2024)

Standard abbreviations
- ISO 4: Expert Opin. Drug Metab. Toxicol.

Indexing
- CODEN: EODMBQ
- ISSN: 1742-5255 (print); 1744-7607 (web)
- OCLC no.: 57377939

Links
- Journal homepage; Online access; Online archive

Expert Opinion on Drug Metabolism & Toxicology is a monthly peer-reviewed medical journal publishing review articles on ADME-Tox. It was established in 2005 and is published by Taylor and Francis. The editor-in-chief is Luis Valerio (Food and Drug Administration).

== Abstracting and indexing ==
The journal is abstracted and indexed in Index Medicus/MEDLINE/PubMed, Science Citation Index Expanded, Biochemistry & Biophysics Citation Index, and EMBASE/Excerpta Medica. According to the Journal Citation Reports, the journal has a 2014 impact factor of 2.831.
