= The International Journal of Lower Extremity Wounds =

- Discipline: Medical Sciences
- Language: English
- Edited by: Raj Mani, PhD, FACA

Publication details
- History: 2010 -present
- Publisher: SAGE Publications
- Frequency: Quarterly
- Impact factor: 2.057 (2021)

Standard abbreviations
- ISO 4: Int. J. Low. Extrem. Wounds

Indexing
- ISSN: 1534-7346
- OCLC no.: 475161518

Links
- Journal homepage; Online access; Online archive

The International Journal of Lower Extremity Wounds is a peer-reviewed academic journal that publishes papers four times a year in the field of Medical Sciences. The journal's editor is Raj Mani, PhD, FACA (Southampton University Hospital). It has been in publication since 2010 and is currently published by SAGE Publications.

== Scope ==
The International Journal of Lower Extremity Wounds publishes original research, reviews of evidence-based diagnostic techniques and methods and surgical and medical therapeutics for wounds such as burns, ulcers and fistulas. The journal also focuses on areas such as assessment and monitoring tools, casting and bioengineered skin. The International Journal of Lower Extremity Wounds is interdisciplinary and aims to appeal to a wide audience of those involved in the treatment and research of lower extremity wounds.

== Abstracting and indexing ==
The International Journal of Lower Extremity Wounds is abstracted and indexed in the following databases:

- CINAHL
- EMBASE
- MEDLINE
- SafetyLit
- SCOPUS
