= The Journal of Rural Health =

- Discipline: Rural health
- Language: English
- Edited by: Tyrone Borders

Publication details
- Former name(s): American Journal of Rural Health
- History: 1981–present
- Publisher: Wiley-Blackwell
- Frequency: Quarterly
- Impact factor: 5.667 (2021)

Standard abbreviations
- ISO 4: J. Rural Health

Indexing
- ISSN: 0890-765X (print); 1748-0361 (web)

Links
- Journal homepage; Online access; Online archive

The Journal of Rural Health is a quarterly peer-reviewed medical journal covering rural health. It was established in 1981 as the American Journal of Rural Health, obtaining its current name in 1985. It is published by Wiley-Blackwell on behalf of the National Rural Health Association. The editor-in-chief is Tyrone Borders (University of Kentucky). According to the Journal Citation Reports, the journal has a 2021 impact factor of 5.667, ranking it 15/109 in Health Care Sciences & Services journals, 6/88 in Health Policy & Services journals, 49/210 in Public, Environmental & Occupational Health journals, and 27/183 in Public, Environmental & Occupational Health (Social Science) journals.
