= TAF Preventive Medicine Bulletin =

- Discipline: Preventive medicine
- Language: English, Turkish

Publication details
- History: 2001–present
- Publisher: Gülhane Askeri Tip Akademisi (Gülhane Military Medical Academy) (Turkey)
- Frequency: Bimonthly
- Open access: Yes
- License: Creative Commons

Standard abbreviations
- ISO 4: TAF Prev. Med. Bull.

Indexing
- ISSN: 1303-734X
- Online archive

TAF Preventive Medicine Bulletin is a bimonthly peer-reviewed medical journal covering primary medical services and preventive medicine. It was established in 2001. From 2011 to 2016 it was abstracted and indexed in Scopus.
