= Physical & Occupational Therapy in Pediatrics =

- Discipline: peer-reviewed rapid publication medical journal
- Language: English

Publication details
- Publisher: Informa (Britain / United States)

Standard abbreviations
- ISO 4: Phys. Occup. Ther. Pediatr.

Indexing
- ISSN: 1541-3144

Links
- Journal homepage

Physical & Occupational Therapy in Pediatrics is a medical journal that provides information to all therapists involved in developmental and physical rehabilitation of infants, children and youth. Designed for PT and OT pediatric professionals in hospitals, rehabilitation centers, schools, and health and human services agencies, the journal provides clinical research and practical applications. Current clinical advances and research findings are important for all therapists, and each issue of this journal brings therapists the latest discoveries in therapy as related to their work with children. With an emphasis on implications and applications for therapy practice, the journal includes case reports, and reviews/critiques of new measures.

Physical & Occupational Therapy in Pediatrics is published by Informa Pharmaceutical Science, a division of Informa plc. The journal is edited by Robert J. Palisano, Drexel University, USA and Annette Majnemer, McGill University, Canada.

Physical & Occupational Therapy in Pediatrics has been published since 1981. The journal is available online and in paper format. It is published four times a year

== Issue contents ==
Examples of published items include:

- Editorials and commentaries (a forum in which the editors, editorial board members and invited therapists present perspectives on important issues)
- Original research reports
- Evidence to practice commentary featuring additional perspectives from an expert in the field on a particular issue raised in one of the articles
- Perspectives, theories and models for practice.
- Systematic reviews of research for a focused clinical question
- Appraisal of new tests and measures
- Book Reviews of the latest publications in the area of pediatric therapy
- Case reports and program evaluations
