= Expert Review of Clinical Pharmacology =

- Discipline: Clinical pharmacology
- Language: English
- Edited by: Mary Yianni

Publication details
- History: 2008-present
- Publisher: Informa
- Frequency: Monthly
- Impact factor: 3.481 (2019)

Standard abbreviations
- ISO 4: Expert Rev. Clin. Pharmacol.

Indexing
- CODEN: ERCPAG
- ISSN: 1751-2433 (print); 1751-2441 (web)
- OCLC no.: 192040039

Links
- Journal homepage; Online access; Online archive

Expert Review of Clinical Pharmacology is a monthly peer-reviewed medical journal covering all aspects of clinical pharmacology published by Taylor & Francis.

== Background ==
The journal is abstracted and indexed in Chemical Abstracts, EMBASE/Excerpta Medica, MEDLINE/Index Medicus/PubMed, and Scopus. Content focuses on all aspects of clinical pharmacology and accepts both original scholarship as well as reviews. The journal has a rigorous peer-review process. The journal publishes most of the time almost instantly upon acceptance with a normal turnaround time of 72 hours. The current commissioning editor is Jermaine Wilcock.
