= Alimentary Pharmacology & Therapeutics =

- Discipline: Gastroenterology, pharmacology
- Language: English

Publication details
- History: 1987-present
- Publisher: Wiley-Blackwell
- Frequency: Bimonthly
- Impact factor: 7.731 (2018)

Standard abbreviations
- ISO 4: Aliment. Pharmacol. Ther.

Indexing
- ISSN: 1365-2036
- OCLC no.: 45622622

Links
- Journal homepage

Alimentary Pharmacology & Therapeutics is a bimonthly peer-reviewed medical journal concerned with the effects of drugs on the human gastrointestinal and hepato-biliary systems, particularly with relevance to clinical practice. The journal publishes original papers concerned with all aspects of basic and clinical pharmacology, pharmacokinetics, and the therapeutic use of drugs in the alimentary tract including the liver, gall bladder, and pancreas. Its editors are J. M. Rhodes and C. W. Howden.
