= Clinical Lung Cancer =

- Discipline: Oncology
- Language: English
- Edited by: Antoinette Wozniak, MD

Publication details
- History: 1999–present
- Publisher: Elsevier
- Impact factor: 4.2 (2017)

Standard abbreviations
- ISO 4: Clin. Lung Cancer

Indexing
- ISSN: 1525-7304

Links
- Journal homepage

Clinical Lung Cancer is a peer-reviewed medical journal that has been published by Elsevier since 2011. It was established by the CIG Media Group in 1999.

== History ==
Clinical Lung Cancer is indexed in Index Medicus/PubMed, EMBASE (Excerpta Medica), Current Contents/Clinical Medicine, Science Citation Index Expanded, CINAHL, and Chemical Abstracts. It is published six times annually.

== Scope ==
Clinical Lung Cancer publishes articles on detection, diagnosis, prevention, and treatment of lung cancer. The emphasis is on recent scientific developments in all areas related to lung cancer.

Areas of interest include clinical research and mechanistic approaches; drug sensitivity and resistance; gene and antisense therapy; pathology, markers, and prognostic indicators; chemoprevention strategies; multimodality therapy; and integration of various approaches.

The journal publishes editorials, original research papers, comprehensive reviews, current treatment reports, case reports, brief communications, current trials, translational medicine pieces, and a "Meeting Highlights" section.

== Editor in chief ==
The editor-in-chief is David R. Gandara. He is a member of the board of directors of the International Association for the Study of Lung Cancer and the Addario Foundation. He served as a member of the board of directors of the American Society of Clinical Oncology (ASCO) and as secretary-treasurer. Gandara is a member of professional committees, including the NCI Investigational Drug Steering Committee and the NCI Science Correlates Committee.

He is the Chair of the Southwest Oncology Group's Lung Committee (SWOG). Gandara has published more than 225 articles and 10 book chapters. Gandara holds a BA from the University of Texas and an MD with honors from the University of Texas Medical Branch.
