= Expert Opinion on Medical Diagnostics =

- Discipline: Medical diagnostics
- Language: English

Publication details
- History: 2007–2013
- Publisher: Informa
- Frequency: Bimonthly

Standard abbreviations
- ISO 4: Expert Opin. Med. Diagn.

Indexing
- ISSN: 1753-0059 (print); 1753-0067 (web)

Links
- Journal homepage; Online archive

Expert Opinion on Medical Diagnostics was a peer-reviewed medical journal publishing review articles on all aspects of medical diagnostics for early disease diagnosis, therapy selection, patient recruitment into clinical trials, predicting predisposition to disease, and information for the design of new treatments. Each review included an "expert opinion" section, in which authors were asked to provide their personal view on the current status and future direction of the research discussed. The journal was published by Informa from 2007 to 2013. It was abstracted and indexed in Index medicus/MEDLINE/PubMed.
