= Allergy, Asthma & Immunology Research =

Medical journal

- Discipline: Immunology
- Language: English
- Edited by: Hae-Sim Park

Publication details
- History: 2009–present
- Publisher: Korean Academy of Asthma, Allergy and Clinical Immunology; Korean Academy of Pediatric Allergy and Respiratory Disease
- Frequency: Bimonthly
- Open access: Yes
- Impact factor: 5.026 (2018)

Standard abbreviations
- ISO 4: Allergy Asthma Immunol. Res.

Indexing
- ISSN: 2092-7355 (print); 2092-7363 (web)
- OCLC no.: 1064355435

Links
- Journal homepage; Online access; Online archive

Allergy, Asthma & Immunology Research is a bimonthly peer-reviewed open access medical journal covering immunology. It was established in 2009 and is published by the Korean Academy of Asthma, Allergy and Clinical Immunology and the Korean Academy of Pediatric Allergy and Respiratory Disease; it is an official journal of both societies. The editor-in-chief is Hae-Sim Park (Ajou University). According to the Journal Citation Reports, the journal has a 2018 impact factor of 5.026.
