= Child: Care, Health and Development =

- Discipline: Developmental psychology, pediatrics
- Language: English
- Edited by: Stuart Logan

Publication details
- Former name: Ambulatory Child Health
- History: 1975-present
- Publisher: Wiley-Blackwell on behalf of the British Association of Community Child Health, the Swiss Paediatric Society, and the European Society for Social Pediatrics
- Frequency: Bimonthly
- Impact factor: 1.201 (2011)

Standard abbreviations
- ISO 4: Child: Care Health Dev.

Indexing
- CODEN: CCHDDH
- ISSN: 0305-1862 (print); 1365-2214 (web)
- LCCN: 2007205010
- OCLC no.: 260171769

Links
- Journal homepage; Online access; Online archive

Child: Care, Health and Development is a bimonthly peer-reviewed public health journal published by Wiley-Blackwell on behalf of the British Association of Community Child Health, the Swiss Paediatric Society, and the European Society for Social Pediatrics. The journal was established in 1975 and covers child health issues such as childhood illness, health care, paediatrics, and social work.

According to the Journal Citation Reports, the journal has a 2011 impact factor of 1.201, ranking it 45th out of 68 journals in the category "Psychology Developmental" and 70th out of 115 in the category "Pediatrics".
