= Infectious Diseases (journal) =

- Discipline: Infectious disease
- Language: English
- Edited by: Ragnar Norrby

Publication details
- Former name: Scandinavian Journal of Infectious Diseases
- History: 1969–present
- Publisher: Informa Healthcare (UK)
- Frequency: Monthly
- Open access: no
- Impact factor: 1.47 (2015)

Standard abbreviations
- ISO 4: Infect. Dis.

Indexing
- CODEN: SJIDB7
- ISSN: 0036-5548 (print); 1651-1980 (web)
- LCCN: 80011540

Links
- Journal homepage; NLM Catalog - NCBI

Infectious Diseases (formerly Scandinavian Journal of Infectious Diseases) is a peer-reviewed medical journal publishing original research and review articles on clinical and microbiological aspects of infectious diseases.

== Core topics ==
- clinical aspects of infectious diseases
- laboratory investigations of clinical significance (bacteriological, virological, parasitological, mycological, immunological, pathological, physiological, chemical and pharmacological)
- epidemiological and epizootological studies of human infections
- experimental infections

== Publisher ==
Infectious Diseases is published by Informa Healthcare, a trading division in Informa plc, a United Kingdom-based publisher.

== Editor-in-Chief ==
The current editor in chief is Ragnar Norrby. He is chairman of the Board of Trustees of the International Vaccine Institute and was the Director-General of the Swedish Institute for Infectious Disease Control (SMI) until June 2009. He has also acted as chairman of the Swedish Society of Medicine and served as Professor at Lund University between 1988 and 2000.
