= Scandinavian Journal of Surgery =

- Discipline: Surgery
- Language: English
- Edited by: Paulina Salminen

Publication details
- History: 1919-present
- Publisher: SAGE Publications
- Frequency: Quarterly
- Impact factor: 2.1 (2025)

Standard abbreviations
- ISO 4: Scand. J. Surg.

Indexing
- ISSN: 1457-4969 (print); 1799-7267 (web)
- OCLC no.: 252872852

Links
- Journal homepage; Online access; Online archive

Scandinavian Journal of Surgery is a peer-reviewed academic journal that publishes papers in the field of surgery and orthopaedics. The journal's editor-in-chief is professor Paulina Salminen (Turku University Hospital, Finland). It has been in publication since 1919 and is currently published by SAGE Publications on behalf of the Finnish Surgical Society.

== Abstracting and indexing ==
Scandinavian Journal of Surgery is abstracted and indexed in, among other databases: SCOPUS, and the Social Sciences Citation Index. According to the Journal Citation Reports, its 2025 impact factor is 2.1, ranking it 128 out of 321 journals in the category ‘Surgery’.
