= Journal of Applied Toxicology =

- Discipline: Toxicology
- Language: English
- Edited by: Philip W. Harvey

Publication details
- History: 1981–present
- Publisher: John Wiley & Sons
- Frequency: monthly
- Impact factor: 3.446 (2020)

Standard abbreviations
- ISO 4: J. Appl. Toxicol.

Indexing
- CODEN: JJATDK
- ISSN: 0260-437X (print); 1099-1263 (web)
- LCCN: 83644016
- OCLC no.: 07567999

Links
- Journal homepage; Online access; Online archive

The Journal of Applied Toxicology is a monthly peer-reviewed scientific journal published since 1981 by John Wiley & Sons. It covers all aspects of toxicology and publishes reviews and research articles on mechanistic, fundamental, and applied research relating to the toxicity of drugs and chemicals at the molecular, cellular, tissue, target organ, and whole body level, both in vivo (by all routes of exposure) and in vitro/ex vivo.

The current editor-in-chief is Philip W. Harvey (Covance Laboratories).

== Most cited papers ==
The journal's three most-cited papers (>130 citations) are:

1. 'Review of oximes available for treatment of nerve agent poisoning', Volume 14, Issue 5, Sep-Oct 1994, Pages: 317–331, Dawson RM
2. 'Chronic effects on the respiratory-tract of hamsters, mice and rats after long-term inhalation of high-concentrations of filtered and unfiltered diesel-engine emissions', Volume 6, Issue 6, Dec 1986, Pages: 383–395, Heinrich U, Muhle H and Takenaka S, et al.
3. 'Development of a reconstituted water medium and preliminary validation of the Frog Embryo Teratogenesis Assay Xenopus (FETAX)', Volume 7, Issue 4, Aug 1987, Pages: 237–244, Dawson DA and Bantle JA

== Abstracting and indexing ==
The Journal of Applied Toxicology is abstracted and indexed in Chemical Abstracts Service, Scopus, and the Science Citation Index Expanded. The 2020 impact factor is 3.446. It is ranked 27th out of 87 journals in the category "Toxicology".
