= Indian Pacing and Electrophysiology Journal =

- Discipline: Cardiology
- Language: English

Standard abbreviations
- ISO 4: Indian Pacing Electrophysiol. J.

Indexing
- ISSN: 0972-6292

Links
- Journal homepage

The Indian Pacing and Electrophysiology Journal (IPEJ), ISSN 0972-6292, is a peer reviewed online journal devoted to cardiac pacing and electrophysiology. Manuscript submission and peer review are entirely through electronic media to minimize delay in publication. Initially it was a quarterly publication. Currently it is a bimonthly publication. The Uniform Requirements for Manuscripts Submitted to Biomedical Journals are followed.

IPEJ is a unique open access journal which charges neither reader nor the author. The journal is being maintained by the voluntary effort of medical professionals in the field interested in maintaining free access to academic publications. Full text of the journal is being archived at PubMed Central, the free full text online archive of the US National Library of Medicine.

The journal is indexed by Embase and PubMed, and Scopus, and has been published regularly since 2001.
