= Current Pain and Headache Reports =

- Discipline: Anesthesiology
- Language: English
- Edited by: Stephen D. Silberstein, Lawrence C. Newman, Alan David Kaye

Publication details
- Former name(s): Current Review of Pain
- History: 1994–president
- Publisher: Springer Science+Business Media
- Frequency: Bimonthly
- Impact factor: 2.767 (2018)

Standard abbreviations
- ISO 4: Curr. Pain Headache Rep.

Indexing
- ISSN: 1531-3433 (print); 1534-3081 (web)
- LCCN: 2002213183
- OCLC no.: 49393136

Links
- Journal homepage; Online archive

Current Pain and Headache Reports is a bimonthly peer-reviewed medical journal publishing review articles in the field of anesthesiology. It was established in 1994 as Current Review of Pain, obtaining its current name in 2001. It is published by Springer Science+Business Media and the editors-in-chief are Stephen D. Silberstein, MD (Thomas Jefferson University) and Lawrence C. Newman, MD, (NYU Langone Medical Center). According to the Journal Citation Reports, the journal has a 2018 impact factor of 2.767.
