= Expert Opinion on Therapeutic Patents =

- Discipline: Therapeutics, patents
- Language: English
- Edited by: Claudiu T. Supuran

Publication details
- Former name: Current Opinion on Therapeutic Patents
- History: 1991–present
- Publisher: Informa
- Frequency: Monthly
- Impact factor: 4.297 (2014)

Standard abbreviations
- ISO 4: Expert Opin. Ther. Pat.

Indexing
- CODEN: EOTPEG
- ISSN: 1354-3776 (print); 1744-7674 (web)
- OCLC no.: 858598995

Links
- Journal homepage; Online access; Online archive

Expert Opinion on Therapeutic Patents is a monthly peer-reviewed medical journal covering pharmaceutical patent information across all therapy areas. Each review includes an "expert opinion" section, in which authors provide their personal view on the current status and future direction of the research discussed. The journal was established as Current Opinion on Therapeutic Patents in 1991, and changed to the current name in 1994. It is published by Informa. The editor-in-chief is Claudiu T. Supuran (University of Florence).

== Abstracting and indexing ==
The journal is abstracted and indexed in Chemical Abstracts Service, Current Contents/Life Sciences, EMBASE/Excerpta Medica, Index Medicus/Medline/PubMed, and the Science Citation Index Expanded. According to the Journal Citation Reports, the journal has a 2014 impact factor of 4.297.
