= British Journal of Medical Practitioners =

- Discipline: Medicine
- Language: English
- Edited by: Javed Latoo, Nadeem Mazi-Kotwal

Publication details
- History: 2008-present
- Publisher: JMN Medical Education (United Kingdom)
- Frequency: Quarterly
- Open access: Yes

Standard abbreviations
- ISO 4: Br. J. Med. Pract.

Indexing
- CODEN: BJMPBC
- ISSN: 1757-8515
- OCLC no.: 863089458

Links
- Journal homepage; Online access; Online archive

The British Journal of Medical Practitioners is a quarterly peer-reviewed online medical journal published by JMN Medical Education. It covers all branches of medicine. The journal is abstracted and indexed in Scopus, Embase, CAB Abstracts, EBSCO databases, Global Health, and Chemical Abstracts Service. The editors-in-chief are Javed Latoo and Nadeem Mazi-Kotwal.
