= Journal of Asthma =

- Discipline: Pulmonology
- Language: English
- Edited by: Fulvio Braido

Publication details
- History: 1963-present
- Publisher: Informa Healthcare
- Frequency: 10/year
- Impact factor: 1.9 (2022)

Standard abbreviations
- ISO 4: J. Asthma

Indexing
- ISSN: 0277-0903 (print); 1532-4303 (web)

Links
- Journal homepage; Online access; Online archive

The Journal of Asthma is a peer-reviewed medical journal that covers asthma and related conditions. The editor-in-chief is Fulvio Braido (University of Genoa).
