= Clinical Ovarian Cancer & Other Gynecologic Malignancies =

Academic journal

- Discipline: Oncology
- Language: English
- Edited by: J. Tate Thigpen

Publication details
- Former name: Clinical Ovarian Cancer
- History: 2008-2016
- Publisher: Elsevier
- Frequency: Biannually

Standard abbreviations
- ISO 4: Clin. Ovarian Cancer Other Gynecol. Malig.

Indexing
- ISSN: 1941-4390 (print); 1941-4404 (web)
- LCCN: 2008213030
- OCLC no.: 192095794

Links
- Journal homepage; Online access

Clinical Ovarian Cancer & Other Gynecologic Malignancies was a peer-reviewed medical journal published by Elsevier. It covered research on the detection, diagnosis, prevention, and treatment of ovarian cancer. Specific areas of interest included clinical research and mechanistic approaches, drug sensitivity and resistance, gene and antisense therapy, pathology, markers, and prognostic indicators, chemoprevention strategies, multimodality therapy, and integration of various approaches. It was replaced by Clinical Ovarian and other Gynecologic Cancer, which was discontinued in 2016.

== Abstracting and indexing ==
The journal was abstracted and indexed in CINAHL, EMBASE, and Chemical Abstracts.

== Article types ==
The journal published editorials, original research papers, reviews, current treatment reports, case reports, brief communications, current trials, translational medicine pieces, and a "Meeting Highlights" section.
