= Nano Biomedicine and Engineering =

Chinese scientific journal

- Discipline: Nanotechnology, biology, medicine, engineering
- Language: English
- Edited by: Daxiang Cui

Publication details
- History: 2009–present
- Publisher: KeAi Communications Co. Ltd. (China)
- Frequency: Quarterly
- Open access: Yes
- License: CC BY

Standard abbreviations
- ISO 4: Nano Biomed. Eng.

Indexing
- CODEN: NBEAA2
- ISSN: 2150-5578
- OCLC no.: 429899861

Links
- Journal homepage

Nano Biomedicine and Engineering is a quarterly peer-reviewed open-access scientific journal that was established in 2009 covering nanotechnology applied to biology, medicine, and engineering. It partners with Shanghai Jiao Tong University and is academically supported by China Anti-cancer Association Nano-oncology Committee. The editor-in-chief is Daxiang Cui (Shanghai Jiao Tong University). The journal publishes basic, clinical, and engineering research articles, reviews, conference proceedings, editorials, and communications.

== Abstracting and indexing ==
The journal is abstracted and indexed in the Ei Compendex, Directory of Open Access Journals, EBSCO databases, Embase, and Scopus.
