= Evolution, Medicine, and Public Health =

- Discipline: Evolutionary medicine
- Language: English
- Edited by: Cynthia Beall

Publication details
- History: 2013–present
- Publisher: Oxford University Press on behalf of the International Society for Evolution, Medicine, and Public Health
- Open access: Yes
- Impact factor: 5.425 (2021)

Standard abbreviations
- ISO 4: Evol. Med. Public Health

Indexing
- ISSN: 2050-6201

Links
- Journal homepage

Evolution, Medicine, and Public Health is a peer-reviewed scientific journal published by Oxford University Press for the International Society for Evolution, Medicine, and Public Health. As of 2022, the editor-in-chief is Cynthia Beall (Case Western Reserve University). The journal is abstracted and indexed in Scopus and the Science Citation Index Expanded. According to the Journal Citation Reports, the journal has a 2020 impact factor of 5.425.
