= Ivyspring International Publisher =

Australian academic publishing company

Ivyspring International Publisher is a publisher of scientific literature including open-access scientific journals, such as the International Journal of Medical Sciences and International Journal of Biological Sciences.
