= List of Medknow Publications academic journals =

This is a list of academic journals published by Medknow Publications.

== A ==
- Acta Medica International
- Advanced Arab Academy of Audio-Vestibulogy Journal
- Advanced Biomedical Research
- Advances in Human Biology
- Advances in Skeletal Muscle Function Assessment
- African Journal for Infertility and Assisted Conception
- African Journal of Medical and Health Sciences
- African Journal of Paediatric Surgery
- African Journal of Trauma
- Aging Brain
- Ain-Shams Journal of Anaesthesiology
- Airway
- Al-Azhar Assiut Medical Journal
- Al-Basar International Journal of Ophthalmology
- Alexandria Journal of Pediatrics
- Ancient Science of Life
- Anesthesia: Essays and Researches
- Annals of African Medicine
- Annals of Bioanthropology
- Annals of Cardiac Anaesthesia
- Annals of Clinical Cardiology
- Annals of Indian Academy of Neurology
- Annals of Indian Academy of Otorhinolaryngology Head and Neck Surgery
- Annals of Indian Psychiatry
- Annals of Maxillofacial Surgery
- Annals of Movement Disorders
- Annals of Nigerian Medicine
- Annals of Pediatric Cardiology
- Annals of Thoracic Medicine
- Annals of Tropical Medicine and Public Health
- Annals of Tropical Pathology
- Apollo Medicine
- APOS Trends in Orthodontics
- Arab Journal of Interventional Radiology
- Archives of Cardiovascular Imaging
- Archives of International Surgery
- Archives of Medicine and Health Sciences
- Archives of Medicine and Surgery
- Archives of Mental Health
- Archives of Pharmacy Practice
- Archives of Trauma Research
- Asia Pacific Journal of Clinical Trials: Nervous System Diseases
- Asia-Pacific Journal of Oncology Nursing
- Asian Journal of Andrology
- Asian Journal of Neurosurgery
- Asian Journal of Oncology
- Asian Journal of Pediatric Nephrology
- Asian Journal of Transfusion Science
- Asian Pacific Journal of Microbiology Research
- Asian Pacific Journal of Reproduction
- Asian Pacific Journal of Tropical Biomedicine
- Asian Pacific Journal of Tropical Medicine
- Astrocyte
- Avicenna Journal of Medicine
- AYU

== B ==
- Benha Medical Journal
- Biomedical Research Journal
- Biomedical and Biotechnology Research Journal
- Biomedical and Pharmaceutical Bulletin
- BLDE University Journal of Health Sciences
- Brain Circulation
- Bulletin of Faculty of Physical Therapy

== C ==
- Canadian Journal of Rural Medicine
- Cancer Research, Statistics, and Treatment
- Cancer Translational Medicine
- Cardiology Plus
- Chinese Journal of Physiology
- Chinese Medical Journal
- Chinese Medicine and Culture
- Clinical Cancer Investigation Journal
- Clinical Communications-Oncology
- Clinical Dermatology Review
- Clinical Trials in Degenerative Diseases
- Clinical Trials in Orthopedic Disorders
- CHRISMED Journal of Health and Research
- Community Acquired Infection
- Conservation and Society
- Contemporary Clinical Dentistry
- Current Medical Issues
- CytoJournal

== D ==
- Delta Journal of Ophthalmology
- Dental Hypotheses
- Dental Research Journal
- Dentistry and Medical Research
- Dermatologica Sinica
- Digital Medicine
- Drug Development and Therapeutics

== E ==
- Education for Health
- Education in the Health Professions
- Egyptian Journal of Bronchology
- Egyptian Journal of Cardiothoracic Anesthesia
- Egyptian Journal of Cataract and Refractive Surgery
- Egyptian Journal of Chest Diseases and Tuberculosis
- Egyptian Journal of Dermatology and Venerology
- Egyptian Journal of Haematology
- Egyptian Journal of Internal Medicine
- Egyptian Journal of Neurology, Psychiatry and Neurosurgery
- Egyptian Journal of Obesity, Diabetes and Endocrinology
- Egyptian Journal of Otolaryngology
- Egyptian Journal of Psychiatry
- Egyptian Journal of Surgery
- Egyptian Nursing Journal
- Egyptian Orthopaedic Journal
- Egyptian Pharmaceutical Journal
- Egyptian Retina Journal
- Egyptian Rheumatology and Rehabilitation
- Emerging Scientist
- Endodontology
- Endoscopic Ultrasound
- Environmental Disease
- Eurasian Journal of Pulmonology
- European Journal of Dentistry
- European Journal of General Dentistry
- European Journal of Prosthodontics
- European Journal of Psychology and Educational Studies

== F ==
- Fertility Science and Research
- Formosan Journal of Surgery

== G ==
- Genome Integrity
- Glioma
- Global Journal of Transfusion Medicine
- Global Journal on Quality and Safety in Healthcare
- Gynecology and Minimally Invasive Therapy

== H ==
- Hamdan Medical Journal
- Heart and Mind
- Heart India
- Heart Views
- Hepatitis B Annual

== I ==
- IJS Short Reports
- Ibnosina Journal of Medicine and Biomedical Sciences
- Imam Journal of Applied Sciences
- Indian Anaesthetists' Forum
- Indian Dermatology Online Journal
- Indian Heart Journal Interventions
- Indian Journal of Allergy, Asthma and Immunology
- Indian Journal of Anaesthesia
- Indian Journal of Burns
- Indian Journal of Cancer
- Indian Journal of Case Reports
- Indian Journal of Cerebral Palsy
- Indian Journal of Child Health
- Indian Journal of Colo-Rectal Surgery
- Indian Journal of Community Medicine
- Indian Journal of Community and Family Medicine
- Indian Journal of Critical Care Medicine
- Indian Journal of Dental Research
- Indian Journal of Dental Sciences
- Indian Journal of Dentistry
- Indian Journal of Dermatology, Venereology and Leprology
- Indian Journal of Dermatology
- Indian Journal of Dermatopathology and Diagnostic Dermatology
- Indian Journal of Drugs in Dermatology
- Indian Journal of Endocrinology and Metabolism
- Indian Journal of Health Sciences and Biomedical Research
- Indian Journal of Medical Microbiology
- Indian Journal of Medical Research
- Indian Journal of Medical Specialities
- Indian Journal of Medical and Paediatric Oncology
- Indian Journal of Multidisciplinary Dentistry
- Indian Journal of Nephrology
- Indian Journal of Nuclear Medicine
- Indian Journal of Occupational Therapy
- Indian Journal of Occupational and Environmental Medicine
- Indian Journal of Ophthalmology
- Indian Journal of Oral Health and Research
- Indian Journal of Oral Sciences
- Indian Journal of Orthopaedics
- Indian Journal of Otology
- Indian Journal of Paediatric Dermatology
- Indian Journal of Pain
- Indian Journal of Palliative Care
- Indian Journal of Pathology & Microbiology
- Indian Journal of Pharmacology
- Indian Journal of Physical Therapy and Research
- Indian Journal of Plastic Surgery
- Indian Journal of Psychiatry
- Indian Journal of Psychological Medicine
- Indian Journal of Public Health
- Indian Journal of Radiology and Imaging
- Indian Journal of Research in Homoeopathy
- Indian Journal of Respiratory Care
- Indian Journal of Rheumatology
- Indian Journal of Sexually Transmitted Diseases and AIDS
- Indian Journal of Social Psychiatry
- Indian Journal of Transplantation
- Indian Journal of Urology
- Indian Journal of Vascular and Endovascular Surgery
- Indian Spine Journal
- Industrial Psychiatry Journal
- International Archives of Health Sciences
- International Journal of Abdominal Wall and Hernia Surgery
- International Journal of Academic Medicine
- International Journal of Advanced Medical and Health Research
- International Journal of Applied and Basic Medical Research
- International Journal of Clinical and Experimental Physiology
- International Journal of Clinicopathological Correlation
- International Journal of Community Dentistry
- International Journal of Critical Illness and Injury Science
- International Journal of Educational and Psychological Researches
- International Journal of Environmental Health Engineering
- International Journal of Forensic Odontology
- International Journal of Growth Factors and Stem Cells in Dentistry
- International Journal of Head and Neck Pathology
- International Journal of Health & Allied Sciences
- International Journal of Health System and Disaster Management
- International Journal of Histopathological Interpretation
- International Journal of Medicine and Health Development
- International Journal of Medicine and Public Health
- International Journal of Mycobacteriology
- International Journal of Neurooncology
- International Journal of Noncommunicable Diseases
- International Journal of Nutrition, Pharmacology, Neurological Diseases
- International Journal of Oral Care and Research
- International Journal of Oral Health Sciences
- International Journal of Orofacial Biology
- International Journal of Orofacial Research
- International Journal of Orthodontic Rehabilitation
- International Journal of Orthopaedic Surgery
- International Journal of Pedodontic Rehabilitation
- International Journal of Pharmaceutical Investigation
- International Journal of Preventive Medicine
- International Journal of Preventive and Clinical Dental Research
- International Journal of Reconstructive and Cosmetic Gynecology
- International Journal of Shoulder Surgery
- International Journal of Social Rehabilitation
- International Journal of Students' Research
- International Journal of Trichology
- International Journal of Yoga: Philosophy, Psychology and Parapsychology
- International Journal of Yoga
- International Journal of the Cardiovascular Academy
- Intervention
- Iranian Journal of Nursing and Midwifery Research
- Iraqi Journal of Hematology
- Istanbul Bilim University Florence Nightingale Journal of Medicine

== J ==
- Journal of Academy of Medical Sciences
- Journal of Acute Disease
- Journal of Advanced Pharmaceutical Technology & Research
- Journal of Anaesthesiology Clinical Pharmacology
- Journal of Applied Hematology
- Journal of Association of Chest Physicians
- Journal of Biopharmaceutics Sciences
- Journal of Cancer Research and Practice
- Journal of Cancer Research and Therapeutics
- Journal of Carcinogenesis
- Journal of Cardiothoracic Trauma
- Journal of Cardiovascular Disease Research
- Journal of Cardiovascular Echography
- Journal of Cleft Lip Palate and Craniofacial Anomalies
- Journal of Clinical Imaging Science
- Journal of Clinical Neonatology
- Journal of Clinical Ophthalmology and Research
- Journal of Clinical Sciences
- Journal of Clinical and Preventive Cardiology
- Journal of Clinical and Scientific Research
- Journal of Conservative Dentistry
- Journal of Craniovertebral Junction and Spine
- Journal of Current Medical Research and Practice
- Journal of Current Oncology
- Journal of Current Research in Scientific Medicine
- Journal of Cutaneous and Aesthetic Surgery
- Journal of Cytology
- Journal of Datta Meghe Institute of Medical Sciences University
- Journal of Dental Implants
- Journal of Dental Lasers
- Journal of Dental Research and Review
- Journal of Dental and Allied Sciences
- Journal of Dermatology and Dermatologic Surgery
- Journal of Diabetes and Endocrine Practice
- Journal of Diabetology (not to be confused with Journal of Diabetology published by Allied Academies)
- Journal of Digestive Endoscopy
- Journal of Dr. NTR University of Health Sciences
- Journal of Education and Ethics in Dentistry
- Journal of Education and Health Promotion
- Journal of Egyptian Women’s Dermatologic Society
- Journal of Emergencies, Trauma, and Shock
- Journal of Experimental and Clinical Anatomy
- Journal of Family Medicine and Primary Care
- Journal of Family and Community Medicine
- Journal of Forensic Dental Sciences
- Journal of Forensic Science and Medicine
- Journal of Geriatric Mental Health
- Journal of Global Infectious Diseases
- Journal of Gynecological Endoscopy and Surgery
- Journal of HIV and Human Reproduction
- Journal of Head & Neck Physicians and Surgeons
- Journal of Health Research and Reviews
- Journal of Health Specialties
- Journal of Human Health
- Journal of Human Reproductive Sciences
- Journal of Immunotherapy and Precision Oncology
- Journal of Indian Academy of Dental Specialist Researchers
- Journal of Indian Academy of Oral Medicine and Radiology
- Journal of Indian Association of Pediatric Surgeons
- Journal of Indian Association of Public Health Dentistry
- Journal of Indian College of Cardiology
- Journal of Indian Orthodontic Society
- Journal of Indian Prosthodontic Society
- Journal of Indian Society of Pedodontics and Preventive Dentistry
- Journal of Indian Society of Periodontology
- Journal of Indian Speech Language & Hearing Association
- Journal of Integrated Health Sciences
- Journal of Integrative Nephrology and Andrology
- Journal of Interdisciplinary Dentistry
- Journal of International Oral Health
- Journal of International Society of Preventive and Community Dentistry
- Journal of Laboratory Physicians
- Journal of Laryngology and Voice
- Journal of Limb Lengthening & Reconstruction
- Journal of Mahatma Gandhi Institute of Medical Sciences
- Journal of Marine Medical Society
- Journal of Marine and Terrestrial Natural Products
- Journal of Medical Investigations and Practice
- Journal of Medical Nutrition and Nutraceuticals
- Journal of Medical Physics
- Journal of Medical Sciences
- Journal of Medical Signals & Sensors
- Journal of Medical Society
- Journal of Medical Ultrasound
- Journal of Medicine in Scientific Research
- Journal of Medicine in the Tropics
- Journal of Mental Health and Human Behaviour
- Journal of Microscopy and Ultrastructure
- Journal of Mid-Life Health
- Journal of Minimal Access Surgery
- Journal of Musculoskeletal Surgery and Research
- Journal of National Accreditation Board for Hospitals & Healthcare Providers
- Journal of Natural Science, Biology and Medicine
- Journal of Nature and Science of Medicine
- Journal of Neurosciences in Rural Practice
- Journal of Nursing and Midwifery Sciences
- Journal of Obesity and Metabolic Research
- Journal of Obstetric Anaesthesia and Critical Care
- Journal of Ophthalmic and Vision Research
- Journal of Oral Research and Review
- Journal of Oral and Maxillofacial Pathology
- Journal of Oral and Maxillofacial Radiology
- Journal of Orofacial Sciences
- Journal of Orthodontic Research
- Journal of Orthodontic Science
- Journal of Orthopaedic Association of South Indian States
- Journal of Orthopaedic Diseases and Traumatology
- Journal of Orthopaedics and Allied Sciences
- Journal of Orthopedics, Traumatology and Rehabilitation
- Journal of Pathology Informatics
- Journal of Patient Safety and Infection Control
- Journal of Pediatric Dentistry
- Journal of Pediatric Neurosciences
- Journal of Pharmaceutical Negative Results
- Journal of Pharmaceutical Research and Clinical Practice
- Journal of Pharmacology and Pharmacotherapeutics
- Journal of Pharmacy and Bioallied Sciences
- Journal of Postgraduate Medicine
- Journal of Radiation and Cancer Research
- Journal of Renal Nutrition and Metabolism
- Journal of Reports in Pharmaceutical Sciences
- Journal of Research in Medical Sciences
- Journal of Research in Siddha Medicine
- Journal of Research in Pharmacy Practice
- Journal of Restorative Dentistry
- Journal of Scientometric Research
- Journal of Social Health and Diabetes
- Journal of Spinal Studies and Surgery
- Journal of Surgical Technique and Case Report
- Journal of Translational Critical Care Medicine
- Journal of Vector Borne Diseases
- Journal of Young Pharmacists
- Journal of the Academy of Clinical Microbiologists
- Journal of the Arab Society for Medical Research
- Journal of the Egyptian Ophthalmological Society
- Journal of the Egyptian Society of Nephrology and Transplantation
- Journal of the Indian Academy of Echocardiography & Cardiovascular Imaging
- Journal of the International Clinical Dental Research Organization
- Journal of the International Society of Physical and Rehabilitation Medicine
- Journal of the Practice of Cardiovascular Sciences
- Journal of the Scientific Society

== K ==
- Karnataka Anaesthesia Journal
- Kasr Al Ainy Medical Journal
- Kerala Journal of Ophthalmology

== L ==
- Libyan International Medical University Journal
- Libyan Journal of Medical Sciences
- Lung India

== M ==
- Makara Journal of Health Research
- MAMC Journal of Medical Sciences
- Matrix Science Medica
- Matrix Science Pharma
- Medical Gas Research
- Medical Journal of Babylon
- Medical Journal of Dr. D.Y. Patil Vidyapeeth
- Menoufia Medical Journal
- Mens Sana Monographs
- Middle East African Journal of Ophthalmology
- Middle East Journal of Medical Genetics
- Muller Journal of Medical Sciences and Research
- Mustansiriya Medical Journal

== N ==
- National Journal of Emergency Medicine
- National Journal of Maxillofacial Surgery
- Neural Regeneration Research
- Neurology India
- New Nigerian Journal of Clinical Research
- Nigerian Journal of Basic and Clinical Sciences
- Nigerian Journal of Cardiology
- Nigerian Journal of Cardiovascular & Thoracic Surgery
- Nigerian Journal of Clinical Practice
- Nigerian Journal of Experimental and Clinical Biosciences
- Nigerian Journal of General Practice
- Nigerian Journal of Health Sciences
- Nigerian Journal of Ophthalmology
- Nigerian Journal of Orthopaedics and Trauma
- Nigerian Journal of Plastic Surgery
- Nigerian Journal of Surgery
- Nigerian Journal of Surgical Research
- Nigerian Journal of Surgical Sciences
- Nigerian Medical Journal
- Nigerian Postgraduate Medical Journal
- Noise & Health
- North American Journal of Medical Sciences
- Nursing and Midwifery Studies
- Nutrition Discovery

== O ==
- Oman Journal of Ophthalmology
- Onco Fertility Journal
- Oncology Journal of India
- Oncology, Gastroenterology and Hepatology Reports

== P ==
- Paediatric Orthopaedics and Related Sciences
- Pan Arab Journal of Rhinology
- Pediatric Respirology and Critical Care Medicine
- Perspectives in Clinical Research
- Pharmaceutical Methods
- Pharmacognosy Magazine
- Pharmacognosy Research
- Pharmacognosy Reviews
- Physiotherapy
- Pigment International
- Port Harcourt Medical Journal
- Preventica

== Q ==
- QAI Journal for Healthcare Quality and Patient Safety

== R ==
- Radiation Protection and Environment
- Reproductive and Developmental Medicine
- Research and Opinion in Anesthesia and Intensive Care
- Research in Cardiovascular Medicine
- Research in Pharmaceutical Sciences
- Rhythm of Circulation

== S ==
- SRM Journal of Research in Dental Sciences
- Sahel Medical Journal
- Saint's International Dental Journal
- Saudi Critical Care Journal
- Saudi Endodontic Journal
- Saudi Journal for Health Sciences
- Saudi Journal of Anaesthesia
- Saudi Journal of Forensic Medicine and Sciences
- Saudi Journal of Gastroenterology
- Saudi Journal of Laparoscopy
- Saudi Journal of Medicine & Medical Sciences
- Saudi Journal of Obesity
- Saudi Journal of Oral Sciences
- Saudi Journal of Physical Therapy
- Saudi Journal of Sports Medicine
- Saudi Surgical Journal
- Scholars' Research Journal
- Scientific Journal of Al-Azhar Medical Faculty, Girls
- Sifa Medical Journal
- Social Health and Behavior
- South Asian Journal of Cancer
- Sub-Saharan African Journal of Medicine
- Sudan Medical Monitor
- Sudanese Journal of Ophthalmology
- Surgical Neurology International
- Systematic Reviews in Pharmacy

== T ==
- TNOA Journal of Ophthalmic Science and Research
- Taiwan Journal of Ophthalmology
- Taiwanese Journal of Psychiatry
- Tanta Dental Journal
- Tanta Medical Journal
- Thyroid Research and Practice
- Translational Surgery
- Tropical Journal of Medical Research
- Tropical Journal of Obstetrics and Gynaecology
- Tropical Parasitology
- Tumor and Microenvironment
- Turkish Journal of Plastic Surgery
- Tzu Chi Medical Journal

== U ==
- Universa Medicina
- Universal Research Journal of Dentistry
- Urological Science
- Urology Annals

== V ==
- Vascular Investigation and Therapy

== W ==
- West African Journal of Radiology
- WHO South-East Asia Journal of Public Health
- World Journal of Colorectal Surgery
- World Journal of Nuclear Medicine
- World Journal of Traditional Chinese Medicine

== Y ==
- Yoga Mimamsa
