= Indian Journal =

Indian Journal may refer to:

- Indian Journal, a newspaper published in Eufaula, Oklahoma
- Indian Journal of Allergy, Asthma and Immunology
- Indian Journal of Anaesthesia
- The Indian Journal of Animal Sciences
- Journal of Indian Army Medical Corps
- Journal of Indian Association for Child and Adolescent Mental Health
- Journal of Indian Association of Pediatric Surgeons
- Journal of Indian Association of Public Health Dentistry
- Indian Journal of Cancer
- Journal of Indian College of Cardiology
- Indian Journal of Community Medicine
- Indian Journal of Critical Care Medicine
- Indian Journal of Dental Research
- Indian Journal of Dermatology
- Indian Journal of Dermatology, Venereology and Leprology
- Indian Journal of Gastroenterology
- Indian Journal of Gender Studies
- Indian Journal of Geo-Marine Sciences
- Indian Journal of Human Genetics
- Indian Journal of International Law
- Indian Journal of Law and Technology
- Indian Journal of Medical and Paediatric Oncology
- Journal of Indian Medical Association
- Indian Journal of Medical Ethics
- Indian Journal of Medical Microbiology
- Indian Journal of Medical Research
- Indian Journal of Medical Sciences
- Journal of Indian Medical Heritage
- Indian Journal of Nephrology
- Journal of Indian Orthodontic Society
- Indian Journal of Occupational and Environmental Medicine
- Indian Journal of Ophthalmology
- Indian Journal of Palliative Care
- Indian Journal of Pathology & Microbiology
- Indian Journal of Pharmaceutical Education and Research
- Indian Journal of Pharmaceutical Sciences
- Indian Journal of Pharmacology
- Journal of Indian Philosophy
- Indian Journal of Physics
- Indian Journal of Plastic Surgery
- Journal of Indian Prosthodontic Society
- Indian Journal of Psychiatry
- Indian Journal of Psychological Medicine
- Indian Journal of Pure and Applied Mathematics
- Indian Journal of Radiology and Imaging
- Indian Journal of Rheumatology
- Indian Journal of Sexually Transmitted Diseases and AIDS
- Journal of Indian Society of Pedodontics and Preventive Dentistry
- Journal of Indian Society of Periodontology
- Journal of Indian Speech Language & Hearing Association
- Indian Journal of Theology
- Indian Journal of Urology
