= International Journal of Green Pharmacy =

- Discipline: Biomedical
- Language: English

Publication details
- History: 2007-present
- Publisher: Medknow Publications (India)
- Frequency: Quarterly

Standard abbreviations
- ISO 4: Int. J. Green Pharm.

Indexing
- ISSN: 0973-8258 (print); 1998-4103 (web)

Links
- Journal homepage

International Journal of Green Pharmacy is a peer-reviewed open access academic journal of pharmaceutical sciences published by Medknow Publications on behalf of the B R Nahata Smriti Sansthan, Mandsaur. The journal was established in 2007.

== Indexing and abstracting ==
The journal is indexed and abstracted in the following bibliographic databases:

- CAB Abstracts
- Caspur
- DOAJ
- EBSCO Publishing's Electronic Databases
- Excerpta Medica/EMBASE
- Expanded Academic ASAP
- Genamics JournalSeek
- Global Health
- Google Scholar
- Health & Wellness Research Center
- Health Reference Center Academic
- Hinari
- Hygiene and Communicable Diseases
- Index Copernicus
- OpenJGate
- SCOLOAR
- SCOPUS
- SIIC databases
- Tropical Diseases Bulletin
- Ulrich's International Periodical Directory
- ProQuest
- Web of Science
