= Middle East African Journal of Ophthalmology =

- Discipline: Ophthalmology
- Language: English

Publication details
- History: 1994-present
- Publisher: Medknow Publications (India)
- Frequency: Quarterly

Standard abbreviations
- ISO 4: Middle East Afr. J. Ophthalmol.

Indexing
- ISSN: 0974-9233 (print); 0975-1599 (web)

Links
- Journal homepage

The Middle East African Journal of Ophthalmology is a peer-reviewed open-access medical journal published on behalf of the Middle East African Council of Ophthalmology. The journal publishes articles on the subjects of Ophthalmology and vision science. It is indexed with African Index Medicus, CAB Abstracts, Caspur, CINAHL, DOAJ, EBSCO, EMR Index Medicus, Expanded Academic ASAP, JournalSeek, Google Scholar, Health & Wellness Research Center, Health Reference Center Academic, Hinari, Index Copernicus, OpenJGate, ProQuest, PubMed, SCOLOAR, SIIC databases, and Ulrich's Periodicals Directory.
