= Noise & Health =

- Discipline: Audiology
- Language: English

Publication details
- History: 1999-present
- Publisher: Medknow Publications
- Frequency: Quarterly
- Impact factor: 1.798 (2016)

Standard abbreviations
- ISO 4: Noise Health

Indexing
- ISSN: 1463-1741 (print); 1998-4030 (web)
- OCLC no.: 41903340

Links
- Journal homepage

Noise & Health is a bimonthly peer-reviewed open access medical journal published by Medknow Publications on behalf of the Noise Research Network. It publishes articles on the subject of auditory and non-auditory effects of occupational, environmental, and leisure noise.

== Abstracting and indexing ==
The journal is abstracted and indexed in Abstracts on Hygiene and Communicable Diseases, Caspur, EBSCO databases, EmCare, Excerpta Medica/EMBASE, Expanded Academic ASAP, MEDLINE/Index Medicus, ProQuest, SafetyLit, Scopus, and Tropical Diseases Bulletin. According to the Journal Citation Reports, the journal has a 2016 impact factor of 1.798.

== See also ==
- Health effects from noise
- Noise pollution
