= Annals of African Medicine =

- Discipline: Medicine
- Language: English
- Edited by: Prof. Nasiru J. Ismail

Publication details
- History: 2002–present
- Publisher: Medknow Publications on behalf of the African Medicine Society
- Frequency: Quarterly
- Open access: yes

Standard abbreviations
- ISO 4: Ann. Afr. Med.

Indexing
- ISSN: 1596-3519 (print); 0975-5764 (web)
- LCCN: 2006243134
- OCLC no.: 163466253

Links
- Journal homepage; Online access; Online archive

Annals of African Medicine is a peer-reviewed open access medical journal covering all aspects of medicine, in particular in relation to Africa. It was established in 2002 and is published by Medknow Publications on behalf of the African Medicine Society. The editor-in-chief is Emmanuel A. Ameh.

== Abstracting and indexing ==
The journal is abstracted and indexed in:

- Abstracts on Hygiene and Communicable Diseases
- African Index Medicus
- CAB Abstracts
- EBSCO Databases
- Excerpta Medica/EMBASE
- Expanded Academic ASAP
- Global Health
- Health Reference Center Academic
- MEDLINE/Index Medicus
- ProQuest
- PubMed
- Scopus
- Tropical Diseases Bulletin
