= Lung India =

- Discipline: Pulmonology
- Language: English

Publication details
- History: 1982-present
- Publisher: Medknow Publications (India)
- Frequency: Quarterly
- Open access: Yes

Standard abbreviations
- ISO 4: Lung India

Indexing
- ISSN: 0970-2113 (print); 0974-598X (web)
- OCLC no.: 10909385

Links
- Journal homepage

Lung India is a peer-reviewed open-access medical journal published on behalf of the Indian Chest Society. The journal publishes articles on the subject of respiratory medicine including immunology, intensive care, sleep medicine, thoracic surgery, thoracic imaging, occupational health, and related subjects. It is indexed with Caspur, DOAJ, EBSCO Publishing's Electronic Databases, Excerpta Medica/EMBASE, Expanded Academic ASAP, JournalSeek, Global Health, Google Scholar, Health & Wellness Research Center, Health Reference Center Academic, Hinari, Index Copernicus, Index Medicus for South-East Asia Region, Indian Science Abstracts, IndMed, MANTIS, MedInd, OpenJGate, ProQuest, PubMed, SCOLOAR, SIIC databases, and Ulrich's Periodicals Directory. The latest impact factor for the journal is 1.3 and the 5-year impact factor is 1.6. The editorial board of Lung India consists of international experts in Pulmonary Medicine. Parvaiz A Koul is the Editor-in-Chief of the journal. The journal is the most popular journal of Pulmonology from India.
