= Journal of Emergencies, Trauma, and Shock =

- Discipline: Emergency medicine
- Language: English
- Edited by: Kelly P O'Keefe, Praveen Aggarwal, Tracy Sanson, L.R. Murmu

Publication details
- History: 2008-present
- Publisher: Medknow Publications on behalf of the INDO-US Emergency and Trauma Collaborative
- Frequency: Quarterly
- Open access: Yes

Standard abbreviations
- ISO 4: J. Emerg. Trauma Shock

Indexing
- ISSN: 0974-2700 (print); 0974-519X (web)
- OCLC no.: 435658524

Links
- Journal homepage; Online access; Online archive

The Journal of Emergencies, Trauma, and Shock is a peer-reviewed open access medical journal published by Medknow Publications on behalf of the INDO-US Emergency and Trauma Collaborative. it covers all aspects of emergency medicine, emergency surgery, pre-hospital care, trauma, and shock. The journal was established in 2008 and the editors-in-chief are Kelly P O'Keefe (University of South Florida), Praveen Aggarwal (All India Institute of Medical Sciences), Tracy Sanson (University of South Florida), and L.R. Murmu (All India Institute of Medical Sciences).

The journal is abstracted and indexed in Abstracts on Hygiene and Communicable Diseases, EBSCO databases, EmCare, Expanded Academic ASAP, Global Health, ProQuest, PubMed Central, SafetyLit, and Scopus.
