= Oman Journal of Ophthalmology =

- Discipline: Ophthalmology
- Language: English

Publication details
- History: 2008-present
- Publisher: Medknow Publications (India)
- Frequency: Triannually

Standard abbreviations
- ISO 4: Oman J. Ophthalmol.

Indexing
- ISSN: 0974-620X (print); 0974-7842 (web)

Links
- Journal homepage

The Oman Journal of Ophthalmology is a peer-reviewed open-access medical journal published on behalf of the Oman Ophthalmic Society and Chief Editor is Dr. Rashid Al-Saidi. It publishes articles on the subject of ophthalmology and vision science.

The journal is indexed with Caspur, DOAJ, EBSCO, EMR Index Medicus, Expanded Academic ASAP, JournalSeek, Global Health, Google Scholar, Health & Wellness Research Center, Health Reference Center Academic, Hinari, Index Copernicus, OpenJGate, ProQuest, PubMed, SCOLOAR, SIIC databases, and Ulrich's Periodicals Directory.
