= Asian Journal of Transfusion Science =

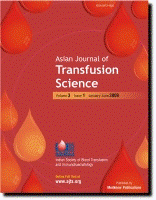
- Discipline: Blood transfusion, immunohematology
- Language: English

Publication details
- History: 2007–present
- Publisher: Medknow Publications (India)
- Frequency: Biannual

Standard abbreviations
- ISO 4: Asian J. Transfus. Sci.

Indexing
- ISSN: 0973-6247 (print); 1998-3565 (web)

Links
- Journal homepage

The Asian Journal of Transfusion Science is a peer-reviewed open-access medical journal published on behalf of the Indian Society of Blood Transfusion and Immunohematology. The journal publishes articles on the subjects of blood transfusion and immunohematology.

== Abstracting and indexing ==
The journal is indexed with Abstracts on Hygiene and Communicable Diseases, CAB Abstracts, Caspur, CINAHL, DOAJ, Scopus, EBSCO, EMCARE, Expanded Academic ASAP, JournalSeek, Global Health, Google Scholar, Health & Wellness Research Center, Health Reference Center Academic, Hinari, Index Copernicus, OpenJGate, PubMed, SCOLOAR, SIIC databases, Tropical Diseases Bulletin, and Ulrich's Periodicals Directory.
