= Journal of Cytology =

- Discipline: Cytology
- Language: English

Publication details
- History: 1984-present
- Publisher: Medknow Publications (India)
- Frequency: Quarterly

Standard abbreviations
- ISO 4: J. Cytol.

Indexing
- ISSN: 0970-9371 (print); 0974-5165 (web)

Links
- Journal homepage

Journal of Cytology is a peer-reviewed open access medical journal published on behalf of the Indian Academy of Cytologists. The journal publishes articles on the subject of clinical and diagnostic cytology and applied cell research. It is indexed by Abstracts on Hygiene and Communicable Diseases, CAB Abstracts, Caspur, CINAHL, DOAJ, EBSCO, Expanded Academic ASAP, JournalSeek, Global Health, Google Scholar, Health & Wellness Research Center, Health Reference Center Academic, Hinari, Index Copernicus, Journal Citation Reports, OpenJGate, Science Citation Index Expanded, SCOLOAR, Scopus, SIIC databases, and Ulrich's Periodicals Directory.
