= Annals of Indian Academy of Neurology =

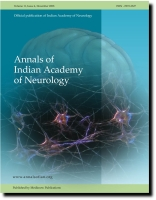
- Discipline: Neurology, neuropsychiatry, and neuroimaging
- Language: English

Publication details
- History: 1998–present
- Publisher: Medknow Publications (India)
- Frequency: Quarterly

Standard abbreviations
- ISO 4: Ann. Indian Acad. Neurol.

Indexing
- ISSN: 0972-2327 (print); 1998-3549 (web)
- LCCN: 2009243365
- OCLC no.: 179949862

Links
- Journal homepage

Annals of Indian Academy of Neurology is a peer-reviewed open-access medical journal published on behalf of the Indian Academy of Neurology. The journal publishes articles on the subjects of neurology, neuropsychiatry, and neuroimaging. It is indexed with Abstracts on Hygiene and Communicable Diseases, CAB Abstracts, Caspur, CINAHL, DOAJ, EBSCO, Excerpta Medica/EMBASE, Expanded Academic ASAP, JournalSeek, Global Health, Google Scholar, Health & Wellness Research Center, Health Reference Center Academic, Hinari, Index Copernicus, Indian Science Abstracts, IndMed, Journal Citation Reports, MANTIS, OpenJGate, PubMed, Science Citation Index Expanded, Scimago Journal Ranking, SCOLOAR, Scopus, SIIC databases, Tropical Diseases Bulletin, and Ulrich's Periodicals Directory.

== See also ==
- Open access in India
