= Journal of Carcinogenesis =

- Discipline: Oncology
- Language: English

Publication details
- History: 2002-present
- Publisher: Medknow Publications (India)
- Frequency: Quarterly

Standard abbreviations
- ISO 4: J. Carcinog.

Indexing
- ISSN: 0974-6773 (print); 1477-3163 (web)

Links
- Journal homepage

The Journal of Carcinogenesis is a peer-reviewed open access medical journal published by Medknow Publications on behalf of the Carcinogenesis Press. The journal covers research in oncology.

== Abstracting and indexing ==
The journal is abstracted and indexed in: Abstracts on Hygiene and Communicable Diseases, CAB Abstracts, EBSCO databases, Excerpta Medica/EMBASE, Expanded Academic ASAP, Pubmed Central, and Scopus.
