= Systematic Reviews in Pharmacy =

- Discipline: Pharmaceutical sciences
- Language: English

Publication details
- History: 2009–present
- Publisher: Medknow Publications (Malaysia)
- Frequency: Monthly
- Open access: Yes

Standard abbreviations
- ISO 4: Syst. Rev. Pharm.

Indexing
- ISSN: 0975-8453 (print); 0976-2779 (web)
- OCLC no.: 1058143131

Links
- Journal homepage; Online access; Online archive

The Systematic Reviews in Pharmacy is a monthly peer-reviewed open-access medical journal covering pharmaceutics, biopharmaceutics, pharmaceutical chemistry, pharmacognosy, pharmacology, pharmaceutical analysis, pharmacy practice, clinical and Biomedical sciences.

== Abstracting and indexing ==
The journal is abstracted and indexed in:

- Abstracts on Hygiene and Communicable Diseases
- CNKI
- ProQuest
- CAB Abstracts
- Chemical Abstracts Service
- EBSCO databases
- Excerpta Medica/Embase
- Expanded Academic ASAP
- Global Health
- Open J-Gate
- CAB Direct (database)
- Scopus
- Index Copernicus

According to Scopus, the journal has a 2019 CiteScore of 3.9
