= Clin-Alert =

- Discipline: Pharmacology
- Language: English
- Edited by: Joyce Generali

Publication details
- History: 1995-present
- Publisher: SAGE Publications
- Frequency: Semi-monthly

Standard abbreviations
- ISO 4: Clin-Alert

Indexing
- ISSN: 1530-812X

Links
- Journal homepage; Online access; Online archive

Clin-Alert is a peer-reviewed academic journal that publishes papers twice a month in the field of Pharmacology. The journal's editor is Joyce Generali. It has been in publication since 1962 and is currently published by SAGE Publications.

In 1962, Clin-Alert's founders--Francis T. Roberts and Robert Plunkett cultivated global subscribers in 55 countries with the aim of disseminating drug safety data. Founded with the overarching goal of reporting on adverse drug events such as drug-induced deaths, permanent disability, and threats to life, the majority of the subscribers were physicians, universities, or medical malpractice attorneys. Roberts and Plunkett created a robust editorial board of 15 clinicians and scientists—including Carl A. Dragstedt, PhD, MD, who discovered the role of histamine in anaphylaxis and was a professor of Northwestern University for 38 years. During the founders' tenure, Clin-Alert was published in Louisville, Ky.

Hubert Humphrey--former Vice President under President Johnson--used data from Clin-Alert in his role as chairman for the U.S. Senate investigation on prescription drugs. Clin-Alert published warnings about the dangers of Orabilex, which was eventually taken off the market by the FDA.

Steadfast in their mission to report on adverse drug reactions with veracity, Roberts and Plunkett refused to accept advertisements from pharmaceutical companies due to personal ethical standards in line with their objective to provide non-biased and reliable information. The first edition of Textbook of Adverse Drug Reactions, published by Oxford University Press, was dedicated in memory to Roberts after his death for his commitment to providing veracious information about pharmacologic safety to clinicians (Davies, 1977).

Plunkett sold Clin-Alert in the 1980s and it remains a vibrant and respected journal under SAGE Publications.

== Scope ==
Clin-Alert publishes articles covering areas such as drug-drug interactions, food-drug interactions, medication errors and dietary supplements. The journal aims to provide physicians, and other health care professionals with comprehensive summaries of adverse drug reactions, drug interactions, and market withdrawals.

== Abstracting and Indexing ==
Clin-Alert is abstracted and indexed in the following databases:

- Academic Onefile
- General Onefile
- InfoTrac
- Scopus
- Zetoc
