= Journal of Oral and Maxillofacial Pathology =

- Discipline: Dentistry
- Language: English

Publication details
- History: 1997-present
- Publisher: Medknow Publications on behalf of the Indian Association of Oral and Maxillofacial Pathology (India)
- Frequency: Biannual
- Open access: Yes

Standard abbreviations
- ISO 4: J. Oral Maxillofac. Pathol.

Indexing
- ISSN: 0973-029X (print); 1998-393X (web)
- OCLC no.: 0973-029X

Links
- Journal homepage

The Journal of Oral and Maxillofacial Pathology is a peer-reviewed open access medical journal published on behalf of the Indian Association of Oral and Maxillofacial Pathology. The journal publishes articles on the subject of dentistry, oral pathology, and maxillofacial surgery.

== Abstracting and indexing ==
The journal is abstracted and indexedin:

- Abstracts on Hygiene and Communicable Diseases
- CAB Abstracts
- EBSCO databases
- Expanded Academic ASAP
- Global Health
- ProQuest
- Scopus
