= Journal of Cutaneous and Aesthetic Surgery =

- Discipline: Aesthetic surgery
- Language: English
- Edited by: Imran Majid

Publication details
- History: 2008-present
- Publisher: Medknow Publications on behalf of the Association of Cutaneous Surgeons of India
- Frequency: Triannually

Standard abbreviations
- ISO 4: J. Cutan. Aesthet. Surg.

Indexing
- ISSN: 0974-2077 (print); 0974-5157 (web)
- OCLC no.: 1076724582

Links
- Journal homepage; Online access; Online archive

The Journal of Cutaneous and Aesthetic Surgery is a triannual peer-reviewed open-access medical journal published by Medknow Publications on behalf of the Association of Cutaneous Surgeons of India. It covers research on skin surgery and aesthetic surgery. The editor-in-chief is Imran Majid (Shri Maharaja Hari Singh Hospital), who succeeded Niti Khunger (Vardhman Mahavir Medical College).

== Abstracting and indexing ==
The journal is abstracted and indexed in EBSCO databases, Expanded Academic ASAP, and Scopus.
