= Indian Journal of Anaesthesia =

- Discipline: Anaesthesiology
- Language: English

Publication details
- History: 2002-present
- Publisher: Medknow Publications on behalf of the Indian Society of Anaesthesiologists (India)
- Frequency: Bimonthly

Standard abbreviations
- ISO 4: Indian J. Anaesth.

Indexing
- CODEN: IJANBN
- ISSN: 0019-5049 (print); 0976-2817 (web)
- OCLC no.: 01752890

Links
- Journal homepage

The Indian Journal of Anaesthesia is a peer-reviewed open-access medical journal published by Medknow Publications on behalf of the Indian Society of Anaesthesiologists. It covers anaesthesiology, critical care medicine, pain and palliative care, disaster management, and trauma and emergency medicine.

== Abstracting and indexing ==
The journal is abstracted and indexed in: Chemical Abstracts, CINAHL, EBSCO Publishing's Databases, Excerpta Medica/EMBASE, Expanded Academic ASAP, Health & Wellness Research Center, Health Reference Center Academic, IndMed, ProQuest, Pubmed Central, SafetyLit, Scopus, SIIC databases, Tropical Diseases Bulletin, DOAJ, Indian Science Abstracts and Ulrich's Periodicals Directory.

== See also ==
- Open access in India
