= Indian Journal of Community Medicine =

- Discipline: Public health
- Language: English

Publication details
- History: 1985-present
- Publisher: Medknow Publications on behalf of the Indian Association of Preventive & Social Medicine (India)
- Frequency: Quarterly

Standard abbreviations
- ISO 4: Indian J. Community Med.

Indexing
- ISSN: 0970-0218 (print); 1998-3581 (web)
- OCLC no.: 29807933

Links
- Journal homepage

The Indian Journal of Community Medicine is an international peer-reviewed open-access medical journal published by Medknow Publications on behalf of the Indian Association of Preventive & Social Medicine. The journal publishes articles on family health care, epidemiology, biostatistics, public health administration, health care delivery, national health problems, medical anthropology, and social medicine.

== Abstracting and indexing ==
The journal is abstracted and indexed by Abstracts on Hygiene and Communicable Diseases, CAB Abstracts, EBSCO, EmCare, Expanded Academic ASAP, Global Health, Health & Wellness Research Center, Health Reference Center Academic, IndMed, MedIND, PubMed, SafetyLit, Scopus, SIIC databases, Tropical Diseases Bulletin, and Ulrich's Periodicals Directory.

== See also ==
- Open access in India
