= Journal of Medical Physics =

- Discipline: Medical physics
- Language: English
- Edited by: A. S. Pradhan

Publication details
- Former name: AMPI Medical Physics Bulletin
- History: 1976–present
- Publisher: Medknow Publications (India)
- Frequency: Quarterly
- Open access: Yes

Standard abbreviations
- ISO 4: J. Med. Phys.

Indexing
- Journal of Medical Physics
- CODEN: JMPHFE
- ISSN: 0971-6203 (print); 1998-3913 (web)
- OCLC no.: 32144669
- AMPI Medical Physics Bulletin
- CODEN: AMPBDV
- ISSN: 0250-5002
- OCLC no.: 06895791

Links
- Journal homepage

The Journal of Medical Physics is a quarterly peer-reviewed open access medical journal published on behalf of the Association of Medical Physicists of India by Medknow Publications. It was established in 1976 as the AMPI Medical Physics Bulletin and obtained its current name in 1996. It covers research in nuclear medicine.

== Abstracting and indexing ==
The journal is abstracted and indexed in:

- EBSCO databases
- Excerpta Medica/Embase
- Expanded Academic ASAP
- ProQuest
- DOAJ
- EMBASE/Excerpta Medica
- Emerging Sources Citation Index
- Indian Science Abstracts
- IndMed
- Scimago Journal Ranking
- Pubmed Central
- Scopus
