= Indian Journal of Human Genetics =

- Discipline: Human genetics
- Language: English
- Edited by: K. Ghosh

Publication details
- History: 1995-present
- Publisher: Medknow Publications on behalf of the Indian Society of Human Genetics (India)
- Frequency: Triannual
- Open access: Yes

Standard abbreviations
- ISO 4: Indian J. Hum. Genet.

Indexing
- ISSN: 0971-6866 (print); 1998-362X (web)
- OCLC no.: 52961585

Links
- Journal homepage; Online access; Online archive

The Indian Journal of Human Genetics is a peer-reviewed open access medical journal published by Medknow Publications on behalf of the Indian Society of Human Genetics. It covers all aspects of human genetics.

== Abstracting and indexing ==
The journal is abstracted and indexed in:

- Abstracts on Hygiene and Communicable Diseases
- Bioline International
- CAB Abstracts
- CINAHL
- CSA databases
- Current Contents/Life Sciences
- EBSCO databases
- Elsevier BIOBASE
- EMBiology
- Excerpta Medica/EMBASE
- Expanded Academic ASAP
- ProQuest
- PubMed Central
- Scopus
- Tropical Diseases Bulletin
