= Indian Journal of Ophthalmology =

- Discipline: Ophthalmology
- Language: English

Publication details
- History: 1953-present
- Publisher: Medknow Publications (India)
- Frequency: Bimonthly
- Open access: Yes
- Impact factor: 1.019 (2011)

Standard abbreviations
- ISO 4: Indian J. Ophthalmol.

Indexing
- CODEN: IJOMBM
- ISSN: 0301-4738 (print); 1998-3689 (web)
- OCLC no.: 01590475

Links
- Journal homepage

The Indian Journal of Ophthalmology is a peer-reviewed open-access medical journal published on behalf of the All India Ophthalmological Society. The journal publishes articles on ophthalmology and vision science.

== Abstracting and indexing ==
The journal is indexed in Abstracts on Hygiene and Communicable Diseases, Biological Abstracts, BIOSIS Previews, CAB Abstracts, CINAHL, EBSCO, Excerpta Medica/EMBASE, Expanded Academic ASAP, Global Health, Health & Wellness Research Center, Health Reference Center Academic, MEDLINE/Index Medicus, PubMed, SafetyLit, Science Citation Index Expanded, SCOLOAR, Scopus, SIIC databases, SNEMB, Tropical Diseases Bulletin, and Ulrich's Periodicals Directory.

As of 2025, the h-index is 55 and the 5-years h-index is 93, ranking the Indian Journal of Ophthalmology at the 8th position in Google Scholar top publications of the "Ophthalmology & Optometry" category.
