= Indian Journal of Dental Research =

- Discipline: Dentistry
- Language: English

Publication details
- History: 2005-present
- Publisher: Medknow Publications on behalf of the Indian Society of Dental Research (India)
- Frequency: Quarterly

Standard abbreviations
- ISO 4: Indian J. Dent. Res.

Indexing
- ISSN: 0970-9290 (print); 1998-3603 (web)

Links
- Journal homepage

The Indian Journal of Dental Research is a peer-reviewed open-access medical journal published by Medknow Publications on behalf of the Indian Society of Dental Research. It covers orodental diseases, preventive and community dentistry, oral pathology, and dentofacial orthopedics. The journal was launched in 2005.

== Abstracting and indexing ==
The journal is indexed in EBSCO, EMCARE, Excerpta Medica/EMBASE, Expanded Academic ASAP, Health & Wellness Research Center, Health Reference Center Academic, MEDLINE/Index Medicus, SafetyLit, Scopus, SIIC databases, and Ulrich's Periodicals Directory.

== See also ==
- Open access in India
