= African Journal of Paediatric Surgery =

- Discipline: Pediatry, surgery
- Language: English
- Edited by: Francis A. Uba

Publication details
- History: 2004–present
- Publisher: Medknow Publications
- Open access: Yes

Standard abbreviations
- ISO 4: Afr. J. Paediatr. Surg.

Indexing
- ISSN: 0189-6725 (print); 0974-5998 (web)

Links
- Journal homepage

The African Journal of Paediatric Surgery is a peer-reviewed medical journal publishing articles related to clinical or laboratory-based research in paediatric surgery.

== Indexing and abstracting information ==
The journal is indexed in Abstracts on Hygiene and Communicable Diseases, African Index Medicus, CAB Abstracts, EBSCO Databases, Scopus, MEDLINE, and Index Medicus.
