= Journal of Cancer Research and Therapeutics =

- Discipline: Oncology
- Language: English
- Edited by: D.N. Sharma

Publication details
- History: 2005–present
- Publisher: Medknow Publications on behalf of the Association of Radiation Oncologists of India (India)
- Frequency: Quarterly
- Open access: Yes
- License: Creative Commons Attribution-NonCommercial-ShareAlike 4.0
- Impact factor: 1.3 (2022)

Standard abbreviations
- ISO 4: J. Cancer Res. Ther.

Indexing
- ISSN: 0973-1482 (print); 1998-4138 (web)
- OCLC no.: 803593621

Links
- Journal homepage; Online access; Online archive

The Journal of Cancer Research and Therapeutics is a peer-reviewed open access medical journal published by Medknow Publications on behalf of the Association of Radiation Oncologists of India. The journal covers research in oncology, radiation oncology, medical imaging, radiation protection, non-ionising radiation, and radiobiology.

The journal has a 2022 impact factor of 1.3. It is currently abstracted and indexed in Index Medicus/MEDLINE/PubMed and Scopus.
