= Pharmacognosy Magazine =

- Discipline: Pharmacognosy
- Language: English

Publication details
- History: 2005-present
- Publisher: Medknow Publications (India)
- Frequency: Quarterly

Standard abbreviations
- ISO 4: Pharmacogn. Mag.

Indexing
- ISSN: 0973-1296 (print); 0976-4062 (web)

Links
- Journal homepage

Pharmacognosy Magazine is a peer-reviewed open-access medical journal published on behalf of the Pharmacognosy Network Worldwide. It publishes articles on the subjects of pharmacognosy, natural products, phytochemistry, phytopharmacology. The journal is indexed with CAB Abstracts, Caspur, Chemical Abstracts, CSA databases, DOAJ, EBSCO, Excerpta Medica/EMBASE, Google Scholar, Hinari, Index Copernicus, Indian Science Abstracts, Journal Citation Reports, OpenJGate, ProQuest, PubMed, Science Citation Index Expanded, Scopus, and Ulrich's Periodicals Directory.

Phcog.net (Pharmacognosy Network Worldwide) appeared on Beall's list from October 2012 through September 12, 2015.

== See also ==
- Pharmacognosy
