= Journal of Pediatric Neurosciences =

- Discipline: Pediatric neurology
- Language: English
- Edited by: Dr. Deepak Agrawal (2026-Present)

Publication details
- History: 2006-present
- Publisher: Medknow Publications on behalf of the Indian Society for Pediatric Neurosurgery (India)
- Frequency: Quarterly
- Open access: Yes

Standard abbreviations
- ISO 4: J. Pediatr. Neurosci.

Indexing
- ISSN: 1817-1745 (print); 1998-3948 (web)
- OCLC no.: 64202355

Links
- Journal homepage; Online access; Online archive

The Journal of Pediatric Neurosciences is a peer-reviewed open access medical journal published by Medknow Publications on behalf of the Indian Society for Pediatric Neurosurgery. It covers research in pediatric neurology, neurosurgery, neuroimaging, and neuropathology.

== Abstracting and indexing ==
The journal is abstracted and indexed in:

- ABSCO databases
- Excerpta Medica
- EMBASE
- Expanded Academic ASAP
- ProQuest
- Pubmed Central
- Scopus
