= Journal of Indian Association of Pediatric Surgeons =

- Discipline: Surgery, pediatrics
- Language: English

Publication details
- History: 1996-present
- Publisher: Medknow Publications (India)
- Frequency: Quarterly

Standard abbreviations
- ISO 4: J. Indian Assoc. Pediatr. Surg.

Indexing
- ISSN: 0971-9261 (print); 1998-3891 (web)

Links
- Journal homepage

The Journal of Indian Association of Pediatric Surgeons is a peer-reviewed open access medical journal published on behalf of the Indian Association of Pediatric Surgeons. It was started in 1995. The journal publishes articles on the subject of pediatric surgery (clinical and experimental surgery related to children).

The journal is abstracted and indexed by Abstracts on Hygiene and Communicable Diseases, Bioline International, CAB Abstracts, Caspur, CINAHL, DOAJ, EBSCO, Expanded Academic ASAP, Genamics JournalSeek, Global Health, Google Scholar, Health & Wellness Research Center, Health Reference Center Academic, Hinari, Index Copernicus, IndMed, MedInd, OpenJGate, PubMed, Scimago Journal Ranking, SCOLOAR, Scopus, SIIC databases, SNEMB, Tropical Diseases Bulletin, and Ulrich's Periodicals Directory.
