= Mens Sana Monographs =

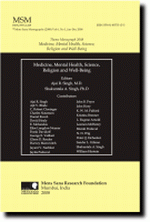
- Discipline: Biomedicine, mental health
- Language: English
- Edited by: Ajai R. Singh

Publication details
- History: 2003–2016
- Publisher: Medknow Publications (India)
- Frequency: Annual
- Open access: Yes

Standard abbreviations
- ISO 4: Mens Sana Monogr.

Indexing
- ISSN: 0973-1229 (print); 1998-4014 (web)
- OCLC no.: 234238733

Links
- Journal homepage

The Mens Sana Monographs was a peer-reviewed open-access monographic series of mental and physical medicine. It is published by Medknow Publications on behalf of the Mens Sana Research Foundation. Every volume is also published as a book, with a separate ISBN. The series was established in 2003 as a bimonthly publication but is now published annually since 2007. The editor-in-chief is Ajai R. Singh. Issues are dedicated to a particular theme.

== Reception ==
The 2006 monograph entitled What Medicine Means to Me was reviewed by the Indian Journal of Psychiatry. Some editorials have been re-published elsewhere.

== Abstracting and indexing ==
The series is abstracted and indexed in CAB Abstracts, EBSCO databases, Global Health, and Scopus.
