= Journal of Minimal Access Surgery =

- Discipline: Biomedical
- Language: English

Publication details
- History: 2005-present
- Publisher: Medknow Publications & Media Pvt. Ltd (India)
- Frequency: Quarterly

Standard abbreviations
- ISO 4: J. Minimal Access Surg.
- NLM: J Minim Access Surg

Indexing
- ISSN: 0972-9941 (print); 1998-3921 (web)

Links
- Journal homepage

Journal of Minimal Access Surgery is a peer-reviewed open access journal published on behalf of the Indian Association of Gastrointestinal Endo Surgeons. The journal publishes articles on the subject of Laparoscopic and thoracoscopic surgery, laparoscopic urology and gastrointestinal endoscopy.

The journal is indexed with Bioline International, Caspur, CINAHL, CSA databases, DOAJ, EBSCO Publishing's Electronic Databases, Expanded Academic ASAP, Genamics JournalSeek, Google Scholar, Health & Wellness Research Center, Health Reference Center Academic, Hinari, Index Copernicus, OpenJGate, ProQuest, PubMed, Pubmed Central, Scimago Journal Ranking, SCOLOAR, SCOPUS, SIIC databases, SNEMB, Ulrich's International Periodical Directory.

There are no page charges for submissions to the journal.
