= Indian Journal of Sexually Transmitted Diseases and AIDS =

- Discipline: Sexology
- Language: English
- Edited by: Y. S. Marfatia

Publication details
- History: 1980–present
- Publisher: Medknow Publications (India)
- Frequency: Biannually

Standard abbreviations
- ISO 4: Indian J. Sex. Transm. Dis. AIDS

Indexing
- ISSN: 0253-7184 (print); 1998-3816 (web)
- OCLC no.: 58548417

Links
- Journal homepage; Online access; Online archives

The Indian Journal of Sexually Transmitted Diseases and AIDS is a peer-reviewed open-access medical journal that publishes articles about the study of sexually transmitted diseases. It is an official publication of the Indian Association for the Study of Sexually Transmitted Diseases. The editor-in-chief is Y. S. Marfatia.

== Abstracting and indexing ==
According to the publisher, the journal is indexed in:

- Abstracts on Hygiene and Communicable Diseases
- CAB Abstracts
- EBSCO Publishing
- Excerpta Medica
- InfoTrac
- Global Health
- SCOLOAR
- Tropical Diseases Bulletin
