= Indian Journal of Palliative Care =

- Discipline: Palliative care
- Language: English

Publication details
- History: 1995-present
- Publisher: Medknow Publications (India)
- Frequency: Triannually
- Open access: Yes
- License: CC BY-NC-SA

Standard abbreviations
- ISO 4: Indian J. Palliat. Care

Indexing
- ISSN: 0973-1075 (print); 1998-3735 (web)
- OCLC no.: 65173172

Links
- Journal homepage; Online access; Online archive

The Indian Journal of Palliative Care is a peer-reviewed open-access medical journal published on behalf of the Indian Association of Palliative Care. The journal publishes articles on the subject of palliative and supportive care including palliative nursing.

== Abstracting and indexing ==
The journal is indexed in EBSCO databases, EMCare, Expanded Academic ASAP, PubMed, and Scopus.
