= Journal of Indian Society of Periodontology =

- Discipline: Periodontology
- Language: English
- Edited by: Ashish Kumar

Publication details
- History: 1997-present
- Publisher: Medknow Publications on behalf of the Indian Society of Periodontology (India)
- Frequency: Bimonthly
- Open access: Yes

Standard abbreviations
- ISO 4: J. Indian Soc. Periodontol.

Indexing
- ISSN: 0972-124X (print); 0975-1580 (web)
- OCLC no.: 489056116

Links
- Journal homepage; Online access; Online archive

The Journal of Indian Society of Periodontology is a peer-reviewed open access medical journal published by Medknow Publications on behalf of the Indian Society of Periodontology. It covers all aspects of periodontology.

== Abstracting and indexing ==
The journal is abstracted and indexed in:

- Expanded Academic ASAP
- EBSCO databases
- ProQuest
- PubMed Central
- Scopus
