= International Journal of Shoulder Surgery =

- Discipline: Biomedical
- Language: English

Publication details
- History: 2007-present
- Publisher: Medknow Publications (India)
- Frequency: Quarterly

Standard abbreviations
- ISO 4: Int. J. Shoulder Surg.

Indexing
- ISSN: 0973-6042

Links
- Journal homepage

International Journal of Shoulder Surgery (ISSN: Print - 0973-6042) is peer-reviewed open access journal published on behalf of the Cape Shoulder Institute. The journal publishes articles on the subject of Orthopaedics.

The journal is indexed with African Index Medicus, Caspur, DOAJ, EBSCO Publishing’s Electronic Databases, Expanded Academic ASAP, Genamics JournalSeek, Google Scholar, Health & Wellness Research Center, Health Reference Center Academic, Hinari, Index Copernicus, OpenJGate, PubMed, Pubmed Central, SCOLOAR, SIIC databases, Ulrich’s International Periodical Directory.

There are no page charges for submissions to the journal.
