= Annals of Pediatric Cardiology =

- Discipline: Pediatrics, cardiology, congenital cardiac surgery
- Language: English

Publication details
- History: 2008–present
- Publisher: Medknow Publications (India)
- Frequency: Bimonthly (6issues a year)

Standard abbreviations
- ISO 4: Ann. Pediatr. Cardiol.

Indexing
- ISSN: 0974-2069 (print); 0974-5149 (web)

Links
- Journal homepage

Annals of Pediatric Cardiology is a peer-reviewed open-access medical journal published on behalf of the Pediatric Cardiology Society of India https://pcsi.pediatriccardiacsocietyofindia.com/. The journal publishes articles on the subjects of pediatric cardiology, cardiac surgery, cardiac pathology, cardiac anesthesia, pediatric intensive care, and cardiac imaging. The Annals of Pediatric Cardiology is being launched with the idea of providing a common platform for presenting data and expressing views for members of the following specialties viz. cardiology, cardiac surgery, anesthesiology, intensive care as well as more basic disciplines of pathology, molecular biology and genetics. The journal is registered with the following abstracting partners: Baidu Scholar, CNKI (China National Knowledge Infrastructure), EBSCO Publishing's Electronic Databases, Ex Libris – Primo Central, Google Scholar, Hinari, Infotrieve, National Science Library, ProQuest, TDNet, Wanfang Data

The journal is indexed with, or included in, the following: DOAJ, EMBASE/ Excerpta Medica, Emerging Sources Citation Index, Indian Science Abstracts, PubMed Central, Scimago Journal Ranking, SCOPUS, Web of Science

Impact Factor® as reported in the 2024 Journal Citation Reports® (Clarivate Analytics, 2025): 0.7
