= Indian Journal of Dermatology, Venereology and Leprology =

- Discipline: Dermatology
- Language: English

Publication details
- History: 1961-present
- Publisher: Scientific Scholar (https://scientificscholar.com) on behalf of the Indian Association of Dermatologists, Venereologists and Leprologists (India)
- Frequency: Bimonthly
- License: Attribution-NonCommercial-ShareAlike 4.0 International (CC BY-NC-SA 4.0)
- Impact factor: 2.217 (2021)

Standard abbreviations
- ISO 4: Indian J. Dermatol. Venereol. Leprol.

Indexing
- CODEN: IJDLDY
- ISSN: 0378-6323 (print); 0973-3922 (web)
- OCLC no.: 02884822

Links
- Journal homepage; Current Issue; Archives

The Indian Journal of Dermatology, Venereology and Leprology is a peer-reviewed open-access medical journal published by Scientific Scholar on behalf of the Indian Association of Dermatologists, Venereologists and Leprologists. The journal covers clinical and experimental dermatology, cutaneous biology, dermatological therapeutics, cosmetic dermatology, dermatopathology, dermatosurgery, pediatric dermatology, photodermatology, and HIV medicine.

== Abstracting and indexing ==
The journal is indexed in Abstracts on Hygiene and Communicable Diseases, Bioline International, CAB Abstracts, CINAHL, EBSCO, Excerpta Medica/EMBASE, Expanded Academic ASAP, Global Health, Health & Wellness Research Center, Health Reference Center Academic, IndMed, MEDLINE/Index Medicus, SafetyLit, Science Citation Index Expanded, Scopus, SIIC databases, Tropical Diseases Bulletin, and Ulrich's Periodicals Directory.

== See also ==
- Open access in India
