= Journal of Indian Society of Pedodontics and Preventive Dentistry =

Open access peer-reviewed journal

- Discipline: Dentistry
- Language: English
- Edited by: Sudhindra Baliga

Publication details
- History: 1983-present
- Publisher: Medknow Publications on behalf of the Indian Society of Pedodontics and Preventive Dentistry (India)
- Frequency: Quarterly

Standard abbreviations
- ISO 4: J. Indian Soc. Pedod. Prev. Dent.

Indexing
- ISSN: 0970-4388 (print); 1998-3905 (web)
- OCLC no.: 11848690

Links
- Journal homepage; Online access; Online archives

The Journal of Indian Society of Pedodontics and Preventive Dentistry is a quarterly peer-reviewed open access medical journal published by Medknow Publications on behalf of the Indian Society of Pedodontics and Preventive Dentistry. The journal covers research in pediatric dentistry, preventive and community dentistry, oral pathology, and dentofacial orthopedics.

== Abstracting and indexing ==
The journal is abstracted and indexed in:

- Abstracts on Hygiene and Communicable Diseases
- CAB Abstracts
- EBSCO databases
- EmCare
- Expanded Academic ASAP
- MEDLINE/Index Medicus
- Scopus
