= Indian Journal of Medical and Paediatric Oncology =

- Discipline: Oncology, pediatrics
- Language: English

Publication details
- Former name: Indian Journal of Cancer Chemotherapy
- History: 2001-present
- Publisher: Medknow Publications on behalf of the Indian Society of Medical and Paediatric Oncology (India)
- Frequency: Quarterly

Standard abbreviations
- ISO 4: Indian J. Med. Paediatr. Oncol.

Indexing
- ISSN: 0971-5851 (print); 0975-2129 (web)
- OCLC no.: 38149992

Links
- Journal homepage

The Indian Journal of Medical and Paediatric Oncology is a peer-reviewed open-access medical journal published by Medknow Publications on behalf of the Indian Society of Medical and Paediatric Oncology. The journal publishes articles on oncology, pediatric oncology, hemato-oncology, and oncopathology.

== Abstracting and indexing ==
The journal is indexed in EBSCO, Expanded Academic ASAP, Global Health, Health & Wellness Research Center, Health Reference Center Academic, IndMed, MedInd, PubMed, Scopus, SIIC databases, and Ulrich's Periodicals Directory.
