= Indian Journal of Medical Microbiology =

Indian peer-reviewed open-access medical journal

- Discipline: Medical microbiology
- Language: English

Publication details
- History: 1983-present
- Publisher: Medknow Publications on behalf of the Indian Association of Medical Microbiology (India)
- Frequency: Quarterly
- Impact factor: 1.6 (2022)

Standard abbreviations
- ISO 4: Indian J. Med. Microbiol.

Indexing
- CODEN: IJMMEF
- ISSN: 0255-0857 (print); 1998-3646 (web)
- OCLC no.: 15085386

Links
- Journal homepage

The Indian Journal of Medical Microbiology is a peer-reviewed open-access medical journal published by Medknow Publications on behalf of the Indian Association of Medical Microbiology. The journal publishes articles on medical microbiology including bacteriology, virology, mycology, and parasitology.

== Abstracting and indexing ==
The journal is indexed in Abstracts on Hygiene and Communicable Diseases, Bioline International, CAB Abstracts, CINAHL, CSA databases, EBSCO, Excerpta Medica/EMBASE, Expanded Academic ASAP, Global Health, Health & Wellness Research Center, Health Reference Center Academic, IndMed, MedInd, MEDLINE/Index Medicus, Science Citation Index Expanded, Scopus, SIIC databases, Tropical Diseases Bulletin, and Ulrich's Periodicals Directory.

== See also ==
- Open access in India
