= Journal of Pharmacy and Bioallied Sciences =

- Discipline: Pharmacy
- Language: English
- Edited by: R. K. Khar

Publication details
- History: 2009-present
- Publisher: Medknow Publications
- Frequency: Quarterly

Standard abbreviations
- ISO 4: J. Pharm. Bioallied Sci.

Indexing
- ISSN: 0976-4879 (print); 0975-7406 (web)

Links
- Journal homepage

The Journal of Pharmacy and Bioallied Sciences is a quarterly medical journal. It is the official publication of the Organization of Pharmaceutical Unity with BioAllied Sciences. The current editor-in-chief is R.K. Khar.

== Abstracting and indexing ==
The journal is abstracted and indexed in EBSCO Databases, Health & Wellness Research Center, Health Reference Center Academic, ProQuest, PubMed/PubMed Central, and Summon by Serial Solutions. It was indexed in Scopus from 2011 to 2024, when indexing was discontinued.
