= All India Ophthalmological Society =

Indian Ophthalmological Society

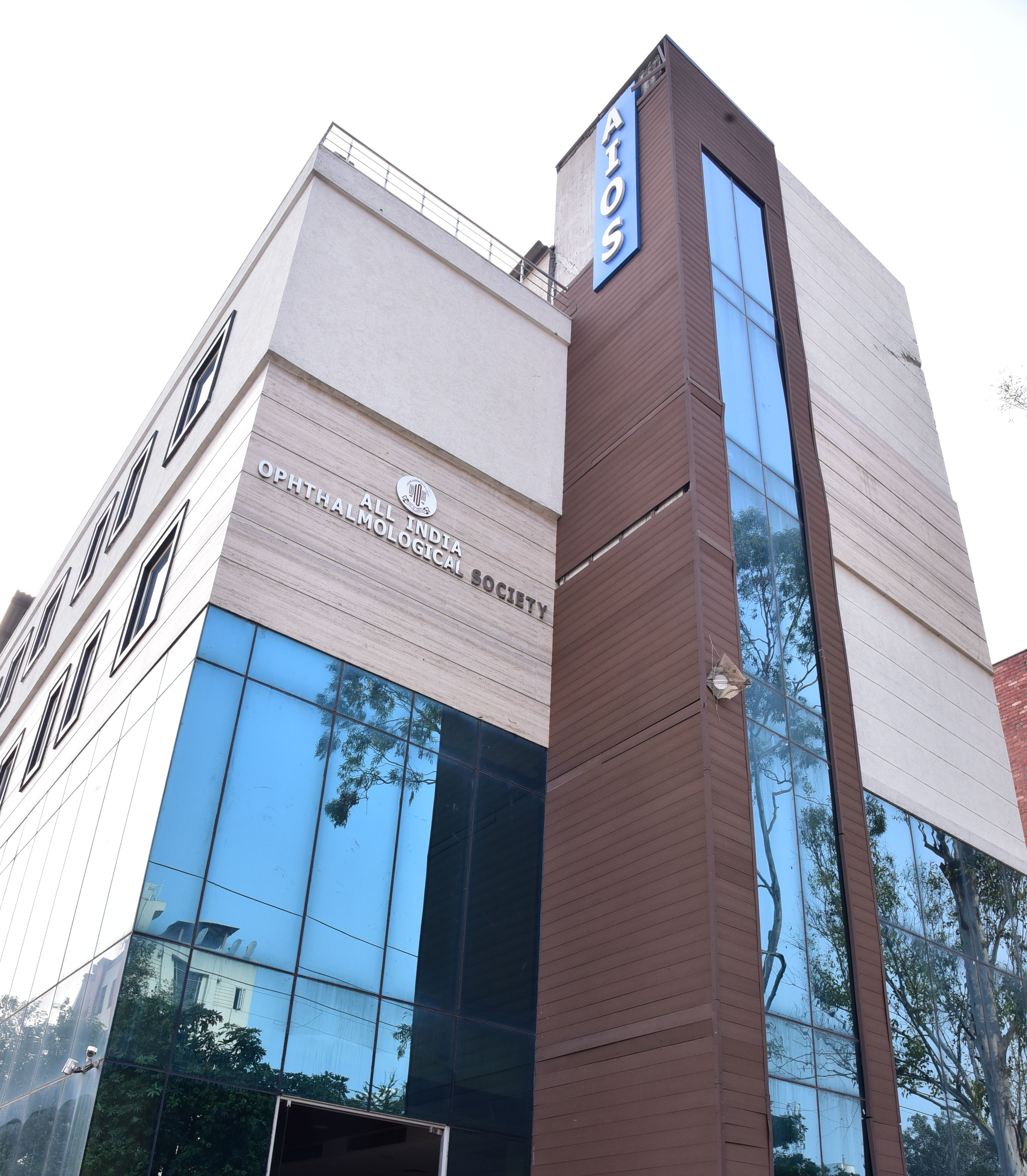
AIOS Headquarter

Established in 1930, the All India Ophthalmological Society (AIOS) is a scientific body promoting study in the field of ophthalmology and promoting ophthalmic care and research in India.

== History ==
Under the societies registration act of 1883, AIOS was established in 1930.

In Jun 2022, ENTOD Pharmaceuticals collaborated with the All India Ophthalmological Society for the coordination of the 80th All India Ophthalmological Conference (AIOC) 2022.

== Publications ==
The Indian Journal of Ophthalmology is a peer-reviewed open-access medical journal published on behalf of the society. It is sent periodically to all the members.An additional publication, AIOS Times is distributed periodically.

== Annual meetings ==
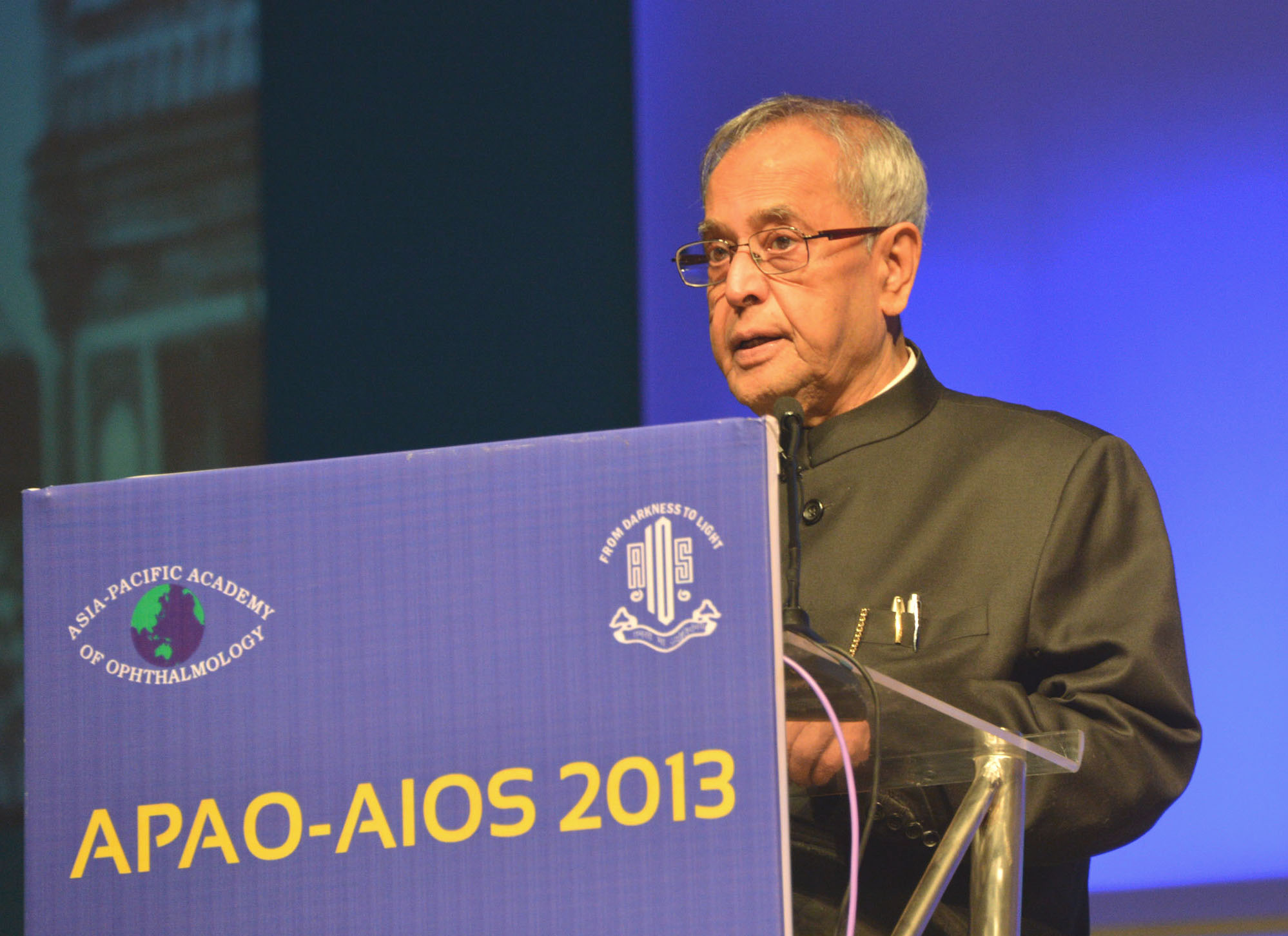
Pranab Mukherjee delivering the inaugural address at the 28th Congress of ASIA Pacific, Academy of Ophthalmology in Conjunction with the 71st Annual Conference of All India Ophthalmological Society (APAO-AIOS-2013)

AIOS holds an annual conference called the All India Ophthalmological Conference (AIOC) as part of the scientific proceedings of the society.AIOS 2017 was held in Jaipur. AIOC 2018 will be the 76th annual conference of the society and will be held in February in Coimbatore, Tamil Nadu.
