= Indian Journal of Plastic Surgery =

Academic journal

- Discipline: Plastic surgery
- Language: English
- Edited by: Dr. Dinesh Kadam

Publication details
- History: 1968-present
- Publisher: Medknow Publications on behalf of the Association of Plastic Surgeons of India (India)
- Frequency: Biannual
- Open access: Yes
- License: CC BY-NC-SA

Standard abbreviations
- ISO 4: Indian J. Plast. Surg.

Indexing
- ISSN: 0970-0358 (print); 1998-376X (web)
- OCLC no.: 818996907

Links
- Journal homepage; Online access; Online archive

The Indian Journal of Plastic Surgery is a peer-reviewed open access medical journal published by Medknow Publications on behalf of the Association of Plastic Surgeons of India. It covers research on all aspects of aesthetic plastic surgery.

== Abstracting and indexing ==
The journal is abstracted and indexed in EBSCO Databases, Expanded Academic ASAP, ProQuest, PubMed, PubMed Central, and Scopus.
