= Pardey Lukis =

British doctor, editor, and administrator (1857–1917)

Lieutenant-General Sir Charles Pardey Lukis KCSI, FRCS
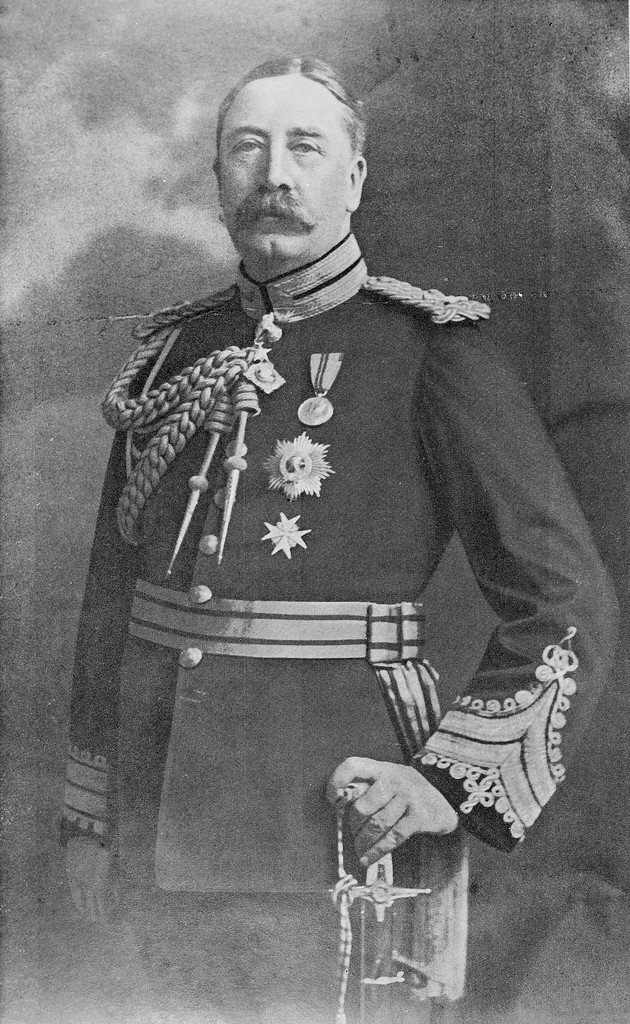
- Born: 1857
- Died: 22 October 1917 (aged 59–60); Simla, India
- Education: MD, 1904
- Alma mater: University of London
- Spouse(s): Margaret Mary Byers, Lady Lillian Lukis (daughter of Colonel John Stewart, R.A.)
- Children: Three sons and three daughters
- Parent(s): William and Caroline Lukis
- Relatives: Caroline Pardey (grandmother)
- Awards: Commander of the Order of the Star of India, 1910; Knight Commander of the Order of the Star of India, 1911

Sir Charles Pardey Lukis KCSI FRCS (1857 – 22 October 1917) was the inaugural editor of the Indian Journal of Medical Research and served as the Director-General of the Indian Medical Service (1910–1917). Pardey was also a strong supporter of the establishment of the Calcutta School of Tropical Medicine, though he did not live to see it open in 1921.

He received his medical training at St. Bartholomew's Hospital, becoming a Fellow of the Royal College of Surgeons in 1890. The same year, he entered the Bengal Army and served and worked in India for the remainder of his career, though he was awarded his MD from the University of London in 1904. He was appointed as a professor of medicine in Calcutta in 1905 and became honorary surgeon to the Viceroy of India the same year. He was made a Commander of the Order of the Star of India in 1910, was knighted in 1911, and became honorary surgeon to the king in 1913. His appointment as director-general of the Indian Medical Service was at the rank of surgeon-general, and he was promoted to lieutenant general in 1916.

Theodore Lukis, his son, was expected to follow in his father's footsteps and qualified as a medical doctor but was killed during the First World War. Lukis was extremely bitter about his loss, writing that "his has been a wasted life and I can find no justification, for a medical man, who gives up his profession of healing, in order to endeavour to kill his fellow creatures, even though they be enemies".

Lukis died at Simla in October 1917 aged reportedly 60, and is buried in Simla Old Cemetery.

A book co-written by Lukis, Tropical Hygiene for Residents in Tropical and Sub-Tropical Climates, was re-issued in 2010. Lukis also wrote a handbook on midwifery.
