= Indian Journal of Dermatology =

- Discipline: Dermatology
- Language: English
- Edited by: Dwijendra Nath Gangopadhyay

Publication details
- History: 1955-present
- Publisher: Medknow Publications on behalf of the Indian Association of Dermatologists, Venereologists and Leprologists, West Bengal Branch (India)
- Frequency: Bimonthly

Standard abbreviations
- ISO 4: Indian J. Dermatol.

Indexing
- CODEN: IJDEAA
- ISSN: 0019-5154 (print); 1998-3611 (web)
- OCLC no.: 01715007

Links
- Journal homepage; Online access; Online archive

The Indian Journal of Dermatology is a bimonthly peer-reviewed open-access medical journal published on behalf of the Indian Association of Dermatologists, Venereologists and Leprologists, West Bengal Branch. The journal covers clinical and experimental dermatology, cutaneous biology, dermatological therapeutics, cosmetic dermatology, dermatopathology, and dermatosurgery.

It was established in 1955.

== Abstracting and indexing ==
The journal is abstracted and indexed in:

- Abstracts on Hygiene and Communicable Diseases
- CAB Abstracts
- EBSCO databases
- Excerpta Medica/EMBASE
- Expanded Academic ASAP
- Indian Science Abstracts
- IndMed
- ProQuest
- PubMed
- Scopus
- Tropical Diseases Bulletin
