= Reproductive and Developmental Medicine =

- Journal cover, vol. 8, issue 3
- Discipline: Obstetrics & Gynecology
- Language: English
- Edited by: Prof. XU Congjian

Publication details
- Former names: Journal of Reproduction and Contraception (English Edition)
- History: 2017–present
- Publisher: Lippincott Williams & Wilkins (United States)
- Frequency: Quarterly
- Open access: Yes
- License: Creative Commons Attribution-NonCommercial-NoDerivs
- Impact factor: 1.2 (2025)

Standard abbreviations
- ISO 4: Reprod. Dev. Med.

Indexing
- ISSN: 2096-2924 (print); 2589-8728 (web)

Links
- Journal homepage

Reproductive and Developmental Medicine is an international peer-reviewed journal that mainly reports the latest research in reproductive medicine and developmental biology. Published on a quarterly basis, the journal is co-sponsored by Chinese Medical Association, Obstetrics and Gynecology Hospital of Fudan University, and Shanghai Institute for Biomedical and Pharmaceutical Technologies. The editor-in-chief is Prof. XU Congjian (Obstetrics and Gynecology Hospital of Fudan University).

== Overview and history ==
Reproductive and Developmental Medicine is the first international academic journal in the field of reproductive medicine and developmental biology in mainland China. The journal, formerly known as the Journal of Reproduction and Contraception (English Edition) (ISSN 1001-7844) (Chinese name: 生殖与避孕（英文版）), was established in 1989 against the backdrop of China’s family planning policies. It was edited and published by the editorial office of Reproduction & Contraception (ISSN 0253-357X) (Chinese name: 生殖与避孕).

Starting on January 1, 2016, China’s one-child policy came to an end. In April of the same year, the State Administration of Press, Publication, Radio, Film and Television (SAPPRFT) of the People's Republic of China officially approved the renaming of the Journal of Reproduction and Contraception (English Edition) (ISSN 1001-7844) to its current title, Reproductive and Developmental Medicine (ISSN 2096-2924). At the same time, the journal’s governor was changed from the National Health and Family Planning Commission to the China Association for Science and Technology. Its sponsors were updated from the Shanghai Family Planning Research Institute to the Chinese Medical Association, Obstetrics and Gynecology Hospital of Fudan University, and Shanghai Institute for Biomedical and Pharmaceutical Technologies.

In 2017, Reproductive and Developmental Medicine began publication on the Medknow under Wolters Kluwer. Since 2022, the publisher has transitioned to the Lippincott Williams & Wilkins of Wolters Kluwer. No fees are charged for submissions, with Obstetrics and Gynecology Hospital of Fudan University covering the article processing charges (APC).

== Publishing scope ==
The journal primarily focuses on areas including reproductive endocrinology, reproductive immunology, gametogenesis, fertilization, embryo development and implantation, birth defects, reproductive genetics, reproduction biology, fertility preservation, andrology, genetic diagnosis, preimplantation genetic testing, germline stem cell research, but it generally excludes studies on reproductive system oncology.

== Abstracting and indexing ==
The journal is now indexed and abstracted by Web of Science’s Emerging Sources Citation Index (ESCI), Scopus, EMBASE, and Directory of Open Access Journals (DOAJ), and Chinese Science Citation Database (CSCD). It has a 2025 Journal Impact Factor of 1.2, ranking 114/143 in the category of Obstetrics & Gynecology.

== Most cited articles ==
Top 3 most cited articles ordered by the total citation numbers in Web of Science:

- Zheng, Qing-Liang; Duan, Tao; Jin, Li-Ping (January 2020). "Single-Cell RNA Expression Profiling of ACE2 and AXL in the Human Maternal-Fetal Interface". Reproductive and Developmental Medicine. 4 (1): 7–10. doi:10.4103/2096-2924.278679.
- Zhang, Shuo; Lei, Cai-Xia; Sun, Xiao-Xi; Xu, Cong-Jian (January 2020). "Current Status and Recent Advances in Preimplantation Genetic Testing for Structural Rearrangements". Reproductive and Developmental Medicine. 4 (1): 1–6. doi:10.4103/2096-2924.281855.
- Naz, Taniya; Chakraborty, Srinjoy; Saha, Sudipta (March 2022). "Role of fatty acids and calcium in male reproduction". Reproductive and Developmental Medicine. 6 (1): 57–64. doi:10.1097/RD9.0000000000000003.

== See also ==
- American Journal of Obstetrics and Gynecology
- Fertility and Sterility
- Gynecologic Oncology
