= Journal of Postgraduate Medicine =

- Discipline: Medicine
- Language: English

Publication details
- History: 1955-present
- Publisher: Medknow Publications (India)
- Frequency: Quarterly
- Open access: Yes
- Impact factor: 0.855 (2014)

Standard abbreviations
- ISO 4: J. Postgrad. Med.

Indexing
- ISSN: 0022-3859

Links
- Journal homepage

The Journal of Postgraduate Medicine is a multidisciplinary quarterly biomedical journal. The journal is the official publication of the Staff Society of Seth Gordhandas Sunderdas Medical College and King Edward Memorial Hospital, Mumbai, India.

The journal was established in 1955 with N.M. Purandare as its first editor-in-chief. It is published open access.

== Abstracting and Indexing ==
The journal is indexed and abstracted in Index Medicus, Current Contents, Science Citation Index, EMBASE, CAB Abstracts, and AMED.
