= CytoJournal =

- CytoJournal- Info with Home Page
- Discipline: Diagnostic Cytopathology, Molecular Cytopathology
- Language: English
- Edited by: Lester Layfield, MD; Vinod B. Shidham, MD, FIAC, FRCPath

Publication details
- History: 2004–present
- Publisher: ScientificScholar (USA)
- Frequency: Quarterly
- Open access: Open Access

Standard abbreviations
- ISO 4: CytoJournal

Indexing
- ISSN: 1742-6413
- OCLC no.: 56123679

Links
- Journal homepage

CytoJournal is a peer-reviewed PubMed-indexed open access online scientific journal on cytology that publishes research articles and information related to all aspects of diagnostic cytopathology, including topics such as molecular cytopathology. It is owned and supported by a non-profit organization (Cytopathology Foundation Inc, USA).

Broad areas of cytopathology covered include fine needle aspiration biopsy, Pap test (including Anal Pap), and serous fluids.

The journal was established in July 2004 and was published initially by BioMed Central and Medknow Publications. The Cytopathology Foundation moved it to a new platform in July 2020 and it is currently published by Scientific Scholar. The founding editors-in-chief were Vinod B. Shidham (Medical College of Wisconsin) and Barbara F. Atkinson (University of Kansas Medical Center). Atkinson has retired and continues as editor-emeritus. Other past editors-in-chief include Richard M. DeMay, MD (University of Chicago) and Martha B. Pitman, MD (Massachusetts General Hospital, USA). The current editors-in chief are Lester Layfield, MD (University of Missouri) and Vinod B. Shidham, MD, FIAC, FRCPath (Wayne State University School of Medicine) since 2020.

== See also ==
- Open Access Scholarly Publishers Association, of which CytoJournal is a member

== Sources ==
1. Shidham VB, Cafaro A, Atkinson BF. Editorial: CytoJournal joins 'open access' philosophy. CytoJournal 2004, 1:1 doi:10.1186/1742-6413-1-1 Click here for FREE access in open access

2. Frisch NK, Nathan R, Ahmed YK, Shidham VB. Authors attain comparable or slightly higher rates of citation publishing in an open access journal (CytoJournal) compared to traditional cytopathology journals - A five-year (2007–2011) experience. CytoJournal 2014,11:10. Click here for FREE access in open access
