= Association of Pharmaceutical Teachers of India =

- Abbreviation: APTI
- Formation: 1966
- Founders: Prof. M. L. Schroff and Prof G.P. Srivastava
- Type: Cooperative
- Purpose: Regulate education and pharmacy profession in India
- Headquarters: Bangalore
- Location: Al-Ameen College of Pharmacy, Opp. Lalbagh Main gate, Hosur Main Road, Bangalore, India - 560027.
- Region served: India
- Leader: Dr. P. G. Yeole
- Website: Official website

Association of Pharmaceutical Teachers of India (APTI) is an organisation of academics in India who teach in the area of pharmacy. It was established in 1966 by Prof. M. L. Schroff, Prof G.P. Srivastava and others of pharmacy colleges of those days.

Association of Pharmaceutical Teachers of India publishes popular scientific journal called Indian Journal of Pharmaceutical Education and Research.

Indian Journal of Pharmacy Practice is also another official journal of APTI

== State Branches of APTI ==
- APTI have 21 State Branches as follows
  - Andhra Pradesh
  - Assam
  - Chhattisgarh
  - Goa
  - Gujarat
  - Haryana
  - Himachal
  - Jharkhand
  - Karnataka
  - Kerala
  - Madhya Pradesh
  - Maharashtra
  - New Delhi
  - Orissa
  - Punjab
  - Rajasthan
  - Tamil Nadu
  - Telangana
  - Uttar Pradesh
  - Uttarkhand
  - West Bengal
