= Indian Journal of Critical Care Medicine =

- Discipline: Intensive-care medicine
- Language: English

Publication details
- History: 2003–present
- Publisher: Jaypee Brothers (India)
- Frequency: Monthly
- Open access: Yes

Standard abbreviations
- ISO 4: Indian J. Crit. Care Med.

Indexing
- ISSN: 0972-5229 (print); 1998-359X (web)
- LCCN: 2002296453
- OCLC no.: 53468219

Links
- Journal homepage

The Indian Journal of Critical Care Medicine is a peer-reviewed open-access medical journal published on behalf of the Indian Society of Critical Care Medicine. The journal publishes articles on the subject of critical and intensive care including emergency medicine.

== Abstracting and indexing ==
The journal is indexed with Abstracts on Hygiene and Communicable Diseases, Bioline International, CAB Abstracts, Caspur, CINAHL, DOAJ, EBSCO, EMCARE, Excerpta Medica/EMBASE, Expanded Academic ASAP, JournalSeek, Global Health, Google Scholar, Health & Wellness Research Center, Health Reference Center Academic, HINARI, Index Copernicus, OpenJGate, PubMed, Scimago Journal Ranking, SCOLOAR, Scopus, SIIC databases, Tropical Diseases Bulletin, and Ulrich's Periodicals Directory.
