= Indian Journal of Pharmaceutical Sciences =

- Discipline: Pharmaceutics
- Language: English

Publication details
- Former name: Indian Journal of Pharmacy
- History: 1939–present
- Publisher: OMICS International on behalf of the Indian Pharmaceutical Association (India)
- Frequency: Bimonthly
- Impact factor: 0.721 (2019)

Standard abbreviations
- ISO 4: Indian J. Pharm. Sci.

Indexing
- CODEN: IJSID
- ISSN: 0250-474X (print); 1998-3743 (web)
- OCLC no.: 04237329

Links
- Journal homepage; Online access; Online archive

The Indian Journal of Pharmaceutical Sciences is a bimonthly peer-reviewed open-access medical journal covering pharmaceutics, biopharmaceutics, pharmaceutical chemistry, pharmacognosy, pharmacology, pharmaceutical analysis, pharmacy practice, and clinical and hospital pharmacy. It is the official publication of the Indian Pharmaceutical Association. It was established in 1939 as the Indian Journal of Pharmacy, with M.L. Schroff as founding editor-in-chief.

== Abstracting and indexing ==
The journal is abstracted and indexed in:

- Abstracts on Hygiene and Communicable Diseases
- Biological Abstracts
- BIOSIS Previews
- CAB Abstracts
- Chemical Abstracts Service
- EBSCO databases
- Excerpta Medica/Embase
- Expanded Academic ASAP
- Global Health
- PubMed
- Science Citation Index Expanded
- Scopus
- Tropical Diseases Bulletin

According to the Journal Citation Reports, the journal has a 2015 impact factor of 0.762.
