= Indian Journal of Urology =

- Discipline: Urology
- Language: English

Publication details
- History: 1985–present
- Publisher: Medknow Publications on behalf of the Urological Society of India
- Frequency: Quarterly
- Impact factor: 1.0 (2025)

Standard abbreviations
- ISO 4: Indian J. Urol.

Indexing
- ISSN: 0970-1591 (print); 1998-3824 (web)

Links
- Journal homepage

The Indian Journal of Urology is a peer-reviewed open access medical journal published by Medknow Publications on behalf of the Urological Society of India. The journal cover research in urology, including oncology, sexual dysfunction, incontinence, endourology, trauma and reconstructive surgery, andrology, transplantation, imaging, and pathology.

== Abstracting and indexing ==
The journal is abstracted and indexed in:

- Abstracts on Hygiene and Communicable Diseases
- CAB Abstracts
- EBSCO databases
- Excerpta Medica/EMBASE
- Expanded Academic ASAP
- Pubmed Central
- Scopus

According to the Journal Citation Reports, the journal has a 2025 impact factor of 1.0.
