= Carolyn F. Ulrich =

American librarian (1881–1969)

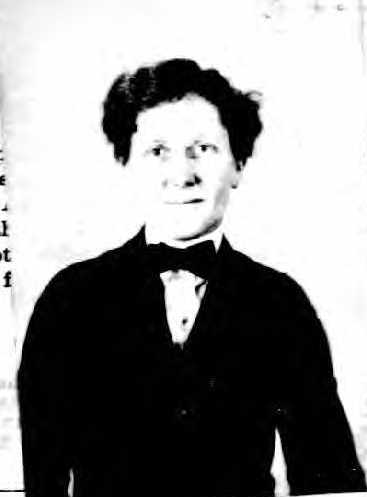
- Born: August 16, 1880. Oakland, California
- Died: November 22, 1969 (aged 89)
- Education: Pratt Institute
- Occupation: librarian
- Employer: New York Public Library
- Known for: created Ulrich's Periodicals Directory
- Family: Lina Linck and Rudolph Ulrich (parents)

Carolyn Farquhar Ulrich (August 16, 1880 – November 22, 1969) was an American librarian. She created the Ulrich's Periodicals Directory in 1932.

== Early life and education ==
Ulrich was born in Oakland, California, on August 16, 1880 to parents Lina Linck (Hartman) and Rudolph Ulrich. Her family later moved to New York and she enrolled in the Pratt Institute for one year.

== Career ==
Ulrich began working as assistant in the Brooklyn Public Library in 1906, with no formal library training. As a result, she attended the Albany Summer Library School during the summer of 1907 and remained an assistant at the Brooklyn library until 1912. In 1913 she became "first assistant," a position she held until 1917. In 1914, Marian Cutter and Ulrich travelled to Newfoundland and Labrador, Canada to help with the Grenfell Mission. They helped catalogue books and establish travelling libraries. Ulrich returned to the Pratt Institute to earn her certification in library studies. After graduating in 1918, she joined the staff at Bridgeport Public Library in Connecticut where she worked to develop travelling libraries to serve factory workers. In 1922, she was appointed chief of the periodicals division of the New York Public Library's Main Branch.

In 1932, as chief of the periodicals division of the New York Public Library, Ulrich published the Periodicals Directory: A Classified Guide to a Selected List of Current Periodicals Foreign and Domestic. This was the beginning of Ulrich's Periodicals Directory. She later Chaired the American Library Association (ALA) Periodicals Section and Join Committee on Standardization of Periodicals. In 1936, Ulrich was appointed to represent the American Standards Association on the International Standards Association Committee 46 on Documentation.

She died on November 22, 1969.

== Publications ==
In 1943, Ulrich and Karl Küp published "Books and Printing, a Selected list of Periodicals, 1800-1942." In 1946, she published "The Little Magazine, A History and a Bibliography" with Frederick J. Hoffman and Charles Allen.
