= Annals of Thoracic Medicine =

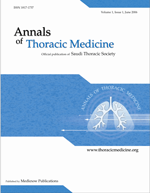
- Discipline: Pulmonology
- Language: English

Publication details
- History: 2006–present
- Publisher: Medknow Publications (India)
- Frequency: Quarterly

Standard abbreviations
- ISO 4: Ann. Thorac. Med.

Indexing
- ISSN: 1817-1737 (print); 1998-3557 (web)
- LCCN: 2008244001
- OCLC no.: 276089683

Links
- Journal homepage

Annals of Thoracic Medicine is a peer-reviewed medical journal published by the Saudi Thoracic Society through an agreement with the Wolters Kluwer brand Medknow Publications. The journal publishes articles on topics within thoracic medicine, which it defines as "pulmonology, cardiology, thoracic surgery, transplantation, sleep and breathing, airways disease, and more." All articles are open access and are distributed under a Creative Commons Attribution-NonCommercial-ShareAlike license. The journal was started as a semi-annual publication in 2005 and is now published quarterly.

Annals of Thoracic Medicine is indexed with DOAJ, EMBASE, EMR Index Medicus, Pubmed Central, SCImago Journal Rank, SCOPUS, Web of Science, and Science Citation Index Expanded.
