= Journal of Conservative Dentistry =

- Discipline: Dentistry
- Language: English

Publication details
- History: 1998; 28 years ago to present
- Publisher: Medknow Publications (India)
- Frequency: Quarterly

Standard abbreviations
- ISO 4: J. Conserv. Dent.

Indexing
- ISSN: 0972-0707 (print); 0974-5203 (web)
- LCCN: 2003243293
- OCLC no.: 318550305

Links
- Journal homepage; Online access; Online archive

The Journal of Conservative Dentistry is an open-access peer-reviewed medical journal first published in 1998 by Medknow Publications on behalf of the Federation of Operative Dentistry (India). The journal publishes articles on the subject of operative dentistry and endodontics aiming at restoration and replacement of teeth.

The journal is indexed with EBSCO Publishing’s Electronic Databases and PubMed.
