= Asian Journal of Andrology =

- Discipline: Andrology
- Language: English
- Edited by: Yi-Fei Wang

Publication details
- History: 1999-present
- Publisher: Shanghai Institute of Materia Medica
- Frequency: Quarterly
- Open access: Yes
- Impact factor: 3.259 (2017)

Standard abbreviations
- ISO 4: Asian J. Androl.

Indexing
- CODEN: ASJAF8
- ISSN: 1008-682X (print); 1745-7262 (web)
- LCCN: 00243423

Links
- Journal homepage; Online access; Online archive

The Asian Journal of Andrology is a quarterly peer-reviewed medical journal covering andrology. It was established in 1999 and is the official journal of the Asian Society of Andrology. An open access journal, it is published by the Shanghai Institute of Materia Medica and the editor-in-chief is Yi-Fei Wang (Shanghai Jiao Tong University).

== Abstracting and indexing ==
The journal is abstracted and indexed in:

- Chemical Abstracts
- EMBASE/Excerpta Medica
- Index Medicus/MEDLINE/PubMed
- Current Contents/Clinical Medicine
- CSA Life Sciences
- BIOSIS Previews
- CAB Abstracts
- CAB Health
- PASCAL
- Science Citation Index

According to the Journal Citation Reports, the journal has a 2017 impact factor of 3.259.
