= Indian Journal of Nephrology =

- Discipline: Nephrology
- Language: English
- Edited by: V. Sakhuja

Publication details
- History: 1991-present
- Publisher: Medknow Publications (India)
- Frequency: Quarterly
- Open access: Yes

Standard abbreviations
- ISO 4: Indian J. Nephrol.

Indexing
- ISSN: 0971-4065 (print); 1998-3662 (web)
- OCLC no.: 20293978

Links
- Journal homepage

The Indian Journal of Nephrology is a peer-reviewed open-access medical journal published on behalf of the Indian Society of Nephrology. The journal publishes articles on the subject of nephrology.

== Abstracting and indexing ==
The journal is indexed in Abstracts on Hygiene and Communicable Diseases, CAB Abstracts, EBSCO, Excerpta Medica/EMBASE, Expanded Academic ASAP, Global Health, Health & Wellness Research Center, Health Reference Center Academic, INDMed, MedIND, PubMed, Scopus, SIIC databases, and Tropical Diseases Bulletin.
