= Indian Journal of Pharmacology =

- Discipline: Pharmacology
- Language: English
- Edited by: Bikash Medhi

Publication details
- History: 1969–present
- Publisher: Medknow Publications (India)
- Frequency: Bimonthly
- Impact factor: 2.833 (2021)

Standard abbreviations
- ISO 4: Indian J. Pharmacol.

Indexing
- CODEN: INJPD2
- ISSN: 0253-7613 (print); 1998-3751 (web)
- LCCN: 2001227366
- OCLC no.: 04896540

Links
- Journal homepage; Online archive

The Indian Journal of Pharmacology is a bimonthly peer-reviewed open-access medical journal published Medknow Publications on behalf of the Indian Pharmacological Society. It covers clinical and experimental pharmacology.

== Abstracting and indexing ==
The journal is abstracted and indexed in Abstracts on Hygiene and Communicable Diseases, Biological Abstracts, BIOSIS Previews, CAB Abstracts, Chemical Abstracts, EBSCO databases, Excerpta Medica/Embase, Global Health, PubMed, Science Citation Index Expanded, and Scopus.
