= Indian Journal of Gastroenterology =

- Discipline: Gastroenterology
- Language: English
- Edited by: Uday C Ghoshal

Publication details
- History: 1982-present
- Publisher: Springer Nature on behalf of Indian Society of Gastroenterology (India)
- Frequency: Bimonthly
- Open access: Yes

Standard abbreviations
- ISO 4: Indian J. Gastroenterol.

Indexing
- ISSN: 0254-8860

Links
- Journal homepage

The Indian Journal of Gastroenterology is a peer-reviewed bimonthly medical journal covering gastroenterology. It is published by the Indian Society of Gastroenterology and is indexed and abstracted in Index Medicus, MEDLINE, and Excerpta Medica.

The journal was established in 1982. Past editors-in-chief include F.P. Antia, S.R. Naik, and Philip Abraham. The journal publishes Editorials, Original Articles, Review Articles, Short Reports, Clinical Case Reports, Case Snippets, Debates and Letters.
