= Indian Journal of Cancer =

- Discipline: Oncology
- Language: English

Publication details
- History: 1964-present
- Publisher: Medknow Publications on behalf of the Indian Cancer Society and Indian Society of Oncology (India)
- Frequency: Quarterly

Standard abbreviations
- ISO 4: Indian J. Cancer

Indexing
- CODEN: IJCAAR
- ISSN: 0019-509X (print); 1998-4774 (web)
- OCLC no.: 01752894

Links
- Journal homepage

The Indian Journal of Cancer is a peer-reviewed open-access medical journal published by Medknow Publications on behalf of the Indian Cancer Society, Indian Cooperative Oncology Network and Indian Society of Oncology. The journal is the oldest oncology journal from India and covers all aspects of oncology, including medical oncology, surgical oncology, radiation oncology, oncopathology, preventive oncology, public health. The journal is abstracted and indexed in PubMed and the Science Citation Index Expanded. It is brought out quarterly.
