= Indian Journal of Radiology and Imaging =

- Discipline: Radiology
- Language: English

Publication details
- History: 1991-present
- Frequency: Quarterly

Standard abbreviations
- ISO 4: Indian J. Radiol. Imaging

Indexing
- ISSN: 0971-3026 (print); 1998-3808 (web)

Links
- Journal homepage

The Indian Journal of Radiology and Imaging is a peer-reviewed open access medical journal published on behalf of the Indian Radiology and Imaging Association. It covers all aspects of radiology and medical imaging.

== Editor in Chief ==
Shyamkumar N Keshava Professor and Head, Department of Interventional Radiology Head, Division of Clinical Radiology www.cmch-vellore.edu Ida Scudder road, Vellore. India. 632004

== Abstracting and indexing ==
The journal is abstracted and indexed in Abstracts on Hygiene and Communicable Diseases, CAB Abstracts, CINAHL, EBSCO databases, EmCare, Excerpta Medica/Embase, Expanded Academic ASAP, and Scopus.
