= Pharmacognosy Reviews =

- Discipline: Pharmacognosy
- Language: English

Publication details
- History: 2007-present
- Publisher: Phcog.net
- Frequency: Biannual

Standard abbreviations
- ISO 4: Pharmacogn. Rev.

Indexing
- ISSN: 0973-7847 (print); 0976-2787 (web)

Links
- Journal homepage

Pharmacognosy Reviews is a peer-reviewed open-access medical journal published by Pharmacognosy Network Worldwide (Phcog.net). The journal publishes articles on the subject of pharmacognosy, natural products, and phytochemistry. It is indexed with Caspur, EBSCO, ProQuest, and Scopus.

Phcog.net appeared on Beall's list of predatory open-access journals from October 2012 through September 12, 2015.
