= Indian Journal of Pathology & Microbiology =

Indian Journal of Pathology and Microbiology
- Discipline: Pathology, microbiology
- Language: English
- Edited by: S. Satyanarayana

Publication details
- History: 1958-present
- Publisher: Medknow Publications (India)
- Frequency: Quarterly
- Open access: Yes
- License: Creative Commons BY-NC-SA 3.0
- Impact factor: 0.74 (2020)

Standard abbreviations
- ISO 4: Indian J. Pathol. Microbiol.

Indexing
- CODEN: IJPMDT
- ISSN: 0377-4929 (print); 0974-5130 (web)
- OCLC no.: 746947022

Links
- Journal homepage; Online access; Online archive

The Indian Journal of Pathology and Microbiology is a quarterly peer-reviewed open-access medical journal published on behalf of the Indian Association of Pathologists and Microbiologists. It was established in 1958 as the Indian Journal of Pathology and Bacteriology, obtaining its current title in 1965. It covers all aspects of pathology (including surgical pathology, cytology, and hematology), and microbiology (including bacteriology, virology, and parasitology).

== History ==
The founding editor-in-chief of the journal was Vanmali Saran Maglik (King George Medical College, 1958–1960).

Later editors were

H. I. Jhala (1961–1967),

Vulimiri Ramalingaswami (1968–1969),

H. D. Tandon (1970–1972),

B. K. Aikat (1973–1978),

H.I. Jhala (1979–1982),

S. Nagalotimath (1983–1987),

K. S. Ratnakar (1988–1992),

V. H. Talib (1993–1997),

S. K. Shahi (1998–2002),

Harsh Mohan (2003–2007),

Sathyanarayan (2008-2012),

Vatsala Mishra (2013- 2017)

Ranjan Agrawal (2018-2022)

Bharat Rekhi (2023-present)

== Abstracting and indexing ==
The journal is registered with the following abstracting partners:

Baidu Scholar, CNKI (China National Knowledge Infrastructure), EBSCO Publishing's Electronic Databases, Ex Libris – Primo Central, Google Scholar, Hinari, Infotrieve, National Science Library, ProQuest, TDNet, Wanfang Data

The journal is indexed with, or included in, the following:

DOAJ, EMBASE/ Excerpta Medica, Indian Science Abstracts, IndMed, MEDLINE/Index Medicus, Scimago Journal Ranking, SCOPUS, Science Citation Index Expanded, Web of Science

Impact Factor^{®} as reported in the 2020 Journal Citation Reports^{®} (Clarivate Analytics, 2021): 0.74
