= Journal of Indian Association for Child and Adolescent Mental Health =

- Discipline: Child psychiatry
- Language: English
- Edited by: Naresh Nebhinani

Publication details
- History: 2005-present
- Publisher: Indian Association for Child and Adolescent Mental Health (India)
- Frequency: Quarterly
- Open access: Yes

Standard abbreviations
- ISO 4: J. Indian Assoc. Child Adolesc. Ment. Health

Indexing
- ISSN: 0973-1342
- OCLC no.: 57669232

Links
- Journal homepage; Online access; Online archive

The Journal of Indian Association for Child and Adolescent Mental Health is a quarterly peer-reviewed medical journal covering child psychiatry. It is published by the Indian Association for Child and Adolescent Mental Health and edited by Naresh Nebhinani. The journal is abstracted and indexed in CINAHL, EMBASE, and Scopus.
