= Indian Journal of Medical Sciences =

- Discipline: Medicine
- Language: English
- Edited by: Ashish Gulia

Publication details
- History: 1947-present
- Publisher: Scientific Scholar on behalf of the Indian Journal of Medical Sciences Trust (India)
- Frequency: Triannual
- Open access: Yes
- License: CC-BY-NC-SA 4.0

Standard abbreviations
- ISO 4: Indian J. Med. Sci.

Indexing
- CODEN: INJMAO
- ISSN: 0019-5359 (print); 1998-3654 (web)
- OCLC no.: 56895690

Links
- Journal homepage; Online access; Online archive

The Indian Journal of Medical Sciences is a triannual peer-reviewed open access medical journal published by Scientific Scholar on behalf of the Indian Journal of Medical Sciences Trust. It covers clinical medicine, surgery, pharmaceutical, and basic medical sciences with emphasis on health problems and solutions relating to clinicians from the developing world. The editor-in-chief is Ashish Gulia (Tata Memorial Centre). The journal does not charge authors or authors' institutions for the submission, processing, and/or publication of manuscripts.

== Abstracting and indexing ==
The journal was abstracted and indexed in Index Medicus/MEDLINE/PubMed (1975-2013) and Scopus (1947-2013 and 2016-2017), but coverage was discontinued by both.
