= Neural Regeneration Research =

- Discipline: Neurology, neuroscience, neural stem cells
- Language: English
- Edited by: Kwok-Fai So, Xiao-Ming Xu

Publication details
- History: 2006-present
- Publisher: Publishing House of Neural Regeneration Research (China)
- Frequency: Monthly
- Open access: Yes
- Impact factor: 8.5 (2025)

Standard abbreviations
- ISO 4: Neural Regen. Res.

Indexing
- CODEN: NRREBM
- ISSN: 1673-5374 (print); 1876-7958 (web)
- OCLC no.: 173468424

Links
- Journal homepage; Online archive

Neural Regeneration Research is a peer-reviewed scientific journal covering research on neuroregeneration and stem cells. Topics covered include neural stem cells, neural tissue engineering, gene therapy, and minimally-invasive treatment of neurodegenerative diseases. It was established in 2006 and the editors in chief are Kwok-Fai So (University of Hong Kong) and Xiao-Ming Xu (Indiana University). The journal publishes the following types of papers: research and reports, techniques and methods, investigation and analysis, meta-analyses and reviews, evidence-based case reports, and perspectives.

== Abstracting and indexing ==
The journal is abstracted and indexed in BIOSIS Previews, Chemical Abstracts, Excerpta Medica, Institute of Scientific & Technical Information of China, Chinese Science Citation Database, Scopus, and the Science Citation Index Expanded.
