= Indian Journal of Pharmaceutical Education and Research =

- Discipline: Pharmaceutical sciences
- Language: English
- Edited by: M. Ahmed

Publication details
- History: 1967–present
- Publisher: Association of Pharmaceutical Teachers of India (India)
- Frequency: Quarterly
- Open access: Yes
- License: Creative Commons Attribution-NonCommercial-NoDerivatives 4.0
- Impact factor: 0.501 (2019)

Standard abbreviations
- ISO 4: Indian J. Pharm. Educ. Res.

Indexing
- CODEN: IJPEB3
- ISSN: 0019-5464
- OCLC no.: 01587097

Links
- Journal homepage; Online access; Online archive

The Indian Journal of Pharmaceutical Education and Research is a quarterly peer-reviewed open-access medical journal covering pharmaceutics, biopharmaceutics, pharmaceutical analysis, pharmacy practice, clinical pharmacy, and pharmacy education. It is published by the Association of Pharmaceutical Teachers of India and the editor-in-chief is M. Ahmed.

== Abstracting and indexing ==
The journal is abstracted and indexed in Chemical Abstracts Service, Embase, Science Citation Index Expanded, and Scopus. According to the Journal Citation Reports, the journal has a 2019 impact factor of 0.501.
