= D. N. Sharma =

Indian oncologist and author (born 1965)

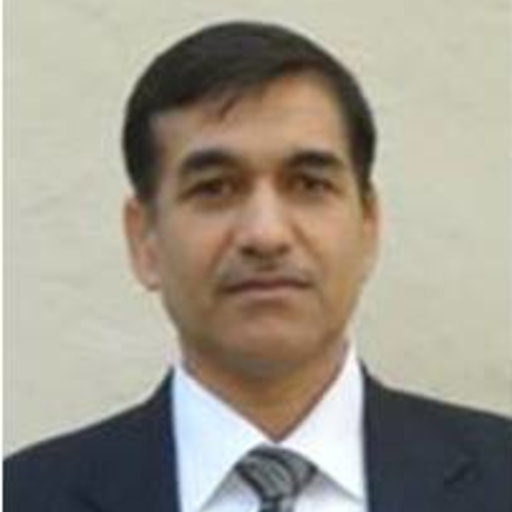
- Born: May 21, 1965 (age 61); Narnaul, Mahendragarh, Haryana (India)
- Citizenship: India
- Occupation: Radiation oncologist
- Organization: All India Institute of Medical Sciences, New Delhi
- Known for: Brachytherapy

Daya Nand Sharma (born 21 May 1965) is an Indian oncologist and author known for his contributions in the field of cancer treatment and especially in brachytherapy. He serves as the Executive Director at the All India Institute of Medical Sciences (AIIMS) Rewari and (AIIMS) Jammu. He is a President of Indian brachytherapy society.

== Life and career ==
Sharma was born in Narnaul, Mahendragarh, Haryana. He graduated in medicine at the Pandit Bhagwat Dayal Sharma Post Graduate Institute of Medical Sciences in 1987. He studied radiation oncology there until 1994. He also obtained a Diplomate of National Board degree in radiation oncology from the National Board of Examinations in 1998.

He joined AIIMS, New Delhi in 2003 and attained the position of professor and head. During his headship of the Department of Radiotherapy, the AIIMS administration issued a letter in November 2022 to abolish the practice of chemotherapy in his department. The letter cites a reason that "doctors of the radiotherapy department are often busy administering chemotherapy, which is also leading to lesser availability of their time for specific radiotherapy treatment."

== Honors and achievements ==
- Dr. Samir Desai Memorial Oration Award 2023
- Fellow of National Academy of Medical Sciences, 2021
- Dr. G. N. Agarwal Oration at King George's Medical University, 2017
- Fellow of Indian College of Radiation Oncology, 2017
- Visiting Professor Lecture at Loyola University Chicago, 2017
- Indian Council of Medical Research award for biomedical research, 2016
- Visiting Professor Lecture at Rutgers University, 2016
- Recipient of AIIMS Research Excellence Award 2014 (clinical category)
- Awarded UICC Fellowship twice and visited Washington University in St. Louis and Ohio State University in 1999 and 2007
- Accompanying Union Cabinet minister Rao Inderjeet for AIIMS Rewari visits
