= Indian Journal of Medical Research =

- Discipline: Biomedical research
- Language: English
- Edited by: Dr. Samiran Panda

Publication details
- History: 1913–present
- Publisher: Medknow Publications on behalf of the Indian Council of Medical Research (India)
- Frequency: Monthly
- Open access: Yes
- Impact factor: 4.2 (2022)

Standard abbreviations
- ISO 4: Indian J. Med. Res.

Indexing
- CODEN: IMIREV
- ISSN: 0971-5916
- OCLC no.: 475425104
- Supplements
- ISSN: 0367-9012

Links
- Journal homepage; Online access

The Indian Journal of Medical Research is a peer-reviewed open-access medical journal. It is published by Medknow Publications on behalf of the Indian Council of Medical Research. Since 1977, it has been published monthly with six issues per volume. The journal publishes original "technical and clinical studies related to health, ethical and social issues" in biomedical research as well as narrative and evidence-based review articles. The editor-in-chief is Samiran Panda who took up the position in July 2022. In addition to regular issues, the journal publishes special issues and supplements, with the latter published under a different ISSN.

== History ==
The journal was first established as a quarterly publication in July 1913, mostly continuing with this publication rate until it was made bimonthly in 1958 and then monthly in 1964. There was, however, a period during 1940 and then between 1943 and 1946 when it was published half-yearly. The number of issues per volume was reduced from 1977, with two volumes of six issues being published each year. In 1989, the journal was split into two parts: Section A dealt with publications on infectious diseases (OCLC 684369142) whilst biomedical research outside that area was published in Section B (OCLC 684475647). These sections were re-merged from 1994 but with a new ISSN (0971-5916 replaced ISSN 0019-5340), which remains in use today. The journal has been celebrating its centenary of publications between July 2012 and July 2013.

The inaugural editor of the journal was Sir Pardey Lukis (1857–1917), the Director-General of the Indian Medical Service (1910–1917), who served in both positions until his death.

== Abstracting and indexing ==
The journal is abstracted and indexed in:

- EBSCO databases
- MEDLINE/Index Medicus/PubMed
- Science Citation Index Expanded

According to the Journal Citation Reports, the journal has a 2022 impact factor of 4.2.
