= Indian Journal of Occupational and Environmental Medicine =

- Discipline: Occupational medicine, environmental medicine
- Language: English

Publication details
- History: 1997-present
- Publisher: Medknow Publications (India)
- Frequency: Triannual

Standard abbreviations
- ISO 4: Indian J. Occup. Environ. Med.

Indexing
- ISSN: 0973-2284 (print); 1998-3670 (web)
- LCCN: 98903285
- OCLC no.: 39288982

Links
- Journal homepage

The Indian Journal of Occupational and Environmental Medicine is an official peer-reviewed open-access medical journal published on behalf of the Indian Association of Occupational Health. The journal publishes articles on the subject of occupational and environmental medicine including epidemiology, ergonomics, carcinogenesis, biological monitoring, industrial hygiene, toxicology, applied psychology, and environmental chemistry. The journal is indexed by PubMed.
