= Journal of Global Infectious Diseases =

- Discipline: Medicine: Infectious Diseases
- Language: English

Publication details
- History: 2009-present
- Publisher: Wolters Kluwer Health (Philadelphia, PA)
- Frequency: 4 Issues

Standard abbreviations
- ISO 4: J. Glob. Infect. Dis.

Indexing
- ISSN: 0974-777X (print); 0974-8245 (web)

Links
- Journal homepage; Online archive

Journal of Global Infectious Diseases (JGID) is an international peer-reviewed journal affiliated with INDUSEM and OPUS 12 Foundation, Inc.

The journal publishes articles on the subject of Infectious Diseases, Microbiology including bacteriology, virology, mycology and parasitology, Immunology, Public Health, Critical Care, Epidemiology, Nutrition, Pharmacotherapeutics.

The journal is indexed with Caspur, DOAJ, EBSCO Publishing’s Electronic Databases, Expanded Academic ASAP, Genamics JournalSeek, Google Scholar, Health & Wellness Research Center, Health Reference Center Academic, Hinari, Index Copernicus, OpenJGate, PubMed, Pubmed Central, SCOLOAR, SIIC databases, Ulrich’s International Periodical Directory.

The journal allows free access (Open Access) to its contents and permits authors to self-archive the final accepted version of the articles on any OAI-compliant institutional / subject-based repository.

There are no page charges for submissions to the journal, but you may have to pay up to 650 USD prior to publication.
