= African Index Medicus =

International health literature database

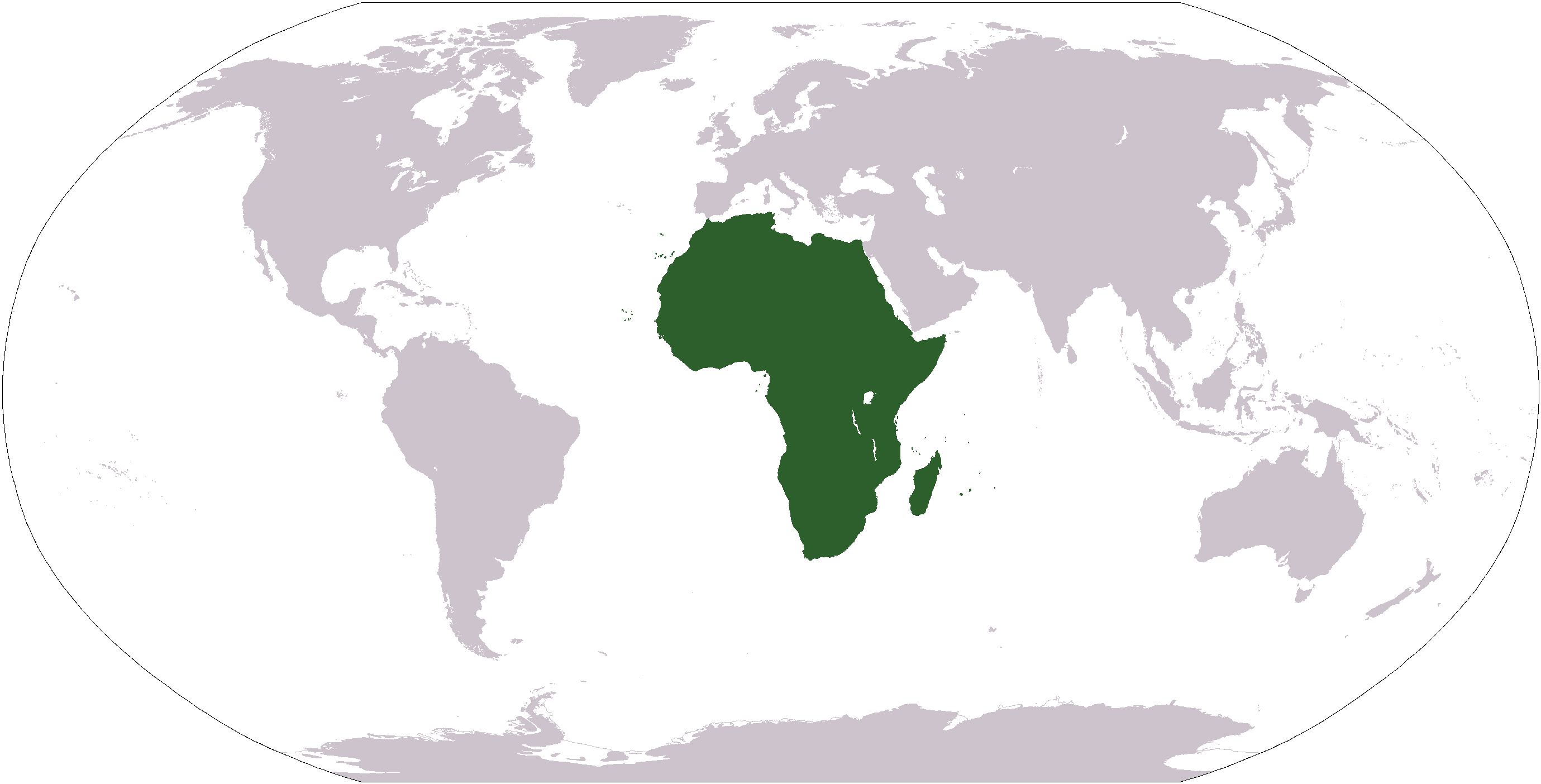
- Producer: WHO
- Languages: English, French, Portuguese

Coverage
- Disciplines: African health literature
- Geospatial coverage: Africa

Links
- Website: indexmedicus.afro.who.int

The African Index Medicus (AIM) is an international database to African health literature implemented by World Health Organization (WHO) and African partners. AIM makes available (on line) health information produced on Africa or by African researchers for health workers, policy makers and communities.

== Background ==
Establishing a regional database of health literature published in Africa (an African Index Medicus) was mandated by the Regional Committee by resolution AFR/RC30R5. In 1984, the work began on developing the database in AFRO but for various reasons was subsequently suspended.

The project was relaunched in 1993 following a consultation in Accra, Ghana, among African health information professionals, members of the Executive Committee of the Association for Health Information and Libraries in Africa (AHILA). and WHO technical staff.

== Objectives ==
The major objective of the AIM project is to provide access to information published in or related to Africa and to encourage local publishing. It aims to collect references of published and non-published health information relevant to the Region and not indexed elsewhere. The major challenges for this project are:

- To promote African publishing by encouraging writers to publish in their countries or regional journals
- To give greater visibility to health and biomedical research carried out in African countries
- To strengthen the South-South flow of information, especially among African countries
- To reduce the cost of information access for developing countries
- To integrate the African publications into international information networks
- To develop and encourage collaboration and information sharing in the region

== What is indexed in AIM? ==
- Grey literature
- Technical reports
- Theses and dissertations
- Medical journals (some with full articles)

== Which journals are indexed in the AIM? ==
All African Medical journals could be indexed in the AIM database. Articles on or related to Africa and published in other regional or international journals are indexed.

== Structure and management ==
The African Index Medicus Project is based at the World Health Organization Regional office for Africa. (Library) in Brazzaville, Congo. Data are provided by National focal points and African Medical Editors. Many of them are FAME (Forum of African Medical Editors) members. The information received by the IMA project team are indexed, cataloged, compiled and integrated into a database available on OPAC accessible from the website of the African Index Medicus.

== Partnership into international information networks ==
AIM is recognized by leading institutions and organizations as the main catalog of African health information. Therefore, the recommendations and / or referrals to the African Index Medicus, are present on the websites of many of these organizations, including international networks such as le CISMEF (France), universities such as the Stanford University, University of Alberta. Also the African and Malagasy Council for Higher Education (CAMES) recommends that African researchers and scientists to publish in journals indexed IMA to ensure the credibility of their issue.

== See also ==
- Index Medicus
