= SafetyLit =

- Preventing Injuries By Providing Information
- Producer: SafetyLit Foundation, Inc. (United States)
- History: Initiated in 1995
- Languages: English

Access
- Providers: Journal publishers, conference organizers, etc.
- Cost: Free

Coverage
- Disciplines: Agriculture, anthropology, archaeology, architecture, biology, business & public administration, chemistry, consumer product testing, criminology, demography, dentistry, economics, education, engineering specialties, epidemiology, ergonomics, faith scholarship, fire suppression & prevention, forensic specialties, genetics, geography, geology, history, industrial design, interior design, journalism, law & law enforcement, literature, mathematics, media studies, medicine, meteorology, nursing, occupational safety & hygiene, oceanography, pharmacology, philosophy, physics, physiology, political science & policy, psychology, public health, social work, sociology, sports & kinematics, statistics, theology, toxicology, transportation, urban planning, and other fields.
- Record depth: Index & Abstract
- Format coverage: Journal articles, reports, conference proceedings, theses
- Temporal coverage: Mid-17th century (1665) to present day
- Geospatial coverage: Global
- No. of records: Over 810,000 records (June 2024)
- Update frequency: Daily

Print edition
- Print title: SafetyLit Weekly Update Bulletin
- Print dates: 1995–present (available online 2000–present)
- ISSN: 1556-8849

Links
- Website: www.safetylit.org
- Title list(s): www.safetylit.org/week/journals.php

SafetyLit (short for "Safety Literature") is a bibliographic database and online update of recently published scholarly research of relevance to those interested in the broad field of injury prevention and safety promotion. Initiated in 1995, SafetyLit is a project of the SafetyLit Foundation in cooperation with the San Diego State University College of Health & Human Services and the World Health Organization – Department of Violence and Injury Prevention.

== Background ==
Like the US National Library of Medicine's (NLM) PubMed system, SafetyLit is a free service that is distributed without commercial messages. There are many online literature databases. Most are subscription-based, costly and are available only through a library. Typically, these databases focus on a specific scientific discipline. For example, PubMed has a bio-medicine focus, PsycINFO focuses upon behavioral issues, Compendex on engineering, etc.

While other bibliographic databases can focus upon the publications of only one or two professional disciplines, it has been known since the early 20th Century that issues relevant to safety research and policy development arise from many distinct disciplines. Thus, SafetyLit draws its content from many disciplines. Articles are selected that are relevant to the issues of injury prevention and safety promotion from over 16000 scholarly journals (as of November 2020) in the physical, biological and social sciences, as well as engineering, medicine, and the applied social sciences. SafetyLit also indexes selected doctoral theses and relevant technical reports from government agencies and NGOs.

=== History ===
The idea for SafetyLit came from an electronic mailing list service provided in the early 1990s by Sandra Bonzo and other librarians at the U.S. Centers for Disease Control and Prevention (CDC), National Center for Injury Prevention and Control (NCIPC). This bibliographic update was a printout of article citations from Medline that were indexed with selected MeSH terms related to the treatment and prevention of injuries. This free service was provided at a time when searching Medline was quite costly. The NCIPC update service ended in late 1994, about one year before the National Library of Medicine began providing an experimental version of PubMed.

To help fill the gap from that loss, SafetyLit began in early 1995 as a simple email message sent to about 20 people who were affiliated with the CDC-funded state Disability Prevention Programs in Louisiana and a few other U.S. states. The SafetyLit message omitted the treatment references to concentrate upon prevention. As more and more people learned about SafetyLit, the mailing list expanded. In June 1997 PubMed began to index the contents of journals beyond the restrictive Medline core. At that time SafetyLit began using PubMed as its source because 1) it was a free service; 2) its increased scope beyond Medline journals; and 3) improvements to the PubMed query system. By the end of 1998, with an administrative move from Louisiana to the San Diego State University, Graduate School of Public Health), the updates were circulated to more than 5000 subscribed addresses. By the close of 1999 the address list had expanded beyond 15,000.

During 1999, several publishing companies began supplying their journal article citation metadata and author's abstracts to SafetyLit and the journal sources expanded far beyond the bio-medicine material that was available through PubMed. In 2001 the SafetyLit update service moved from a series of lengthy flat-file newsletters to a database-driven dynamic website. The email newsletter became a simple announcement that a pdf version of Update Bulletin is available on the SafetyLit website. With that improvement, an archive database with search capacity was established. From that time forward, each week brought the addition of about 400-500 recently published articles and more than 150 articles from the back-files of journals that published relevant material.

In mid-2013, to sustain the contents of the languishing VioLit database, SafetyLit formed a partnership with the Center for the Study and Prevention of Violence (CSPV), a research program of the Institute of Behavioral Science (IBS) at the University of Colorado at Boulder. The VioLit database, had items related to preventing youth violence with most records including a thorough review written by CSPV experts. The VioLit expanded article reviews were added to existing SafetyLit records where there is overlap of the database contents and VioLit items that had been missing from SafetyLit were also added.

From 1998, through 2013 SafeyLit was supported by grants and contracts with several federal and California state agencies. The U.S. federal Budget sequestration in mid-2013 led to a loss of all federal funding and most of the California support that was available via U.S. Preventive Block Grant and Maternal and Child Health Block Grant support. With the loss of this revenue stream the SafetyLit Foundation was incorporated as a tax exempt organization to facilitate independent funding.

== Coverage ==
=== Sources ===
Although SafetyLit began with a focus upon articles from scholarly journals, in early 2013 it expanded to include books (and book chapters) and the gray literature (academic doctoral theses, reports from scientific research groups, working papers, etc.).

==== Scholarly Journals ====
Information about the 16,000-plus serials indexed in SafetyLit is found in the SafetyLit Journals Database that lists journal title and current publisher, title abbreviation, both the print and electronic International Standard Serial Number (pISSN and eISSN), the range of years the journal has been published, the journal's previous or subsequent titles, and a link to the journal's pages on the publisher's website. Each journal listing includes a link to the OCLC WorldCat find item in a nearby library service.

SafetyLit draws from journals that publish material that has been subjected to peer review. Most articles in SafetyLit are written in the English language or contain titles and abstracts in English. However, the abstracts of some non-English articles are included after translation to English by staff or volunteers. Titles and abstracts in the original language are retained. SafetyLit staff and volunteers regularly perform daily detailed searches of open-access databases such as the Global Index Medicus, PubMed, and Transportation Research International Documentation TRID Transportation Research Database. There are many relevant journals that are not included in these biomedicine and transportation databases. Thus, in addition, many publishers' journal websites are hand-examined (issue by issue). More than 1200 current scholarly journals from many nations are searched to find relevant material. The SafetyLit website provides a listing of the names of more than 200 journals with contents systematically examined each month and a listing of an additional 350 journals that are searched at least once every 3 months. The contents of another 1500 journals are examined at least once per year. SafetyLit provides a page with information about the public database search strategies and journal search frequencies.

==== Gray Literature ====
In mid-January 2013, SafetyLit announced that it was accepting submissions of academic doctoral theses on relevant topics (see below).In early February of that year, more than 150 theses from 18 universities had been added.

== Controversy ==
Researchers and policymakers who address controversial safety-related issues have been targets of threats or violence for hundreds of years from those with strong feelings who wish to obstruct certain knowledge for the basis of evidence-based policy. More recently, researchers and their institutions have come under attack for work in the areas of firearms and motorcycle helmets. These sorts of things are known because they have been the subject of editorials in journals and even print and broadcast news stories. However, providers of scholarly information such as SafetyLit have also been harmed by those who disagree with part of its content. Some SafetyLit readers write letters to the agencies and organizations that provide funding for the project. Others take more extreme action to make their point. Distributed denial of service (DDoS) attacks have been made against the SafetyLit servers. Other attackers organized their interest groups to subscribe to the SafetyLit email service and then to label the SafetyLit messages as unsolicited spam by using their internet service providers' automated reporting process. This in an unsuccessful attempt to block all users of that ISP from receiving SafetyLit email messages.

Some of the topics that bring the most complaints are not what might be expected:

- The single most controversial subject that generated the most letters and email messages were citations to articles that complainers believe promote bicycle helmet wearing. Throughout the years 2006–2007, SafetyLit received an average of 16.4 complaints each week that the Update Bulletin contained a citation to an article about bicycle helmets. (Articles about helmet laws are not counted here. Instead, they are included below under 'nanny government'.)
- The second-most controversial topic was any article concerning brain or spinal cord injury prevention. These complaints came from those who take an extreme view on issues of the rights of persons with acquired disabilities. They argued that efforts to prevent central nervous system injuries suggest that persons who have experienced these injuries are less valued than persons who are uninjured.
- Articles about 'nanny government' laws or regulations (14.3 complaints per week). These were complaints about issues such as: building codes; motor vehicle design standards and regulations (e.g. air bags, helmet laws, speed limits, cellular telephone prohibitions); consumer product risks and regulations.
- Articles they believed are biased in favor of firearm control regulations (14.1)
- Articles they believed are biased in opposition to firearm control regulations (11.6)
- Articles about an ethnic group or population they do not like (8.3)
- Articles about suicide prevention (5.2). The writers believed that suicide can be a good and rational choice—even for adolescents and younger children.
- Articles that reference psychology, human behavior, and risk-taking (5.0). The writers believed that these are biased in favor of psychology and psychiatry -- professions they believe are a threat to basic human rights and a danger to society.
- Articles about intimate partner violence (4.8). Correspondents said the problem is exaggerated, that most reported cases are exaggerations or lies, or that most times the physical aggression was provoked and deserved.
- Articles about alcohol and the risk of traffic crashes (4.7). The writers argued that people who drink and drive rarely have crashes and, when they do, it is not necessarily related to alcohol or that, for the many drivers who are tense and highly strung, alcohol relaxes them and they drive more safely.

== See also ==
- List of academic databases and search engines
