= JournalSeek =

Online database

- Producer: Genamics (United States)

Access
- Cost: Free

Coverage
- Disciplines: Academic journals
- Record depth: Journal description (aims and scope), journal abbreviation, journal homepage link, subject category, ISSN
- Format coverage: Journals
- Geospatial coverage: Worldwide
- No. of records: 98830 (as of 20 June 2012)

Links
- Website: journalseek.net

JournalSeek is an online database covering academic journals. It includes journals published by over 5400 publishers. The database includes journal descriptions and links to the journals' homepages.

== See also ==
- List of academic databases and search engines
