= Ulrich's Periodicals Directory =

Directory of periodicals

- Producer: ProQuest
- History: 1932–present
- Languages: Multi-lingual

Access
- Providers: Multi-platform
- Cost: Subscription

Coverage
- Disciplines: multidisciplinary (all subjects);
- Record depth: abstracting and indexing coverage, including print indexes, online indexes, and indexing and citation databases; from more than 400 global sources (including Scopus and ISI Web of Science)
- Format coverage: academic and scholarly journals (all types); open access publications, peer-reviewed titles; popular magazines, newspapers, newsletters; annuals, continuations, conference proceedings; trade publications, consumer magazines, newsletters and bulletins; limited selection of membership directories, comic books, puzzle and game books; titles that have ceased publication since 1974; irregularly published publications, regularly published publications, available free, and available paid subscription only; small publishers, large commercial publishers, scholarly society publishers, independent publishers, and not-for-profit publishers (90,000 publishers).
- Geospatial coverage: 215 countries (International-global)
- No. of records: 336,000+
- Update frequency: daily

Print edition
- Print title: Ulrich's
- Print dates: annual (limited data available compared to web)
- ISSN: 0000-2100

Links
- Website: about.proquest.com/en/products-services/Ulrichsweb

Ulrich's Periodicals Directory (ISSN 0000-0175, and ISSN 0000-2100) is the standard library directory and database providing information about popular and academic magazines, scientific journals, newspapers and other serial publications.

The print version has been published since 1932, and was founded by Carolyn F. Ulrich, chief of the periodicals division of the New York Public Library as Periodicals Directory: A Classified Guide to a Selected List of Current Periodicals Foreign and Domestic.

It is now also supplied online as Ulrichsweb, which provides web-based and Z39.50 linking to library catalogs. The online version includes over 300,000 active and current periodicals.

Coverage is international, with some emphasis on English-language publications. The information is derived from the publishers and verified by the journal. It includes

- ISSN
- Title and previous titles
- Starting date, place of publication, and publisher
- Cost, availability of electronic versions, subscription terms, and approximate circulation as estimated by the publisher
- Subject information, searchable as subject terms or approximate Dewey Classification, special features, and indexing information
- Indications of whether the publication is available on open access
- Indication of whether the publication is peer-reviewed, which is taken to include professional magazines with equivalent editorial control of quality.

Earlier published by R.R. Bowker, it moved to CSA, a fellow subsidiary of Cambridge Information Group, in 2006. Following the merger of CSA and ProQuest, Ulrich's moved to ProQuest subsidiary Serials Solutions. The "Serials Solutions" name was retired in 2014.

== See also ==
- List of academic databases and search engines
