= InfoTrac =

Full-text online database

- Producer: Gale (United States)
- History: 1985 to present
- Languages: primarily English

Access
- Cost: subscriptions

Coverage
- Record depth: Index, abstract & full text
- No. of records: over 20 million

Links
- Website: infotrac.cengage.com

InfoTrac is a family of full-text databases of content from academic journals and general magazines, of which the majority are targeted to the English-speaking North American market. As is typical of online proprietary databases, various forms of authentication are used to verify affiliation with subscribing academic, public, and school libraries. InfoTrac databases are published by Gale, a part of Cengage Learning.

InfoTrac was first publicly presented in January 1985 by Information Access Company (IAC) to library professionals at the American Library Association's annual conference in Washington, D.C. IAC began to roll out the system to subscribing libraries in the spring of 1985.

As of June 1987, the first-generation InfoTrac system cost about $20,000 and its database came on a 12-inch LaserDisc which was supposed to be updated every month. The original InfoTrac system was an immediate success at most of the libraries that tried it. One notable exception was the University of Wyoming, which tried the system for a few months and then returned it. Apart from frequent hardware and software crashes, the original InfoTrac software could only search Library of Congress subject headings (that is, it could not run a global search for keywords across all text on the disc), and the lack of a standard LaserDisc digital data format meant that the system would be rendered obsolete by the creation of such a format. By January 1988, the second-generation InfoTrac II system cost only $4,000 (for optical disc equipment, computer, monitor, and printer) and its database came on a CD-ROM.

As of 1994, InfoTrac databases continued to be published on CD-ROMs which were mailed to subscribing libraries at regular intervals. In that era, when personal computers were still relatively new, many publishers were not yet licensing full text of their articles, so most publications were represented only by article abstracts. This meant the InfoTrac family of products at their inception were primarily bibliographic databases as opposed to full-text databases. Furthermore, the personal computers typically used as InfoTrac terminals operated only in text mode, meaning that "full text" meant only text and not the article as originally published with photos and illustrations.

However, InfoTrac databases were published in coordination with various microfilm products from IAC which came on sequentially numbered auto-loading cartridges, on which individual frames were also individually numbered. Most InfoTrac abstracts and full-text articles from the 1980s and 1990s have a location code at the end of the article which points to the exact frame on a microfilm cartridge where the story begins, which a library user could use to obtain a copy of the article as originally published.

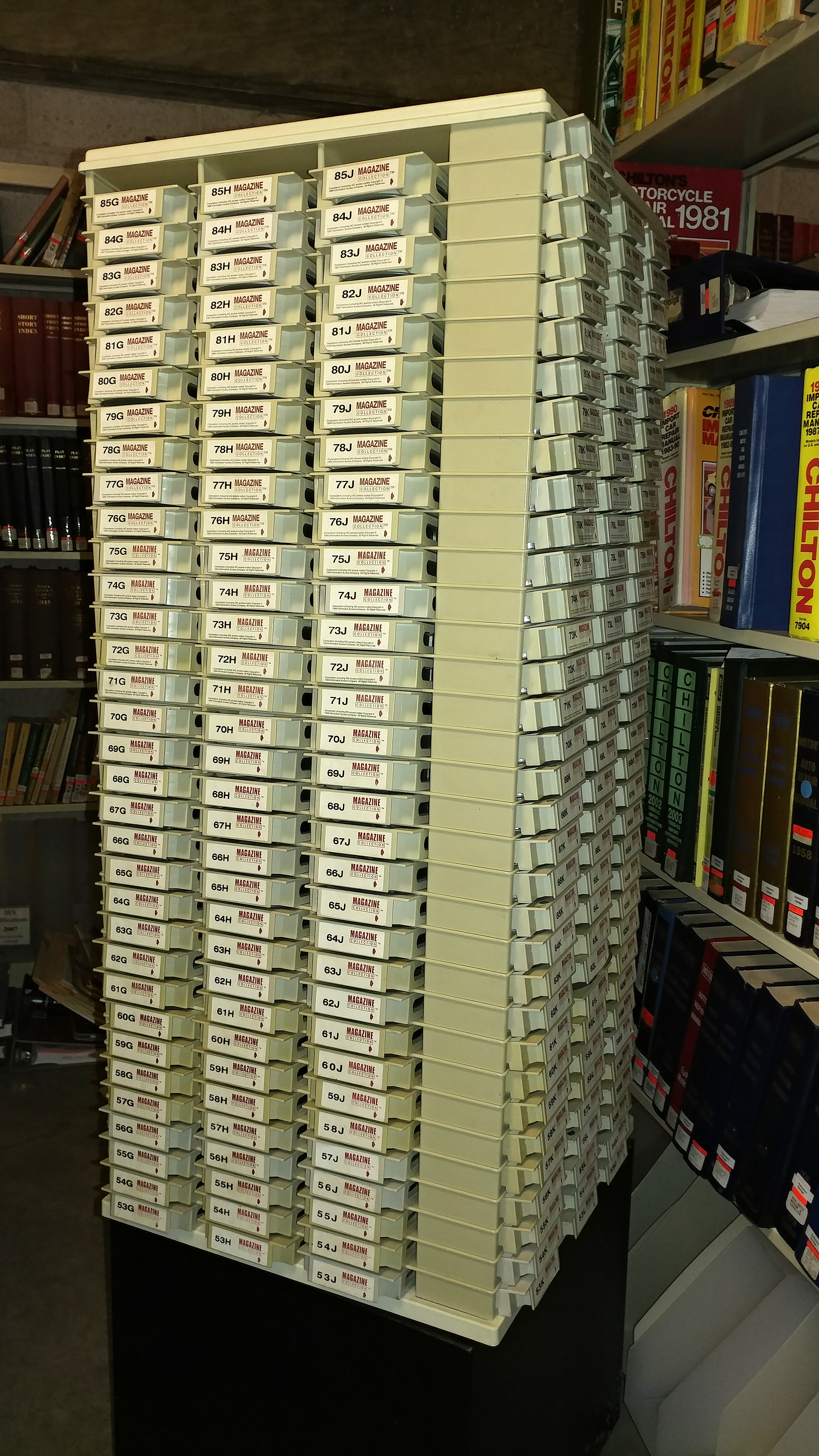
A rotating InfoTrac carousel

With each microfilm product subscription, IAC included a large rotating carousel with slots in which the cartridges could be stored for easy access, and also sold proprietary microfilm readers for its cartridges.

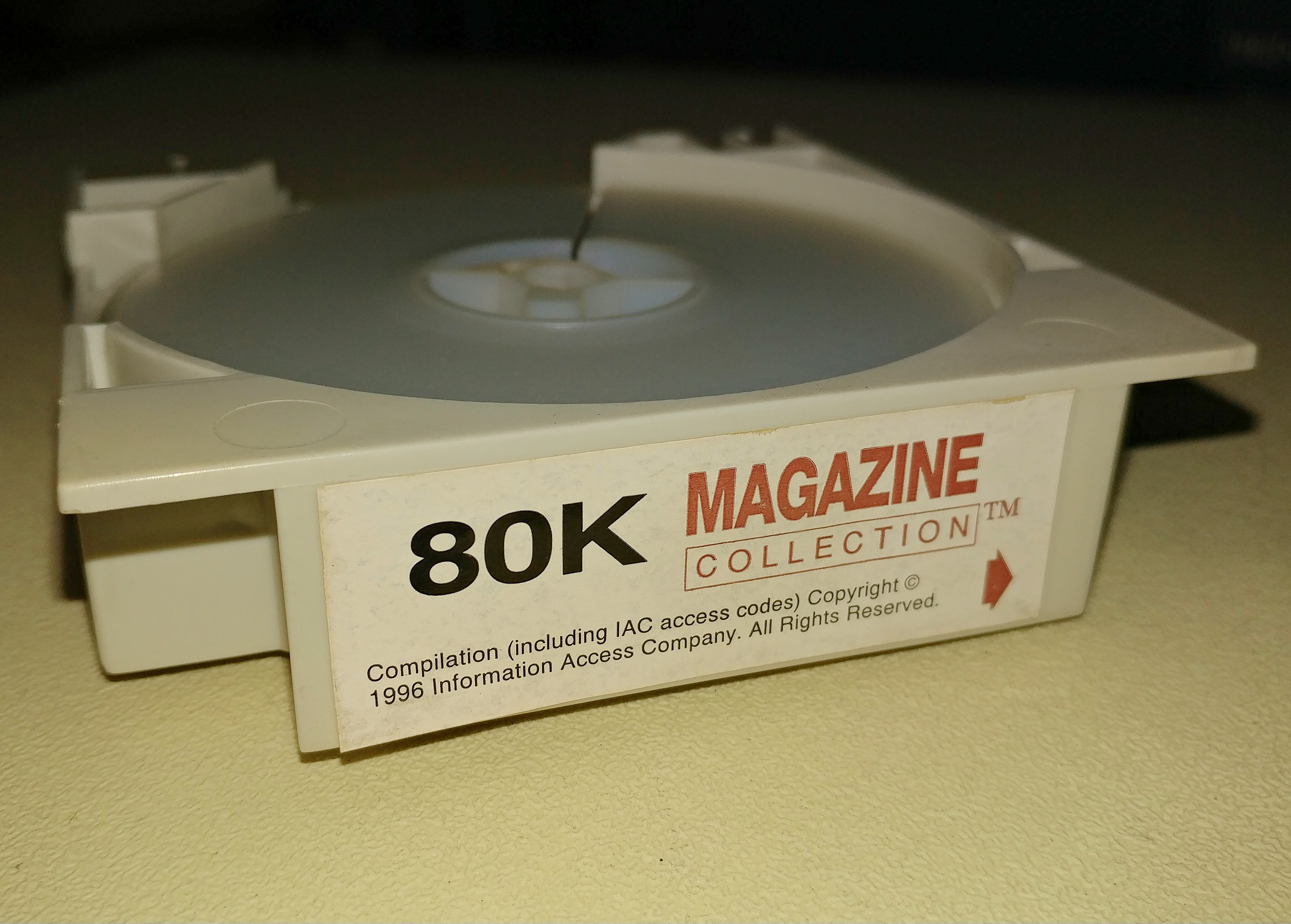
At the center of each InfoTrac cartridge was a reel of microfilm containing images of full magazine pages. The cartridges could be inserted in proprietary readers for automatic threading and rewinding.

The readers were able to automatically take up the loose end of the microfilm upon cartridge insertion after a second or two, while standard microfilm reels must be manually wound into a reader, which is much slower.

Thus, well-funded U.S. public libraries in the 1980s and 1990s typically had several InfoTrac database terminals, several carousels of IAC cartridges, and several microfilm readers. Researchers would use the database terminals to compile a list of all the cartridge-and-frame codes for all articles they were interested in, then they would pull the corresponding cartridges from the carousels and use printers built into the readers to make photocopies of the articles as originally printed.

IAC was acquired by The Thomson Corporation in 1995 and merged into sister company Gale in 1998. Like most database companies, Gale started offering real-time access to InfoTrac databases through a Web interface in the late 1990s (while simultaneously improving its full-text coverage). Around 2000, Gale began making scanned articles in PDF format directly available through the Web interface, thus relieving users of having to go to microfilm or hard copy to obtain as-published copies of articles.

The InfoTrac brand was relaunched in 2005 on a new technology platform named Thomson Gale PowerSearch.

== See also ==
- Search engine
- List of digital library projects
- List of online databases
