= Medknow Publications =

Scientific journal publisher

- Parent company: Wolters Kluwer
- Founded: 1997
- Country of origin: India
- Headquarters location: Mumbai
- Publication types: Academic journals
- Official website: www.medknow.com

Medknow Publications also known as Wolters Kluwer Medknow or simply Medknow, is a publisher of academic journals on behalf of learned societies and associations. Previously an independent Indian publisher, Medknow is now part of Wolters Kluwer's Health Division, under Wolters Kluwer India.

Medknow is not a member of the Open Access Scholarly Publishers Association. Some, but not all of its journals are listed in the Directory of Open Access Journals. The publisher briefly appeared on Beall's list in 2011, but was taken down, being described as "[a] publisher for many well-respected Indian professional societies and is disseminating abundant, high-quality research."

== History ==
Medknow Publications was founded in 1997 in Mumbai, India by Devkumar Sahu. Sahu opted for the open access model of publishing services. In 2006, Medknow had 33 scientific technical and medical journals in its portfolio, at the time, one of the largest open access publishers of medical content in India.

Medknow was acquired by Wolters Kluwer in December 2011, extending its publishing partnerships in China, the Middle East, and other regions. As of August 2016, Medknow publishers over 370 medical society journals in over 40 specialties.

In 2013, John Bohannon submitted a fake paper to the Journal of Natural Pharmaceuticals, published by Medknow, as part of the Who's Afraid of Peer Review? sting investigating open-access publishing. The journal accepted the fake paper, and was subsequently closed by Wolters Kluwer, citing 'deep concerns'. Many Medknow journal websites are now hijacked by spam websites rendering the journals inaccessible.

== See also ==
- List of Medknow Publications academic journals
