= List of pharmaceutical sciences journals =

This is a list of notable medical and scientific journals that publish articles in pharmacology and the pharmaceutical sciences.

- The AAPS Journal
- AAPS PharmSciTech
- Acta Pharmacologica Sinica
- Advanced Drug Delivery Reviews
- American Journal of Health-System Pharmacy
- American Journal of Pharmaceutical Education
- The Annals of Pharmacotherapy
- Annual Review of Pharmacology and Toxicology
- Asian Journal of Pharmaceutics
- Biochemical Pharmacology
- BioImpacts
- Biomedicine & Pharmacotherapy
- British Journal of Clinical Pharmacology
- British Journal of Pharmacology
- Canadian Pharmacists Journal
- China Pharmacy
- Clinical Pharmacokinetics
- Clinical Pharmacology & Therapeutics
- Clinical Therapeutics
- Current Drug Delivery
- Current Drug Metabolism
- Current Opinion in Pharmacology
- Current Pharmaceutical Design
- Current Trends in Biotechnology and Pharmacy
- DARU Journal of Pharmaceutical Sciences
- Drug Delivery
- Drug Design, Development and Therapy
- Drug Development and Industrial Pharmacy
- Drug Discovery Today
- Drug, Healthcare and Patient Safety
- Drug Safety
- Drug Metabolism Reviews
- Drug Testing and Analysis
- European Heart Journal - Cardiovascular Pharmacotherapy
- European Journal of Pharmaceutical Sciences
- European Journal of Pharmaceutics and Biopharmaceutics
- European Journal of Pharmacology
- Expert Opinion on Biological Therapy
- Expert Opinion on Drug Delivery
- Expert Opinion on Drug Discovery
- Expert Opinion on Drug Metabolism & Toxicology
- Expert Opinion on Drug Safety
- Expert Opinion on Emerging Drugs
- Expert Opinion on Investigational Drugs
- Expert Opinion on Pharmacotherapy
- Expert Opinion on Therapeutic Patents
- Expert Opinion on Therapeutic Targets
- Frontiers in Drug Delivery
- Frontiers in Drug Discovery
- Frontiers in Molecular Medicine
- International Journal of Pharma and Bio Sciences
- Frontiers in Pharmacology
- Indian Journal of Pharmaceutical Sciences
- Indian Journal of Pharmacology
- International Journal of Clinical Pharmacy
- International Journal of Nanomedicine
- International Journal of Neuropsychopharmacology
- International Journal of Pharma and Bio Sciences
- International Journal of Pharmaceutics
- Journal of Biomedical Nanotechnology
- The Journal of Clinical Pharmacology
- Journal of Controlled Release
- Journal of Ethnopharmacology
- Journal of Generic Medicines
- Journal of Microencapsulation
- Journal of Oncology Pharmacy Practice
- Journal of Pharmacy Practice
- Journal of Pharmaceutical Sciences
- Journal of Pharmacy and Bioallied Sciences
- Journal of Pharmacy and Pharmaceutical Sciences
- Journal of Pharmacy and Pharmacology
- Journal of Pharmacy Practice
- Journal of Pharmacy Practice and Research
- Journal of the American Pharmacists Association
- Molecular Pharmaceutics
- Nature Reviews Drug Discovery
- Neuropharmacology
- Pharmaceutical Development and Technology
- The Pharmaceutical Journal
- Pharmaceutical Research
- Pharmacognosy Communications
- Pharmacognosy Magazine
- Pharmacognosy Research
- Pharmacognosy Reviews
- Pharmacological Research
- Pharmacological Reviews
- Pharmacology & Therapeutics
- Pharmacotherapy
- Physiology, Physiological Chemistry, Pharmacology
- Phytotherapy Research
- Scientia Pharmaceutica
- Therapeutic Advances in Drug Safety
- Trends in Pharmacological Sciences

== See also ==
- Lists of academic journals
