= Geir Bjørklund =

Norwegian science writer

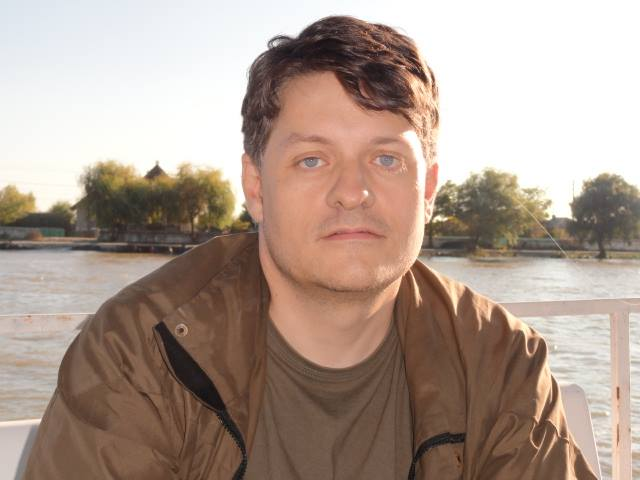
- Born: 20 April 1969 (age 57); Mo i Rana, Norway
- Occupations: Researcher and president of the Council for Nutritional and Environmental Medicine

Geir Bjørklund (born 20 April 1969 in Mo i Rana, Norway) is a medically trained researcher, health science writer, and scientific advisor. His research covers environmental medicine, toxicology, trace element metabolism, and neurobiology, with particular attention to how nutritional and environmental factors affect human health.

== Research and publishing ==
In the early 1990s, Bjørklund investigated occupational health risks associated with mercury exposure in dentistry. In the late 1990s, he had consulting assignments for the Norwegian Board of Health (Statens helsetilsyn). He was co-author of two of their reports on the use of dental filling materials.

In 1995, Bjørklund founded Tenner & Helse, the membership magazine of Forbundet Tenner og Helse (Norwegian Dental Patient Association), and was its editor until the summer of 1999. In the 1990s, he was also a freelance journalist for Sunnhetsbladet, a Norwegian health magazine. In 2001, Bjørklund founded the Nordic Journal of Biological Medicine, which was published until 2003.

In 2013, he founded and became president of the Council for Nutritional and Environmental Medicine (CONEM), an international nonprofit organization based in Norway. Through CONEM, Bjørklund has collaborated with researchers in numerous countries, including Ukraine, Russia, Kazakhstan, Egypt, and Saudi Arabia. In Ukraine, he has collaborated with researchers in pharmaceutical sciences. Bjørklund is also a board member of Tandhälsoförbundets Forskningsstiftelse (Swedish Dental Health Association Research Foundation), which supports research on dental health, biocompatible dental materials, and clinical treatment methods.

His scientific work has also addressed autism spectrum disorder (ASD), including research on zinc, copper, and other essential trace elements. Bjørklund has also examined possible associations between ASD and exposure to toxic metals and metalloids, including lead, mercury, aluminum, and arsenic. He serves on the editorial board of the International Journal for Autism Challenges & Solution, an Arabic–English journal dedicated to autism research.

Bjørklund collaborated with researchers in Kazakhstan to investigate the health effects of exposure to radioactive fallout from the former Semipalatinsk Test Site. Findings from this research, including an association between historical radiation exposure and hypertension, were discussed in Nature in 2019.

In 2023, Bjørklund was appointed honorary professor at Semey Medical University in Kazakhstan and Samarkand State Medical University in Uzbekistan.

In January 2024, he was quoted in BBC Future on the link between nutritional deficiencies and fatigue, emphasizing the role of essential nutrients in energy metabolism. His research has also addressed myalgic encephalomyelitis/chronic fatigue syndrome and fibromyalgia, including metal sensitivity and potential nutritional interventions.

Bjørklund has been included annually since 2020 in the Stanford–Elsevier Top 2% Scientists database. According to TopSciNet, he ranked 15th worldwide in Medicinal & Biomolecular Chemistry in the 2026 single-year citation ranking.

== Academic journals ==
Bjørklund is an associate editor of Metabolic Brain Disease, an advisory editor of Archives of Toxicology, and a section editor of Current Medicinal Chemistry and Current Pharmaceutical Design. He also serves on the editorial boards of Biological Trace Element Research, Cellular and Molecular Life Sciences, and Pharmaceuticals, as well as on the Food Chemistry section editorial board of Molecules. Bjørklund is a member of the World Association of Medical Editors.
