= Jonathan Baell =

Australian medicinal chemist

Jonathan Baell (né Ball) is trained as an Australian medicinal chemist and is currently executive director, early leads chemistry at Lyterian Therapeutics in San Francisco. Prior to this, he was a research professor in medicinal chemistry at the Monash Institute of Pharmaceutical Sciences (MIPS), the director of the Australian Translational Medicinal Chemistry Facility and a Chief Investigator at the ARC Centre for Fragment-Based Design. He was President of the International Chemical Biology Society 2018-2021 and is currently chair of the board. His research focuses on the early stages of drug discovery, including high-throughput screening (HTS) library design, hit-to-lead and lead optimization for the treatment of a variety of diseases, such as malaria and neglected diseases.

== Early life and education ==
Baell was born in Tanzania, East Africa in 1965. He migrated with his family to Tasmania, Australia in 1977. Baell completed a Bachelor of Science with Honours from the University of Tasmania in 1986. He then moved to Melbourne to undertake a PhD project with Professor Peter Andrews and Professor Paul Alewood at the Monash University Faculty of Pharmacy and Pharmaceutical Sciences (previously known as the Victorian College of Pharmacy), graduating in 1992.

== Career ==
At the completion of his PhD, Baell commenced his postdoctoral research at the Commonwealth Scientific and Industrial Research Organisation (CSIRO), quickly rising to the rank of senior research scientist at the age of 28.

In 2001, Baell moved to the Walter and Eliza Hall Institute (WEHI), where he served as the Head of Medicinal Chemistry for the subsequent decade. During this time, Baell published a paper in the Journal of Medicinal Chemistry describing a naturally occurring chemical derived from Ammi visnaga, khellinone, as the basis of a potential new class of immunosuppressive drugs for the treatment of multiple sclerosis. This area of research won him the Biota Award for Medicinal Chemistry from the Royal Australian Chemical Institute (RACI) in 2004.

After 10 years at WEHI, Baell moved his research lab to MIPS, where he was appointed as a research professor in 2012.

Baell coined the term PAINS (pan-assay interference compounds) to describe chemical compounds that are often picked up as false positive hits from HTS campaigns. His 2010 publication identified the chemical structures of these compounds and constructed electronic filters that can be used in HTS campaigns to remove PAINS from screening hits. The implications of PAINS in the drug discovery pipeline resulted in the American Chemical Society to include the removal of PAINS from screening hits as a publication requirement for its journals in 2017. The impact of Baell's work on PAINS was recognized in 2020 when he was presented the Scientific Achievement Award in Drug Discovery and Development by the American Society for Pharmacology and Experimental Therapeutics.

In 2018, Baell was awarded the Adrien Albert Award by RACI. It is the most prestigious award for RACI Medicinal Chemistry & Chemical Biology Division, given for exceptional research in the field of medicinal chemistry, agricultural chemistry or chemical biology.

=== Other appointments ===
- Board Member of the International Chemical Biology Society
- Scientific Advisory Board Member of Compounds Australia
- Scientific Advisory Board Member of Novick Biosciences
- Scientific Advisory Board Member of Regen BioPharma, Inc.
- Scientific Advisory Board Member of TopoGEN, Inc.
- Scientific Advisory Board Member of SEngine Precision Medicine
- Senior Editor of Future Medicinal Chemistry
- Editorial Advisory Board Member of Journal of Medicinal Chemistry
- Editorial Advisory Board Member of MDPI Methods and Protocol
- Editorial Advisory Board Member of MDPI Biology
- Editorial Advisory Board Member of Bentham Current Medicinal Chemistry
- Committee member of IUPAC Sub-committee for Drug Discovery and Development

== Awards and honors ==
2004 - Biota Award for Medicinal Chemistry, RACI

2018 - Adrien Albert Award, RACI

2019 - Faculty Research Award, Monash University Faculty of Pharmacy and Pharmaceutical Sciences

2020 - Scientific Achievement Award in Drug Discovery and Development, ASPET

== Patents ==
According to the Espacenet database, Baell has registered 49 patents as of July 2020.
