= Drug testing (disambiguation) =

Drug testing may refer to:

- Clinical trial
- Drug test
- Drug Testing and Analysis (journal)
- Equine drug testing
- Drug reaction testing
- Drug checking
- Drug Testing (The Office)
- Drug testing reagents (category)
