= Anatoly Skalny =

Russian scientist

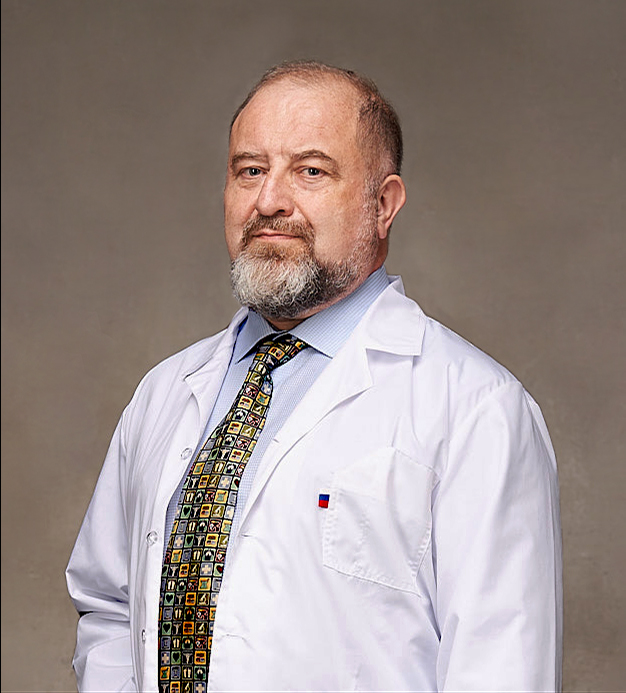
- Born: Анатолий Викторович Скальный; 12 May 1962; Ivano-Frankivsk, Ukrainian SSR
- Education: Ivano-Frankivsk National Medical University
- Awards: Vladimir Vernadsky National Ecology Award (2016)
- Scientific career
- Fields: Medicine, Bioelementology
- Workplaces: Peoples' Friendship University of Russia; Institute of Bioelementology of Orenburg State University; Trace-element-Institute for UNESCO

Anatoly Viktorovich Skalny (born 12 May 1962) is a Russian physician and biomedical scientist in the field of trace elements, founder of the Bioelementology scientific school. Doctor of Sciences in Medical Sciences, Prof., head of the Medical Elementology Department of the Peoples' Friendship University of Russia (RUDN University), Vice President of the Trace Element Institute for UNESCO, head of the Laboratory of Molecular Dietetics of the First Moscow State Medical University, director of the Institute of Bioelementology of the Orenburg State University, founder of the Center for Biotic Medicine and сhairman of the Russian Society of Trace Elements in Medicine (RUSTEM).

== Life and work ==
Anatoly Skalny was born in Ivano-Frankivsk, Ukrainian SSR. He graduated with honors from Ivano-Frankivsk National Medical University in 1985 and started working for the Serbsky State Scientific Center for Social and Forensic Psychiatry in the Cerebral Palsy department.

In 1990 Skalny attained a Candidate of Sciences degree defending a thesis in the field of Addiction Medicine (“Study of the effect of chronic alcohol intoxication on the metabolism of zinc, copper and lithium in the body”). In 2000 he attained a Doctor of Medical Sciences degree for his dissertation “Ecological and physiological rationale of the effectiveness of the use of macro - and micronutrients in disorders of homeostasis in the examined from various climatic and geographical regions. The feasibility study from the ecological and physiological point of view”.

In 2003 Skalny founded the world's first Bioelementology Institute under the support of Orenburg State University's rectorate, RUSTEM and UNESCO.

In the first decade of the 21st century, Anatoly Skalny researched the biological role of various macro and trace elements. He worked on developing methods and forms of using macro and trace elements to effectively treating various human metabolism disorders.

From 2005 to 2013, Skalny was a doctor of the professional tennis player Maria Sharapova.

In 2012 Skalny became the Vice President of Special Projects of the Trace Element Institute for UNESCO (TEU). TEU's main objective is to develop and promote new technologies aimed at diagnosis and correction of mineral and trace element deficiencies in humans and animals, as well as trace element overload of natural, anthropogenic, and iatrogenic origins.

RUDN University's Department of Medical Elementology was established with Skalny's active participation in April 2016. It is developing a methodological basis for studying trace elements and mineral metabolism in humans. Another area of research is studying the effect of the elements’ imbalance on the development of various diseases.

Anatoly Skalny organized a large-scale study of the trace element status of the Russian Federation's population. Based on the obtained data, a detailed map of the country's regions was developed and published in a five-volume monograph series (“Element status of Russia”). The revealed imbalance of elements is useful for the diagnosis, prediction, and treatment of many diseases.

Anatoly Skalny is an editorial board member in two journals in the field of trace elements research: Journal of Trace Elements in Medicine and Biology and Biological Trace Element Research.

Skalny is a popularizer of science. For example, Skalny participated in a debate with Russian biologist and science popularizer Alexander Panchin. Skalny is also a frequently invited expert in various TV projects.

== Awards ==
Vladimir Vernadsky National Ecology Award for the “Element status of Russia” project (Science for Ecology nomination), 2016.

== Selected works in English ==
- Keen C.L, Uriu-Adams J.Y., Skalny A., Grabeklis A., Grebeklis S., Green K., Yevtushok L., Wertelecki W. W., ChambersCh.D. The plausibility of maternal nutritional status being a contributing factor to the risk for fetal alcohol spectrum disorders: The potential influence of zinc status as an example // BioFactors (Oxford, England). — 2010. — V. 36 (2). — P. 125–135.
- Skalny, A. V., Skalnaya, M. G., Grabeklis, A. R., Skalnaya, A. A., &Tinkov, A. A. (2018). Zinc deficiency as a mediator of toxic effects of alcohol abuse. European journal of nutrition, 1-10.
- Bjørklund, G., Skalny, A. V., Rahman, M. M., Dadar, M., Yassa, H. A., Aaseth, J., ... &Tinkov, A. A. (2018). Toxic metal (loid)-based pollutants and their possible role in autism spectrum disorder. Environmental research, 166, 234–250.
- Skalny A.V. Bioelementology as an interdisciplinary, integrative approach in life sciences: Terminology, classification, perspectives // Journal of Trace Elements in Medicine and Biology. — 2011. — V.25. — P.3-10.
- Tinkov, A. A., Filippini, T., Ajsuvakova, O. P., Aaseth, J., Gluhcheva, Y. G., Ivanova, J. M., ... &Skalny A.V. (2017). The role of cadmium in obesity and diabetes. Science of the Total Environment, 601, 741–755.
- Skalny, A. V., Simashkova, N. V., Klyushnik, T. P., Grabeklis, A. R., Bjørklund, G., Skalnaya, M. G., ... &Tinkov, A. A. (2017). Hair toxic and essential trace elements in children with an autism spectrum disorder. Metabolic brain disease, 32(1), 195–202.
