= Nanomedicine (disambiguation) =

Nanomedicine is the medical application of nanotechnology.

Nanomedicine may also refer to:

- Nanomedicine (Elsevier journal), ISO 4 abbreviation Nanomedicine, established in 2005; also known as Nanomedicine: Nanotechnology, Biology and Medicine
- Nanomedicine (Future Medicine journal), ISO 4 abbreviation Nanomedicine (Lond.), established in 2006
