= Leaf Huang =

Leaf Huang is a Fred Eshelman Distinguished Professor in the UNC Eshelman School of Pharmacy and a Professor UNC/NC State joint Biomedical Engineering department. He has authored and co-authored over 570 peer reviewed articles and as of 2017 carries an h-index of 138.

== Biography ==
Huang is the Fred Eshelman Distinguished Professor, in the Eshelman School of Pharmacy, University of North Carolina at Chapel Hill. Huang’s research has been in the area of gene therapy and targeted drug delivery. He has pioneered the liposome non-viral vector and has designed and manufactured the cationic lipid vector for the first non-viral clinical trial in 1992. He was also the first to publish the activity of polyethylene glycol (PEG) in prolonging the circulation time of liposomes. His current work centers on nanoparticle vectors for gene transfer in tumor and liver. He also continues research in establishing a ligand targeted delivery system for cDNA, mRNA, siRNA, proteins and peptides for tumor growth inhibition and for vaccines in treating cancer and infected diseases. He has authored or co-authored more than 600 papers with an H-index of 137. He is also the inventor or co-inventor of 22 US and foreign patents. In 2004, he received the Alec D. Bangham MD FRS Achievement Award, which is the highest honor in liposome research. He was the recipient of the 2013 Distinguished Pharmaceutical Scientist Award which is the highest scientific recognition of the American Association of Pharmaceutical Scientists. He was named a Highly Cited Researcher in “Pharmacology & Toxicology” and then in “Cross Field” each year since 2016. Huang has also co-founded 6 biotech start-ups in the past.
