= Medicinal Chemistry (disambiguation) =

Medicinal chemistry is a discipline involving chemistry and pharmacology.

Medicinal Chemistry may also refer to:

- Clinical chemistry, area of chemistry also known as medical biochemistry
- Medicinal Chemistry (Bentham Open journal), published by Bentham Open
- Medicinal Chemistry (OMICS Publishing Group journal), published by OMICS Publishing Group
