= Current Gene Therapy =

- Discipline: Gene therapy
- Language: English
- Edited by: Liang Cheng

Publication details
- History: 2001-present
- Publisher: Bentham Science Publishers
- Frequency: 5 issues/year
- Impact factor: 4.676 (2022)

Standard abbreviations
- ISO 4: Curr. Gene Ther.

Indexing
- CODEN: CGTUAH
- ISSN: 1566-5232 (print); 1875-5631 (web)
- OCLC no.: 48623855

Links
- Journal homepage; Online access; Online archive

Current Gene Therapy is a peer-reviewed medical journal published by Bentham Science Publishers. The editor-in-chief is Liang Cheng (Harbin Medical University Harbin, China). The focus of this journal is pre-clinical or clinical research on gene therapy. Formats of publication include original research reports, review papers, and rapid communications ("letters").

== Content ==
Current Gene Therapy is a peer-reviewed journal published bi-monthly by Bentham Science. The journal content is aimed at academic and industrial scientists with a technical focus on gene and cell therapy, preclinical and clinical research. The journal publishes articles concerning basic research and clinical applications of gene and cell therapy of diseases including new scientific methods, gene delivery systems, gene therapy treatments, as well as approaches to genetic modification with the aim of treating disease. A more recent focus of the journal includes Cell Therapy, with genetic modification, in essence ex vivo gene therapy. Previous issues have focused on the latest developments in gene transfer, gene expression and regulation, development of novel gene delivery vectors, and ex vivo gene therapies, animal models, and human therapeutic applications.

The journal publishes both full-length and mini-reviews, original research, meta-analysis, and results from clinical studies. In addition, the journal has published manuscripts focused on ethical and regulatory considerations of gene and cell therapy. As well as important regulatory, manufacturing, and logistical aspects of gene therapy research. The journal's review articles are aimed at providing background on "late breaking discoveries on which substantial literature has not yet been amassed".

== History ==
The journal's first issue was published in 2001, making Current Gene Therapy one of the oldest peer-reviewed journals with a specific focus on Gene Therapy. The original issue focused on viral vectors for gene delivery vectors and use of gene therapy treatments for oncology. Current Gene Therapy was among the first gene therapy focused journals to publish on the use of Alphaviruses for gene therapy, oncolytic virotherapy using adenoviral-mediated gene transfer, and the use of Fas Ligand, TRAIL, and Bax for the treatment of prostate cancer.

== Abstracting and indexing ==
The journal is indexed in several citation and bibliographic databases with a focus on life sciences, biomedical research, and medicine:

- Chemical Abstracts
- MEDLINE/Index Medicus/PubMed
- Biotechnology Citation Index
- BIOSIS
- BIOSIS Previews
- BIOSIS Reviews Reports and Meetings
- British Library
- Science Citation Index Expanded
- Scopus
- EMBASE
- Elsevier BIOBASE
- ChemWeb
- CNKI Scholar

According to Bioxbio the Academic Accelerator, the 2022-2023 journal impact factor is 4.676 and the real-time impact factor is 5.7.
