= Anti-Cancer Agents in Medicinal Chemistry =

- Discipline: Medicinal chemistry
- Language: English
- Edited by: Dr. Simone Carradori

Publication details
- Former name: Current Medicinal Chemistry – Anti-Cancer Agents
- History: 2001–present
- Publisher: Bentham Science Publishers
- Frequency: 18/year
- Impact factor: 2.505 (2020)

Standard abbreviations
- ISO 4: Anti-Cancer Agents Med. Chem.

Indexing
- CODEN: AAMCE4
- ISSN: 1871-5206 (print); 1875-5992 (web)
- OCLC no.: 63110311
- Current Medicinal Chemistry – Anti-Cancer Agents
- ISSN: 1568-0118

Links
- Journal homepage; Online access; Online archive

Anti-Cancer Agents in Medicinal Chemistry is a peer-reviewed academic journal covering the disciplines of medicinal chemistry and drug design relating to chemotherapeutic agents in cancer. It is published by Bentham Science Publishers and the editor-in-chief is Simone Carradori ("G. d'Annunzio" University of Chieti-Pescara). The journal covers developments in "medicinal chemistry and rational drug design for the discovery of anti-cancer agents" and publishes original research reports and review papers.

It is related to the journal Current Medicinal Chemistry and was established in 2001 as Current Medicinal Chemistry – Anti-Cancer Agents. The journal obtained its present title in 2006.

== Abstracting and indexing ==
The journal is abstracted and indexed in:

- BIOSIS Previews
- Chemical Abstracts Service
- Embase
- Index Medicus/MEDLINE/PubMed
- ProQuest databases
- Science Citation Index Expanded
- Scopus

According to the Journal Citation Reports, the journal has a 2022 impact factor of 2.8.
