= Serpentine soil =

Soil type

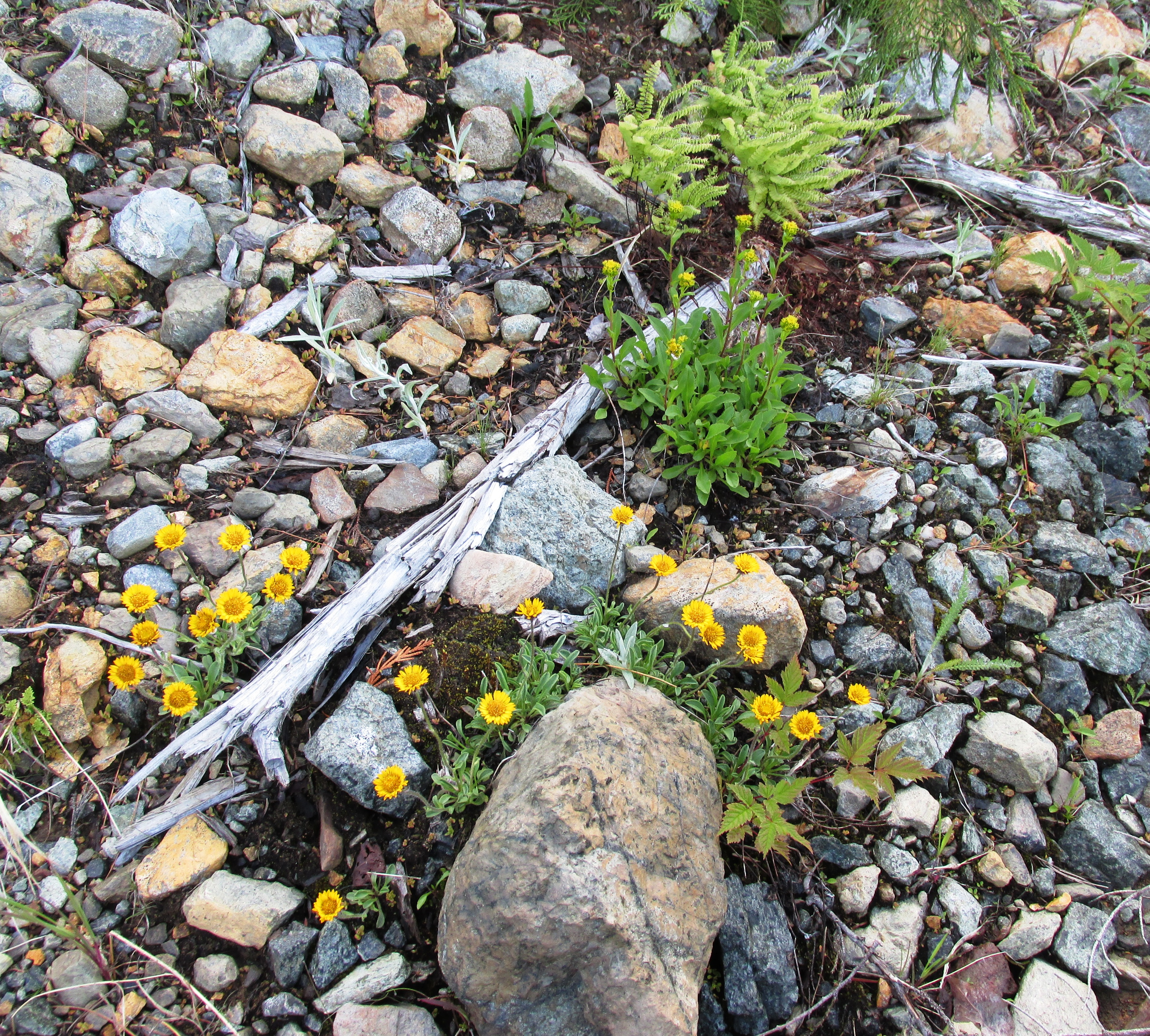
Solidago multiradiata, Erigeron aureus, and Adiantum aleuticum in rocky serpentine soil

Serpentine soil is an uncommon soil type produced by weathered ultramafic rock such as peridotite and its metamorphic derivatives such as serpentinite. More precisely, serpentine soil contains minerals of the serpentine subgroup, especially antigorite, lizardite, and chrysotile or white asbestos, all of which are commonly found in ultramafic rocks. The term "serpentine" is commonly used to refer to both the soil type and the mineral group which forms its parent materials.

Serpentine soils exhibit distinct chemical and physical properties and are generally regarded as poor soils for agriculture. The soil is often reddish, brown, or gray in color due to its high iron and low organic content. Geologically, areas with serpentine bedrock are characteristically steep, rocky, and vulnerable to erosion, which causes many serpentine soils to be rather shallow. The shallow soils and sparse vegetation lead to elevated soil temperatures and dry conditions. Due to their ultramafic origin, serpentine soils also have a low calcium-to-magnesium ratio and have low levels of many essential nutrients such as nitrogen (N), phosphorus (P), and potassium (K). Serpentine soils contain high concentrations of heavy metals, including chromium, iron, cobalt, and nickel. Together, these factors create serious ecological challenges for plants living in serpentine soils.

== Parent rock ==
Serpentinite is a meta-igneous rock formed by the metamorphic reaction of olivine-rich rock, peridotite, with water. Serpentinite has a mottled, greenish-gray, or bluish-gray color and is often waxy to the touch. The rock often contains white streaks of chrysotile running through it, which are a type of naturally occurring asbestos. Asbestos is linked to an array of human health conditions such as mesothelioma from long-time exposure of breathing in the dust particles. Caution should be taken when working in serpentine soils or when working with crushed serpentine rocks.

Serpentinite most often forms in oceanic crust near the surface of the earth, particularly where water circulates in cooling rock near mid-ocean ridges: masses of the resulting ultramafic rock are found in ophiolites incorporated in continental crust near present and past tectonic plate boundaries.

Serpentine soils are derived from ultramafic rocks. Ultramafic rocks are igneous or metamorphic rocks that contain more than 70% iron or magnesium minerals.

== Distribution ==
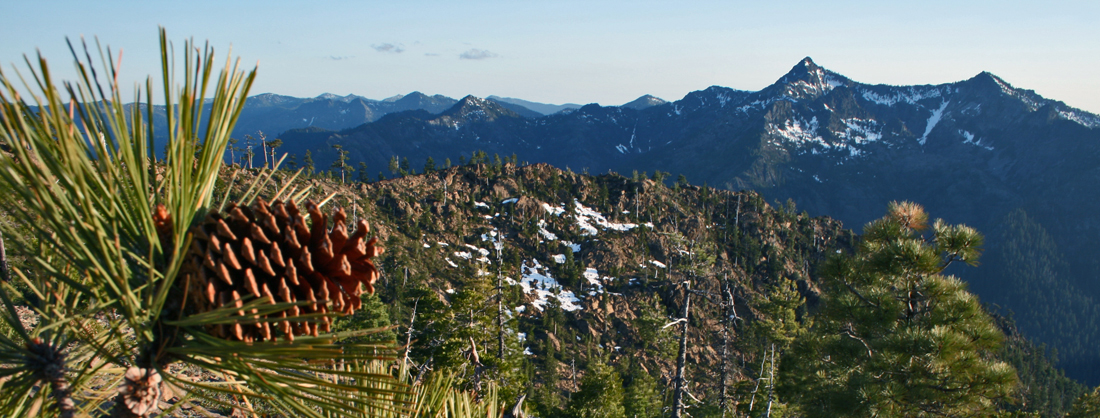
Serpentine outcrop high in the Siskiyou Wilderness of northwest California—here Jeffrey pine dominates the landscape.

Serpentine soils are widely distributed on Earth, in part mirroring the distribution of ophiolites. There are outcroppings of serpentine soils in the Balkan Peninsula, Turkey, Newfoundland, the island of Cyprus, the Alps, Cuba, and New Caledonia. In North America, the majority of the serpentine soils are in California; however, serpentine is also present in small but widely distributed areas on the eastern slope of the Appalachian Mountains in the eastern United States.

== Botany ==
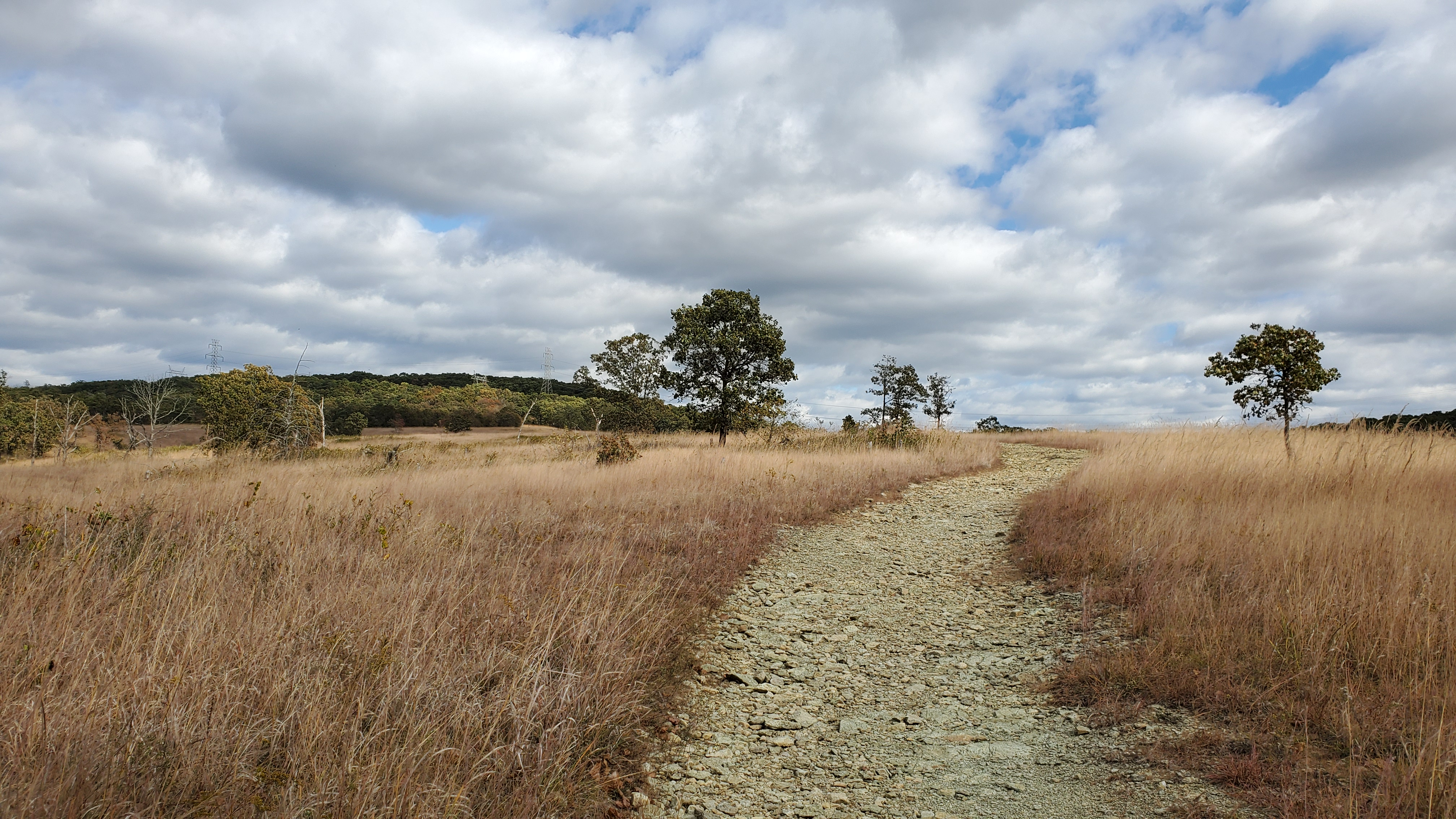
Soldiers Delight Natural Environment Area in Maryland

Ecologically, serpentine soils have three main traits: poor plant productivity, high rates of endemism, and vegetation types that are distinct from neighboring areas.

Serpentine plant communities range from moist bogs and fens to rocky barrens and must be able to tolerate the harsh environmental conditions of such poor soil. As a result, they are often drastically different from non-serpentine soil areas bordering the serpentine soils. Vegetative characteristics are often shared among the types of flora found on serpentine soils. They will exhibit a "stunted" growth habit, with dull waxy, gray-green leaves (seen in Eriogonum libertini), which allow for water retention and sunlight reflection respectively. Other possible phenotypic traits include pigmented stems (as seen in the Streptanthus howellii) and occasionally a carnivorous nature as seen in the Darlingtonia californica. Some examples of common serpentine tolerant plants include gray pine (Pinus sabiniana), Jeffrey Pine (Pinus jeffreyi), California lilac (Ceanothus sp.), manzanita (Arctostaphylos sp.), live oak (Quercus sp.), California redbud (Cercis occidentalis), California buckeye (Aesculus californica), California laurel (bay tree) (Umbellularia californica), and the ferns Aspidotis densa and Polystichum lemmonii.

Areas of serpentine soil are also home to diverse plants, many of which are rare or endangered species such as Acanthomintha duttonii, Pentachaeta bellidiflora, and Phlox hirsuta. In California, 45% of the taxa associated with serpentine are rare or endangered. In California, shrubs such as leather oak (Quercus durata) and coast whiteleaf manzanita (Arctostaphylos viscida ssp. pulchella) are typical of serpentine soils.

In order to overcome the chemical and physical challenges presented by serpentine soils, plants have developed tolerances to drought, heavy metals, and limited nutrients. Low calcium:magnesium ratios cause limited root growth and root activity, weak cell membranes, and reduced uptake of essential nutrients. An adaptive mechanism to high magnesium soils allocates more resources to deep-growing roots. Heavy metals stunt growth, induce iron deficiency, cause chlorosis, and restrict root development. Multiple adaptive mechanisms to heavy metals include the exclusion of metals by restricting the uptake by the roots, compartmentalization of metals in various organs, or the development of toxicity tolerance. In nitrogen-poor sites, physiological effects on plants include impaired protein synthesis, chlorosis, reduced leaf turgor, reduced leaf and tiller number, reduced growth rate, and low seed yield. Low phosphorus levels cause similar effects of low nitrogen but also cause reduced seed size, lower root to shoot ratios, and increased water stress. Low soil moisture causes reduced nutrient uptake and transport, decreased stomatal opening, and reduced photosynthetic capacity, and also reduces plant growth and productivity. Serpentine plants have strongly developed root systems to facilitate uptake of water and nutrients. For example, Noccaea fendleri (aka Fendler's penny grass) is a hyper-accumulator of nickel and Sedum laxum expresses succulence. In some cases, symbioses with serpentine tolerant ectomycorrhizal help facilitate plants' adaptation to edaphic stressors on serpentine.

Adaptation to serpentine soils has evolved multiple times. Serpentine-tolerant plants are evolutionarily younger than non-serpentine plants. The heterogeneity of serpentine communities coupled with their patchy distribution limits gene flow but promotes speciation and diversification. Habitat heterogeneity is an important contributor to the level of endemism and biodiversity in this system. Although the patchy distribution is attributed to the high rates of speciation in serpentine communities, there are a number of challenges associated with this. The spatial isolation from source and other populations limit gene flow, which could make these populations vulnerable to changing environmental conditions. In addition, there is high gene flow with the non-serpentine communities that can cause genotypic pollution, hybridization, and nonviable offspring.

== Bioremediation ==
The unique plants that survive in serpentine soils have been used in the process of phytoremediation, a type of bioremediation. Since these plants developed specialized adaptations to high concentrations of heavy metals, they have been used to remove heavy metals from polluted soil.

== Serpentine barrens ==
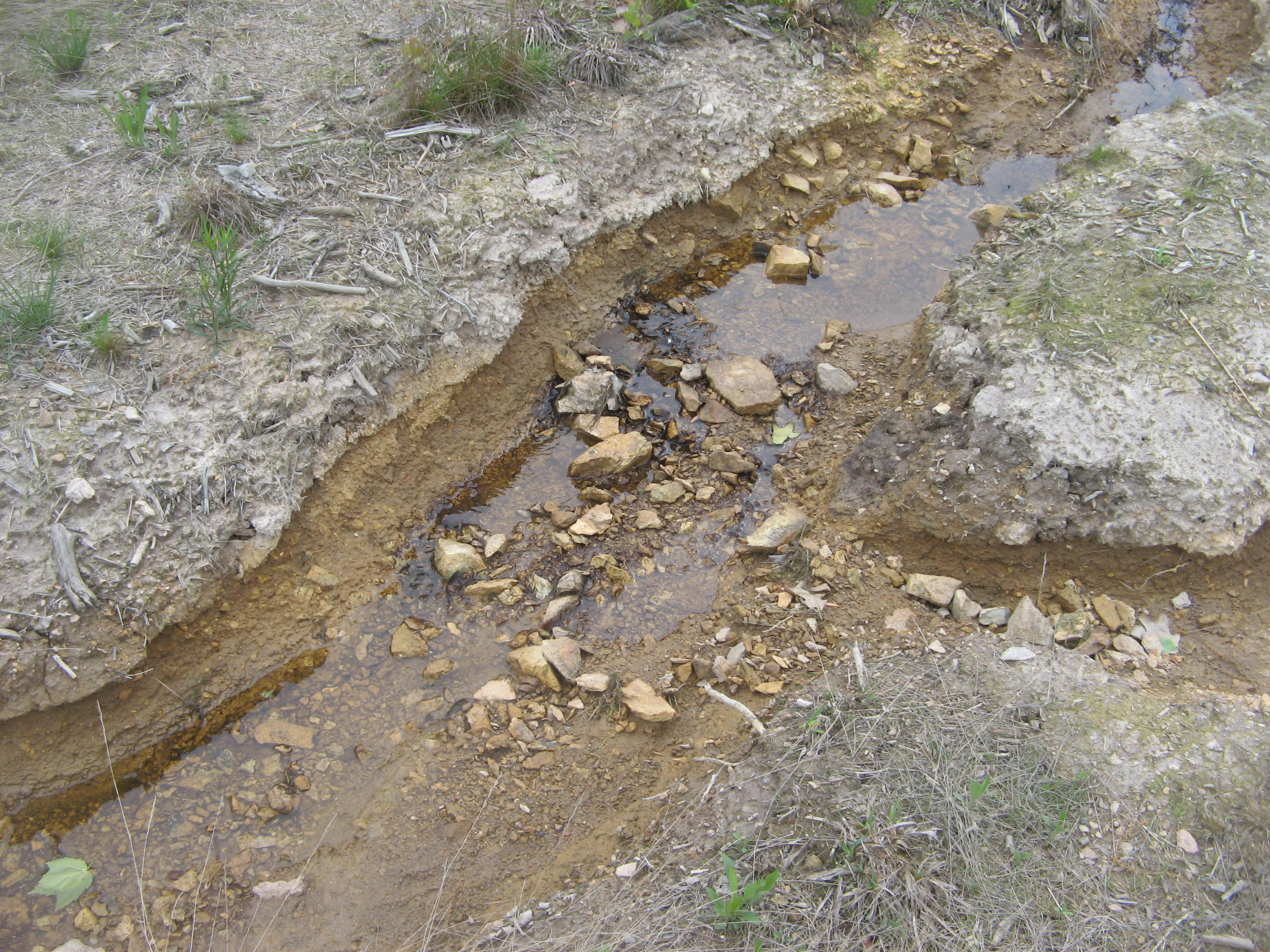
Unlike most ecosystems, in serpentine barrens, there is less plant growth closer to a stream, due to toxic minerals in the water.

Serpentine barrens are a unique ecoregion found in parts of the United States in small but widely distributed areas of the Appalachian Mountains and the Coast Ranges of California, Oregon, and Washington. Barrens are especially likely in ultramafic areas which never had substantial deposits of non-ultramafic, more nutrient-rich material as carried by water (including glaciers) or wind (which delivers loess, sand or volcanic ash). In California, 10% of the state's plants are serpentine endemics. The barrens occur on outcrops of altered ultramafic ophiolites.

They are named for minerals of the serpentine group, resulting in serpentine soils, with unusually high concentrations of iron, chromium, nickel, and cobalt. Serpentine barrens, as at Grass Valley, California, often consist of grassland or savannas in areas where the climate would normally lead to the growth of forests.

Serpentine soils can be amended to support crops and pasture land for cattle grazing. This can be done by adding soluble calcium carriers such as gypsum to the soil. By adding gypsum or other calcium compounds a more favourable calcium-to-magnesium ratio can be developed, creating a better balance of plant nutrients. This, however, poses a possible implication to grazing cattle. An article from the Journal of Trace Elements in Medicine and Biology discerned that 20% of the grazing animals had toxic levels of nickel in their kidneys, and 32% had toxic levels of copper in their liver. Further study is needed to see if this will potentially have a negative effect on human health as it pertains to beef consumption.

=== Examples ===
Soldiers Delight Natural Environment Area in Baltimore County, Maryland, covers 1,900 acres of serpentine barren. The area has over 38 rare, threatened, and endangered plant species; as well as rare insects, rocks, and minerals.

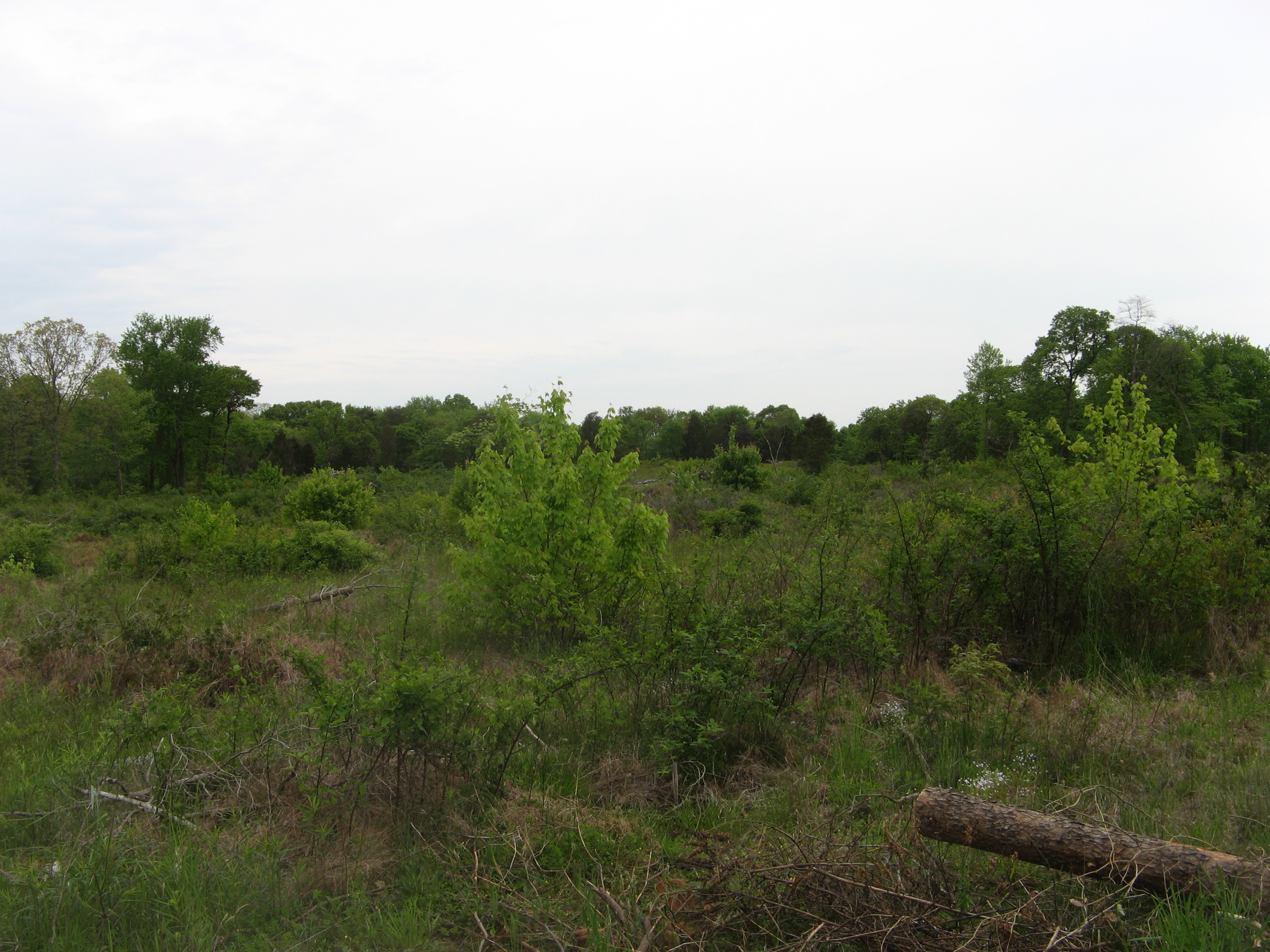
Serpentine Barrens in Rock Springs Nature Preserve, Lancaster County, Pennsylvania

Rock Springs Nature Preserve in Lancaster County, Pennsylvania is a 176-acre (71 ha) property conserved by the Lancaster County Conservancy that is a prime example of a serpentine barren. It was originally a grassland, but wildfire suppression led to the conversion of the area to forest. This barren contains the rare serpentine aster (Symphyotrichum depauperatum), as well as a number of rare species of moths and skippers.

In Chester County, Pennsylvania, the Nottingham Park, aka Serpentine Barrens, was recommended by UMCES as deserving of National Natural Landmark designation on numerous grounds including habitat for rare and endemic species, an intact population of pitch pine, and historic significance. Since 1979, the Nature Conservancy has worked with the local community to protect and preserve several tracts in the State-Line Serpentine Barrens which are home to this fragile habitat.

Buck Creek Serpentine Barrens in Nantahala National Forest in Clay County, North Carolina, is another example. Dominant rock types are serpentinized dunite and olivine, with variable soil depths ranging from 0 to 60 centimetres (0 to 24 inches) and rock outcrops representing 5–10% of the local landscape. The U.S. National Vegetation Classification for this community is "Southern Blue Ridge Ultramafic Outcrop Barren" and believed to be unique to the Buck Creek area. In 1995, the United States Forest Service began active conservation management of the site, primarily with prescribed controlled burns, which, along with some manual cover removal, has been successful in regenerating populations of previously sparse species. In addition to over 20 conservationally listed plant species, Rhiannon's aster (Symphyotrichum rhiannon) was described in 2004 and is endemic to these barrens.

== See also ==
- Dwarf forest
