= Sheldon Krimsky =

American academic (1942–2022)

- Born: June 26, 1941; Brooklyn, New York, U.S.
- Died: April 23, 2022 (aged 80); Cambridge, Massachusetts, U.S.
- Education: Purdue University, Brooklyn College and Boston University
- Alma mater: Brooklyn College; Purdue University; Boston University
- Scientific career
- Fields: Urban and Environmental Policy and Planning
- Institutions: Tufts University
- Website: Sheldon Krimsky, Tufts University

Sheldon Krimsky (June 26, 1941 – April 23, 2022) was a professor of Urban and Environmental Policy and Planning at Tufts University, and adjunct professor in the Department of Family Medicine and Community Health at Tufts University School of Medicine. He was a fellow of the Hastings Center, an independent bioethics research institution.

Krimsky received his bachelor's and master's degrees in physics from Brooklyn College and Purdue University respectively, and a masters and doctorate in philosophy at Boston University.

== Work ==
=== Science in the Private Interest ===
In his 2003 book Science in the Private Interest, Krimsky argued that conflicts of interests are perceived and regulated very differently in public affairs and in science:

The prophylactic measures that are taken to prevent conflict of interest in public affairs are considered irrelevant in science precisely because scientists view themselves as participating in a higher calling than that of public officials—namely, the pursuit of objective knowledge. While senior public officials (elected or appointed) are prohibited from managing their portfolios during their tenure in office, scientists with patents and equity in companies that fund their research are at most simply asked to disclose their interests.

Krimsky raised the concern that conflicts of interest may compromise the scientific norm of "disinterestedness", which "requires that scientists apply the methods, perform the analysis, and execute the interpretation of results without considerations of personal gain, ideology, or fidelity to any cause other than the pursuit of truth." He claimed that blurred boundaries between public interest science and pursuit of private gain have severely compromised the integrity of university science:

The evolving academic universe is no longer as nurturing an environment for public-interest science as it once was. To a large degree, universities have been taken over by money managers and academic entrepreneurs who are looking for financially lucrative research.

Krimsky argued that the profit motive has corrupted many scientists in biomedical research. He also proposed that the relationships between corporations, universities, and government agencies have resulted in biased science that puts human health and environment at risk. He had written and commented on genetically modified foods, water fluoridation, environmental health, global warming, and other controversial topics.

== Editorial and advisory positions ==
- Accountability in Research - Associate Editor
- Science, Technology, & Human Values - Editorial Advisory Board Member
- Journal of BioLaw and Business - Life Sciences Advisory Board Member
- Human Gene Therapy - former Advisory Board Member
- New Genetics and Society - International Editorial Board Member
- Expert Opinion on Pharmacotherapy - Editorial Board Member
- Council for Responsible Genetics (publishing GeneWatch) - chair, Board of Directors
- International Journal of Environmental Technology & Management - Editorial Board Member
- Public Library of Science - Member, Medicine Advisory Group on Competing Interests and Publication Ethics
- National Institutes of Health - former member (1978–1981), Recombinant DNA Advisory Committee
- President's Commission for the Study of Ethical Problems in Medicine and Biomedical and Behavioral Research - former consultant
- Congressional Office of Technology Assessment - former consultant
- American Association for the Advancement of Science - former chair (1988–1992), Committee on Scientific Freedom and Responsibility
- Hastings Center on Bioethics - fellow
- American Association of University Professors - member, Committee A
- American Civil Liberties Union - member of a study panel that formulated a policy on civil liberties and scientific research

== Publications ==
=== Books ===
- Sheldon Krimsky. "Conflicts of Interest In Science: How Corporate-Funded Academic Research Can Threaten Public Health". (Hot Books, February 12, 2019) 400pp. ISBN 1510736522.
- Sheldon Krimsky. Stem Cell Dialogues: A Philosophical and Scientific Inquiry Into Medical Frontiers. (Columbia University Press, June 23, 2015) 280pp. ISBN 0231167482.
- Krimsky, Sheldon (2003). Science in the Private Interest: Has the Lure of Profits Corrupted Biomedical Research?. Rowman & Littlefield. p. 272. ISBN 978-0-7425-4371-3.
- Sheldon Krimsky. Hormonal Chaos: The Scientific and Social Origins of the Environmental Endocrine Hypothesis (Johns Hopkins University Press, 2000) 252pp. ISBN 0801872529
- Sheldon Krimsky. Biotechnics and Society: The Rise of Industrial Genetics (Praeger, 1991), ISBN 0275938603
- Sheldon Krimsky. Genetic Alchemy: The Social History of the Recombinant DNA Controversy. (MIT Press, 1982)

=== Co-authored books ===
- Sheldon Krimsky and Marion Nestle. "GMOs Decoded: A Skeptic's View of Genetically Modified Foods (Food, Health, and the Environment)". (MIT Press, March 12, 2019) 216pp. ISBN 0262039192.
- Agricultural Biotechnology and the Environment: Science, Policy and Social Values (University of Illinois, 1996)
- Environmental Hazards: Communicating Risks as a Social Process (Auburn House, 1988)
- Krimsky, Sheldon; Simoncelli, Tania (2010). Genetic Justice: DNA Data Banks, Criminal Investigations, and Civil Liberties. Columbia University Press. ISBN 9780231145206.

=== Co-edited books ===
- Sheldon Krimsky and Jeremy Gruber (Editors). "The GMO Deception: What You Need to Know about the Food, Corporations, and Government Agencies Putting Our Families and Our Environment at Risk". (Skyhorse, April 12, 2016) 440pp. ISBN 1510702660.
- Rights and Liberties in the Biotech Age: Why We Need a Genetic Bill of Rights (Rowman & Littlefield Publishers, 2005)
- Social Theories of Risk (Praeger, 1992)

== See also ==
- Mark Diesendorf
