= Rochkind =

Rochkind is a surname. Notable people with the surname include:

- Marc Rochkind, American computer scientist
- Shimon Rochkind, Israeli clinician and neurosurgeon
