= SSMU =

SSMU may refer to:

- Samarkand State Medical University, Uzbekistan
- Saratov State Medical University, Russia
- Shanghai Jiao Tong University School of Medicine, formerly Shanghai Second Medical University, China
- Siberian State Medical University, Russia
- Sony's Spider-Man Universe, a media franchise
- Students' Society of McGill University, Canada
