= Combinatorial Chemistry & High Throughput Screening =

- Discipline: Combinatorial chemistry
- Language: English
- Edited by: Rathnam Chaguturu

Publication details
- History: 1998-present
- Publisher: Bentham Science Publishers
- Frequency: 10/year
- Impact factor: 1.205 (2017)

Standard abbreviations
- ISO 4: Comb. Chem. High Throughput Screen.

Indexing
- CODEN: CCHSFU
- ISSN: 1386-2073 (print); 1875-5402 (web)
- LCCN: sn98039363
- OCLC no.: 60638049

Links
- Journal homepage; Online access at IngentaConnect

Combinatorial Chemistry & High Throughput Screening is a peer-reviewed scientific journal that covers combinatorial chemistry. It was established in 1998 and is published by Bentham Science Publishers. The editor-in-chief is Gerald H. Lushington (LiS Consulting, Lawrence, KS, USA). The journal has 5 sections: Combinatorial/ Medicinal Chemistry, Chemo/Bio Informatics, High Throughput Screening, Pharmacognosy, and Laboratory Automation.

== Abstracting and indexing ==
The journal is abstracted and indexed in:

- Chemical Abstracts
- Current Contents/Life Sciences
- EMBASE/Excerpta Medica
- MEDLINE/Index Medicus
- Science Citation Index Expanded
- Elsevier BIOBASE
- CAB Abstracts
- Chemistry Citation Index
- Current Chemical Reactions
- Biological Abstracts
- BIOSIS Previews
- Scopus
- EMBiology

According to the Journal Citation Reports, the journal has a 2014 impact factor of 1.222, ranking it 40th out of 70 journals in the category "Chemistry, Applied".
