= The Open Ecology Journal =

- Discipline: Ecology
- Language: English

Publication details
- History: 2008-present
- Publisher: Bentham Open
- Open access: Yes
- License: Creative Commons Attribution non-commercial License

Standard abbreviations
- ISO 4: Open Ecol. J.

Indexing
- CODEN: OEJPF7
- ISSN: 1874-2130
- OCLC no.: 317717553

Links
- Journal homepage

The Open Ecology Journal is an open-access peer-reviewed scientific journal covering ecology. It publishes original research articles and reviews.

== Abstracting and indexing ==
The journal is indexed in:

- Chemical Abstracts
- EMBASE
- Scopus
