= Current Cancer Drug Targets =

- Discipline: Oncology
- Language: English
- Edited by: Ruiwen Zhang

Publication details
- History: 2001–present
- Publisher: Bentham Science Publishers
- Frequency: 11/year
- Impact factor: 2.912 (2019)

Standard abbreviations
- ISO 4: Curr. Cancer Drug Targets

Indexing
- CODEN: CCDTB9
- ISSN: 1568-0096 (print); 1873-5576 (web)
- OCLC no.: 48132748

Links
- Journal homepage; Online access; Online archive

Current Cancer Drug Targets is a peer-reviewed medical journal published by Bentham Science Publishers. The editor-in-chief is Ruiwen Zhang (UH Drug Discovery Institute). The journal covers research on contemporary molecular drug targets involved in cancer, including medicinal chemistry, pharmacology, molecular biology, genomics, and biochemistry. Current Cancer Drug Targets publishes original research reports, review papers, and rapid communications ("letters").

== Abstracting and indexing ==
Current Cancer Drug Targets is abstracted and indexed in:

- Chemical Abstracts Service/CASSI
- EMBASE
- EMBiology
- MEDLINE
- Science Citation Index Expanded
- Scopus

According to the Journal Citation Reports, the journal has a 2019 impact factor of 2.912.
