= Tania Simoncelli =

American scientist

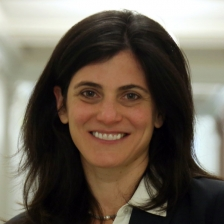
- Simoncelli in 2014
- Education: Cornell University (BA); University of California, Berkeley (MS)
- Employers: Broad Institute; Office of Science and Technology Policy; Food and Drug Administration; American Civil Liberties Union; Chan Zuckerberg Initiative

Tania Simoncelli is an American scientist who is the Senior Advisor to the Director of the Broad Institute of MIT and Harvard. Prior to that position, she worked for two years as Assistant Director for Forensic Science and Biomedical Innovation within the Office of Science and Technology Policy. Simoncelli became the Vice President of Translational Impact and engagement in Biohub taking charge of projects such as the Rare As One Project. From 2010 to 2013, she worked in the Food and Drug Administration's Office of the Commissioner. From 2003 to 2010, Simoncelli worked as the Science Advisor to the American Civil Liberties Union (ACLU), where she advised the organization on emerging developments in science and technology that pose challenges for civil liberties.

In December 2013, Simoncelli was named by the journal Nature as one of "ten people who mattered this year" for her work in spearheading the development of the ACLU's successful legal challenge to the patenting of human genes. In August 2017, she was named Director of Policy for Science at the Chan Zuckerberg Initiative.

Simoncelli has spoken, written, and advised on a number of contemporary science policy issues, including personalized medicine, gene patenting, forensic DNA data banks, pesticide testing in humans, and academic freedom. She is co-author with Sheldon Krimsky of Genetic Justice: DNA Data Banks, Criminal Investigations, and Civil Liberties.

== Education ==
Simoncelli received her BA in Biology and Science from Cornell University in 1993. She also received her MS degree from University of California, Berkeley's Energy and Resources Group.

== Gene patents ==
From 1982 to 2013, the US Patent and Trademark Office (USPTO) accepted patents on isolated DNA sequences as a composition of matter. Simoncelli has stated that this became a "significant barrier to biomedical discovery and innovation." From 2005 to 2009, Simoncelli, as the American Civil Liberties Union's science advisor, worked with ACLU lawyer Chris Hansen to file a case against Salt Lake City-based Myriad Genetics. Myriad Genetics held a complete monopoly on BRCA testing in the United States as Myriad had held the patents on the gene associated with increased risk for breast cancer, the (BRCA1) gene, since 1995 and on the BRCA2 gene since 1998. The company charged $3000 a test and, in Simoncelli's words, "refused to update its test to include additional mutations that had been identified by a team of researchers in France". The lead plaintiff of 20 plaintiffs represented by Hansen in the ACLU-sponsored lawsuit was the Association for Molecular Pathology (AMP). In March 2010, the Southern District Court of New York Judge Robert Sweet ruled in favor of the AMP that all the challenged claims were not patent-eligible. Myriad appealed this decision, and the case went before the United States Court of Appeals for the Federal Circuit, which, although affirming part of the district court's ruling, also partly overturned it, ruling instead that isolated DNA sequences are patent-eligible. Ultimately, the case went before the Supreme Court, which, in a unanimous decision on June 13, 2013, invalidated Myriad's claims to isolated genes in Association for Molecular Pathology v. Myriad Genetics, ruling that merely isolating genes that are found in nature does not make them patentable.
