= The AAPS Journal =

- Discipline: Pharmaceutical sciences
- Language: English
- Edited by: Ho-Leung Fung

Publication details
- History: 1999–present
- Publisher: Springer Science+Business Media on behalf of the American Association of Pharmaceutical Scientists
- Frequency: Bimonthly
- Open access: Hybrid
- Impact factor: 3.603 (2021)

Standard abbreviations
- ISO 4: AAPS J.

Indexing
- CODEN: AJAOB6
- ISSN: 1550-7416
- LCCN: 2004212722
- OCLC no.: 55603053

Links
- Journal homepage; Journal page at society website; Online archive

The AAPS Journal is a bimonthly peer-reviewed scientific journal covering all aspects of pharmaceutical sciences. It is published by Springer Science+Business Media on behalf of the American Association of Pharmaceutical Scientists. The editor-in-chief is Ho-Leung Fung (State University of New York at Buffalo).

== Abstracting and indexing ==
The journal is abstracted and indexed in:

- BIOSIS Previews
- Chemical Abstracts Service
- CSA databases
- Embase
- Index Medicus/MEDLINE/PubMed
- Proquest databases
- Science Citation Index Expanded
- Scopus

According to the Journal Citation Reports, the journal has a 2021 impact factor of 3.603.

== See also ==
- List of pharmaceutical sciences journals
