= China Pharmacy =

- Discipline: Pharmacy
- Language: Chinese

Publication details
- History: 1990-present
- Frequency: 48/year

Standard abbreviations
- ISO 4: China Pharm.

Indexing
- CODEN: ZYHAA4
- ISSN: 1001-0408
- OCLC no.: 62978876

Links
- Journal homepage

China Pharmacy (Chinese: 中国药房 - Zhongguo Yaofang) is a weekly peer-reviewed medical journal on pharmacy and related medical subjects published in Chinese. It is supervised by the Ministry of Public Health of the People's Republic of China and operated by the China Hospital Association and China Pharmacy Publishing House. It was established in 1990 with Majin as its founding editor-in-chief.

== Reception ==
The journal is a National Chinese Core Journal, Scien-tech Periodical for Statistics in China, Chinese Periodical Maxtrix Double Effects Perioical, and the winner of the Third Assembly China National Periodical Prize.

It is indexed in the Tsinghua Tongfang Database, Chinese Science Citation Database, Chinese Journal Full-text Database, Chinese Medical Current Contents, Chinese Medical Citation Index, China Academic Journal Comprehensive Assessment Database, and Chemical Abstracts.
