= Current Drug Metabolism =

- Discipline: Pharmacology
- Language: English
- Edited by: Ming Hu

Publication details
- History: 2000-present
- Publisher: Bentham Science Publishers
- Frequency: 10/year
- Impact factor: 2.960 (2019)

Standard abbreviations
- ISO 4: Curr. Drug Metab.

Indexing
- CODEN: CDMUBU
- ISSN: 1389-2002 (print); 1875-5453 (web)
- OCLC no.: 55201006

Links
- Journal homepage

Current Drug Metabolism is a peer-reviewed medical journal covering the study of drug metabolism. It was established in 2000 and is published 10 times per year by Bentham Science Publishers. The editor-in-chief is Ming Hu (University of Houston). According to the Journal Citation Reports, the journal has a 2019 impact factor of 2.960.

== Abstracted and indexed in ==
This journal has been indexed in:

- Science Citation Index-Expanded (SciSearch)
- Journal Citation Reports/Science Edition
- Index to Scientific Reviews®
- Biochemistry & Biophysics Citation IndexTM
- Current Contents® - Life Sciences BIOSIS
- BIOSIS Previews
- BIOSIS Reviews Reports and Meetings
- MEDLINE/PubMed/Index Medicus
- Scopus
- EMBASE/Excerpta Medica
- Chemical Abstracts Service/SciFinder
- ProQuest
- ChemWeb
- Google Scholar
- PubsHub
- MediaFinder®-Standard Periodical Directory
- Genamics JournalSeek
- J-Gate
- CNKI Scholar
- Suweco CZ
- TOC Premier
- EBSCO
- British Library and Ulrich's Periodicals Directory
