= Jasur Rizayev =

Uzbek physician and university rector

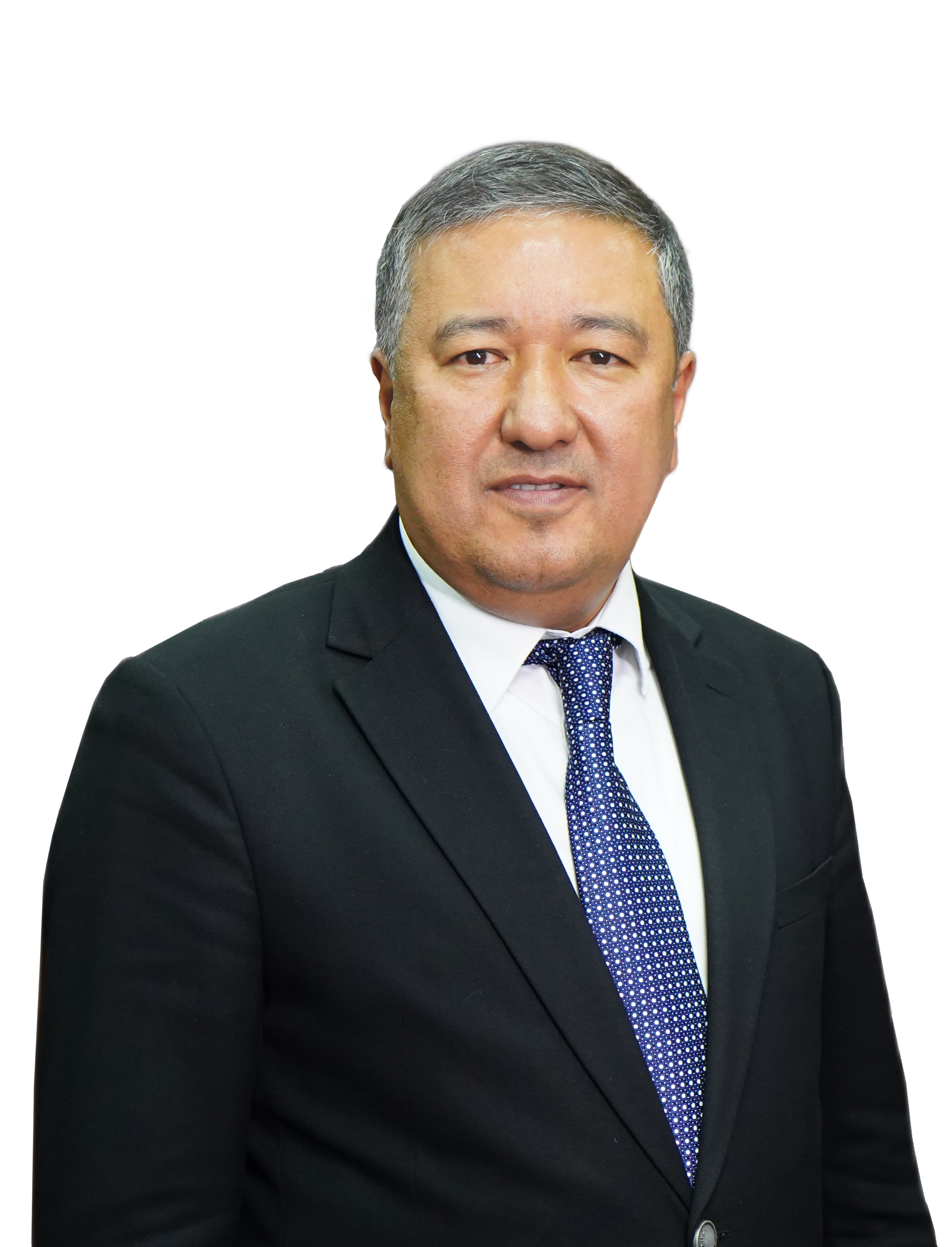
- Born: 27 June 1974 (age 52); Tashkent, Uzbek SSR, Soviet Union
- Citizenship: Uzbekistan
- Alma mater: First Tashkent Medical Institute
- Occupation: University rector
- Organization: Samarkand State Medical University
- Title: Rector of Samarkand State Medical University
- Website: https://www.sammu.uz/ru/pages/rector

Jasur Alimjanovich Rizayev (born 27 June 1974) is an Uzbek dentist, Doctor of Medical Sciences, professor, and rector of Samarkand State Medical University.

== Biography ==
Rizayev was born on 27 June 1974 in Tashkent.

In 1991, he graduated with a gold medal from Secondary School No. 254 in the Shaykhantahur district of Tashkent.

In 1996, he graduated from the First Tashkent Medical Institute. He subsequently worked as a medical intern at the institute's outpatient clinic and department of prosthodontics.

From 1998 to 2000, he worked as a senior laboratory assistant in the department of therapeutic dentistry, and from 2000 to 2007 as an assistant. From 2005 to 2007, he chaired the student trade union at Tashkent Medical Academy.

In 2006, he defended a candidate dissertation on the clinical and functional characteristics of periodontitis and its treatment. He also worked as an associate professor in the department of therapeutic dentistry.

In 2007, he was appointed deputy chief physician of the third clinic of Tashkent Medical Academy. He subsequently headed the Uchtepa district medical association in Tashkent. In 2011, he was appointed chief physician of the academy's third clinic.

In 2015, he defended a doctoral dissertation on developing a concept and programme for preventing periodontal diseases in Uzbekistan through social and hygienic research.

From 26 August 2016 to 2020, he served as rector of Tashkent State Dental Institute.

In February 2020, he was appointed rector of Samarkand State Medical Institute, now Samarkand State Medical University.

He is married and has two children.

== Honorary appointments ==
- Honorary professor of Bukhara State Medical Institute, Uzbekistan (2019).
- Honorary professor of North-Western State Medical University named after I. I. Mechnikov, Russia (2021).
- Honorary professor of Asfendiyarov Kazakh National Medical University, Kazakhstan (2021).
- Honorary professor of the Moscow Regional Research and Clinical Institute named after M. F. Vladimirsky, Russia (2023).
- Honorary Academician of Izhevsk State Medical Academy, Russia (2023).
- Honorary professor of Voronezh State Medical University named after N. N. Burdenko, Russia (2024).
- Honorary doctor of Belarusian State Medical University, Belarus (2024).
- Honorary professor of Xinjiang Medical University, China (2024).
- Honorary professor of Perm State Medical University named after Academician E. A. Wagner, Russia (2024).
- Honorary professor of Kabardino-Balkarian State University named after H. M. Berbekov, Russia (2025).
- Honorary professor of the University of Health Sciences (Sağlık Bilimleri Üniversitesi), Turkey (2026).

== Professional memberships ==
According to his university biography, Rizayev is a member of the American Dental Association, the European Association for Caries Research, and the Dental Association of the Commonwealth of Independent States.

== Medals and awards ==
- Badge marking the 20th anniversary of Uzbekistan's independence.
- Excellence in Healthcare badge, awarded by order of the Ministry of Health of Uzbekistan dated 6 November 2013, No. 455.
- Badge marking the 25th anniversary of Uzbekistan's independence.
- Annual medal of the sixth year of Pope Francis's pontificate, Vatican City (2018).
- Badge of Bukhara State Medical Institute named after Abu Ali ibn Sino, Uzbekistan (2019).
- Medal marking the 40th anniversary of South Kazakhstan Medical Academy, Kazakhstan (2019).
- Medal marking the 250th anniversary of Semmelweis University, Hungary (2019).
- Professor M. G. Prives Medal for contributions to the development of dentistry, First Pavlov State Medical University of St. Petersburg, Russia (2021).
- Honoured Dentist of Uzbekistan badge, Dental Association of Uzbekistan (2021).
- "Uzbekistan – the U.S. 30 years of friendship" medal (2022).
- Excellence in Higher Education badge, awarded by order of Uzbekistan's Minister of Higher Education, Science and Innovation dated 23 September 2025, No. 371.
- Medal recognising contributions to the development of dentistry worldwide, Academy of Dentistry International, United States.
