= Nanomedicine (Elsevier journal) =

Journal

- Discipline: Nanomedicine
- Language: English

Publication details
- History: 2005-present
- Publisher: Elsevier
- Frequency: Bimonthly

Standard abbreviations
- ISO 4: Nanomedicine

Indexing
- ISSN: 1549-9634 (print); 1549-9642 (web)
- LCCN: 2004212272
- OCLC no.: 54953169

Links
- Journal homepage; Online access

Nanomedicine: Nanotechnology, Biology and Medicine is a peer-reviewed medical journal published bimonthly by Elsevier. It covers research on nanoscience and nanotechnology applied to the life sciences and medicine. This includes basic, translational, and clinical research. Publishing formats include original articles, communications, reviews, perspectives, notes, and letters to the editor. The Editor in Chief is Professor Tatiana K. Bronich, PhD

== Abstracting and indexing ==
This journal is abstracted and indexed by:

- Biological Abstracts
- BIOSIS Previews
- Biotechnology Citation Index
- EMBASE
- MEDLINE
- Science Citation Index Expanded
- Scopus

== See also ==
- ACS Nano
- Journal of Biomedical Nanotechnology
- Nanotoxicology
