= Nanomedicine (Future Medicine journal) =

- Discipline: Nanomedicine
- Language: English
- Edited by: Kostas Kostarelos, Charles R. Martin

Publication details
- History: 2006–present
- Publisher: Future Medicine Ltd
- Frequency: Biweekly
- Impact factor: 4.727 (2016)

Standard abbreviations
- ISO 4: Nanomedicine (Lond.)

Indexing
- CODEN: NLUKAC
- ISSN: 1743-5889 (print); 1748-6963 (web)
- OCLC no.: 503720580

Links
- Journal homepage

Nanomedicine is a biweekly peer-reviewed medical journal covering research on medical nanoscale-structured material and devices, biotechnology devices and molecular machine systems, and nanorobotics applications in medicine. It was established in 2006 and is published by Future Medicine. The editors-in-chief are Kostas Kostarelos (University of Manchester) and Charles R. Martin (University of Florida).

== Abstracting and indexing ==
The journal is abstracted and indexed in the Biotechnology Citation Index, Chemical Abstracts, Current Contents/Life Sciences, Embase/Excerpta Medica, Inspec, Index Medicus/MEDLINE/PubMed, Science Citation Index Expanded, and Scopus. According to the Journal Citation Reports, the journal has a 2016 impact factor of 4.727, ranking it 20th out of 158 journals in the category "Biotechnology & Applied Microbiology" and 24th out of 86 journals in the category "Nanoscience & Nanotechnology".
