= Bernd Clement =

German pharmacist and chemist

Bernd Clement (born 9 October 1948 in Iserlohn, Germany) is a German pharmacist and chemist. He is mostly known for his research in biotransformation and prodrugs as well as his engagement in many German and international committees and scientific organisations. His most noticeable achievement was the discovery of the mARC enzyme.

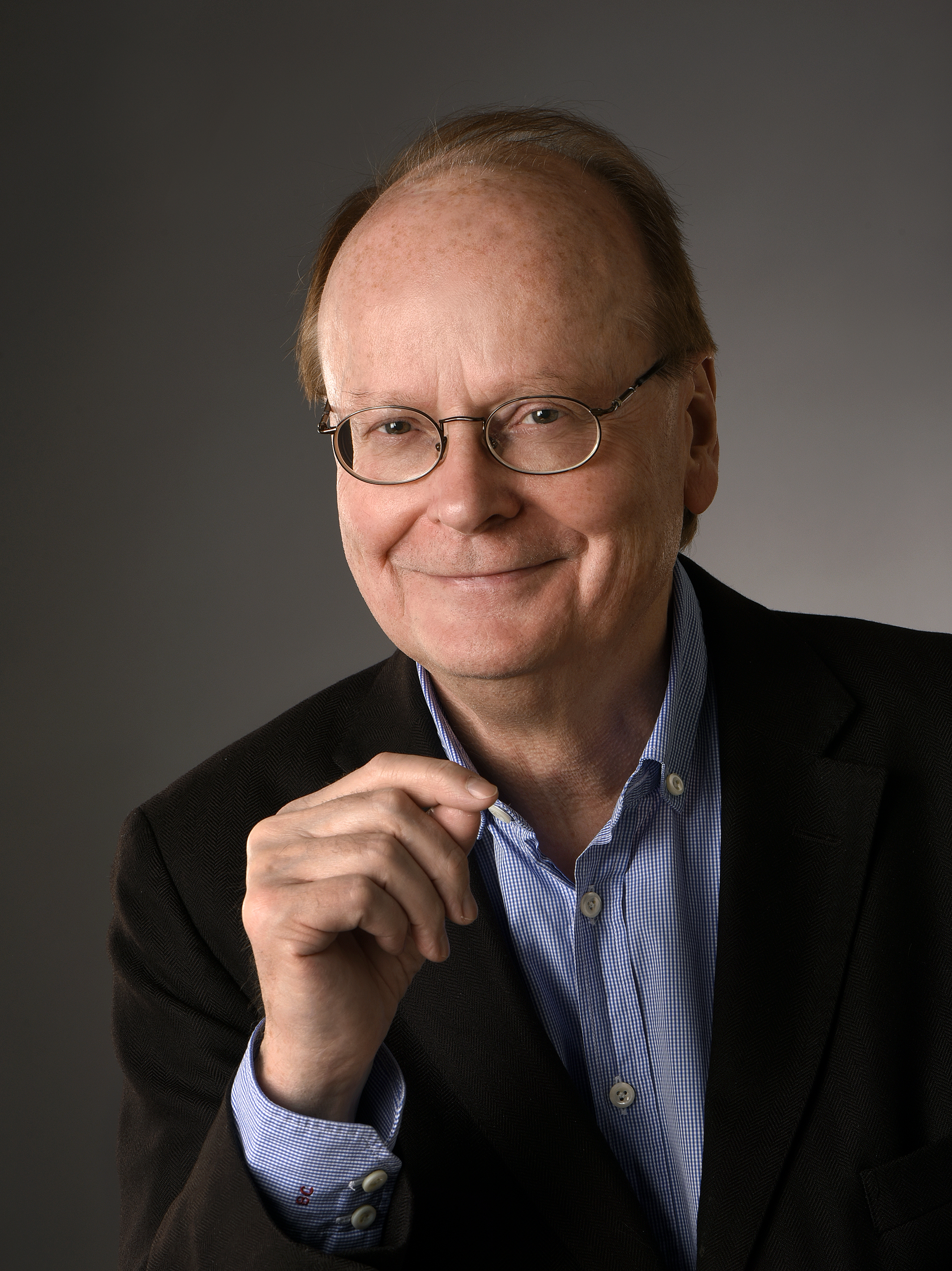
Bernd Clement, 2019

== Life and career ==
Bernd Clement graduated as a pharmacist from the University of Marburg in 1973. He was awarded his diploma in Chemistry in 1975. From 1975 until 1978 he completed his "Dr. rer. nat." (PhD) in Pharmaceutical and Medicinal Chemistry under supervision of Horst Böhme. From 1978 to 1979 he was a postdoctoral fellow at the University of London's Chelsea College with a scholarship from the German Research Foundation (DFG). From 1979 onwards, he was a junior group leader at the University of Freiburg, where he finished his "Habilitation" in 1985. Clement returned to Marburg in 1986, where he worked as a professor for Pharmaceutical and Medicinal Chemistry. In 1990 he accepted a professorship at the University of Kiel for the same subject. He was offered professorships in Tübingen, Münster and Innsbruck but declined.

== Committees and scientific organisations ==
Clement was and is reviewer for various scientific journals. Since 2003, he is the European editor for Drug Metabolism Reviews.

He has furthermore had various positions at the University of Kiel: for example, from 1999 to 2002, he was vice-dean of the faculty for mathematics and science and from 2004 to 2016 executive director of the Pharmaceutical Institute.

Additionally, Clement has held positions in scientific organisations. He was head of the division for Pharmaceutical and Medicinal Chemistry within the German Pharmaceutical Society (DPhG). From 2007 until today he has been the head of the association of pharmacy professors in Germany (VdPPHI). From 2014 to 2019 he was speaker of the conference of faculties for mathematics and science (MNFT). He represented the natural sciences in the board of the general faculty conference (AFT).

Clement was member of a committee advising the federal ministry for health about reforming the pharmacists' education and continued his commitment on this issue afterwards. He is member of the advisory board of the institute for exam questions in medicine and pharmacy (IMPP).

On the international level, he was a member of the council of both the European Federation for Medicinal Chemistry (EFMC) and the International Society for the Study of Xenobiotics (ISSX). For the former, he served as "chair" for the International Symposium of Medicinal Chemistry (EFMC-ISMC) in Berlin.

== Research ==
Clement is author of more than 150 publications in scientific journals and has supervised more than 90 PhD students. Key aspect of his research is biotransformation, in particular N-reduction catalysed by the mitochondrial amidoxime reducing component (mARC), which was utilised in the development of prodrugs for nitrogen-containing drug substances. Furthermore, his group works on novel topoisomerase inhibitors for the treatment of cancer.

== Awards and honours ==
For his research, many awards have been given to Clement. In 1998 and 2007, he received the Phoenix Science Award and in 2003 the animal welfare award of Schleswig-Holstein. For his life's achievements, he was awarded the Carl Mannich Medal in 2016, the highest award of the German Pharmaceutical Society. Furthermore, the European Federation for Medicinal Chemistry made him a life-long honorary fellow in 2021.
