= Future Medicinal Chemistry =

- Discipline: Medical chemistry
- Language: English

Publication details
- History: 2009–present
- Publisher: Future Medicine Ltd
- Frequency: 24/year
- Impact factor: 4.767 (2021)

Standard abbreviations
- ISO 4: Future Med. Chem.

Indexing
- CODEN: FMCUA7
- ISSN: 1756-8919 (print); 1756-8927 (web)
- OCLC no.: 762952421

Links
- Journal homepage

Future Medicinal Chemistry is a peer-reviewed medical journal covering all aspects of medicinal chemistry, including drug discovery, pharmacology, in silico drug design, structural characterization techniques, ADME-Tox investigations, and science policy, economic and intellectual property issues. It was established in 2009 and is published by Future Science. The editors-in-chief are Iwao Ojima (The State University of New York at Stony Brook) and Jonathan Baell (Monash University).

== Abstracting and indexing ==
The journal is abstracted and indexed by BIOSIS Previews, Chemical Abstracts, Chemistry Citation Index, Embase/Excerpta Medica, Index Medicus/MEDLINE/PubMed, Science Citation Index Expanded, and Scopus. According to the Journal Citation Reports, the journal has a 2020 impact factor of 3.808.
