= Ivano-Frankivsk National Medical University =

Public university in Ivano-Frankivsk, Ukraine

Coordinates: 48.9216°N 24.7088°E

- ДЗВО "Івано-Франківський національний медичний університет"
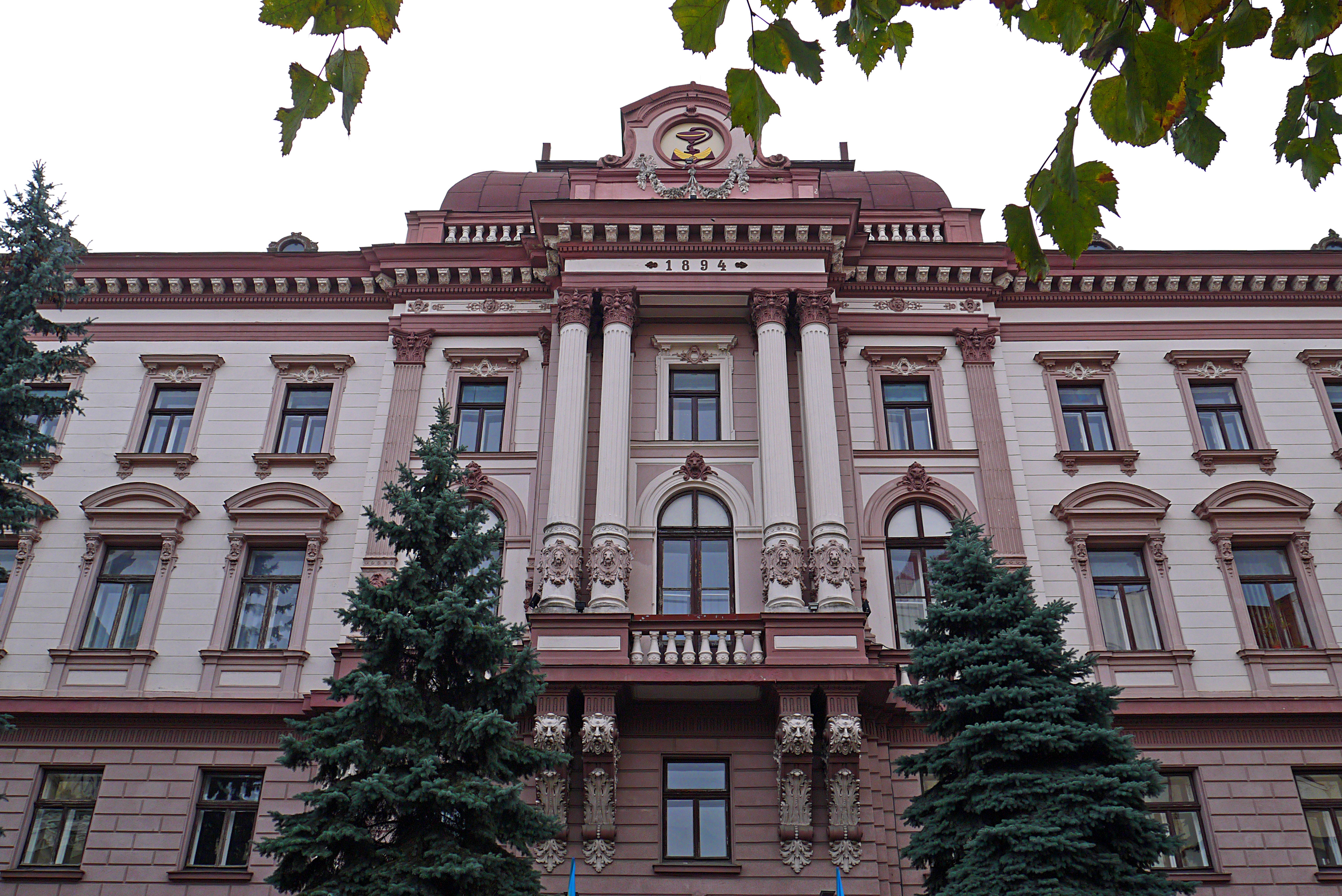
- Type: Public medical university
- Established: 1945
- Accreditation: Ministry of Education and Science of Ukraine
- Affiliations: Ministry of Health of Ukraine
- Academic affiliations: WHO, PMDC, MCI, Medical and Dental Council of Europe, Asia, Africa, and many countries
- Rector: Mykola Rozhko
- Students: ~4,800
- Location: Halytska 2, Ivano-Frankivsk, 76000, Ukraine
- Website: www.ifnmu.edu.ua

The Ivano-Frankivsk National Medical University (Ukrainian: Івано-Франківський національний медичний університет) is a state-sponsored university of higher education in Ivano-Frankivsk, Ukraine.

The university is an accredited Higher education institution and provides medical education from undergraduate to postgraduate level. The university history started in 1945 and is listed in the WHO Directory of Medical Schools and in the US FAIMER International Medical Education Directory (IMED).

The university is one of the few Medical Universities in Ukraine to be designated as a “National Medical University” by the government of Ukraine.

== Courses ==
=== Majors ===
- General Medicine (Doctor of Medicine degree) – 6-year course
- Dentistry (Doctor of Dentistry degree) – 5-year course
- Pediatrics (Doctor of Medicine degree) – 6-year course
- Pharmacy (Bachelor of Pharmacy degree) – 5-year course
- Nursing (RN) – 3- / 4-year course
- Prosthodontics (MDS / Clinical Residency) – 2-year course

=== Educational and qualification levels ===
- Educational and Qualification levels:
- Specialist (MD, MDD)
- Master of Medicine (Pharmacy)
- Ph.D.

=== Postgraduate training ===
- Internship
- Clinical Residentura
- Master and PhD courses
- Specialization and Post-Diploma Training for Doctors

== Notable alumni ==
- Nazariy Mykhaylyuk
- Shimon Rochkind
- Anatoly Skalny

== See also ==
- List of universities in Ukraine
- List of medical universities in Ukraine
