= Contraindication =

Condition that serves as a reason not to take a certain medical treatment

In medicine, a contraindication is a condition (a situation or factor) that serves as a reason not to take a certain medical treatment due to the harm that it would cause the patient. Contraindication is the opposite of indication, which is a reason to use a certain treatment.

Absolute contraindications are contraindications for which there are no reasonable circumstances for undertaking a course of action (that is, overriding the prohibition). For example:

- Children and teenagers with viral infections should not be given aspirin because of the risk of Reye syndrome.
- A person with an anaphylactic food allergy should never eat the food to which they are allergic.
- A person with hemochromatosis should not be administered iron preparations.
- Some medications are so teratogenic that they are absolutely contraindicated in pregnancy; examples include thalidomide and isotretinoin.

Relative contraindications are contraindications for circumstances in which the patient is at higher risk of complications from treatment, but these risks may be outweighed by other considerations or mitigated by other measures. For example, pregnant individuals should normally avoid getting X-rays, but the risk from radiography may be outweighed by the benefit of diagnosing (and then treating) a serious condition such as tuberculosis.

Another principal pair of terms for relative contraindications versus absolute contraindications is cautions versus contraindications, or (similarly) precautions versus contraindications: these pairs of terms are respectively synonymous. Which pair is used depends on nomenclature enforced by each organization's style. For example, the British National Formulary uses the cautions versus contraindications pair, and various U.S. CDC webpages use precautions versus contraindications. The logic of the latter two styles is the idea that readers must never be confused: the word contraindication in that usage always is meant in its absolute sense, providing unmistakable word-sense disambiguation.

== See also ==
- Classification of Pharmaco-Therapeutic Referrals
- Drug reaction testing
- Indication (medicine)
- Never events
