= Metabolic Brain Disease =

- Discipline: Neurology
- Language: English

Publication details
- History: 1986-present
- Publisher: Springer Science+Business Media
- Frequency: Quarterly
- Impact factor: 3.655 (2021)

Standard abbreviations
- ISO 4: Metab. Brain Dis.

Indexing
- CODEN: MBDIEE
- ISSN: 0885-7490 (print); 1573-7365 (web)
- OCLC no.: 12712938

Links
- Journal homepage; Online access

Metabolic Brain Disease is a quarterly peer-reviewed medical journal covering the study of metabolic brain diseases. It was established in 1986 and is published by Springer Science+Business Media. The editor-in-chief is Liang Oscar Qiang (Drexel University). According to the Journal Citation Reports, the journal has a 2021 impact factor of 3.655.
