= Charles R. Martin =

American chemist

Charles R. Martin (born November 20, 1959) is an American Distinguished Professor of chemistry at University of Florida. He is a Nanotechnology expert and a pioneer of membrane-based template synthesis of nanomaterials. He is listed as one of the World's Top 100 Chemists of the past decade (2000–2010) by Thomson Reuters. He is also a musician and songwriter in Gainesville, Florida.

== Education and academic career ==
=== Education ===
Martin graduated with high distinction from Centre College of Kentucky in 1975 and was elected to Phi Beta Kappa. He obtained a Ph.D. in analytical chemistry in 1980 under the direction of Prof. Henry Freiser. He was a Robert A. Welch Postdoctoral Fellow with Prof. Allen J. Bard in University of Texas at Austin.

=== Research in Texas A&M University ===
Martin began his academic career as an assistant professor in Texas A&M university in 1981. He became the first person to get tenure as an analytical chemist. He became a full professor in 1990. Beginning in the 1980s, his research group pioneered a versatile method for preparing nanomaterials called template synthesis. This synthesis method is now used in laboratories throughout the world.

=== Research in Colorado State University ===
In 1990, Martin moved to Colorado State University. He used the template synthesis method to fabricate nanotubes and nanowires of a wide range of materials. Many important applications such as separation, electrochemical energy storage, and electrochemical analysis have been explored.

=== Research in University of Florida ===
Martin moved to University of Florida in 1999. He is currently the Colonel Allan R. and Margaret G. Crow Professor of Chemistry in University of Florida. He became University Distinguished Professor in 2006, one of only 70 University Professorships in UF. Martin's current research interests are applications of template-prepared nanotubes and nanotube membranes in biosensing and electrochemistry.

== Awards and achievement ==
Among his Awards, Martin was the recipient of the Carl Wagner Memorial Award of the Electrochemical Society (1999), The Florida Award of the Florida ACS (2005), Fellow of Electrochemical Society (2005), Nano 50 Innovator Award from Nanotech Briefs (2007), the Charles N. Reilley Award of the Society for Electroanalytical Chemistry (2009), and the American Chemical Society Division of Analytical Chemistry Award in Electrochemistry (2010).

== Music ==
Besides his academic success, Martin is a musician and songwriter in Gainesville Florida. He had four albums with bands dblWiDE and The Righteous Kind and the solo album Genius Boy Music was released on November 22, 2013.
