= Pharmacognosy Communications =

- Discipline: Pharmacognosy
- Language: English

Publication details
- History: 2011-present
- Publisher: EManuscript Services (India)
- Frequency: Quarterly

Standard abbreviations
- ISO 4: Pharmacogn. Commun.

Indexing
- ISSN: 2249-0159 (print); 2249-0167 (web)

Links
- Journal homepage

Pharmacognosy Communications is a peer-reviewed open-access pharmacy journal published by EManuscript Services on behalf of Pharmacognosy Network Worldwide. It is a quarterly publication edited by pharmacognosist Ian Edwin Cock, Griffith University, Australia. It publishes articles on the subjects of pharmacognosy, natural products, phytochemistry, and phytomedicine.

The journal is indexed with CAB Abstracts, Chemical Abstracts, EBSCO, Google Scholar, Index Copernicus, OpenJGate, ProQuest, and Ulrich's Periodicals Directory.

Phcog.net (Pharmacognosy Network Worldwide) appeared on Beall's list from October 2012 through September 12, 2015.
