= Drug Metabolism Reviews =

- Discipline: Pharmaceutical Science
- Language: English

Publication details
- History: First published 1972
- Publisher: Informa Pharmaceutical Science
- Frequency: Quarterly
- Open access: No
- Impact factor: 5.356 (2014)

Standard abbreviations
- ISO 4: Drug Metab. Rev.

Indexing
- ISSN: 0360-2532 (print); 1097-9883 (web)

Links
- Journal homepage

Established in 1972, Drug Metabolism Reviews is an academic journal that publishes review articles on all aspects of drug metabolism research. It is the official journal of the International Society for the Study of Xenobiotics (ISSX).

The journal is published by Informa. Jack A. Hinson, Professor and Director of the Division of Toxicology at University of Arkansas for Medical Sciences, serves as its editor-in-chief.

== Core areas ==
Topics covered include:

- Established, new and potential drugs
- Environmentally toxic chemicals
- Absorption
- Metabolism and excretion
- Enzymology, including all living species.

== Publication format ==
The journal publishes 4 issues per year in simultaneous print and online editions. All back-issues of the journal are available online and are hosted on the publisher's website.

== Impact factor ==
According to ISI it received an impact factor of 5.356 as reported in the 2014 Journal Citation Reports by Thomson Reuters, ranking it 16th out of 254 journals in the category "Pharmacology & Pharmacy".

== Notable people ==
- Bernd Clement, European editor since 2003
