= Clinical Pharmacokinetics =

- Discipline: Drug therapy, pharmacology
- Language: English
- Edited by: Amitabh Prakash & Anton van Rensburg

Publication details
- History: 1976–present
- Publisher: Adis International (Springer Nature) (New Zealand)
- Frequency: Monthly
- Open access: Hybrid
- Impact factor: 4.0 (2024)

Standard abbreviations
- ISO 4: Clin. Pharmacokinet.

Indexing
- ISSN: 0312-5963 (print); 1179-1926 (web)

Links
- Journal homepage; Online archive

Clinical Pharmacokinetics is a peer-reviewed medical journal published by Adis International (Springer Nature) that covers topics related to pharmacokinetics. According to the Journal Citation Reports, the journal has a 2024 Impact Factor™ of 4.0 ranked 82 of 352 journals in the Pharmacology & Pharmacy category [Clarivate Analytics]; 2024 CiteScore™ of 7.8 ranked 41 of 275 journals in the Pharmacology [Medical] category [Scopus])
