= AAPS PharmSciTech =

- Discipline: Pharmaceutical sciences
- Language: English
- Edited by: Robert O. Williams III

Publication details
- History: 2000-present
- Publisher: Springer Science+Business Media on behalf of the American Association of Pharmaceutical Scientists
- Frequency: Bimonthly
- Impact factor: 4.026 (2021)

Standard abbreviations
- ISO 4: AAPS PharmSciTech

Indexing
- CODEN: AAPHFZ
- ISSN: 1530-9932
- LCCN: 00215572
- OCLC no.: 44575164

Links
- Journal homepage; Online archive; Journal page at society website

AAPS PharmSciTech is a bimonthly peer-reviewed scientific journal covering all aspects of the pharmaceutical sciences. The editor-in-chief is Robert O. Williams III (University of Texas at Austin). The journal was established in 2000 and is published by Springer Science+Business Media on behalf of the American Association of Pharmaceutical Scientists.

== Abstracting and indexing ==
The journal is abstracted and indexed in:

- Chemical Abstracts Service
- CSA databases
- Embase
- Index Medicus/MEDLINE/PubMed
- ProQuest databases
- Science Citation Index Expanded
- Scopus

According to the Journal Citation Reports, the journal has a 2021 impact factor of 4.026.

== See also ==
- List of pharmaceutical sciences journals
