= Physiology, Physiological Chemistry, Pharmacology =

Physiology, Physiological Chemistry, Pharmacology, with the parallel German title Berichte Physiologie, physiologische Chemie und Pharmakologie (ISSN 0005-9048), was a German medical journal with a focus on physiology, physiological chemistry and pharmacology, published by Springer. It was established by Carl Oppenheimer, Paul Ehrlich, Emil Fischer, Albrecht Kossel, Ernst Leopold Salkowski and Nathan Zuntz in 1902, originally titled Biochemisches Zentralblatt and later retitled Zentralblatt für Biochemie und Biophysik. It was retitled Berichte über die gesamte Physiologie und experimentelle Pharmakologie (ISSN 0366-0214) in 1920, which is sometimes known as Rona's Berichte, and obtained its final title in 1969. The journal ceased publication in 1980.
