= Archives of Toxicology =

- Discipline: Toxicology
- Language: English
- Edited by: Jan G. Hengstler

Publication details
- Former names: Sammlung von Vergiftungsfällen, Archiv für Toxikologie
- History: 1930-current
- Publisher: Springer Science+Business Media
- Frequency: Monthly
- Impact factor: 10.9 (2025)

Standard abbreviations
- ISO 4: Arch. Toxicol.

Indexing
- CODEN: ATSUDG
- ISSN: 0340-5761 (print); 1432-0738 (web)
- LCCN: 80647079
- OCLC no.: 223695734

Links
- Journal homepage; Online archive

Archives of Toxicology is a peer-reviewed medical journal covering all aspects of toxicology. It was established in 1930 as Sammlung von Vergiftungsfällen, renamed in 1954 into Archiv für Toxikologie and obtained its current title in 1974. The journal is published by Springer Science+Business Media and the editor-in-chief is Jan G. Hengstler (Leibniz Research Centre for Working Environment and Human Factors).

== Abstracting and indexing ==
The journal is abstracted and indexed in:

- PubMed/MEDLINE
- Scopus
- Science Citation Index
- EMBASE
- Chemical Abstracts Service
- EBSCO databases
- CAB International
- Abstracts in Anthropology
- Academic OneFile
- AGRICOLA
- Aquatic Sciences and Fisheries Abstracts
- Biological Abstracts
- BIOSIS Previews
- CAB Abstracts
- ChemWeb
- Current Contents/Life Sciences
- Elsevier BIOBASE
- Food Science and Technology Abstracts
- Global Health
- INIS Atomindex
- International Bibliography of Book Reviews
- International Bibliography of Periodical Literature
- PASCAL

According to the Journal Citation Reports, the journal has a 2025 impact factor of 10.9.
