= Pharmacological Research =

- Discipline: Pharmacology
- Language: English
- Edited by: Emilio Clementi

Publication details
- Former name: Pharmacological Research Communications
- History: 1969–present
- Publisher: Elsevier
- Frequency: Monthly
- Impact factor: 12.5 (2025)

Standard abbreviations
- ISO 4: Pharmacol. Res.

Indexing
- CODEN: PHMREP
- ISSN: 1043-6618 (print); 1096-1186 (web)

Links
- Journal homepage; Online access

Pharmacological Research is a monthly peer-reviewed scientific journal covering pharmacology. It was established in 1969 as Pharmacological Research Communications, obtaining its current name in 1989. It is published by Elsevier and the editor-in-chief is Emilio Clementi (University of Milan). According to the Journal Citation Reports, the journal has a 2025 impact factor of 12.5.
