= Therapeutic Advances in Drug Safety =

- Discipline: Pharmacotherapy
- Language: English

Publication details
- History: 2010–present
- Publisher: SAGE Publishing
- Frequency: Continuous
- Open access: Yes
- License: CC-BY-ND

Standard abbreviations
- ISO 4: Ther. Adv. Drug Saf.

Indexing
- ISSN: 2042-0986 (print); 2042-0994 (web)
- LCCN: 2011243267
- OCLC no.: 696627857

Links
- Journal homepage; Online access; Online archive

Therapeutic Advances in Drug Safety is a peer-reviewed open-access medical journal published by SAGE Publishing covering research on drug safety. It was established in 2010 and the editor-in-chief is Arduino A. Mangoni (Flinders University).
