= Drug reaction testing =

Drug reaction testing uses a genetic test to predict how a particular person will respond to various prescription and non-prescription medications. It checks for genes that code for specific liver enzymes which activate, deactivate, or are influenced by various drugs.

There are currently four genetic markers commonly tested for: 2D6, 2C9, 2C19, and 1A2.

This testing has been done for some time by drug companies working on new drugs, but is relatively newly available to the general public. Strattera is the first drug to mention the test in the official documentation, although it doesn't specifically recommend that patients get the test before taking the medication.

There are four possible categories for each marker: poor metabolizer, intermediate metabolizer, extensive metabolizer, or ultra-extensive metabolizer. Different testing companies may call these by different names. Extensive metabolizers (that is, people who are extensive metabolizers of a given type) are the most common, and are the type of people for which drugs are designed. Up to 7% of Caucasians are poor metabolizers of drugs metabolized by the CYP2D6 enzyme.

People who cannot metabolize a drug will require a much lower dose than is recommended by the manufacturer, and those who metabolize it quickly may require a higher dose. Some drugs, such as codeine, will not be effective in people without the requisite enzymes to activate them.

People who are poor metabolizers of a drug may overdose while taking less than the recommended dose.

== See also ==
- Medical prescription
- Contraindication
- Cytochrome P450
- Drug metabolism
