= Journal of Oncology Pharmacy Practice =

The Journal of Oncology Pharmacy Practice
- Discipline: Pharmacology & Toxicology
- Language: English
- Edited by: Barry R. Goldspiel

Publication details
- History: 1995 -present
- Publisher: SAGE Publications
- Frequency: Bi-monthly
- Impact factor: (2010)

Standard abbreviations
- ISO 4: J. Oncol. Pharm. Pract.

Indexing
- ISSN: 1078-1552
- LCCN: 95005896
- OCLC no.: 300275169

Links
- Journal homepage; Online access; Online archive

The Journal of Oncology Pharmacy Practice is a peer-reviewed academic journal that publishes papers bi-monthly in the field of Pharmacology. The journal's editor is Barry R. Goldspiel. It has been in publication since 1995 and is currently published by SAGE Publications in association with the International Society of Oncology and Pharmacy Practitioners.

== Scope ==
The Journal of Oncology Pharmacy Practice is dedicated to educating health professionals about providing pharmaceutical care to patients with cancer. The journal publishes case reports and consensus guidelines, information on new products and research reviews. The Journal of Oncology Pharmacy Practice also contains regular updates on ISOPP activities, as well as practical issues relating to oncology pharmacy and worker safety.

== Abstracting and indexing ==
The Journal of Oncology Pharmacy Practice is abstracted and indexed in the following databases:

- Academic Premier
- Biosciences Citation Index
- EMBASE
- MEDLINE
- Social Sciences Citation Index Expanded
- SCOPUS
