= International Journal of Pharma and Bio Sciences =

- Discipline: Pharmaceutical and biological sciences
- Language: English
- Edited by: P. Muthuprasanna

Publication details
- History: 2010-present
- Publisher: UBI Journals
- Frequency: Quarterly

Standard abbreviations
- ISO 4: Int. J. Pharma Bio Sci.

Indexing
- CODEN: IJPBJ2
- ISSN: 0975-6299
- OCLC no.: 863099360

Links
- Journal homepage; Online access; Online archives

The International Journal of Pharma and Bio Sciences is a quarterly scientific journal covering research in pharmaceutical and biological sciences. It was established in 2010 and the editor-in-chief is Guru Prasad Mohanta (Annamalai University).

The journal was placed on Jeffrey Beall's list of "Potential, possible, or probable" predatory scholarly open-access journals. Although the journal charges article processing fees, readers have to subscribe to the journal or buy articles individually.

== Abstracting and indexing ==
The journal is abstracted and indexed in Chemical Abstracts Service and Embase.

From 2010 to 2014, and again in 2016, the journal was indexed in Scopus. Indexing was discontinued for "publication concerns".
