= International Journal of Clinical Pharmacy =

- Discipline: Pharmacy
- Language: English
- Edited by: J. W.F. van Mil

Publication details
- Former name(s): Pharmacy World & Science
- History: 1979-present
- Publisher: Springer Science+Business Media
- Frequency: Bimonthly

Standard abbreviations
- ISO 4: Int. J. Clin. Pharm.

Indexing
- CODEN: IJCPKE
- ISSN: 2210-7703 (print); 2210-7711 (web)
- OCLC no.: 747224479

Links
- Journal homepage; Online access; Online archive

The International Journal of Clinical Pharmacy is a bimonthly peer-reviewed medical journal covering all aspects of clinical pharmacy and related practice-oriented subjects. It was established in 1965 and is published by Springer Science+Business Media.. The editor-in-chief is Professor Derek Stewart. The journal was called Pharmacy World & Science until 2010. According to the Journal Citation Reports, the journal has a 2021 impact factor of 2.305.
