= Current Trends in Biotechnology and Pharmacy =

- Discipline: Biotechnology, Pharmacy
- Language: English
- Edited by: K.R.S.Sambasiva Rao

Publication details
- History: 2007-present
- Publisher: Association of Biotechnology and Pharmacy (India)
- Frequency: Quarterly

Standard abbreviations
- ISO 4: Curr. Trends Biotechnol. Pharm.

Indexing
- ISSN: 0973-8916 (print); 0973-8916 (web)

Links
- Journal homepage

Current Trends in Biotechnology and Pharmacy is an international quarterly research journal dedicated to pharmaceutical and biotechnology research. The journal is published by the Association of Biotechnology and Pharmacy.
