= BioImpacts =

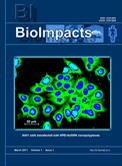
- Discipline: Biomedicine, pharmaceutical sciences, biochemistry
- Language: English
- Edited by: Yadollah Omidi

Publication details
- History: 2011–present
- Publisher: Tabriz University of Medical Sciences (Iran)
- Frequency: Quarterly
- Open access: Yes
- License: Creative Commons Attribution 4.0

Standard abbreviations
- ISO 4: BioImpacts

Indexing
- CODEN: BIOICT
- ISSN: 2228-5660 (print); 2228-5652 (web)
- OCLC no.: 898286958

Links
- Journal homepage; Online archive

BioImpacts is a quarterly peer-reviewed open access scientific journal covering all aspects of pharmaceutical and biomedical sciences published by Tabriz University of Medical Sciences. The journal was established in 2011 and the editor-in-chief is Yadollah Omidi (Tabriz University of Medical Sciences). The 2026 impact factor has been announced to 2.5.

== Abstracting and indexing ==
The journal is abstracted and indexed in Chemical Abstracts Service, Emerging Sources Citation Index, and Scopus.
