= Current Medicinal Chemistry =

- Discipline: Medicinal chemistry
- Language: English
- Edited by: Atta-ur-Rahman

Publication details
- History: 1994–present
- Publisher: Bentham Science Publishers
- Frequency: 42/year
- Impact factor: 4.1 (2022)

Standard abbreviations
- ISO 4: Curr. Med. Chem.

Indexing
- CODEN: CMCHE7
- ISSN: 0929-8673 (print); 1875-533X (web)
- OCLC no.: 31723164

Links
- Journal homepage; Online Access; Online archive

Current Medicinal Chemistry is a peer-reviewed medical journal published by Bentham Science Publishers. The editor-in-chief is Atta-ur-Rahman, FRS (Kings College University of Cambridge Cambridge, UK). The journal covers developments in medicinal chemistry and rational drug design and publishes original research reports and review papers.

A related journal titled Current Medicinal Chemistry – Anti-Cancer Agents ISSN 1568-0118 was launched in 2001, and retitled as Anti-Cancer Agents in Medicinal Chemistry from the start of 2006 with ISSN 1871-5206 (print), ISSN 1875-5992 (online).

== Abstracting and indexing ==
Current Medicinal Chemistry is indexed in the following databases:

- Chemical Abstracts Service/CASSI
- EMBASE
- EMBiology
- MEDLINE
- Science Citation Index Expanded
- Scopus

According to the Journal Citation Reports, the journal has a 2019 impact factor of 4.184, ranking it 16th out of 59 journals in the category "Chemistry, Medicinal".
