= Chinese Hospital Association =

The Chinese Hospital Association (Chinese: 中國醫院協會, officially the China Hospital Association or CHA) is a national, industry-wide, non-profit social organization composed of medical institutions at or above the secondary level that have obtained a medical institution practice license in accordance with the laws of the People's Republic of China. The mission of the association is to serve its members, serve the industry, serve the government, and serve the society.

The San Francisco Chinese Hospital in the United States is also registered with the name of “Chinese Hospital Association”.

== History ==
In 1996, the Chinese Hospital Management Association was established in Beijing.

In 2005, the association was renamed the “Chinese Hospital Association”.

Since 2020, the association has no longer been under the supervision of the National Health Commission of the People's Republic of China.

== Present situation ==
The association consists primarily of hospitals rated at secondary level or above, but also includes research institutes, social organizations, and relevant experts involved in hospital management and operations.

At present, the association has 58 branches, over 4,000 institutional members, and more than 10,000 individual members.

The mission of the association is to serve its members, serve the industry, serve the government, and serve the society; and to promote hospital reform and development.

The San Francisco Chinese Hospital in the United States is also registered as “Chinese Hospital Association”.

== Journals ==
The association publishes a number of academic journals, including

- 《中国医院》(Chinese Hospitals), launched in June 1997 and serves as the official journal of the Chinese Hospital Association.
- 《中国病案》(Chinese Medical Records), launched in May 2000 and is a core journal of Chinese science and technology.
- 《现代医院管理》(Modern Hospital Management), launched in 2003, and is hosted by the Chinese Hospital Association and China Medical University.

...
