= Journal of Pharmacy Practice =

- Discipline: Pharmacy
- Language: English
- Edited by: Michael Liu

Publication details
- History: 1988-present
- Publisher: SAGE Publications
- Frequency: Bimonthly

Standard abbreviations
- ISO 4: J. Pharm. Pract.

Indexing
- ISSN: 0897-1900
- OCLC no.: 645299220

Links
- Journal homepage; Online access; Online archive

The Journal of Pharmacy Practice is a bimonthly peer-reviewed healthcare journal that covers the field of pharmacy, including new drugs and therapies, pharmacokinetics, drug administration, and adverse drug reactions. The editor-in-chief is Michael Liu (Touro College of Pharmacy). It was established in 1988 and is currently published by SAGE Publications.

== Abstracting and indexing ==
The journal is abstracted and indexed in:

- Academic Complete
- Academic Premier
- CINAHL
- MEDLINE
- PsycINFO
- Scopus
