= Pharmaceuticals (journal) =

- Discipline: Pharmacology, Pharmaceutical sciences, Drug development
- Language: English

Publication details
- History: 2008–present
- Publisher: MDPI
- Frequency: Continuous
- Open access: Yes
- License: Creative Commons Attribution License
- Impact factor: 4.3 (2023)

Standard abbreviations
- ISO 4: Pharmaceuticals

Indexing
- ISSN: 1424-8247

Links
- Journal homepage

Pharmaceuticals is a peer-reviewed open-access scientific journal covering various aspects of pharmacology, pharmaceutical sciences, and drug development. It is published by MDPI and was established in 2004.

The journal publishes research articles, reviews, and case studies on topics related to drug discovery, clinical pharmacology, and pharmaceutical technology.

== Abstracting and indexing ==
The journal is abstracted and indexed in:

- DOAJ
- Science Citation Index Expanded
- Scopus

According to the Journal Citation Reports, the journal has a 2023 impact factor of 4.3.
