= Shimon Rochkind =

Israeli clinician and neurosurgeon

Professor Shimon Rochkind
- שמעון רושקינד
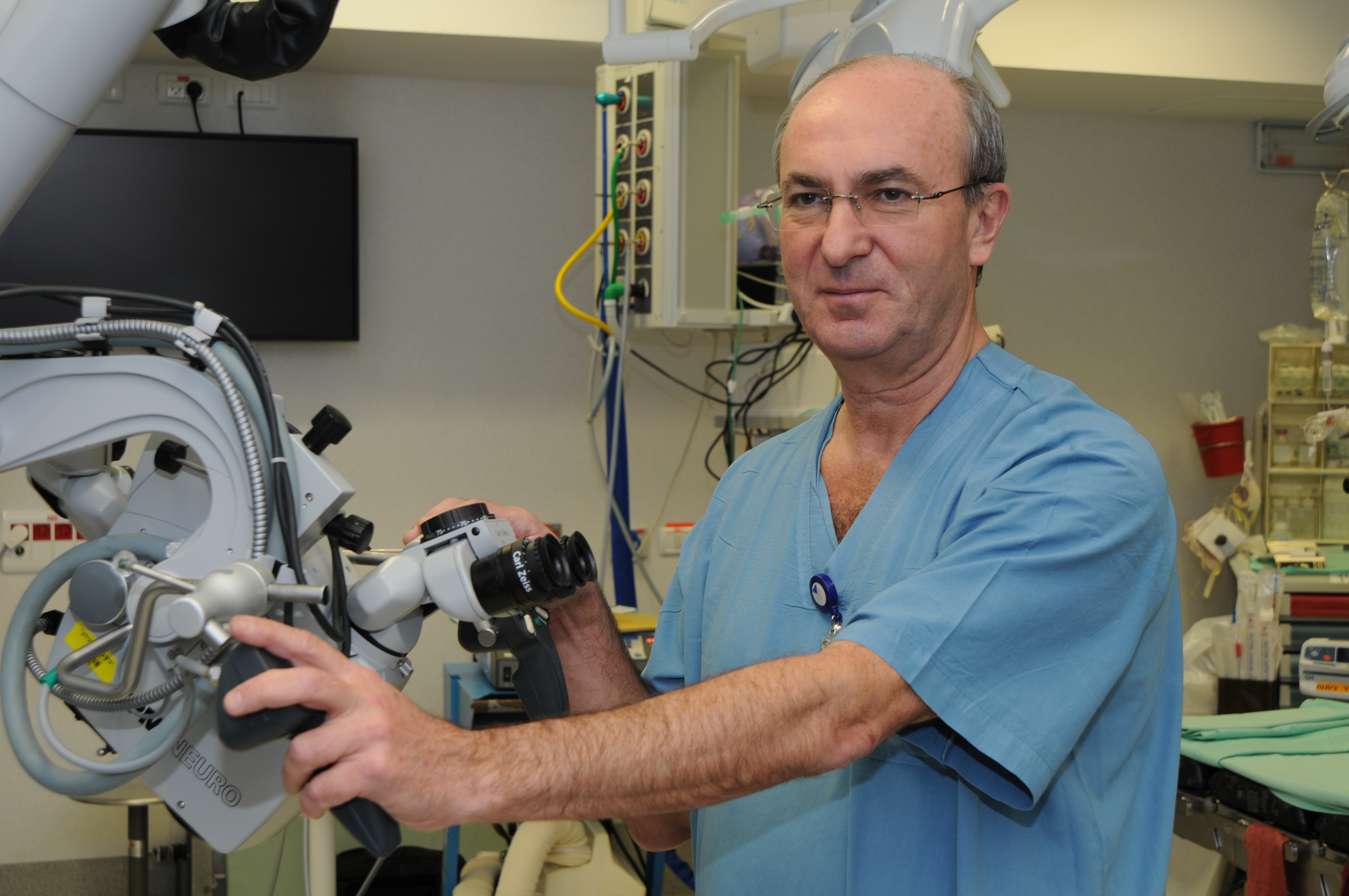
- Education: Ivano-Frankivsk National Medical University, Bar Ilan University
- Medical career
- Profession: Neurosurgery, Microsurgery, Neuroscience
- Institutions: Tel Aviv Sourasky Medical Center

Shimon Rochkind (Hebrew: שמעון רושקינד) is an Israeli clinician and an operating neurosurgeon. His professional interests include surgery on the peripheral nerves, the lumbar and sacral spine, brachial plexus and cauda equina. Rochkind pioneered the use of the laser therapy for the treatment of injuries in the peripheral nervous system. Currently he dedicates a fair share of his time to the scientific work: developing the matrix for peripheral nerve and spinal cord reconstruction.

== Education and clinical work ==
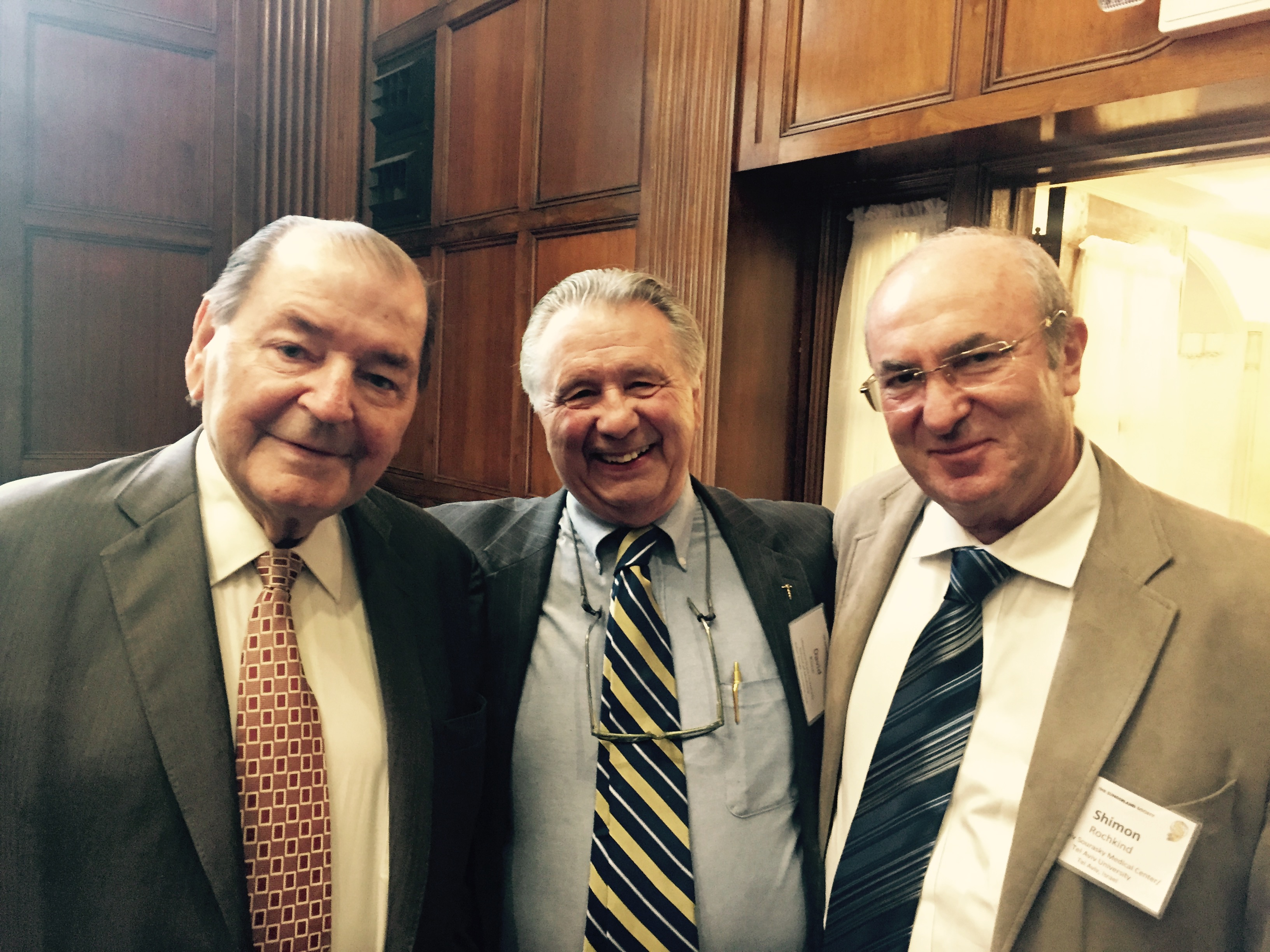
Prof. Rochkind (right) with prof. Hano Millesi and prof. David Kline in 2015

Shimon Rochkind had graduated with honors and received his medical degree from Ivano-Frankivsk National Medical University, Ukrainian SSR, in 1975. After arriving in Israel and serving in the Israeli Defense Forces (Major in Reserve) he completed his specialization in neurosurgery at the Tel Aviv Sourasky Medical Center in 1989. Then he completed a fellowship at the Hospital for Sick Children (Toronto), specializing in pediatric neurosurgery.

In 1992, he finished a senior fellowship in Groote Schuur Hospital, South Africa, specializing in the restoration of peripheral nerves and brachial plexus and later in 2003 an advanced clinical training for brachial plexus reconstructive surgery in Ogori Daiichi General Hospital, Japan. Prof. Rochkind had completed his Ph.D. Dissertation "Influence of Laser Phototherapy on Acetylcholine Receptors and Creatine Phosphokinase content in Denervated Muscle" in Bar Ilan University, Israel, in 2014.

In 2001 Rochkind had founded and headed the Division for Peripheral Nerve Reconstruction and the Research Center for Nerve Reconstruction in Tel Aviv Sourasky Medical Center. He had served as the Director of the Division since its foundation until 2020 and currently continues in his position as the Head of the Translational Medicine and Clinical Research Center for Nerve Reconstruction.

Shimon Rochkind is actively involved in neuro-biotechnological preclinical research for development of an innovative Reviving Matrix (Anti-gliotic Guiding Regenerative Gel) for Reconstruction of Severely Injured Peripheral Nerve and Spinal Cord. The "Matrix" is a special milieu that increases nerve growth, promotes recovery aiming, ultimately, at restoring the function of an injured peripheral nerve, and enables spinal cord repair.

Rochkind serves as an Associate Professor in Sackler School of Medicine, Tel Aviv University, and has received the Outstanding Teacher Award by the Sackler Faculty of Medicine. Internationally he serves as the Vice Chairman of Peripheral Nerve Surgery Committee of the World Federation of Neurosurgical Societies, a member of Section of Peripheral Nerve Surgery of European Association of Neurosurgical Societies, is a member of 26 international professional clinical and scientific associations. He is also a former president of Sunderland Society (an international group for the study of peripheral nerves) and a former president of World Association for Laser Therapy.

== Publications ==
Shimon Rochkind has more than 80 scientific publications and 29 sections of books.
