= Pharmaceutical Development and Technology =

- Discipline: Pharmaceutics
- Language: English
- Edited by: Raid Alany

Publication details
- History: 1996-present
- Publisher: Taylor & Francis
- Frequency: 10/year
- Impact factor: 3.915 (2021)

Standard abbreviations
- ISO 4: Pharm. Dev. Technol.

Indexing
- CODEN: PDTEFS
- ISSN: 1083-7450 (print); 1097-9867 (web)
- OCLC no.: 32876033

Links
- Journal homepage; Online access; Online archive

Pharmaceutical Development and Technology is a peer-reviewed pharmaceutical journal that is published by Taylor & Francis. It covers research on the design, development, manufacture, and evaluation of conventional and novel drug delivery systems, emphasizing practical solutions and applications to theoretical and research-based problems. The journal aims to publish significant, innovative and original research to advance the frontiers of pharmaceutical development and technology.

The editor-in-chief is Professor Raid Alany, Chair of Pharmaceutical Formulation and Drug Delivery (Kingston University); Honorary Professor of Pharmacy, The University of Auckland.
