= European Journal of Pharmaceutical Sciences =

- Discipline: Pharmaceutics
- Language: English
- Edited by: M. Brandl

Publication details
- History: 1993-present
- Publisher: Elsevier
- Frequency: 15/year
- Open access: Hybrid
- Impact factor: 4.3 (2023)

Standard abbreviations
- ISO 4: Eur. J. Pharm. Sci.

Indexing
- CODEN: EPSCED
- ISSN: 0928-0987 (print); 1879-0720 (web)
- LCCN: 94648379
- OCLC no.: 28704641

Links
- Journal homepage; Online access

The European Journal of Pharmaceutical Sciences is a peer-reviewed medical journal and the official journal of the European Federation for Pharmaceutical Sciences. It publishes research reports, review articles, and scientific commentaries on all aspects of the pharmaceutical sciences. The abstracts of the biennial European Congress of Pharmaceutical Sciences are published in a supplement of the journal.

== Abstracting and indexing ==
The journal is abstracted and indexed in BIOSIS Previews, Beilstein database, CAB Abstracts, Chemical Abstracts, Current Contents/Life Sciences, International Pharmaceutical Abstracts, EMBASE, MEDLINE, Natural Products Update/Royal Society of Chemistry, Science Citation Index, and Scopus.
