= Current Pharmaceutical Design =

- Discipline: Pharmacology and Medicinal Chemistry
- Language: English
- Edited by: Alessandro Antonelli

Publication details
- History: 1995-present
- Publisher: Bentham Science Publishers
- Frequency: 46/year
- Impact factor: 2.208 (2019)

Standard abbreviations
- ISO 4: Curr. Pharm. Des.

Indexing
- CODEN: CPDEFP
- ISSN: 1381-6128 (print); 1873-4286 (web)
- OCLC no.: 33146703

Links
- Journal homepage; Online access; Online archive

Current Pharmaceutical Design is a peer-reviewed medical journal which covers issues related to pharmacology and medicinal chemistry. Each issue is devoted to a single major therapeutic area. For each issue, an executive editor is chosen who is an acknowledged authority in that field.

The Journal is published by Bentham Science Publishers, which have faced criticism due to potentially predatory publishing tactics.

== Abstracting and indexing ==
Current Pharmaceutical Design is abstracted and indexed in:

- Chemical Abstracts Service
- Biochemistry & Biophysics Citation Index
- Cambridge Scientific Abstracts
- EMBiology
- MEDLINE
- Science Citation Index Expanded
- Scopus

According to the Journal Citation Reports, the journal has a 2019 impact factor of 2.208.
