= Journal of Trace Elements in Medicine and Biology =

- Discipline: Biochemistry; Medicinal chemistry Inorganic chemistry
- Language: English
- Edited by: Dirk Schaumlöffel

Publication details
- Former names: Journal of Trace Elements and Electrolytes in Health and Disease
- History: 1987–present
- Publisher: Elsevier
- Frequency: Bimonthly
- Impact factor: 3.755 (2017)

Standard abbreviations
- ISO 4: J. Trace Elem. Med. Biol.

Indexing
- CODEN: JTEBF
- ISSN: 0946-672X (print); 1878-3252 (web)
- LCCN: sv96006870
- OCLC no.: 300273847

Links
- Journal homepage; Online archive

The Journal of Trace Elements in Medicine and Biology is a bimonthly peer-reviewed medical journal covering the roles played by trace elements in medical and biological systems. It was established in 1987 as the Journal of Trace Elements and Electrolytes in Health and Disease, obtaining its current title in 1995. It is published by Elsevier on behalf of the Federation of European Societies on Trace Elements and Minerals (FESTEM), of which it is the official journal. The editor-in-chief is Dirk Schaumlöffel (Université de Pau et des Pays de l'Adour/Centre national de la recherche scientifique). According to the Journal Citation Reports, the journal has a 2017 impact factor of 3.755.
