= Drug Testing and Analysis =

- Discipline: Pharmacology
- Language: English
- Edited by: Mario Thevis

Publication details
- History: 2009–present
- Publisher: John Wiley & Sons
- Frequency: Monthly
- Impact factor: 3.345 (2020)

Standard abbreviations
- ISO 4: Drug Test. Anal.

Indexing
- CODEN: DTARBG
- ISSN: 1942-7603 (print); 1942-7611 (web)
- OCLC no.: 231680670

Links
- Journal homepage; Online access; Online archive

Drug Testing and Analysis is a monthly peer-reviewed scientific journal established in 2009 and published by John Wiley & Sons. It focuses on six key topics: sports doping, illicit/recreational drug use, pharmaceutics, toxico-pathology, forensics/homeland security, and environment.

The current editor-in-chief is Mario Thevis (German Sport University Cologne).

== Abstracting and indexing ==
The journal is abstracted and indexed in Chemical Abstracts Service, EMBASE, MEDLINE/PubMed, Science Citation Index Expanded, and Scopus.
