= Biological Trace Element Research =

- Discipline: Trace elements
- Language: English
- Edited by: John B. Vincent, Forrest H. Nielsen

Publication details
- History: 1979-present
- Publisher: Springer Science+Business Media
- Frequency: Monthly
- Open access: Hybrid
- Impact factor: 3.738 (2020)

Standard abbreviations
- ISO 4: Biol. Trace Elem. Res.

Indexing
- ISSN: 0163-4984 (print); 1559-0720 (web)
- OCLC no.: 47094574

Links
- Journal homepage

Biological Trace Element Research is a journal established in 1979 and published by Springer Science+Business Media. The editor-in-chief is M.F. Flores-Arce (International Association of Bioorganic Scientists). According to the Journal Citation Reports, the journal has a 2020 impact factor of 3.738.
