= Expert Opinion on Pharmacotherapy =

- Discipline: Pharmacotherapy
- Language: English
- Edited by: Dimitri P. Mikhailidis

Publication details
- History: 1999-present
- Publisher: Informa
- Frequency: 18/year
- Impact factor: 3.894 (2016)

Standard abbreviations
- ISO 4: Expert Opin. Pharmacother.

Indexing
- CODEN: EOPHF7
- ISSN: 1465-6566 (print); 1744-7666 (web)
- OCLC no.: 57378019

Links
- Journal homepage; Online access; Online archive

Expert Opinion on Pharmacotherapy is a peer-reviewed medical journal publishing review articles and original papers on new pharmacotherapies. It is published by Informa and the editor-in-chief is Dimitri P. Mikhailidis (Royal Free Hospital).

== Abstracting and indexing ==
The journal is abstracted and indexed in Chemical Abstracts, Current Contents/Clinical Medicine, EMBASE/Excerpta Medica, Index Medicus/MEDLINE, and the Science Citation Index Expanded. According to the Journal Citation Reports, the journal has a 2016 impact factor of 3.894.
