= Samarkand State Medical University =

Medical university in Uzbekistan

- Samarqand davlat tibbiyot universiteti
- Other name: Самаркандский государственный медицинский университет
- Former name: Samarkand State Medical Institute
- Type: Public university
- Established: May 7, 1930
- Rector: Jasur Rizayev
- Students: 10,880
- Location: Samarkand, Amir Temur Street, 18, Samarkand, Samarkand, 140100, Uzbekistan
- Website: www.sammu.uz

Samarkand State Medical University (Samarkand State Medical Institute before April 1, 2022), or SSMU, is a higher educational institution in Uzbekistan. The University is located in the city of Samarkand.

== History ==
Samarkand State Medical University was founded in May 1930 as the initiative of the Council of People's Commissars of the Uzbek SSR.

=== Rectors ===
Rectors of the university from its inception are:

- Nemcovich Lev Solomonovich (1930–1935)
- Nedosekov Yuliy Solomonovich (1935–1942)
- Professor Zahidov Hakim Zahidovich (1943–1945)
- Professor Abdullaev Rauf Abdullaevich (1945–1951): Honored scientist of Uzbekistan
- Adilov Aziz Kudratovich (1951–1955) Docent
- Professor Mirzamuhammedov Mannap Atamatovich (1955–1961). Leading pediatrician and Honored Scientist of Uzbekistan
- Haitov Musa Nazarovich (1961—1966 ) Docent, deputy of the Supreme Soviet of the Uzbek SSR, First Secretary of the Samarkand City Committee of the Uzbek SSR
- Professor Vahabova Uktam Karimovna (1966—1981 ) Honored Scientist of the Republic of Uzbekistan, Deputy of the Supreme Soviet of the Uzbek SSR.
- Professor Aripov Subhankul Aripovich (1981–1986) Honored Scientist and Doctor of the Republic of Uzbekistan.
- Kamalov Nuriddin Mirzayevich (1986—1995 ) Docent
- Professor Muminov Akram Ibragimovich (1995—2000 ) Honored Scientist of Republic of Uzbekistan.
- Professor Sobirov Bahodir Urdushevich (2000–2004)
- Shamsiyev Azamat Muhiddinovich (2004–2020) Professor. Member of the New York Academy of Sciences.
- Rizayev Jasur Alimdjanovich (from 2020) Professor

=== Institute during the Second World War ===
During the Second World War from 1942 to 1944, the Samarkand State Medical University (SamSMU), played a role in training medical personnel, providing medical assistance, and contributing to the war effort. It also helped in evacuating the Leningrad Military Medical Academy and Kuibyshev Military Medical Academy. It was under a military colonel at that time.

== Structure of the University ==
=== Faculties ===
There are 10 SSMU faculties:

- Faculty of Medicine, founded in 1930;
- Faculty of Pediatrics, founded in 1963;
- Faculty of Medical Pedagogy, founded in 2005;
- Nursing faculty founded in 2005;
- Faculty of Dentistry, founded in 2009;
- Faculty of Pharmacy, founded in 2009;
- Faculty of Medical Prophylactics, Public Health and Medical Biology, founded in 2020;
- International Faculty of medical education, founded in 2009;
- Faculty of Postgraduate Professional Training of Physicians, founded in 1981

Since 2020, the institute has launched 6 joint educational programs in the following fields:

- Medicine
- Pediatrics
- Dentistry
- Nursing
- Clinical Psychology
- Management: Healthcare management

=== Departments of Master's and Clinical Residency ===
In the departments of magistracy and clinical residency, specialists are trained in the following areas: obstetrics and gynecology; therapy (by directions) - Endocrinology, Cardiology, Neurology, Phthisiology, Narcology; otorhinolaryngology; ophthalmology; general oncology; surgery (by directions); anesthesiology and resuscitation; Traumatology and Orthopedics; forensic examination; pediatrics (by directions); pediatric surgery; dentistry (by directions); infectious diseases (by direction); pediatric neurology; functional and instrumental diagnostic methods (medical radiology); urology; neonatology; neurosurgery; dermatovenereology.

=== Department of Scientific Research, Innovation and Training of Scientific and Pedagogical Personnel ===
It is one of the main structural units of the university, which operates in accordance with the charter and organizes its activities on the basis of orders and orders of the rector, as well as the Academic Council of the university. In recent years, the training of scientific and pedagogical personnel at the highest level of the education system has begun to acquire significantly different scales and goals: specialists of the highest scientific qualification today need not only scientific and educational universities, but also the healthcare sector, as well as knowledge-intensive industries that determine the success of the development of an innovative economy. Scientific councils for awarding the academic degree of candidate and doctor of sciences have been created and are effectively functioning at SSMU.

In order to increase knowledge among young people in the field of innovative developments, the development of scientific thinking, independent work skills, and the development of creative abilities, the course "Fundamentals of Scientific Research and Innovative Activity", designed for 6 hours of training, has been introduced into the educational process of 4th year students in all areas of education. All conditions have been created for holding competitions for startup projects, an IT incubation center for startup projects has been opened, where favorable conditions will be reflected in the effective operation of small innovative projects, increasing their quality, quantity and implementation of original scientific and technical ideas among talented young people.

=== Faculty ===
In Samarkand State Medical University there are 83 departments, including courses where 624 scientists and teachers conduct scientific and pedagogical activities. Of these, 85 are doctors of science, and 265 are candidates of science.

== Information and educational resources ==
A modern information and resource center was commissioned for the students. The information and resource center created conditions for the provision of bibliographic information, and information and resource services to users of the scientific, methodological and information department. There is a separate hall for book exhibitions. The training hall is designed for 80 seats. The center's fund is currently filled with more than 300,000 copies of literature. In particular, over the past three years, more than 17,000 books have been received by the university library. Also in the library, there are 9,000 copies of educational literature in the amount of 344 pieces, created by the university teachers. The fund of the center also has rare scientific literature in the field of medicine, both domestic and imported from abroad.

== Clinics of the university ==
SamSMU has a clinic No. 1, designed for 375 beds, and a clinic No. 2, designed for 200 beds. Clinical bases for students are also all medical and diagnostic institutions of the city of Samarkand, where in the future they undergo practical training. According to the resolution of the President of the Republic of Uzbekistan Shavkat Mirziyoyev dated April 1, 2022 "On the establishment of Samarkand State Medical University and further improvement of the system of personnel training in this area", the following were established: Research Institute of Rehabilitation and Sports Medicine, Research Institute of Microbiology, Virology, Infectious and Parasitic Diseases named after L. M. Isaev, Republican Specialized Scientific and Practical Medical Center for Epidemiology, Microbiology, Infectious and Parasitic Diseases, Specialized Scientific and Practical Center for Neurosurgery and Neurorehabilitation, Scientific Center for Immunology, Allergology and Human Genomics.

== Sources ==
- Rector of Samarkand State Medical University
- Military-Medical Academy, St. Petersburg. Petrograd. Leningrad: Encyclopedic reference. — М.: Great Russian Encyclopedia. Ed. collegium: Belova L.N., Buldakov G. N., Degtyarev А. Ya. etc. 1992.
- Section History, Official website of the Samarkand State Medical University.
- Section History Archived 10.24.2015., Official website of the Samarkand State Medical University
