= Journal of Biomedical Nanotechnology =

- Discipline: Nanomedicine
- Language: English
- Edited by: Zhiyong Qian

Publication details
- History: 2005–present
- Publisher: American Scientific Publishers
- Frequency: Monthly
- Impact factor: (2017)

Standard abbreviations
- ISO 4: J. Biomed. Nanotechnol.

Indexing
- ISSN: 1550-7033 (print); 1550-7041 (web)
- LCCN: 2004212709
- OCLC no.: 55528989

Links
- Journal homepage

The Journal of Biomedical Nanotechnology is a monthly peer-reviewed scientific journal covering fundamental and applied research pertaining to nanotechnology applications in all fields of the life sciences. It was established in 2005 and is published by American Scientific Publishers, a company identified by Jeffrey Beall as a predatory publisher. The editor-in-chief is Zhiyong Qian.
