= Bentham Science Publishers =

Academic publishing company

- Founded: 1994
- Distribution: Global
- Publication types: Scientific journals, e-books
- No. of employees: 300 - 500
- Official website: benthamscience.com

Bentham Science Publishers is a company that publishes academic journals and scholarly publications in the scientific, technical, and medical fields, as well as e-books in the same areas. It publishes over 120 subscription-based academic journals and around forty open access journals.

As of 2023, a total of 66 different Bentham Science journals have received JCR impact factors, and they are a member of the Committee on Publication Ethics. Bentham Open, its open access division, has received criticism for questionable peer-review practices as well as invitation spam. Bentham Open was listed as a "potential, possible, or probable predatory scholarly open access publisher" in Jeffrey Beall's list of predatory publishers, before the list went defunct.

== History ==
Bentham Science Publishers was incorporated in 1994 by Atta-ur-Rahman and his friend Matthew Honan as a private business entity at the Sharjah Airport International Free Trade Zone in the United Arab Emirates. An investigative profile from Sujag notes the publisher had, in reality, however, operated out of Pakistan — for the first six years, from the premises of International Center for Chemical and Biological Sciences and then, from private residential blocks at Karachi — under the banner of a tax-exempt proxy firm, owned by Rahman's sons.

As of 2022, the publisher publishes more than 120 subscription-based journals, indexed in Scopus, Chemical Abstracts, MEDLINE, EMBASE, etc. Bentham Open Access published more than 150 peer-reviewed, free-to-view online journals under Bentham Open.

== Criticism of Bentham Open ==
The Bentham Open journals claim to employ peer review, although there have been disputes with this claim. Allegations of fake papers have circulated amongst the Bentham Open journals. One case included a fake paper that was generated using SCIgen in 2009, and was accepted for publication, though the paper was never officially published; the publisher has since contended that the acceptance was a play-along to catch the author. (Note: Also, another similar paper submitted to the Open Software Engineering Journal in 2009 as part of the same operation was rejected by the publisher after peer review.) The author, a graduate student at Cornell University, was motivated into the submission after being bombarded with unsolicited invitations to publish in Bentham's journals and offers to serve in their editorial boards for topics beyond his expertise. In consequence, some editors quit the collaboration with Bentham. In 2013, the now-discontinued The Open Bioactive Compounds Journal again accepted a blatantly bogus paper submitted as part of the Who's Afraid of Peer Review? sting.

Bentham Open has been accused of spamming scientists to become members of the editorial boards of its journals since 2008. In a 2017 study of invitation spam by publishers, Bentham Open was noted to be a habitual offender.

In 2009, the Bentham Open Science journal The Open Chemical Physics Journal published a study contending dust from the World Trade Center attacks contained "active nanothermite", a well known 9/11 conspiracy theory. The journal's editor-in-chief Marie-Paule Pileni claimed the article was published without her authorization, and resigned. In a July 2009 review of Bentham Open for The Charleston Advisor, Jeffrey Beall accused Bentham Open of exploiting the Open Access model to make quick money, and rejected that they employed any meaningful peer-review. Beall had since added Bentham Open to his list of "Potential, possible, or probable predatory scholarly open-access publishers".
