= List of Dove Medical Press academic journals =

This is a list of academic journals published by Dove Medical Press. Journals marked with a ^{†} were no longer in publication as of March 2019.

== A ==
- Adolescent Health, Medicine and Therapeutics
- Advanced Health Care Technologies^{†}
- Advances and Applications in Bioinformatics and Chemistry
- Advances in Genomics and Genetics^{†}
- Advances in Medical Education and Practice
- Ambulatory Anesthesia^{†}
- Antibody Technology Journal^{†}
- Application of Clinical Genetics

== B ==
- Biologics: Targets and Therapy
- Biosimilars^{†}
- Blood and Lymphatic Cancer: Targets and Therapy
- Botanics: Targets and Therapy^{†}
- Breast Cancer: Targets and Therapy

== C ==
- Cancer Management and Research
- Cell Health and Cytoskeleton^{†}
- Chronic Wound Care Management and Research
- ChronoPhysiology and Therapy^{†}
- Clinical and Experimental Gastroenterology
- Clinical Audit
- Clinical, Cosmetic and Investigational Dentistry
- Clinical, Cosmetic and Investigational Dermatology
- Clinical Epidemiology
- Clinical Interventions in Aging
- Clinical Oncology in Adolescents and Young Adults^{†}
- Clinical Ophthalmology
- Clinical Optometry
- Clinical Pharmacology: Advances and Applications
- ClinicoEconomics and Outcomes Research
- Comparative Effectiveness Research^{†}
- Core Evidence
- Current Biomarker Findings^{†}

== D ==
- Degenerative Neurological and Neuromuscular Disease
- Diabetes, Metabolic Syndrome and Obesity: Targets and Therapy
- Drug Design, Development and Therapy
- Drug, Healthcare and Patient Safety

== E ==
- Energy and Emission Control Technologies^{†}
- Eye and Brain

== G ==
- Gastrointestinal Cancer: Targets and Therapy^{†}

== H ==
- Hepatic Medicine: Evidence and Research
- HIV/AIDS – Research and Palliative Care
- Hypoxia

== I ==
- ImmunoTargets and Therapy
- Infection and Drug Resistance
- Innovation and Entrepreneurship in Health
- Integrated Blood Pressure Control
- Integrated Pharmacy Research and Practice
- International Journal of Chronic Obstructive Pulmonary Disease
- International Journal of Clinical Transfusion Medicine
- International Journal of General Medicine
- International Journal of High Throughput Screening^{†}
- International Journal of Interferon, Cytokine and Mediator Research^{†}
- International Journal of Nanomedicine
- International Journal of Nephrology and Renovascular Disease
- International Journal of Wine Research
- International Journal of Women's Health
- International Medical Case Reports Journal

== J ==
- Journal of Asthma and Allergy
- Journal of Biorepository Science for Applied Medicine^{†}
- Journal of Blood Medicine
- Journal of Experimental Pharmacology
- Journal of Healthcare Leadership
- Journal of Hepatocellular Carcinoma
- Journal of Inflammation Research
- Journal of Multidisciplinary Healthcare
- Journal of Neurorestoratology^{†}
- Journal of Pain Research
- Journal of Receptor, Ligand and Channel Research^{†}
- Journal of Parkinsonism and Restless Legs Syndrome
- Journal of Vascular Diagnostics and Interventions

== L ==
- Local and Regional Anesthesia
- Lung Cancer: Targets and Therapy

== M ==
- Medical Devices: Evidence and Research
- Medicolegal and Bioethics
- Metalloproteinases in Medicine

== N ==
- Nanobiosensors in Disease Diagnosis^{†}
- Nanotechnology, Science and Applications
- Nature and Science of Sleep
- Neurobehavioral HIV Medicine^{†}
- Neuropsychiatric Disease and Treatment
- Neuroscience and Neuroeconomics^{†}
- Nursing: Research and Reviews
- Nutrition and Dietary Supplements

== O ==
- Oncolytic Virotherapy
- OncoTargets and Therapy
- Open Access Animal Physiology^{†}
- Open Access Bioinformatics^{†}
- Open Access Emergency Medicine
- Open Access Journal of Clinical Trials
- Open Access Journal of Contraception
- Open Access Journal of Sports Medicine
- Open Access Insect Physiology^{†}
- Open Access Medical Statistics^{†}
- Open Access Rheumatology: Research and Reviews
- Open Access Surgery
- Orphan Drugs: Research and Reviews^{†}
- Orthopedic Research and Reviews

== P ==
- Pathology and Laboratory Medicine International
- Patient Intelligence^{†}
- Patient Preference and Adherence
- Patient Related Outcome Measures
- Pediatric Health, Medicine and Therapeutics
- Pharmacogenomics and Personalized Medicine
- Pragmatic and Observational Research
- Psoriasis: Targets and Therapy
- Psychology Research and Behavior Management

== R ==
- Reports in Electrochemistry^{†}
- Reports in Medical Imaging
- Reports in Organic Chemistry^{†}
- Reports in Parasitology^{†}
- Reports in Theoretical Chemistry^{†}
- Research Reports in Clinical Cardiology
- Research and Reports in Biochemistry^{†}
- Research and Reports in Biodiversity Studies^{†}
- Research and Reports in Biology ESCI^{†}
- Research and Reports in Chemistry^{†}
- Research and Reports in Endocrine Disorders^{†}
- Research and Reports in Focused Ultrasound^{†}
- Research and Reports in Forensic Medical Science
- Research and Reports in Medicinal Chemistry^{†}
- Research and Reports in Neonatology
- Research and Reports in Nuclear Medicine^{†}
- Research and Reports in Transdermal Drug Delivery^{†}
- Research and Reports in Tropical Medicine
- Research and Reports in Urology
- Research and Reviews in Parkinsonism
- Risk Management and Healthcare Policy
- Robotic Surgery: Research and Reviews

== S ==
- Smart Homecare Technology and TeleHealth
- Stem Cells and Cloning: Advances and Applications
- Substance Abuse and Rehabilitation

== T ==
- Therapeutics and Clinical Risk Management
- Transplant Research and Risk Management

== V ==
- Vaccine: Development and Therapy^{†}
- Vascular Health and Risk Management
- Veterinary Medicine: Research and Reports
- Virus Adaptation and Treatment^{†}
