= List of healthcare journals =

This is a list of academic journals on health care.

== Biomedical Science ==
- American Journal of Biomedical Science and Research

== General ==
- Health Affairs
- Health and Human Rights
- Human Resources for Health
- Health Service Journal
- Journal of Health Management
- Journal of Communication in Healthcare
- Milbank Quarterly

== Epidemiology ==
- American Journal of Epidemiology
- Clinical Epidemiology
- Epidemiology
- European Journal of Epidemiology
- Journal of Clinical Epidemiology
- Journal of Epidemiology and Community Health
- Spatial and Spatio-temporal Epidemiology

== Global health ==
- Bulletin of the World Health Organization
- African Journal of Health Sciences
- Eastern Mediterranean Health Journal
- Global Health Action

== Healthcare economics ==
- Health Economics

== Healthcare ethics ==
- Clinical Ethics
- Patient Preference and Adherence

== Healthcare systems ==
- Health Services Management Research
- Human Resources for Health
- Journal for Healthcare Quality
- Journal of Healthcare Management
- Journal of Innovation in Health Informatics
- Journal of Medical Marketing

== Pharmacy ==
- Core Evidence
- Pharmacotherapy
- The Annals of Pharmacotherapy
- The American Journal of Health-System Pharmacy

== Physical Therapy ==
- British Journal of Occupational Therapy
- Canadian Journal of Occupational Therapy
- Critical Reviews in Physical and Rehabilitation Medicine

== See also ==
- List of medical journals
- Medical literature
