= ADPF 442 =

Ongoing abortion case of the Supreme Court of Brazil

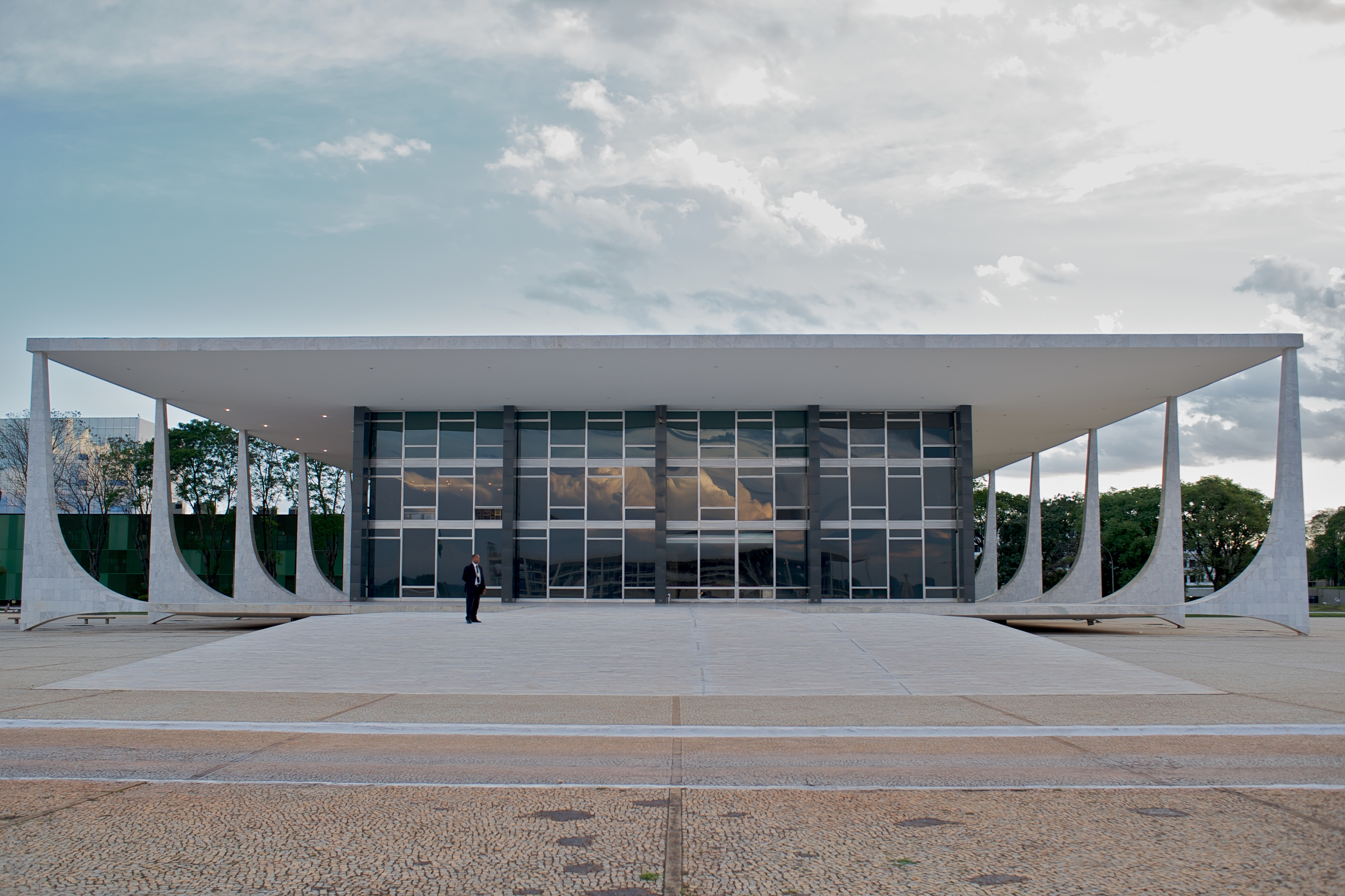
- Court: Supreme Federal Court
- Full case name: Arguição de Descumprimento de Preceito Fundamental 442 (Socialism and Liberty Party (PSOL) v. President of the Republic)
- Started: 8 March 2017

Case history
- Related action: ADPF 54

Court membership
- Judges sitting: President Rosa Weber Justices: Luís Roberto Barroso; Voting is suspended

Case opinions
- Decision by: Weber
- Concurrence: Barroso

Keywords
- Abortion in Brazil; Abortion law

ADPF 442 is an ongoing case of the Supreme Court of Brazil concerning the decriminalization of abortion, in any circumstance, up to 12 weeks of pregnancy. As it stands, the Brazilian Penal Code prohibits abortion except in cases of rape and risk to the mother's life, and in the case of anencephalic fetuses (see ADPF 54). (Note: The following explicit mentions to voluntary abortion on the Decreto-Lei Nº 2.848 of 7 December 1940 (a.k.a. Penal Code of Brazil) outline its current legality in Brazil: Art. 124: causing abortion in oneself, or consenting to someone else causing it: 1 to 3 years in prison (detention); Art. 126: causing abortion with the consent of the pregnant person: 1 to 4 years in prison (reclusion, see Reclusão); Art. 128: abortion practiced by a doctor is not punishable: I) If there is no other way to save the life of the pregnant person; II) If the pregnancy is a result of rape and the abortion follows consent of the pregnant person or, when incapable, her legal representative; See also: Abortion in Brazil.)

A positive result in this case would bring Brazilian legislation closer to some of its Latin American neighbors, such as Argentina, Colombia, Cuba, Guyana, Mexico and Uruguay.

== Background ==
Legality of abortion by country or territory Legal on request: No gestational limit; Gestational limit after the first 17 weeks; Gestational limit in the first 17 weeks; Unclear gestational limit; Legally restricted to cases of: Risk to woman's life, to her health*, rape*, fetal impairment*, or socioeconomic factors; Risk to woman's life, to her health*, rape, or fetal impairment; Risk to woman's life, to her health*, or fetal impairment; Risk to woman's life*, to her health*, or rape; Risk to woman's life or to her health; Risk to woman's life; Illegal with no exceptions; No information; * Does not apply to some countries or territories in that category Note: In some countries or territories, abortion laws are modified by other laws, regulations, legal principles or judicial decisions. This map shows their combined effect as implemented by the authorities.

The case was brought before the Supreme Court by the Socialism and Liberty Party (PSOL) in March 2017, arguing that the current criminalization of abortion is unconstitutional. The party argues that the Constitution, from 1988, invalidaded what had been in the Penal Code since 1940 regarding abortion: when criminalizing it, the Penal Code can be seen to be effectively imposing a compulsory pregnancy, which would violate a few of the constitutionally protected rights. For example:

- Art. 1st (III): the fundamental right to dignity;
- Art. 1st (II): the fundamental right to citizenship;
- Art. 3rd (IV), Art. 5th: the right to gender equality and non-discrimination;
- Art. 6th, Art. 196: the right to freedom, to health, to physical and psychological integrity;
- Art. 226 (§7th): the right to family planning, safe from intervention by public or private entities.

The party also argues that the criminalization disproportionally affects black, poor and indigenous women who, by consequence of their financial situation and Brazil's racial animosity climate, have less access to safe abortions; as opposed to white and otherwise higher class women, who may have the opportunity to, among other solutions, travel to countries where abortion is legal. (Note: See also: Social apartheid in Brazil.)

PSOL requests that the Supreme Court invalidate prisons and lawsuits related to voluntary abortions in the first 12 weeks of pregnancy; recognize the constitutional right of women to decide on the interruption of their own pregnancy; and guarantee legal protection to health professionals that perform the procedure.

== Votes ==
=== Rosa Weber ===
Former Supreme Court minister Rosa Weber was due for mandatory retirement on 2 October 2023. As president, Weber brought the case for deliberation and, as rapporteur, cast the initial, 129-page vote on 22 September 2023 during a virtual session. (Note: Minister Rosa Weber's 129-page vote is available, in full, here.) Voting on the case was then suspended due to a request by minister Luís Roberto Barroso for an in-person vote. Weber voted in favor of the decriminalization of abortion up to 12 weeks.

Weber went on to retire on 30 September 2023, leaving the presidency of the court to minister Barroso. Flávio Dino, Weber's successor to the court set to take office on 22 February 2024, will likely not be able to recast a vote in this case.

=== Luís Roberto Barroso ===
On 9 October 2025, minister Barroso announced his early retirement, due for 18 October. Barroso then rescinded his 2023 request for an in-person vote, which allowed for the case to be voted on remotely; and, on his last workday (the friday of 17 October), the minister concurred with Weber's decision, stating the following:

A discussão real não está em ser contra ou a favor do aborto. É definir se a mulher que passa por esse infortúnio deve ser presa. Vale dizer: se o Estado deve ter o poder de mandar a polícia, o Ministério Público ou o juiz obrigar uma mulher a ter o filho que ela não quer ou não pode ter, por motivos que só ela deve decidir. E, se ela não concordar, mandá-la para o sistema prisional.
The true discussion isn't whether one is for or against abortion. It's to decide whether the woman who goes through this misfortune should be arrested. It's worth laying it out: if the State should have the power to send the police, the Prosecutor's Office or the judge to force a woman to have a child that she does not want to or cannot have, for reasons that only her can decide. And, if she disagrees, to send her to prison.

Barroso additionally highlighted that criminalization penalizes, above all, women and girls of lower classes, as opposed to those in the middle and upper classes, who have the opportunity to travel to Uruguay, Colombia or Europe for a legal abortion. Barroso went on to empathize with the religious argument, but justified his position by contrasting the Golden Rule with the violence of incarcerating women for this decision.

Following Barroso's vote, minister Gilmar Mendes requested an in-person vote, suspending voting on the case once again.

=== Future votes ===
Voting on the case is suspended, and it is up to the president of the Supreme Court to decide if and when it will be voted upon. However, both ministers Nunes Marques and André Mendonça have openly positioned themselves against decriminalization, believing the country's current exceptions – rape, life of the mother and anencephalic fetuses – to be sufficient.

== High Court decision ==
=== Judiciary representation ===
Supreme Court members	Ministers	Yes	No
Rosa Weber	1	1	
Luís Roberto Barroso	1	1	
Total	02	02	00

== See also ==
- Abortion law
- Abortion in Brazil
- ADPF 54 (decriminalization of abortions involving anencephalic fetuses)
