= ADPF 54 =

Landmark abortion case of the Supreme Court of Brazil

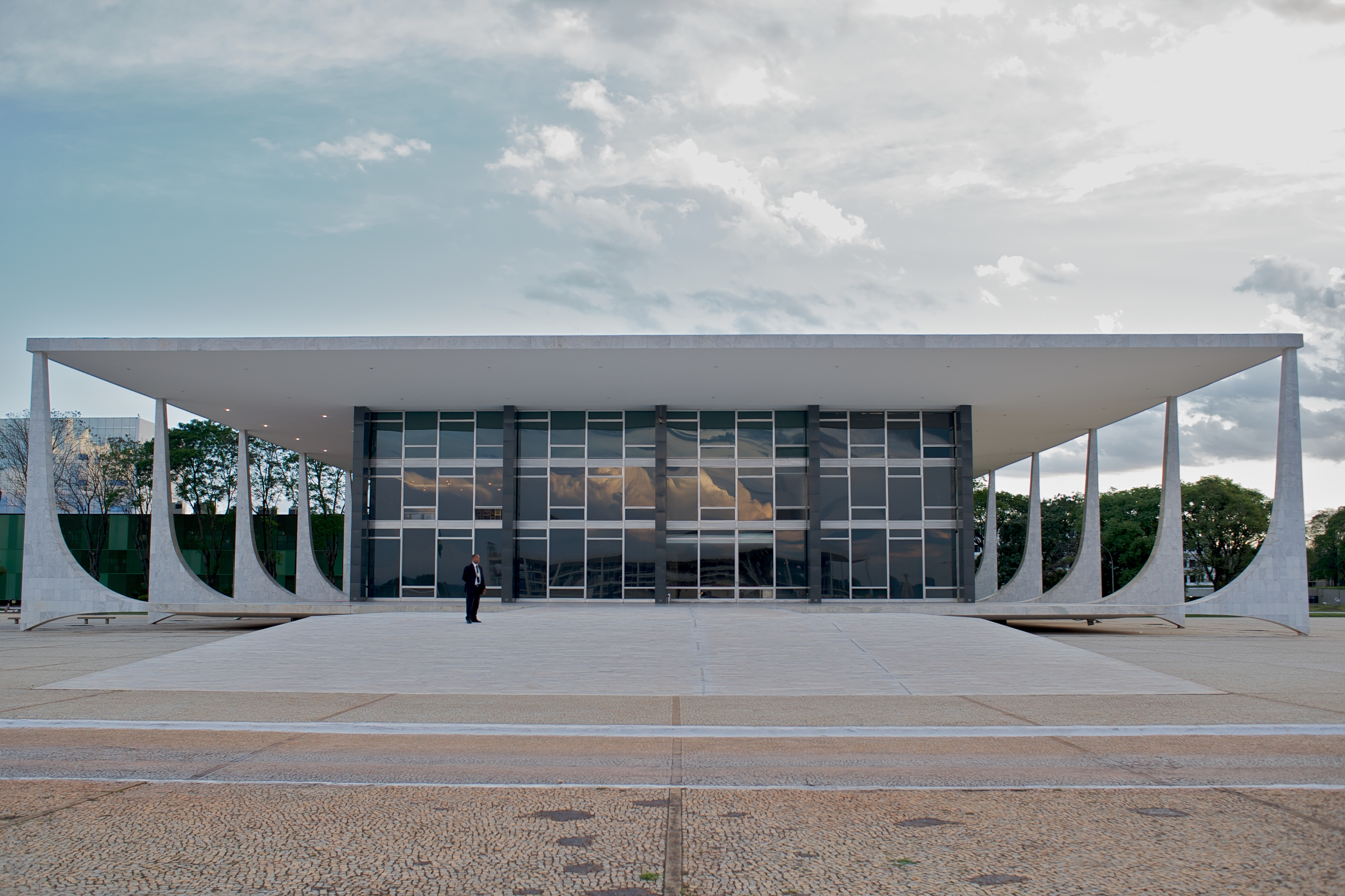
- Court: Supreme Federal Court
- Full case name: Arguição de Descumprimento de Preceito Fundamental 54 (National Confederation of Health Workers (CNTS) v. President of the Republic)
- Started: 17 June 2004
- Decided: 12 April 2012
- Citation: Supreme Court of Brazil decriminalized the abortion of anencephalics in the country

Court membership
- Judges sitting: President Cezar Peluso Justices: Marco Aurélio Mello; Ayres Britto; Cármen Lúcia; Ricardo Lewandowski; Gilmar Mendes; Joaquim Barbosa; Celso de Mello; Luiz Fux; Rosa Weber

Case opinions
- Decision by: Aurélio
- Concurrence: Britto, Lúcia, Mendes, Barbosa, Mello, Fux and Weber
- Dissent: Peluzo and Lewandowski

Keywords
- Abortion in Brazil; Abortion law

ADPF 54 is a landmark case of the Supreme Court of Brazil. The rapporteur, minister Marco Aurélio Mello, voted in favor of decriminalization of abortions involving anencephalic fetuses. The minister considered it unconstitutional the interpretation that interrupting a pregnancy of anencephalic fetus is a crime according to the Penal Code of Brazil:

Aborto é crime contra a vida. Tutela-se a vida em potencial. No caso do anencéfalo, não existe vida possível. O feto anencéfalo é biologicamente vivo, por ser formado por células vivas, e juridicamente morto, não gozando de proteção estatal. [...] O anencéfalo jamais se tornará uma pessoa. Em síntese, não se cuida de vida em potencial, mas de morte segura. Anencefalia é incompatível com a vida.

Abortion is a crime against life. The potential life is protected. In the case of the anencephalic, there is no possible life. The anencephalic fetus is biologically alive, being composed of living cells, and juridically dead, not warranting state protection. [...] The anencephalic will never become a person. In short, it is not about caring for a potential life, but an assured death. Anencephaly is incompatible with life.

— Excerpt of Minister Marco Aurélio's vote

Minister Dias Toffoli voluntarily abstained from voting due to a self-declared conflict of interest, as he previously presented a favorable opinion towards interrupting the pregnancy in such cases, during his term as Attorney General of Brazil.

== High Court decision ==
Legality of abortion by country or territory Legal on request: No gestational limit; Gestational limit after the first 17 weeks; Gestational limit in the first 17 weeks; Unclear gestational limit; Legally restricted to cases of: Risk to woman's life, to her health*, rape*, fetal impairment*, or socioeconomic factors; Risk to woman's life, to her health*, rape, or fetal impairment; Risk to woman's life, to her health*, or fetal impairment; Risk to woman's life*, to her health*, or rape; Risk to woman's life or to her health; Risk to woman's life; Illegal with no exceptions; No information; * Does not apply to some countries or territories in that category Note: In some countries or territories, abortion laws are modified by other laws, regulations, legal principles or judicial decisions. This map shows their combined effect as implemented by the authorities.

=== Judiciary representation ===
Supreme Court members	Ministers	Yes	No
Ayres Britto	1	1	
Cármen Lúcia	1	1	
Celso de Mello	1	1	
Cezar Peluso	1		1
Gilmar Mendes	1	1	
Marco Aurélio Mello	1	1	
Rosa Weber	1	1	
Joaquim Barbosa	1	1	
Luiz Fux	1	1	
Ricardo Lewandowski	1		1
Total	10	08	02

=== Legislative representation ===
Prosecutor General	Prosecutor	Yes	No
Roberto Gurgel	1	1	
Total	1	1	0

=== Executive representation ===
Attorney General	Attorney	Yes	No
Luís Inácio Adams	1	1	
Total	1	1	0

=== Amici curiae ===
Page in the Supreme Federal Court's ruling listing the amici curiae involved in the decision

Amici curiae (Support for ADPF 54) (10)
Entity	Translated name	Acronym
Católicas pelo Direito de Decidir	Catholics for the Right to Decide	CDD
Associação de Desenvolvimento da Família	Association of Family Development	ADEF
Federação Brasileira de Ginecologia e Obstetrícia	Brazilian Federation of Gynecology	FEBRASGO
Sociedade Brasileira de Genética Clínica	Brazilian Society of Clinical Genetics	
Sociedade Brasileira de Medicina Fetal	Brazilian Clinical Society of Fetal Medicine	
Conselho Federal de Medicina	Federal Council of Medicine	CFM
Rede Feminista de Saúde	Feminist Network of Health	
Escola de Gente	School of People	EG
Instituto de Bioética, Direitos Humanos e Gênero	Institute of Bioethics, Human Rights and Gender	ANIS
Federal Deputy José Aristodemo Pinotti (DEM-SP)	—	—

Amici curiae (Against ADPF 54) (3)
Entity	Translated name	Acronym
Conferência Nacional dos Bispos do Brasil	National Conference of Brazilian Bishops	CNBB
Associação Nacional Pró-vida e Pró-família	National Association Pro-Life and Pro-Family	
Igreja Universal do Reino de Deus	Universal Church of the Kingdom of God	IURD

== See also ==
- ADPF 442 (ongoing case concerning decriminalization of abortions up to 12 weeks of pregnancy)
- Abortion law
- Abortion in Brazil
