= Yvonne Thomas (occupational therapist) =

Professor of occupational therapy in New Zealand

Academic background
- Education: James Cook University, James Cook University, University of Otago
- Thesis: An occupational perspective of wellbeing: a case study of homelessness in Townsville (2012)

Yvonne Thomas is an English-New Zealand occupation therapist and academic, and is a full professor at Otago Polytechnic, specialising in occupational health, wellbeing and homelessness.

== Academic career ==
Thomas is English, and trained as an occupational therapist, graduating from St Loyes School of Occupational Therapy (now part of the University of Plymouth) in 1983. Thomas then worked as an occupational therapist, gaining experience in social care, rehabilitation of stroke patients, and mental health. Thomas moved first to New Zealand, where she gained a postgraduate certificate in clinical teaching from the University of Canterbury, and a graduate diploma in education from the University of Otago. Thomas then moved to Queensland, where she earned a Masters of Education, and completed a PhD titled An occupational perspective of wellbeing: a case study of homelessness in Townsville at James Cook University in 2012. Thomas has worked at the University of Worcester, where she developed and led an occupational therapy programme. Thomas then joined the faculty Otago Polytechnic, rising to full professor in 2022. Her research focuses on how occupations can affect wellbeing, especially for marginalised and socially disadvantaged people. As part of this, she is interested in the concept of home and how homeless people maintain wellbeing. Thomas also investigates professional practice and practice education for health professionals, and has reviewed the use and role of simulation in the education of health professionals.

Thomas is the research coordinator for the Otago Polytechnic.

== Selected works ==
- Kristy Alexandratos; Barnett, Fiona; Thomas, Yvonne (2012). "The Impact of Exercise on the Mental Health and Quality of Life of People with Severe Mental Illness: A Critical Review". British Journal of Occupational Therapy. 75 (2): 48–60. doi:10.4276/030802212x13286281650956. Wikidata Q61912300.
- Thomas, Yvonne; David Dickson; Jacqueline Broadbridge; Linda Hopper; Rachel Hawkins; Ann Edwards; Cathy McBryde (2007). "Benefits and challenges of supervising occupational therapy fieldwork students: Supervisors' perspectives". Australian Occupational Therapy Journal. 54 (s1). doi:10.1111/j.1440-1630.2007.00694.x. Wikidata Q124407960.
- Thomas, Yvonne; Marion Gray; Sue McGinty; Sally Ebringer (2011). "Homeless adults engagement in art: first steps towards identity, recovery and social inclusion". Australian Occupational Therapy Journal. 58 (6): 429–436. doi:10.1111/j.1440-1630.2011.00977.x. PMID 22111645. Wikidata Q39521782.
- Thomas, Yvonne; Marion Gray; Sue McGinty (2010). "A systematic review of occupational therapy interventions with homeless people". Occupational Therapy in Health Care. 25 (1): 38–53. doi:10.3109/07380577.2010.528554. PMID 23898982. Wikidata Q38125227.
- Thomas, Yvonne; Merrolee Penman; Peter Williamson (2005). "Australian and New Zealand fieldwork: Charting the territory for future practice". Australian Occupational Therapy Journal. 52 (1): 78–81. doi:10.1111/j.1440-1630.2004.00452.x. Wikidata Q124407964.
- Thomas, Yvonne; Marion A Gray; Sue McGinty (2012). "An exploration of subjective wellbeing among people experiencing homelessness: a strengths-based approach". Social Work in Health Care. 51 (9): 780–797. doi:10.1080/00981389.2012.686475. PMID 23078011. Wikidata Q39521772.
