= Respiratory Care Clinics of North America =

North American healthcare journal

Respiratory Care Clinics of North America (Respir. Care Clin. N. Am.) was a peer-reviewed healthcare journal published from 1995 to 2006 by Elsevier. It was indexed by PubMed/MEDLINE/Index Medicus.
