= Quality Assurance Journal =

- Discipline: Health sciences
- Language: English
- Edited by: Rita Hattemer-Apostel, Anthony B. Jones

Publication details
- History: 1997-2011
- Publisher: John Wiley & Sons
- Frequency: Quarterly

Standard abbreviations
- ISO 4: Qual. Assur. J.

Indexing
- CODEN: QAJOFW
- ISSN: 1087-8378 (print); 1099-1786 (web)
- LCCN: 97658600
- OCLC no.: 488616651

Links
- Journal homepage; Online archive

The Quality Assurance Journal was a quarterly peer-reviewed healthcare journal published by John Wiley & Sons. It covered quality assurance issues relating to the healthcare and environmental industries. It was established in 1997 and ceased publication at the end of 2011. The founding editor-in-chief was David Long and the last editors were Rita Hattemer-Apostel and Anthony B. Jones.

== Abstracting and indexing ==
The journal is abstracted and indexed in ProQuest databases, EMBASE, EMBASE, and Scopus.
