= ClinicoEconomics and Outcomes Research =

- Discipline: Health policy
- Language: English

Publication details
- History: 2009-present
- Publisher: Dove Medical Press
- Frequency: Upon acceptance

Standard abbreviations
- ISO 4: Clin. Outcomes Res.
- NLM: Clinicoecon Outcomes Res

Indexing
- ISSN: 1178-6981
- OCLC no.: 423069221

Links
- Journal homepage

ClinicoEconomics and Outcomes Research is a peer-reviewed healthcare journal focusing on covering the economic impact of health policy and health systems organization. The journal was established in 2009 and is published by Dove Medical Press.
