= Drug, Healthcare and Patient Safety =

- Discipline: Patient safety
- Language: English
- Edited by: Shufeng Zhou

Publication details
- History: 2009-present
- Publisher: Dove Medical Press
- Frequency: Upon acceptance
- Open access: Yes

Standard abbreviations
- ISO 4: Drug Healthc. Patient Saf.

Indexing
- ISSN: 1179-1365
- OCLC no.: 335214841

Links
- Journal homepage

The Drug, Healthcare and Patient Safety is a peer-reviewed healthcare journal covering patient safety issues. It was established in 2009 and is published by Dove Medical Press. The journal is abstracted and indexed in EMBASE and Scopus.
