= Leucine-rich repeats and IQ motif containing 1 =

Protein-coding gene in the species Homo sapiens

LRRIQ1

Identifiers
- Aliases: LRRIQ1, leucine rich repeats and IQ motif containing 1
- External IDs: MGI: 1922228; GeneCards: LRRIQ1

Gene location (Human)
Chr.	Chromosome 12 (human)
Band	12q21.31	Start	85,036,314 bp
Band	12q21.31	End	85,264,457 bp

Gene location (Mouse)
Chr.	Chromosome 10 (mouse)
Band	10|10 D1	Start	102,881,892 bp
Band	10|10 D1	End	103,072,183 bp
RNA expression pattern
Bgee	Human / Mouse (ortholog); Top expressed in: right uterine tube; olfactory zone of nasal mucosa; testicle; gonad; left testis; right testis; bronchial epithelial cell; ventricular zone; ganglionic eminence; anterior pituitary / Top expressed in: spermatid; spermatocyte; testicle; zygote; secondary oocyte; primary oocyte; embryo; embryo; lung; hypothalamus; More reference expression data
BioGPS	n/a
Orthologs
Databases	NCBI: entry; OMA: entry
Species	Human	Mouse
Entrez	84125	74978
Ensembl	ENSG00000133640	ENSMUSG00000019892
UniProt	Q96JM4	Q0P5X1
RefSeq (mRNA)	NM_001079910; NM_032165	NM_001163559; NM_029134; NM_001361058
RefSeq (protein)	NP_001073379	NP_001157031; NP_083410; NP_001347987
Location (UCSC)	Chr 12: 85.04 – 85.26 Mb	Chr 10: 102.88 – 103.07 Mb
PubMed search
- Wikidata
View/Edit Human	View/Edit Mouse

Using the leucine-rich repeat Query sequence of the LRRIQ1 protein, the Phyre2 program was utilized to make a figure outlining the predicted secondary structure based on its similarity to template leucine rich motifs.

Leucine-rich repeats and IQ motif containing 1 is a protein that in humans is encoded by the LRRIQ1 gene. The protein is likely a nuclear encoding mitochondrial protein and is found in all Metazoans.

== Gene ==
LRRIQ1 is mapped on chromosome 12, at 12q21.31 inhumans. LRRIQ1 is near ALX1 on the positive strand, and TSPAN19 and SLC6115 on the negative strand. It covers 208.78kb, from 85430099 to 8563881 on the direct strand. The gene contains 36 exons.

== mRNA ==
The gene contains 31 distinct introns, and the transcript produces 10 different mRNAs. LRRIQ1 has two validated alternative polyadenylation sites. The most common isoform consists of 5,460 base pairs in length, and includes 28 of the total 29 exons. Primates have an elongated 3’ end compared to other mammalian species. Reptiles, birds, and fish also have a truncated 3’end, compared to primate transcripts.

== Protein ==
The protein is a nuclear encoding mitochondrial protein. The protein in humans has 1760 amino acids. The protein is considered largely neutral, though 17% of the primary structure is composed of the hydrophobic leucine-rich repeats.

The leucine-rich repeat forms a structural horseshoe shape, which encourages protein-protein interactions. The most common translated isoform has a predicted molecular weight of 199.3 kdal. Compared to an average of human sequences, the internal composition is rich in Leucine, Glutamic Acid, and Lysine.

== Domains and motifs ==
LRRIQ1 contains an IQ calmodulin-binding motif found in one isoform. The isoform contains three copies and serves as a binding site for Calmodulin or CaM-like proteins. The Leucine-Rich Repeat domain is found in three isoforms of LRRIQ1. LRRIQ1 contains 4 Leucine Rich Repeats (LRR). The LRR motif provides a structural frame work for the formation of protein-protein interactions, forming a coiled horseshoe shape.

== Homology ==
There are no known paralogs of LRRIQ1 detected in humans.

There are many orthologs of LRRIQ1. Orthologous LRRIQ1 is found in all metazoans. LRRIQ1 is not found in Plants, Bacteria, Archaea, Fungi, or protists. The most distant homolog is found in Drosophila melanogaster (estimated time of divergence 847 million years ago). The IQ-containing motif and Leucine-rich repeats domains are conserved in Drosophila.

== Conservation ==
The LRRIQ1 gene has been shown to be highly conserved. The gene has true orthologs throughout the taxa mammal and is found in all Metazoans. The time of divergence versus the corrected % divergence (m) was plotted with samples from human, gorilla, domesticate cat, bison, orca whale, Arabian camel, domestic horse, African Bush Elephant, Bald Eagle, Adelie Penguin, Japanese Gecko, Carolina Anole, and Western Clawed Frog. To make slopes for Fibrinogen (considered a comparatively rapidly evolving protein) and Cytochrome C (comparatively slower), Xenopus tropical, Xenopus laevis, Takifugu rubripes, and Bos Taurus were utilized for comparison.

== Expression ==
LRRIQ1 is lowly expressed (0.6 times the average gene) in lung, testis, epithelial tissue, pooled germ cell tumors, brain tissues, embryonic tissues, and adipose tissues.

== Interacting proteins ==
The presence of the Leucine-Rich Repeat motif provides structural framework for protein-protein interactions. HES4 is the only identified protein that interacts with LRRIQ1.

HES4 is a transcription factor found in humans. The protein binds DNA on N-box motifs.

== Clinical significance ==
To date, the clinical significance of this gene is not known.
