= Trisha Greenhalgh =

British doctor and professor

Professor Trisha Greenhalgh OBE FRCP FRCGP FMedSci
- Born: 11 March 1959 (age 67)

Academic background
- Education: University of Cambridge; University of Oxford

Academic work
- Discipline: Primary health care
- Notable works: How to Read a Paper (1997); The Complete Guide to Breast Cancer (2018)

Patricia Mary Greenhalgh (born 11 March 1959) is a British professor of primary health care at the University of Oxford, and retired general practitioner.

== Early life and education ==
Trisha Greenhalgh was born on 11 March 1959. She attended Folkestone Grammar School. She gained a BA in Social and Political Sciences from the University of Cambridge in 1980, and three years later graduated in medicine from the University of Oxford.

== Academic career ==
In April 2010, Greenhalgh was appointed Professor of Primary Health Care and Dean for Research Impact at Queen Mary University of London. Her role included setting up and leading the Healthcare Innovation and Policy Unit in the Centre for Health Sciences at Barts and the London School of Medicine and Dentistry.

In January 2015, Trish Greenhalgh took up the post of Professor of Primary Care Health Sciences and Fellow of Green Templeton College at the University of Oxford.

In September 2016, she was one of 14 scientists, doctors, and policymakers who signed onto an open letter to Prime Minister UK Theresa May calling for an inquiry into Secretary of State for Health Jeremy Hunt's claim that inadequate weekend staffing at the National Health Service led to avoidable patient deaths.

She is a Senior Investigator at the National Institute for Health and Care Research (NIHR).

She is the author/co-author of more than 580 peer-reviewed publications and 8 textbooks.

How to Read a Paper, her widely-read book on how to assess medical research papers first appeared in 1997. The sixth edition was published in 2019.

With Liz O'Riordan, she co-authored The Complete Guide to Breast Cancer, published by Vermilionin in 2018.

== Honours and awards ==
She has twice won the Royal College of General Practitioners Research Paper of the Year Award.

She accepted an OBE in 2001 for services to evidence based medical care.

In 2006, she was one of the authors who received the Baxter Award from the European Health Management Association.

She was elected to become a Fellow of the Academy of Medical Sciences in 2014.

== Selected publications ==
=== Books ===
- How to Read a Paper: The Basics of Evidence-Based Medicine. John Wiley & Sons. 2014. ISBN 978-1-118-80096-6.

=== Articles ===
- Greenhalgh, Trisha; Robert, Glenn; MacFarlane, Fraser; Bate, Paul; Kyriakidou, Olivia (December 2004). "Diffusion of Innovations in Service Organizations: Systematic Review and Recommendations". The Milbank Quarterly. 82 (4): 581–629. doi:10.1111/j.0887-378X.2004.00325.x. ISSN 0887-378X. PMC 2690184. PMID 15595944. (Co-author)
