= Core Evidence =

Academic pharmacology journal

- Discipline: Drug development
- Language: English
- Edited by: Gulshan Sharma

Publication details
- History: 2005–present
- Publisher: Dove Medical Press
- Frequency: Upon acceptance
- Open access: Yes

Standard abbreviations
- ISO 4: Core Evid.

Indexing
- ISSN: 1555-1741 (print); 1555-175X (web)
- OCLC no.: 58523471

Links
- Journal homepage

Core Evidence is a peer-reviewed healthcare journal covering research on drug development. The journal was established in 2005 and is published by Dove Medical Press, since 2017 part of Taylor & Francis.
