= International Journal of Nephrology and Renovascular Disease =

- Discipline: Nephrology, renovascular hypertension
- Language: English
- Edited by: Pravin C. Singhal

Publication details
- History: 2008-present
- Publisher: Dove Medical Press
- Frequency: Upon acceptance
- Open access: Yes

Standard abbreviations
- ISO 4: Int. J. Nephrol. Renov. Dis.

Indexing
- ISSN: 1178-7058
- OCLC no.: 319595337

Links
- Journal homepage

The International Journal of Nephrology and Renovascular Disease is an open-access peer-reviewed medical journal focusing on kidney and vascular supply studies. It was established in 2008 and is published by Dove Medical Press. It is abstracted and indexed in PubMed, EMBASE, and Scopus.
