= Occupational Therapy in Health Care =

- Discipline: Occupational therapy
- Language: English
- Edited by: Anne E. Dickerson

Publication details
- History: 1984–present
- Publisher: Informa
- Frequency: Quarterly

Standard abbreviations
- ISO 4: Occup. Ther. Health Care

Indexing
- CODEN: OTHCES
- ISSN: 0738-0577 (print); 1541-3098 (web)
- LCCN: sf93093836
- OCLC no.: 09500767

Links
- Journal homepage; Online access; Online archive

Occupational Therapy in Health Care is a peer-reviewed healthcare journal covering occupational therapy. It is published by Informa and is edited by Anne E. Dickerson (East Carolina University).

Occupational Therapy in Health Care was established in 1984 and is published 4 times a year.
