= The Complete Guide to Breast Cancer =

2018 book by Trisha Greenhalgh

- Author: Trisha Greenhalgh, Liz O'Riordan
- Language: English
- Subject: Breast cancer
- Published: 2018
- Publisher: Vermilion
- Pages: 295
- ISBN: 9781785041877

The Complete Guide to Breast Cancer is a self-help book, published by Vermilion (imprint of Penguin Random House) in 2018, and written by Trisha Greenhalgh, professor of primary health care and retired general practitioner, and Liz O'Riordan, a retired breast surgeon. The book uses their own experiences of having breast cancer and British evidence-based guidelines to educate the reader on its diagnosis, treatment and recovery period.
