= Diabetes, Metabolic Syndrome and Obesity: Targets and Therapy =

- Discipline: Diabetes, metabolism, obesity
- Language: English
- Edited by: Ming Zou

Publication details
- History: 2008-present
- Publisher: Dove Medical Press
- Frequency: Upon acceptance
- Open access: Yes

Standard abbreviations
- ISO 4: Diabetes Metab. Syndr. Obes.: Targets Ther.

Indexing
- ISSN: 1178-7007
- OCLC no.: 319859133

Links
- Journal homepage

Diabetes, Metabolic Syndrome and Obesity: Targets and Therapy is a peer-reviewed medical journal covering research on diabetes, metabolic syndromes, and obesity. The journal was established in 2008 and is published by Dove Medical Press.
