= Cancer Management and Research =

- Discipline: Oncology
- Language: English
- Edited by: Kenan Onel

Publication details
- History: 2009-present
- Publisher: Dove Medical Press
- Frequency: Upon acceptance
- Open access: Yes
- Impact factor: 2.886 (2019)

Standard abbreviations
- ISO 4: Cancer Manag. Res.

Indexing
- CODEN: CMRACP
- ISSN: 1179-1322
- OCLC no.: 422989826

Links
- Journal homepage

Cancer Management and Research is a peer-reviewed medical journal covering research on cancer. It is published by Dove Medical Press.
