= Journal of Asthma and Allergy =

- Discipline: Asthma
- Language: English
- Edited by: Amrita Dosanjh

Publication details
- History: 2008-present
- Publisher: Dove Medical Press
- Frequency: Upon acceptance
- Open access: Yes

Standard abbreviations
- ISO 4: J. Asthma Allergy

Indexing
- ISSN: 1178-6965
- OCLC no.: 664580770

Links
- Journal homepage

The Journal of Asthma and Allergy is a peer-reviewed medical journal focusing on asthma and pulmonary physiology. The journal was established in 2008 and is published by Dove Medical Press.
