= Vascular Health and Risk Management =

- Discipline: Cardiovascular diseases
- Language: English
- Edited by: Roland Asmar

Publication details
- History: 2007-present
- Publisher: Dove Medical Press
- Frequency: Upon acceptance
- Open access: Yes

Standard abbreviations
- ISO 4: Vasc. Health Risk Manag.

Indexing
- ISSN: 1178-2048
- OCLC no.: 228278572

Links
- Journal homepage

Vascular Health and Risk Management is a peer-reviewed medical journal covering research in cardiology. It is published by Dove Medical Press.
