= Integrated Blood Pressure Control =

- Discipline: Blood pressure
- Language: English
- Edited by: Steven Atlas

Publication details
- History: 2008-present
- Publisher: Dove Medical Press
- Frequency: Upon acceptance
- Open access: Yes

Standard abbreviations
- ISO 4: Integr. Blood Press. Control

Indexing
- ISSN: 1178-7104
- OCLC no.: 335214842

Links
- Journal homepage

Integrated Blood Pressure Control is a peer-reviewed medical journal covering research on hypertension using integrated treatments and strategies. The journal was established in 2008 and is published by Dove Medical Press. The editor-in-chief is Steven Atlas (Mount Sinai School of Medicine).

== Abstracting and indexing ==
The journal is abstracted and indexed in PubMed, Chemical Abstracts Service, EMBASE, and Scopus.
