= Abortion in Brazil =

Legal status of abortion in Brazil

Abortion in Brazil in permitted by law in three situations: (1) to save the woman's life, (2) when the pregnancy is the result of rape, and (3), if the fetus is anencephalic. In cases that fall under these three situations, abortion is guaranteed and performed free of charge by the Unified Health System (SUS). Cases that do not fall under these are considered a crime, with penalties range from one to three years of imprisonment for the recipient of the abortion, and one to four years of imprisonment for the doctor or any other person(s) who performs the abortion on someone else.

The debate on abortion is highly polarized. The pro-choice side argues that decriminalizing abortion on all fronts is a matter of public health and women's rights, as the latter considers the autonomy women have over their bodies. On the pro-life side, they argue that decriminalizing abortion is an affront to human life. There is also opposition from various religious groups with political influence on politicians, officials and ministers. The current law has resulted in women seeking clandestine methods to perform abortion, further risking them. The Economist wrote in 2026 that there is little prospect for legalizing abortion, as politicians consider the topic "radioactive" and a declining public support for decriminalization. In 2024, a bill that would punish abortions performed after 22 weeks up to 20 years in prison was being rushed in the Congress before protesters stalled it.

The punishment for a woman who performs an abortion on herself or consents to an abortion performed by another outside these legal exceptions is one to three years of detention. The base penalty for a third party that performs an illegal abortion with the consent of the patient, ranges from one to four years of detention, with the possibility of increase by a third if the woman comes to any physical harm, and can be doubled if she dies. Criminal penalties fixed at four years or less can be converted to non-incarceration punishments, such as community service and compulsory donation to charity.

Brazil is a signatory of the American Human Rights Convention, also called the Pact of San José. The Convention grants the right to life to human embryos, "in general, from the moment of conception", and has a legal status on a par with the Constitution in Brazilian Law. The Civil Code of Brazil also provides rights to fetuses and embryos. In a 2008 case, however, the Supreme Federal Court ruled, by a 6–5 vote, that the right to life applies only to intrauterine embryos, and that frozen embryos not eligible to a uterus transfer do not hold fundamental rights and may be used for research purposes. In 2012, the Supreme Court also authorized the abortion of anencephalic fetuses.

On November 29, 2016, the Supreme Court in Brazil ruled in a non-binding decision that "abortion should not be a crime when performed in the first three months of pregnancy". This ruling was controversial because the Brazilian government had passed a bill earlier in 2016 which aimed to make Brazilian law on abortion even stricter. As of September 2023, the Court is considering a case that could decriminalise abortion up to twelve weeks; in one of her final statements before retiring as the Court's president, Rosa Weber, made a public statement stating that motherhood should be a choice and not an obligation.

As of October 2025, an abortion can be performed in Brazil only if the pregnancy is a case of rape, is life-threatening to the pregnant woman, or if the baby is anencephalic. The above-mentioned case of decriminalising abortion up to twelve weeks has not been enacted as a date for a vote in the Congress's Chamber of Deputies has not been set yet.

== History ==
Abortion was criminalized in all circumstances in the penal code from 1890. In 1940, the penal code provisions on abortion waived punishment on abortion in the case of rape or incest, or if the pregnant women's life was in danger. A presidential decree in 1941, as amended in 1979, banned the advertising of a process, substance, or object designed to prevent pregnancy or cause an abortion.

== Statistics ==
The number of clandestine abortions taking place in Brazil is a controversial subject which divides anti-abortion and abortion rights activists. A study published by the International Journal of Women's Health in 2014, estimated that in Brazil about 48 thousand clandestine abortions occurs annually. Abortion rights institutes like Anis - Bioethics Institute, however, estimate a much higher number. More recent studies published in the International Journal of Gynaecology and Obstetrics suggest that, despite Brazil's severe legislation, 500,000 illegal abortions are estimated to occur every year among women aged 18–39 years – or one in five Brazilian women.

== Impact to women's health ==
In 2010, it was reported that 200,000 women a year were hospitalized for complications due to abortion (which includes both miscarriages and clandestine abortions). More recent figures estimate that around 250,000 women are hospitalized every year due to illegal abortion complications, or 50% of all illegal abortions estimated per year. Those figures contrast with 2–5% of women requiring medical care after an abortion in countries where abortion is legal. The majority of women admitted at hospital after an illegal abortion are uninsured, representing a government cost of more than US$10 million every year. More than 200 women die every year in Brazil, as a direct consequence of unsafe abortions. The prevalence of reproductive complications and other negative health consequences associated with illegal abortion is unknown.

== Methods ==
In a 2005 survey, one third of the Brazilian doctors who reported having performed abortions, used dilation and curettage. They have little experience with vacuum aspiration but they are aware of it as a method. They have a general awareness of medical abortion using misoprostol (Cytotec) or other prostaglandins to induce abortion but less experience with it. Few know of newer and more effective regimens using mifepristone or methotrexate.

The 2005 survey also found considerable ignorance of Brazil's law on abortion, with only 48% of the physicians knowing that it is legal to save a woman's life and widespread confusion about fetal age limits. An earlier survey found that two-thirds of Brazilian OB-GYNs incorrectly believed that a judicial order is required to obtain a legal abortion and only 27% knew that the woman needed to make a written request to obtain a legal abortion. Those doctors cannot give accurate information to their patients.

In non-hospital settings, women's folk medicine allegedly brings on the menstrual flow rather than causing an abortion. "Two folk medical conditions, "delayed" (atrasada) and "suspended" (suspendida) menstruation, are described as perceived by poor Brazilian women in Northeast Brazil. Culturally prescribed methods to "regulate" these conditions and induce menstrual bleeding are also described, including ingesting herbal remedies, patent drugs, and modern pharmaceuticals."

Some women, if financially able, will travel abroad to have abortions, with Cuba, Mexico, Guyana, Aruba, Curaçao, French Guiana, and the United States being some of the countries women travel to.

== Politics ==
The modern abortion debate can be traced back to feminist movements of the 1970s. Since then, abortion has become a contentious issue within Brazil. Between 2000 and 2010, anti-abortion stances could be observed in a variety of political parties and stances and was largely influenced by the role of religion.

In 2005, a committee established by then-President Luiz Inácio Lula da Silva attempted to reform abortion laws but was stopped by the Commission on Social Security and Family. In 2024, Federal Deputy Sóstenes Cavalcante introduced PL 1904/2024, which would classify all abortions done after 22 weeks as homicide.

The Socialism and Liberty Party seeks to decriminalise abortion in Brazil.

== Public opinion ==
In a survey made in Ribeirão Preto (SP) in 2004, 70% of the Brazilian doctors responded that they didn't support the decriminalization of abortion in the country. The survey also suggested that 77% of the doctors of this region rejected the opinion that abortion should be carried out solely because of the woman's desire. Furthermore it suggested that 82.5% of these doctors also reject the legalization of abortion due to socioeconomic difficulties. Finally, in the case of a possible legalization, 17.5% of them would agree to carry it out professionally.

A March 2007 Datafolha/Folha de S.Paulo poll found that 65% of Brazilians believe that their country's current law "should not be modified", 16% that it should be expanded "to allow abortion in other cases", 10% that abortion should be "decriminalized", and 5% were "not sure".

Another poll on this issue was made in December 2010, by the polling institute Vox Populi. This study revealed that 82% of Brazilians consider that the current law on abortion should not be modified, while 14% consider that abortion should be decriminalized, and 4% declare to have no position on the matter.

In case of fetuses with microcephaly caused by Zika virus, 58% of the population expressed opposition.

Following the impeachment of former leftist President Dilma Rousseff, A survey of the Instituto Patricia Galvão, in 2017, showed that 62% of Brazilians opposed the idea of the legalization of abortion, while 26% supported the measure, another 10% could not answer. The opinion polls carried out by the Paraná Research Institute in the same year also concluded that 86.5% of Brazilians were against the decriminalization.

According to the Ibope (largest research institute in Brazil), in 2018, eight out of ten Brazilians oppose legalization. In a survey conducted in 2018, by the Datafolha Institute, 41% of Brazilians declared themselves in favor of a complete ban on abortion, 34% said they wanted to keep the legislation as it is, 16% said that they wanted to expand it to more situations and 6% said they were in favor of legalizing abortion under any circumstances. The anti-abortion view is also followed by the majority of federal deputies, which makes it virtually impossible to attempt to legalize abortion through the Legislative Branch. All of this has led the small group of abortion supporters to appeal to the Supreme Court, claiming that criminalization of abortion, "violates fundamental human precepts".

In 2021, a survey conducted by PoderData found that 58% of Brazilians are against the legalization of abortion in Brazil; those who are favorable of legalization add up to 31%. Another 11% did not know or did not respond. Another survey conducted in 2021 by Paraná Pesquisas, however, found that 79% of Brazilians remain against the legalization of abortion, and 16.6% are favorable to it.

In all the surveys carried out, in general, Brazilians are considered one of the peoples least in favor of legalizing abortion. Currently, Brazil is the biggest country in the world to ban abortion in the name of the recognition of the rights of the unborn.

== Excommunication controversy ==
In March 2009, after an abortion on a nine-year-old girl raped by her stepfather and pregnant with twins had been performed because of the rape exception clause in Brazil's Penal Code, Archbishop José Cardoso Sobrinho of Olinda and Recife stated that automatic excommunication had been incurred by the girl's mother and the medical team. President Lula da Silva and Health Minister José Gomes Temporão decried his statement, and the National Conference of Bishops of Brazil disowned it, saying that the mother was certainly not excommunicated and there was insufficient evidence to show that any member of the medical team was. The statement was criticized also on the Vatican newspaper by the President of the Pontifical Academy for Life. One of the doctors concerned said the controversy had drawn needed attention to Brazil's restrictive abortion laws.

== Anencephaly exception ==
In July 2004, a Brazilian federal judge issued a preliminary ruling that waived the requirement for court authorization for abortions in cases of fetuses with anencephaly. The Brazilian Council of Bishops lobbied against the ruling and the National Confederation of Healthcare Workers wanted to make the exception permanent. In October 2004, the full Brazilian Supreme Court convened and voted 7–4 to suspend the judge's ruling until the full tribunal had the opportunity to deliberate and rule on the matter.

A 2005 study found that 53% of doctors had performed an abortion in the case of a severely deformed fetus, even though that was not allowed by Brazilian law without a court order. Doctors who thought that the law should be more liberal were more likely to have correct knowledge of abortion law and to be familiar with the abortion law regarding severe fetal malformations.

On April 12, 2012, the Supreme Federal Court ruled by an 8–2 vote to legalize abortion in cases of fetuses with anencephaly, saying that children with anencephaly were biologically alive but that they were not a person, and therefore had no rights. The Catholic Church and Brazilian Pro-Life movements criticized the decision of the court, saying that even with a terminal illness, children with anencephaly also had the right to life.

== See also ==
- 2009 Brazilian girl abortion case
- Abortion by country
- Abortion law
- Reproductive rights in Latin America
