= Clinical Ophthalmology (journal) =

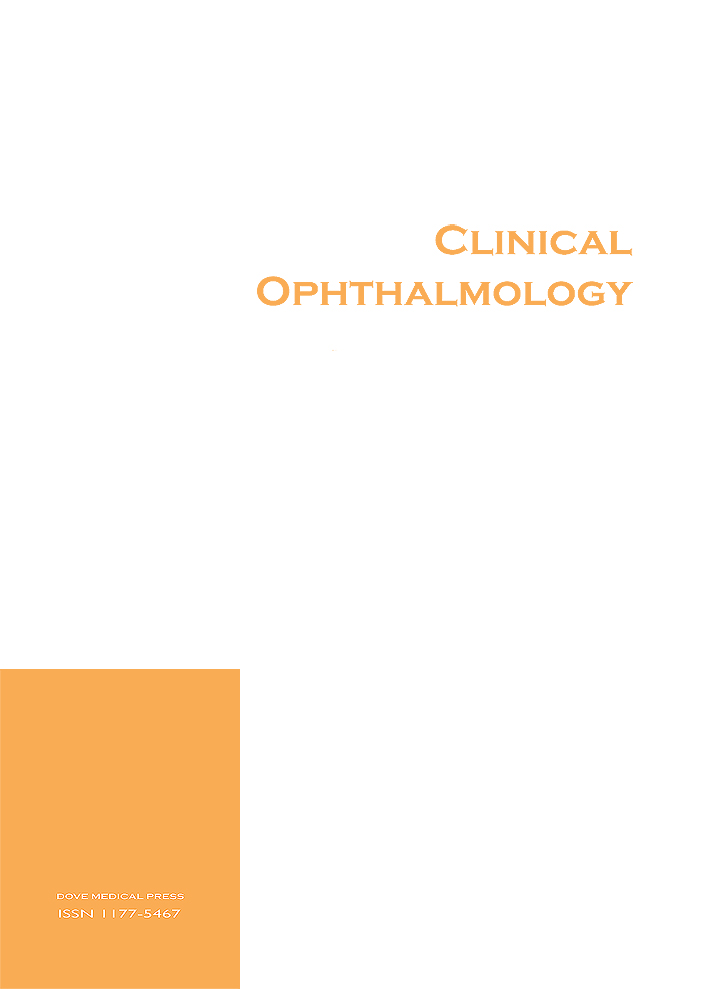
- Discipline: Ophthalmology
- Language: English
- Edited by: Sotiria Palioura

Publication details
- History: 2007-present
- Publisher: Dove Medical Press
- Frequency: Upon acceptance
- Open access: Yes

Standard abbreviations
- ISO 4: Clin. Ophthalmol.

Indexing
- ISSN: 1177-5467 (print); 1177-5483 (web)
- OCLC no.: 269413957

Links
- Journal homepage

The Journal of Clinical Ophthalmology is a peer-reviewed medical journal of ophthalmology. The journal was established in 2007 and is published by Dove Medical Press.
