= Patient Preference and Adherence =

- Discipline: Patient participation
- Language: English
- Edited by: Johnny Chen

Publication details
- History: 2007-present
- Publisher: Dove Medical Press
- Frequency: Upon acceptance
- Impact factor: 1.491 (2013)

Standard abbreviations
- ISO 4: Patient Prefer. Adherence

Indexing
- ISSN: 1177-889X
- OCLC no.: 502421001

Links
- Journal homepage

Patient Preference and Adherence is a peer-reviewed healthcare journal focusing on patient preference and adherence throughout the therapeutic continuum. The journal was established in 2007 and is published by Dove Medical Press.
