= African Journal of Health Sciences =

- Discipline: Healthcare
- Language: English
- Edited by: Davy Kiprotich Koech

Publication details
- History: 1994-present
- Publisher: Kenya Medical Research Institute
- Open access: Yes

Standard abbreviations
- ISO 4: Afr. J. Health Sci.

Indexing
- ISSN: 1022-9272 (print); 2306-1987 (web)
- LCCN: 94982342
- OCLC no.: 473147695

Links
- Journal homepage

The African Journal of Health Sciences is a peer-reviewed healthcare journal covering research and policy issues in the health sciences and related disciplines.
