= International Journal of General Medicine =

- Discipline: Medicine
- Language: English
- Edited by: Scott Fraser

Publication details
- History: 2008-present
- Publisher: Dove Medical Press
- Frequency: Upon acceptance
- Open access: Yes

Standard abbreviations
- ISO 4: Int. J. Gen. Med.

Indexing
- ISSN: 1178-7074
- LCCN: 2009263358
- OCLC no.: 502421378

Links
- Journal homepage

The International Journal of General Medicine is a peer-reviewed medical journal covering general and internal medicine. It was established in 2008 and is published by Dove Medical Press. The editor-in-chief is Scott Fraser. The journal is abstracted and indexed in PubMed, EMBASE, and Scopus.

In a 2013 article, The New Yorker described the International Journal as "an online publication widely regarded as a vanity press."
