= International Journal of Chronic Obstructive Pulmonary Disease =

Medical journal established in 2006

- Discipline: Pulmonology
- Language: English
- Edited by: Richard E. Russell

Publication details
- History: 2006–present
- Publisher: Dove Medical Press
- Frequency: Upon acceptance
- Open access: Yes
- Impact factor: 3.157 (2016)

Standard abbreviations
- ISO 4: Int. J. Chronic Obstr. Pulm. Dis.
- NLM: Int J Chron Obstruct Pulmon Dis

Indexing
- ISSN: 1176-9106 (print); 1178-2005 (web)
- OCLC no.: 785823051

Links
- Journal homepage

The International Journal of Chronic Obstructive Pulmonary Disease is a peer-reviewed medical journal focusing on chronic obstructive pulmonary disease. It was established in 2006; from 2009 it has been available only online. It is published by Dove Medical Press.

It is indexed in the Science Citation Index, and the full text of articles are available at PubMed Central.
