= Clinical and Experimental Gastroenterology =

- Discipline: Gastroenterology
- Language: English
- Edited by: Andreas M Kaiser

Publication details
- History: 2008-present
- Publisher: Dove Medical Press
- Frequency: Upon acceptance

Standard abbreviations
- ISO 4: Clin. Exp. Gastroenterol.

Indexing
- ISSN: 1178-7023
- OCLC no.: 319601991

Links
- Journal homepage

Clinical and Experimental Gastroenterology is a peer-reviewed medical journal covering research in gastroenterology. The journal was established in 2008 and is published by Dove Medical Press.
