= Biologics: Targets and Therapy =

British peer-reviewed medical journal

- Discipline: Biological agents
- Language: English
- Edited by: Doris Mangiaracina Benbrook

Publication details
- History: 2007-present
- Publisher: Dove Medical Press
- Frequency: Upon acceptance
- Open access: Yes

Standard abbreviations
- ISO 4: Biol.: Targets Ther.

Indexing
- ISSN: 1177-5475 (print); 1177-5491 (web)
- OCLC no.: 754942526

Links
- Journal homepage

Biologics: Targets and Therapy is a peer-reviewed medical journal covering research on the clinical application of biologic agents in the management of pathologies where a molecular target can be identified. The journal was established in 2007 and is published by Dove Medical Press.
