= Journal of Inflammation Research =

- Discipline: Inflammation
- Language: English
- Edited by: Ning Quan

Publication details
- History: 2008-present
- Publisher: Dove Medical Press
- Frequency: Upon acceptance
- Open access: Yes
- License: CC BY-NC 3.0
- Impact factor: 6.922 (2020)

Standard abbreviations
- ISO 4: J. Inflamm. Res.

Indexing
- ISSN: 1178-7031
- OCLC no.: 335214849

Links
- Journal homepage; Journal articles

The Journal of Inflammation Research is a peer-reviewed medical journal covering research on inflammation. The journal was established in 2008 and is published by Dove Medical Press. According to the Journal Citation Reports, the journal has a 2020 impact factor of 6.922.
