= Clinical Interventions in Aging =

- Discipline: Gerontology
- Language: English
- Edited by: Richard F. Walker

Publication details
- History: 2006–present
- Publisher: Dove Medical Press
- Frequency: Upon acceptance
- Open access: Yes
- Impact factor: 2.651 (2012)

Standard abbreviations
- ISO 4: Clin. Interv. Aging

Indexing
- CODEN: CIALBC
- ISSN: 1176-9092 (print); 1178-1998 (web)
- OCLC no.: 317918656

Links
- Journal homepage

Clinical Interventions in Aging is a peer-reviewed open access medical journal covering research in gerontology. The journal was established in 2006 and is published by Dove Medical Press. The editor-in-chief is Nandu Goswami of the University of Graz.

== Abstracting and indexing ==
The journal is abstracted and indexed in:

- Chemical Abstracts Service
- Science Citation Index Expanded
- Current Contents/Clinical Medicine
- Embase
- EMCare
- Scopus

According to the Journal Citation Reports, the journal has a 2012 impact factor of 2.651.
