= Infection and Drug Resistance =

- Discipline: Drug resistance
- Language: English
- Edited by: Suresh Antony

Publication details
- History: 2008-present
- Publisher: Dove Medical Press
- Frequency: Upon acceptance
- Open access: Yes
- Impact factor: 3.9 (2022)

Standard abbreviations
- ISO 4: Infect. Drug Resist.

Indexing
- ISSN: 1178-6973
- OCLC no.: 335291948

Links
- Journal homepage

Infection and Drug Resistance is a peer-reviewed medical journal covering research on infection treatments and strategies. The journal was established in 2008 and is published by Dove Medical Press. It is abstracted and indexed in PubMed, EMBASE, and Scopus.
