= Health Services Management Research =

- Discipline: Healthcare management
- Language: English
- Edited by: Federico Lega

Publication details
- History: 1988-present
- Publisher: SAGE Publications
- Frequency: Quarterly

Standard abbreviations
- ISO 4: Health Serv. Manag. Res.
- NLM: Health Serv Manage Res

Indexing
- CODEN: HSRMEO
- ISSN: 0951-4848 (print); 1758-1044 (web)
- OCLC no.: 223368867

Links
- Journal homepage; Online access; Online archive

Health Services Management Research (HSMR) is a peer-reviewed academic journal that publishes papers four times a year in the field of Healthcare management. The journal's editor-in-chief is Federico Lega (Bocconi University, Italy). It has been in publication since 1988 and is currently published by SAGE Publications. HSMR is the official journal of the European Health Management Association (EHMA).

== Aims and scope ==
Health Services Management Research (HSMR) is an authoritative international peer-reviewed journal which exists to publish theoretically and empirically rigorous research on questions of enduring interest and concern to health-care organizations and systems throughout the world.

It aims to serve an international community of academics and researchers on the one hand and healthcare managers, executives, policymakers and clinicians on the other. With that in mind it aims to make a substantial contribution both to research and to managerial practice, and particular emphasis is placed on publishing research papers which offer actionable findings and on promoting knowledge mobilisation.

== Abstracting and indexing ==
Health Services Management Research is abstracted and indexed in the following databases:

- PubMed/MEDLINE
- Scopus
- OCLC Electronic Collections Online
- CINAHL
