= Neuropsychiatric Disease and Treatment =

- Discipline: Psychiatry, neurology
- Language: English
- Edited by: Roger M. Pinder

Publication details
- History: 2005-present
- Publisher: Dove Medical Press
- Frequency: Upon acceptance
- Open access: Yes
- Impact factor: 1.741 (2015)

Standard abbreviations
- ISO 4: Neuropsychiatr. Dis. Treat.

Indexing
- ISSN: 1176-6328 (print); 1178-2021 (web)
- OCLC no.: 785823009

Links
- Journal homepage

Neuropsychiatric Disease and Treatment is a peer-reviewed medical journal covering research in psychiatry and neurology. The journal was established in 2005 and is published by Dove Medical Press.
