= HIV/AIDS: Research and Palliative Care =

- Discipline: HIV/AIDS, palliative care
- Language: English
- Edited by: Shenghan Lai

Publication details
- History: 2009–present
- Publisher: Dove Medical Press
- Frequency: Upon acceptance
- Open access: Yes

Standard abbreviations
- ISO 4: HIV/AIDS (Auckl.)
- NLM: HIV AIDS (Auckl)

Indexing
- ISSN: 1179-1373
- LCCN: 2010247828
- OCLC no.: 435646745

Links
- Journal homepage

HIV/AIDS: Research and Palliative Care is a peer-reviewed medical journal covering HIV and its treatment. The journal was established in 2009 and is published by Dove Medical Press. It is abstracted and indexed in PubMed, EMBASE, EmCare, and Scopus.
