= Advances and Applications in Bioinformatics and Chemistry =

- Discipline: Bioinformatics
- Language: English

Publication details
- History: 2008-2025
- Publisher: Dove Medical Press
- Open access: Yes

Standard abbreviations
- ISO 4: Adv. Appl. Bioinform. Chem.

Indexing
- ISSN: 1178-6949
- OCLC no.: 613192984

Links
- Journal homepage

Advances and Applications in Bioinformatics and Chemistry was a peer-reviewed scientific journal covering research in bioinformatics, which ceased publication in 2025. It was established in 2008 and was published by Dove Medical Press.
