= Millbrook House =

English training centre for disabled people

Coordinates: 50.7268°N 3.5285°W

Millbrook House is a training centre for disabled people in Exeter, Devon, England founded in 1937 by Dame Georgiana Buller. It was the first school dedicated to occupational therapy training in the United Kingdom.

The first intake of students began their training on 27 September 1944. The school became affiliated with the University of Exeter and the university validated all its courses. It was later renamed St Loye's College for Training the Disabled.

In 1999 the school changed its name to St Loye's School of Health Studies.

Since 2003 St Loye's has been part of the School of Health Professions of the University of Plymouth.

== Notable alumni ==
- Yvonne Thomas, professor and occupational therapist in New Zealand
