= OncoTargets and Therapy =

- Discipline: Oncology
- Language: English
- Edited by: Faris Farassati

Publication details
- History: 2008–present
- Publisher: Dove Medical Press
- Frequency: Upon acceptance
- Open access: Yes
- Impact factor: 4.345 (2021)

Standard abbreviations
- ISO 4: OncoTargets Ther.

Indexing
- ISSN: 1178-6930
- OCLC no.: 335291943

Links
- Journal homepage

OncoTargets and Therapy is a peer-reviewed medical journal covering research on all aspects of oncology. The journal was established in 2008 and is published by Dove Medical Press. Its current editor-in-chief is Dr. Gaetano Romano (Temple University).

Currently, the journal is abstracted and indexed in PubMed, Scopus, and others.

The journal has a 2021 impact factor of 4.345.
