= ALX1 =

Protein-coding gene in humans

Identifiers
- Aliases: ALX1, CART1, FND3, HEL23, ALX homeobox 1
- External IDs: OMIM: 601527; MGI: 104621; GeneCards: ALX1

Gene location (Human)
Chr.	Chromosome 12 (human)
Band	12q21.31	Start	85,280,220 bp
Band	12q21.31	End	85,301,784 bp

Gene location (Mouse)
Chr.	Chromosome 10 (mouse)
Band	10 D1|10 53.56 cM	Start	102,834,568 bp
Band	10 D1|10 53.56 cM	End	102,866,076 bp
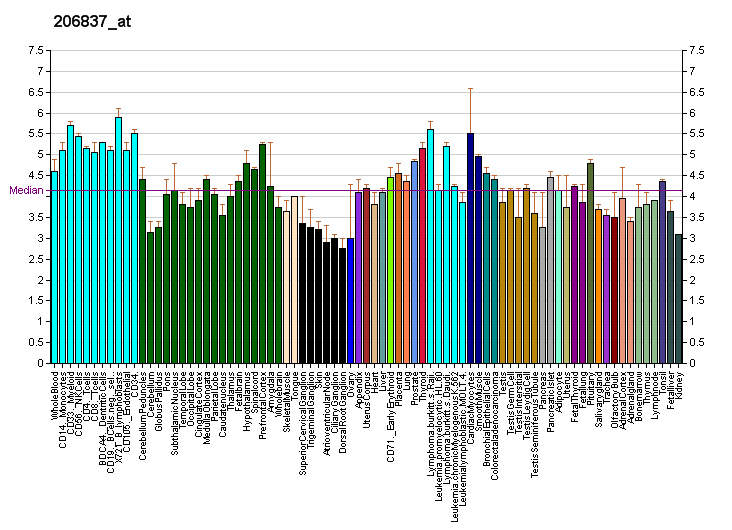
RNA expression pattern
Bgee	Human / Mouse (ortholog); Top expressed in: gonad; left uterine tube; minor salivary glands; olfactory zone of nasal mucosa; stromal cell of endometrium; popliteal artery; tibial arteries; canal of the cervix; human kidney; corpus epididymis / Top expressed in: maxillary prominence; cartilage of the septum; spermatocyte; medial nasal prominence; lateral nasal prominence; spermatid; Smooth muscle tissue of renal pelvis; embryo; urethra; abdominal wall; More reference expression data
BioGPS	More reference expression data
Gene ontology
Molecular function	DNA binding; sequence-specific DNA binding; RNA polymerase II transcription regulatory region sequence-specific DNA binding; protein homodimerization activity; transcription corepressor activity; DNA-binding transcription factor activity; DNA-binding transcription activator activity, RNA polymerase II-specific; protein binding; protein heterodimerization activity; DNA-binding transcription factor activity, RNA polymerase II-specific
Cellular component	Golgi apparatus; transcription regulator complex; nucleoplasm; nucleus; nuclear body
Biological process	embryonic skeletal system morphogenesis; roof of mouth development; regulation of transcription, DNA-templated; negative regulation of transcription by RNA polymerase II; transcription by RNA polymerase II; positive regulation of epithelial to mesenchymal transition; transcription, DNA-templated; multicellular organism development; positive regulation of transcription, DNA-templated; neural tube closure; embryonic limb morphogenesis; mesenchymal cell development; cartilage condensation; anterior/posterior pattern specification; positive regulation of transcription by RNA polymerase II; neural crest cell migration; negative regulation of transcription, DNA-templated
Sources:Amigo / QuickGO
Orthologs
Databases	NCBI: entry; OMA: entry
Species	Human	Mouse
Entrez	8092	216285
Ensembl	ENSG00000180318	ENSMUSG00000036602
UniProt	Q15699	Q8C8B0
RefSeq (mRNA)	NM_006982	NM_172553
RefSeq (protein)	NP_008913	NP_766141
Location (UCSC)	Chr 12: 85.28 – 85.3 Mb	Chr 10: 102.83 – 102.87 Mb
PubMed search
- Wikidata
View/Edit Human	View/Edit Mouse

ALX homeobox protein 1 is a protein that in humans is encoded by the ALX1 gene.

== Function ==
The specific function of this gene has yet to be determined in humans; however, in rodents, it is necessary for survival of the forebrain mesenchyme and may also be involved in development of the cervix. Mutations in the mouse gene lead to neural tube defects such as acrania and meroanencephaly.

In Burmese cats, especially the lineage known as Contemporary Burmese, a deletion of four aminoacids in ALX1 is common. When heterozygous, the mutation causes brachycephaly; when homozygous it causes a fatal head malformation known as Burmese head defect.

In Darwin's finches, inhabiting the Galápagos islands, ALX1 has been linked to the diversity of beak shapes.

== Interactions ==
ALX1 has been shown to interact with IPO13.
