= Acrania =

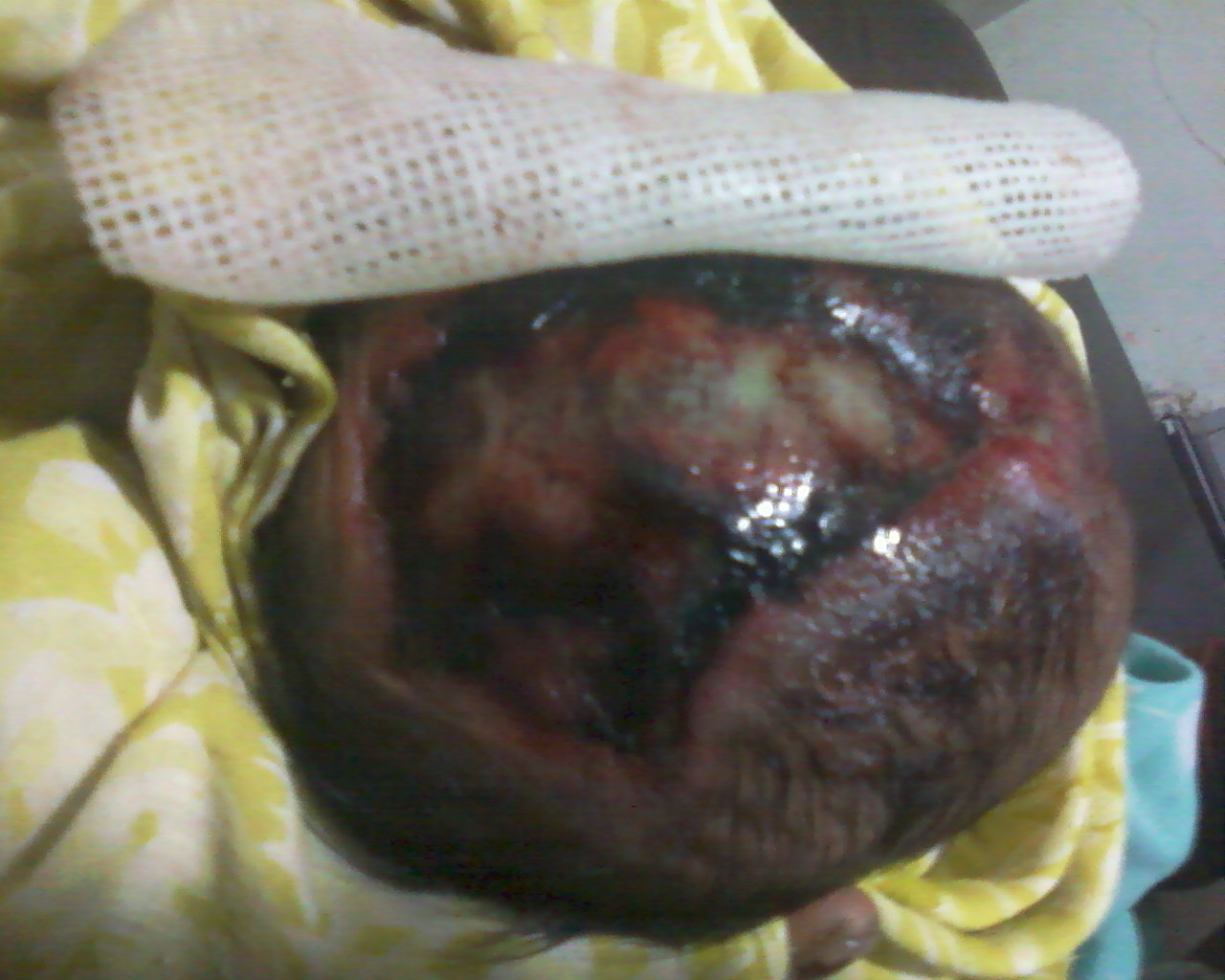
- Partial absence of skull, bones, and scalp
- Specialty: Medical genetics

Acrania is a rare congenital disorder that occurs in the human fetus in which the flat bones in the cranial vault are either completely or partially absent. The cerebral hemispheres develop completely but abnormally. The condition is frequently, though not always, associated with anencephaly. The fetus is said to have acrania if it meets the following criteria: the fetus should have a perfectly normal facial bone, a normal cervical column but without the fetal skull and a volume of brain tissue equivalent to at least one-third of the normal brain size.

== Causes ==
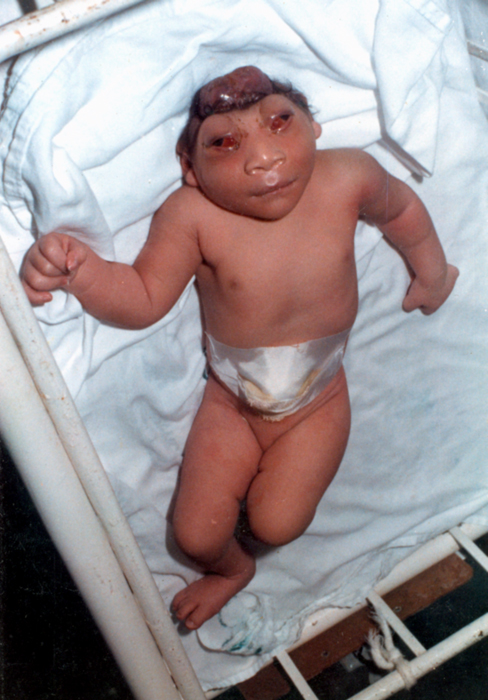
Infant with both acrania and anencephaly

=== Genetics ===
Recent work has identified mutations in the hedgehog acyltransferase (HHAT) gene that have caused acrania along with holoprosencephaly and agnathia. The mutation in HHAT which causes this disease is a loss-of-function mutation. Before this discovery in 2010, HHAT was known to play a role in the sonic hedgehog pathway. When HHAT contains a loss-of-function mutation, less HHAT protein is produced. HHAT is necessary for the production of Hedgehog (Hh) proteins post-transcriptionally. As HHAT production decreases, production of long-range Hh proteins decreases proportionally. Decreases in Hh| production disturb the production of extracellular signal-regulated kinases, bone morphogenetic proteins, and fibroblast growth factors, all of which play important roles in craniofacial patterning. Disruption of these pathways leads to abnormal bone and cartilage formation causing acrania and multiple other craniofacial patterning problems.

==== Genetic counseling ====
Little genetic counseling can be offered for acrania because the genetic origins are not fully understood. In order to make genetic counseling for families easier this disease is often differentially diagnosed with other diseases that can occur at the same time such as anencephaly and acalvaria, though these diseases may not always occur simultaneously. Recurrence rates are extremely low, so genetic counseling is not always necessary.

=== Amniotic band syndrome ===
During amniotic band syndrome (ABS), fibrous bands may entrap various parts of the developing fetus causing malformations. When these fibrous bands form around the developing skull, the bones will not form properly. ABS occurring in the developing brain neural tissue is one cause of acrania. When ABS is the cause of acrania the fibrous bands cannot be detected through ultrasound.

== Mechanism ==
During the fourth week of human development the neuropore in a normally developing fetus closes. When this process is either interrupted or never initiated, acrania occurs. The desmocranium becomes a membranous coverage instead of forming the epidermis of the scalp. Whether from being blocked by amniotic bands or by just not initiating, the migration of mesenchyme under the ectoderm does not occur. Because this migration does not occur, the skull, and all involved muscles, are never formed. Without the presence of the neurocranium, the brain fails to separate into two separate lobes. The hindbrain proceeds to develop normally, allowing for the child to be carried to term, but the diencephalon and ocular lobe remain small and underdeveloped.

=== Ectodermal mesenchyme ===
Mesenchyme is formed in the developing embryo and will eventually become cartilage and bone. When ectodermal mesenchyme fails to migrate into the head region of the embryo, the skull will not be able to form. What exactly causes the failure of mesenchymal migration is unknown.

== Diagnosis ==
Acrania can be diagnosed early in pregnancy through an ultrasound. This abnormality appears during the beginning or end of the fourth week of the fetus's development. An absence of the skull is needed in order to make a diagnosis. A presence of brain tissue will confirm the diagnosis of acrania and differentiate it from other developmental problems such as anencephaly.

== Prognosis ==
Acrania is rare, occurring in 1 in 20,000 live births. Acrania may cause a fetus to spontaneously abort before reaching term.
