= Liz O'Riordan =

British breast surgeon (born 1974)

- Born: Elizabeth Louise Ball; 1974 (age 51–52)
- Other name: Liz Ball
- Occupation: Surgeon
- Known for: Breast cancer awareness

Academic background
- Education: University of Wales College
- Thesis: "Molecular mechanisms of human thyroid tumorigenesis" (2008)

Academic work
- Institutions: Ipswich Hospital
- Main interests: Breast-conserving surgery
- Notable works: The Complete Guide to Breast Cancer (2018); Under the Knife (2023)
- Website: liz.oriordan.co.uk

Elizabeth Louise O'Riordan (née Ball; born 1974) is a British retired breast surgeon, known for her work in breast cancer awareness by openly discussing her personal experiences in being diagnosed and treated for breast cancer.

O'Riordan trained in oncoplastic breast surgery at the Royal Marsden Hospital, London. In 2015 she was appointed consultant in oncoplastic surgery at Ipswich Hospital in Suffolk. Two years into that post she was diagnosed with breast cancer and since then regularly blogs, tweets, creates podcasts, and in 2016 delivered a TED Talk. In addition, having experienced being a patient, she talks to physicians about it.

Her self-help book completed with professor of primary care Trisha Greenhalgh, titled The Complete Guide to Breast Cancer, was published in 2018. That year, a statue showing her topless was unveiled in her home town of Bury St Edmunds. Around the same time she retired from her surgical job following a recurrence of the disease and further treatment that resulted in an inability to properly use her left arm.

Her memoir Under the Knife was released in July 2023, around the same time as discovering she had breast cancer for the third time. O'Riordan was also recognized as one of the 100 Influential Women in Oncology by OncoDaily.

== Early life and education ==
Elizabeth Louise O'Riordan née Ball, was born in 1974 to surgeon and general practitioner Keith Ball and his wife Isobel, a nurse. She has one brother.

After observing colorectal surgery during sixth form work experience, she decided she wished to be a surgeon. She gained admission to the University of Wales College of Cardiff and subsequently received her medical degree in 1998.

== Surgical career ==
O'Riordan completed her early surgical training in South Wales, where her first junior post was in paediatric surgery. Under the supervision of David Wynford-Thomas at Cardiff University, she studied the molecular genetics of thyroid cancer, completed her doctoral thesis and received her PhD in 2008. In 2011 she was granted a fellowship in oncoplastic surgery at the Royal Marsden Hospital, London. During her time there, she began a master's in that same specialty at the University of East Anglia. Ipswich Hospital in Suffolk, subsequently appointed her consultant surgeon in oncoplastic surgery in 2013.

== Breast cancer ==
In 2015, O'Riordan was diagnosed with stage 3 breast cancer. She had previously had two harmless breast cysts in 2010 and 2014, and thought this third lump would be the same. Tests revealed a cancer, following which she completed chemotherapy and underwent a mastectomy.

Throughout her treatment and recovery, O'Riordan turned to exercise and started raising awareness about breast cancer. She began engaging in public speaking, and delivered a TED Talk in Germany, titled "The Jar of Joy", in 2016. She also took to blogging and Twitter, posting about breast cancer, among other topics. Having experienced being a patient, she also talks to physicians about it. Following treatment, she returned to work in November 2017.

In 2018, due to local recurrence of the cancer, she required further surgery followed by radiotherapy. Having been called "incredible" for her efforts in breast cancer awareness, she decided to attend her last radiotherapy session dressed as Elastigirl, also known as Mrs Incredible, a character from the film The Incredibles. In an interview for the BBC, she noted that, as she walked through the hospital in her outfit, children attending their cancer treatments looked at her and laughed. She said:

...it was the scariest thing I've ever done, walking through Addenbrooke's from the car park, through the concourse past all these strangers – it was really daunting, but felt amazing knowing people were thinking, 'who is she, what's she doing and where is she going?

O'Riordan retired later the same year, due to an inability to properly use her left arm as a result of cancer treatment. After retirement, she has continued to speak in public. The Complete Guide to Breast Cancer, authored by O'Riordan and professor of primary care Trisha Greenhalgh, was published in 2018. Her podcast "Don't Ignore The Elephant" was created in 2020. Her memoir Under the Knife was released in 2023.

In 2023, O'Riordan was diagnosed with breast cancer for the third time.

== Awards and honours ==
O'Riordan was nominated for two awards in 2016; a 'Woman of the Year' award, and the Health Education England Patient Leadership award. In 2017, the UK Blog Awards highly commended her for her blog 'Breast Surgeon with Breast Cancer'. In the same year she was nominated one of Medscape's best physicians of the year.

In 2018 O'Riordan unveiled a statue of herself in her hometown of Bury St Edmunds. It was created by Non zero one following her mastectomy, and shows her topless, holding a cyclist's helmet and wearing a triathlon medal.

== Personal and family ==
O'Riordan is married to consultant surgeon Dermot O'Riordan. Following her mother's diagnosis of bone cancer and subsequent death due to spread of the disease, O'Riordan has campaigned to raise awareness of more rare cancers.

== Selected publications ==
=== Books ===
- The Complete Guide to Breast Cancer. Random House. 2018. ISBN 978-1-4735-5702-4. (Co-author)
- Cracking the Intercollegiate General Surgery FRCS Viva 2e: A Revision Guide. Boca Raton: CRC Press. 2021. ISBN 978-1-000-20419-3. (Co-author)
- Under the Knife. Unbound Publishing. 2023. ISBN 978-1-80018-242-4.

=== Articles ===
- Ball, E. L.; Walsh, S. R.; Tang, T. Y.; Gohil, R.; Clarke, J M F. (December 2010). "Role of ultrasonography in the diagnosis of temporal arteritis". The British Journal of Surgery. 97 (12): 1765–1771. doi:10.1002/bjs.7252. ISSN 1365-2168. PMID 20799290. S2CID 31285535. (Co-author)
- Ball, E. L.; Sanjay, P.; Woodward, A. (April 2006). "Comparison of buffered and unbuffered local anaesthesia for inguinal hernia repair: a prospective study". Hernia: The Journal of Hernias and Abdominal Wall Surgery. 10 (2): 175–178. doi:10.1007/s10029-005-0058-y. ISSN 1265-4906. PMID 16424994. S2CID 25453912. (Co-author)
- O'Riordan, Elizabeth Louise (2019). "Reflections from a breast surgeon with breast cancer on how to improve cancer care". ecancermedicalscience. 13: 983. doi:10.3332/ecancer.2019.983. ISSN 1754-6605. PMC 6974364. PMID 32010207. (Co-author)
- Rojas, Kristin; Spring, Laura M.; o'Riordan, Liz; Weiss, Anna (26 July 2023). "Endocrine Therapy for Surgeons: Practical Pearls for Managing Menopausal, Bone Loss and Sexual Adverse Effects". Annals of Surgical Oncology. 30 (10): 5951–5961. doi:10.1245/s10434-023-13907-4. ISSN 1534-4681. PMID 37495843. S2CID 260201378. (Co-author)
