= American College of Healthcare Executives =

Healthcare administration organization

- Formation: 1933
- Type: Healthcare Association
- Headquarters: Chicago, IL
- Members: over 49,000
- President and CEO: Deborah J. Bowen
- Website: ache.org

The American College of Healthcare Executives (ACHE) is a professional society for healthcare executives and hospital directors in the United States which was established in 1933.

== History ==
ACHE was founded in 1933 as the American College of Hospital Administrators (ACHA) by a group of hospital administrators seeking to promote professionalism and advance the field of hospital management. The organization rebranded to its current name, the American College of Healthcare Executives, in the mid-1980s. ACHE is a 501(c)(6) organization.

Today, ACHE is focused on "advancing integrity, lifelong learning, leadership skills and diversity and inclusion" and offering certifications for experience healthcare administrators. In 2022, ACHE had $12 million in revenue, and its Foundation arm had $14 million in revenue.

== Mission ==
The primary mission of ACHE is to advance the practice of healthcare management by developing and supporting leaders in the field, and offer support to its local chapters.

ACHE works to influence healthcare policy, promote leadership development, and provide financial support to aspiring healthcare management college students. ACHE offers educational and professional development programs to its members, including an annual conference featuring keynote speakers, workshops, and networking opportunities. The origination also conducts industry surveys of healthcare executives to examine current trends and challenges.

ACHE provides a "Fellow of the American College of Healthcare Executives" (FACHE) certification for qualified professionals whose experience exemplifies "a mastery of healthcare management" through a written exam and continuing education.

== Membership ==
ACHE's membership is currently composed of roughly 49,000 healthcare executives, including hospital and health system administrators, consultants, and educators. Members are typically individuals with significant experience in healthcare management and leadership roles.

== Publications and resources ==
ACHE publishes several journals and periodicals to support healthcare executives, including:

- Healthcare Executive Magazine: A quarterly publication providing insights, trends, and professional development resources in healthcare management.
- Journal of Healthcare Management: A peer-reviewed journal featuring research articles, case studies, and theoretical papers on healthcare management.
