= International Journal of Nanomedicine =

- Discipline: Nanomedicine
- Language: English
- Edited by: Thomas J. Webster

Publication details
- History: 2006–present
- Publisher: Dove Medical Press
- Open access: Yes
- Impact factor: 8.0 (5 year impact 8.1) (2022)

Standard abbreviations
- ISO 4: Int. J. Nanomed.

Indexing
- ISSN: 1176-9114 (print); 1178-2013 (web)
- OCLC no.: 173846180

Links
- Journal homepage

The International Journal of Nanomedicine is a peer-reviewed medical journal covering research on the application of nanotechnology in diagnostics, therapeutics, and drug delivery systems throughout the biomedical field. The journal was established in 2006 and is published by Dove Medical Press.
