= Journal for Healthcare Quality =

- Discipline: Healthcare
- Language: English
- Edited by: P.H. Maulik Joshi

Publication details
- Former name(s): Journal of Quality Assurance
- History: 1979-present
- Publisher: Wiley-Blackwell on behalf of the National Association for Healthcare Quality (United States)
- Frequency: Bimonthly

Standard abbreviations
- ISO 4: J. Healthc. Qual.

Indexing
- ISSN: 1062-2551 (print); 1945-1474 (web)
- LCCN: sn92033109
- OCLC no.: 663614524

Links
- Journal homepage; Online access; Online archive; Journal page at association's website

The Journal for Healthcare Quality is a bimonthly peer-reviewed healthcare journal published by Wiley-Blackwell on behalf of the National Association for Healthcare Quality.

== History ==
The journal was preceded by View and Review, which was renamed in 1979 to Journal of Quality Assurance, the official journal for the National Association of Quality Assurance Professionals, whose executive director, David Stumph, was the editor-in-chief. While a few articles appeared in this journal, most of the content consisted of organizational news stories, making it more of a news magazine than an academic journal. In 1991, the journal obtained its current title, when the association changed its name to National Association for Healthcare Quality.

== Abstracting and indexing ==
The journal is abstracted and indexed in CINAHL and MEDLINE/PubMed.
