= Clinical, Cosmetic and Investigational Dermatology =

Academic journal

- Discipline: Dermatology
- Language: English
- Edited by: Jeffrey M. Weinberg

Publication details
- History: 2008-present
- Publisher: Dove Medical Press
- Frequency: Upon acceptance

Standard abbreviations
- ISO 4: Clin. Cosmet. Investig. Dermatol.

Indexing
- ISSN: 1178-7015
- OCLC no.: 423069213

Links
- Journal homepage

Clinical, Cosmetic and Investigational Dermatology is a peer-reviewed medical journal covering research in dermatology. The journal was established in 2008 and is published by Dove Medical Press.
