= Journal of Pain Research =

- Discipline: Neurology, psychophysiology
- Language: English
- Edited by: Michael Schatman

Publication details
- History: 2008–present
- Publisher: Dove Medical Press
- Frequency: Continuous
- Open access: Yes
- License: CC BY-NC
- Impact factor: 2.5 (2023)

Standard abbreviations
- ISO 4: J. Pain Res.

Indexing
- ISSN: 1178-7090
- OCLC no.: 502473165

Links
- Journal homepage

The Journal of Pain Research is a peer-reviewed open-access medical journal focusing on pain research and the prevention and management of pain. The journal was established in 2008 and is published by Dove Medical Press.
