= International Journal of Women's Health =

- Discipline: Women's health
- Language: English
- Edited by: Elie D. Al-Chaer

Publication details
- History: 2009-present
- Publisher: Dove Medical Press
- Open access: Yes

Standard abbreviations
- ISO 4: Int. J. Women's Health

Indexing
- ISSN: 1179-1411
- OCLC no.: 319595341

Links
- Journal homepage

The International Journal of Women's Health is a peer-reviewed healthcare journal focusing on all aspects of women's health care, including obstetrics, gynecology, and breast cancer. The editor-in-chief is Elie D. Al-Chaer (University of Arkansas for Medical Sciences). The journal is published by Dove Medical Press and it is abstracted and indexed in EMBASE and Scopus.
