= Under the Knife (book) =

2023 book by Liz O'Riordan

- Author: Liz O'Riordan
- Language: English
- Publisher: Unbound
- Publication date: 2023
- Publication place: UK

Under the Knife is the memoir of retired breast surgeon Liz O'Riordan, published by Unbound in 2023. It tells the story of her surgical career and life once diagnosed with breast cancer.
