= Clinical Epidemiology (journal) =

- Discipline: Epidemiology
- Language: English
- Edited by: Henrik Toft Sorensen

Publication details
- History: 2009-present
- Publisher: Dove Medical Press
- Frequency: Upon acceptance
- Open access: Yes

Standard abbreviations
- ISO 4: Clin. Epidemiol.

Indexing
- ISSN: 1179-1349
- OCLC no.: 335214840

Links
- Journal homepage

Clinical Epidemiology is a peer-reviewed medical journal covering research in epidemiology. It was established in 2009 and is published by the publisher Dove Medical Press. Clinical Epidemiology has published over 100 papers since 2009. The journal has also been indexed in PubMed.
