= American Journal of Biomedical Science and Research =

- Discipline: General medical
- Language: English

Publication details
- History: 2019–present
- Publisher: BiomedGrid
- Open access: Yes

Standard abbreviations
- ISO 4: Am. J. Biomed. Sci. Res.

Indexing
- ISSN: 2642-1747

Links
- Journal homepage

The American Journal of Biomedical Science and Research is an open-access medical journal for scientific and technical research papers. It is published by BiomedGrid. The journal has been included on the updated Beall's List of potential predatory open-access journals, and has faced other criticisms of its publishing practices. In 2020, it published a fake scientific paper which claimed that a bat-like Pokémon sparked the spread of COVID-19 in a fictional city.

== Activities ==
The journal's publisher Biomedgrid LLC was first registered in California in 2018 by Sasidhar Vontethina and Sushma Manchikanti. The journal has been publishing online articles since January 2019. It uses an open-access model of publishing which charges the authors. The company claims that articles are peer reviewed.

The journal has no editor-in-chief. Time between submission of an article and its publication after the process of peer review, commenting, revision and editing frequently does not extend beyond 15 days, and might even require only 6 days. Such times are very short, compared with those required for a thorough peer review process in recognized academic journals.

The journal reports an "ISI impact factor". This impact factor is not from the Institute for Scientific Information (ISI) or its successor Clarivate, but from a company named International Scientific Indexing. That company has been listed as potentially misleading on Beall's list of potential predatory open-access journals and publishers.

== Criticism ==
The journal was listed in the updated Beall's List of potential predatory open-access journals. It has been criticized for sending out email spam to scientists, calling out for papers for the journal. The ISI impact factor reported by the journal was criticized as misleading, since it does not refer to the recognized Web of Science ISI index, but to the product of a company which does not reveal how the alleged impact factor is actually calculated.

In March 2020, the journal published the fake research paper "Cyllage City COVID-19 outbreak linked to Zubat consumption". The paper blamed a fictional creature for an outbreak of COVID-19 in a fictional city, cited fictional references (including one from author Bruce Wayne in a made-up journal named "Gotham Forensics Quarterly" on using bats to fight crime), and was cowritten by fictional authors such as Pokémon's Nurse Joy and House, M.D. The author was a scientist from National Taiwan University, who acted under a pseudonym. Four days after submission the paper was accepted for publication. Since the line in the article “a journal publishing this paper does not practice peer review and must therefore be predatory” was not objected to, the submitting author concluded that the paper had not been reviewed at all. The paper was later removed as the author did not pay the publication fees.
