= Journal of Health Management =

- Discipline: Management, healthcare
- Language: English
- Edited by: S.D. Gupta

Publication details
- History: 1990–present
- Publisher: Sage Publishing on behalf of the Indian Institute of Health Management Research
- Frequency: Quarterly
- Impact factor: 1.0 (2023)

Standard abbreviations
- ISO 4: J. Health Manag.

Indexing
- ISSN: 0972-0634 (print); 0973-0729 (web)

Links
- Journal homepage; Online access; Online archive

The Journal of Health Management is a quarterly peer-reviewed academic journal covering health policy and health management in developing countries. It is published by Sage Publishing on behalf of the Indian Institute of Health Management Research and the editor-in-chief is S.D. Gupta (Indian Institute of Health Management Research).

== Abstracting and indexing ==
The journal is abstracted and indexed in:

- CAB Abstracts
- CINAHL
- Emerging Sources Citation Index
- Scopus

According to the Journal Citation Reports, the journal has a 2023 impact factor of 1.0.
