= Critical Reviews in Physical and Rehabilitation Medicine =

- Discipline: Physical medicine and rehabilitation
- Language: English
- Edited by: Markad Kamath

Publication details
- History: 1989–present
- Publisher: Begell House
- Frequency: Quarterly

Standard abbreviations
- ISO 4: Crit. Rev. Phys. Rehabil. Med.

Indexing
- ISSN: 0896-2960

Links
- Journal homepage

Critical Reviews in Physical and Rehabilitation Medicine is a quarterly scientific journal published by Begell House covering the field of physical medicine and rehabilitation. The editor-in-chief is Markad Kamath.
