= Journal of Medical Marketing =

- Discipline: Management
- Language: English
- Edited by: Brian D Smith

Publication details
- History: 2000 - 2017
- Publisher: SAGE Publications
- Frequency: Quarterly
- Impact factor: (2010)

Standard abbreviations
- ISO 4: J. Med. Mark.

Indexing
- ISSN: 1745-7904
- OCLC no.: 728403995

Links
- Journal homepage; Online access; Online archive

The Journal of Medical Marketing is a peer-reviewed academic journal that publishes papers four times a year in the field of Management. The journal's editor is Brian D Smith. It has been in publication since 2000 and is currently published by SAGE Publications.

== Scope ==
The Journal of Medical Marketing publishes a range of practice papers, research articles and professional briefings written by experts in the industry. The journal contains articles that focus on the issues of key importance to medical marketers. The journal is primarily aimed at those in association with a company which may produce pharmaceuticals, medical devices or diagnostic equipment for the medical industry.

== Abstracting and indexing ==
The Journal of Medical Marketing is abstracted and indexed in the following databases:

- ABI/INFORM
- Business Source Complete
- Business Source Corporate
- Current Abstracts – EBSCO
- SCOPUS
- TOC Premier – EBSCO
