= Acalvaria =

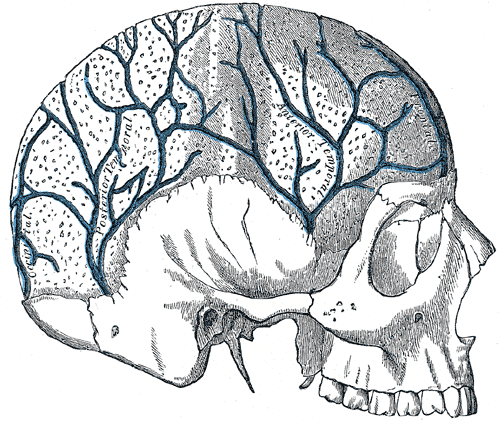
- Specialty: Medical genetics

Acalvaria is a rare malformation consisting of the absence of the calvarial bones, dura mater and associated muscles in the presence of a normal skull base and normal facial bones. The central nervous system is usually unaffected. The presumed pathogenesis of acalvaria is the faulty migration of the membranous neurocranium with normal placement of the embryonic ectoderm, resulting in the absence of the calvaria, but with an intact layer of skin over the brain parenchyma. In other words, instead of having a skull cap protecting the brain, there is only skin covering it. The size of the area that is missing the skull cap can vary from case to case. In extreme cases, the entire top part of the cranium that is dome-shaped may be absent.

== Signs and symptoms ==
There are four main signs of acalvaria: absence of the flat bones of the cranial vault, absence of the dura mater and muscles associated with it, skull abnormalities, and the absence of a skull cap. This condition can be diagnosed prior to birth using ultrasonography. Physicians often use magnetic resonance imaging to confirm the diagnosis because in utero, acalvaria is sometimes confused with anencephaly or encephalocele. A distinguishable difference is that with anencephaly, the cerebral hemispheres are missing, but with acalvaria, all parts of the cerebrum are usually present and developed, whereas parts of the calvarium are missing.

== Pathogenesis ==
Currently there is no identified cause of acalvaria. The primary presumed pathogenesis is problematic migration of the membranous neurocranium with respect to the normal positioning of the immature ectoderm. When an embryo develops normally, the anterior neural pore closes about the fourth week. After this occurs, mesenchymal tissue migrates under the ectoderm. This ectoderm underlies where the cerebral hemisphere will eventually be. When a fetus has acalvaria, the embryonic ectoderm is in its correct place, but the mesenchymal migration does not occur correctly. Therefore, acalvaria is considered to be a postneurulation defect. Because it is a postneurulation defect, it must develop after embryonic stage 11, between 24 and 26 days after conception.

ACE inhibitors and angiotensin II receptor antagonists are reported to cause prenatal hypocalvaria.

== Treatment ==
Because this malformation is rare and there are extremely few individuals living with this condition, treatment is limited. Treatment consists of carefully managing the condition in a controlled manner. Proceeding with a bone graft when the child reaches school age is also recommended.

== Prognosis ==
Usually babies with this malformation do not survive past birth. However, there have been cases of survival. As of 2004, there were only two reported living cases. Of these two, one was severely cognitively impaired and physically disabled. The status of the other was unreported. If the fetus progresses to full term there is the risk that it will have head trauma from the pressure applied to the head while being delivered. A few other cases of acalvaria have been reported that did not progress to birth. In addition to the lack of the skull cap, there were brain malformations in each case and all the pregnancies were terminated either electively or the fetuses were spontaneously aborted.

== Epidemiology ==
Acalvaria usually occurs in less than 1 of every 100,000 births. By way of epidemiological data, it is thought that females are more prone to have this defect. Currently, acalvaria is not thought to have much of a risk of recurrence.

== See also ==
- Anencephaly
