= Spatial and Spatio-temporal Epidemiology =

- Discipline: Epidemiology
- Language: English
- Edited by: Andrew Lawson

Publication details
- History: 2009–present
- Publisher: Elsevier
- Frequency: Quarterly
- Open access: Hybrid

Standard abbreviations
- ISO 4: Spat. Spatio-temporal Epidemiol.

Indexing
- ISSN: 1877-5845
- LCCN: 2010208627
- OCLC no.: 502318218

Links
- Journal homepage; Online archive

Spatial and Spatio-temporal Epidemiology is a quarterly peer-reviewed medical journal covering spatial and spatiotemporal aspects of epidemiology. It was established in 2009 and is published by Elsevier. The editor-in-chief is Andrew Lawson (Medical University of South Carolina).

== Abstracting and indexing ==
The journal is abstracted and indexed in:

- EBSCOhost
- Embase
- Index Medicus/MEDLINE/PubMed
- Scopus
