= Journal of Healthcare Management =

Bimonthly peer-reviewed academic journal

- Discipline: Healthcare management
- Language: English
- Edited by: Eric Ford

Publication details
- Former name(s): Hospital Administration; Hospital & Health Services Administration
- History: 1956–present
- Publisher: Lippincott Williams & Wilkins on behalf of American College of Healthcare Executives (United States)
- Frequency: Bimonthly
- Impact factor: 1.102 (2017)

Standard abbreviations
- ISO 4: J. Healthc. Manag.

Indexing
- Journal of Healthcare Management
- CODEN: JHMAFB
- ISSN: 1096-9012
- LCCN: 98657638
- OCLC no.: 37958297
- Hospital & Health Services Administration
- ISSN: 8750-3735 (print); 1944-7396 (web)
- Hospital Administration
- ISSN: 0018-5523

Links
- Journal homepage

The Journal of Healthcare Management is a bimonthly peer-reviewed academic journal covering management in health care. It is published by Lippincott Williams & Wilkins on behalf of the American College of Healthcare Executives. Each issue prints an interview with a leading healthcare executive.

The journal was established in 1956 as Hospital Administration, and was renamed Hospital & Health Services Administration in 1976. It took its current name in 1998.

== Abstracting and Indexing ==
The journal is indexed and abstracted in the following bibliographic databases:

- ABI/INFORM
- Academic Search Premier
- Business Source Elite
- Business Source Premier
- CINAHL
- Embase
- MEDLINE
- Public Affairs Index
- Scopus
- Social Sciences Citation Index

According to the Journal Citation Reports, the journal has a 2017 impact factor of 1.102.
