= Journal of Communication in Healthcare =

Healthcare journal

- Discipline: Health communication
- Language: English
- Edited by: Renata Schiavo

Publication details
- History: 2008–present
- Publisher: Taylor & Francis
- Frequency: 5/year
- Open access: Hybrid Open Select
- Impact factor: 2.0 (2025)

Standard abbreviations
- ISO 4: J. Commun. Healthc.

Indexing
- CODEN: JCHOCO
- ISSN: 1753-8068 (print); 1753-8076 (web)
- LCCN: 2009228751
- OCLC no.: 465694682

Links
- Journal homepage; Online access; Online archive

The Journal of Communication in Healthcare: Strategies, Media, and Engagement in Global Health is a peer-reviewed journal covering the field of health communication across the intersecting fields of healthcare, public health, global health, and medicine. It is published by Taylor & Francis and the editor-in-chief is Renata Schiavo (Columbia University Mailman School of Public Health; Health Equity Initiative; and Strategies for Equity and Communication Impact).

== Abstracting and indexing ==
The journal is abstracted and indexed in:

- CAB Abstracts
- Chemical Abstracts Service
- CINAHL
- EBSCO databases
- Index Medicus/MEDLINE/PubMed
- Scopus
- Web of Science
