= Drug Design, Development and Therapy =

- Discipline: Drug development
- Language: English
- Edited by: Professor Frank Boekler

Publication details
- History: 2007–present
- Publisher: Dove Medical Press
- Open access: Yes
- Impact factor: 5.1 (2024)

Standard abbreviations
- ISO 4: Drug Des. Dev. Ther.
- NLM: Drug Des Devel Ther

Indexing
- ISSN: 1177-8881
- OCLC no.: 502420997

Links
- Journal homepage; Online Access - Volume 19 (2025)

Drug Design, Development and Therapy is an open access peer-reviewed medical journal covering research on drug design and development through to clinical applications. The journal was established in 2007 and is published by Dove Medical Press.

The journal covers research on drug design and development through to clinical applications, serving pharmaceutical chemists, clinicians, and principal investigators in both academic and industrial settings. They publish application notes, reviews, original research articles, and clinical studies across therapeutic areas, with emphasis on drug discovery, molecular and computer-aided design, biologically active compounds, biotechnology, natural products, pharmacokinetics, drug delivery, preclinical and translational studies, toxicology, advanced therapies, personalized medicine, and clinical evaluation. Particular focus is placed on clinical outcomes, patient safety, and the effective and sustained use of medicines.

This journal subscribes to the principles of the Committee on Publication Ethics.
