= British Journal of Occupational Therapy =

- Discipline: Occupational therapy
- Language: English

Publication details
- Former name: Occupational Therapy
- History: 1950-present
- Publisher: SAGE Publications on behalf of the Royal College of Occupational Therapists (United Kingdom)
- Frequency: Monthly
- Impact factor: 0.636 (2014)

Standard abbreviations
- ISO 4: Br. J. Occup. Ther.

Indexing
- ISSN: 0308-0226 (print); 1477-6006 (web)
- LCCN: sn79006296
- OCLC no.: 883966117

Links
- Journal homepage; Online access; Online archive

The British Journal of Occupational Therapy is a monthly peer-reviewed medical journal covering occupational therapy. It is published by SAGE Publications on behalf of the Royal College of Occupational Therapists. The journal was established in 1938 as the journal of the Association of Occupational Therapists, obtaining its current title in 1974.
