= European Health Management Association =

The European Health Management Association (EHMA) was established in 1982 and is a non-profit membership organisation. Its focus is on health management capacity and capabilities and on supporting the implementation of health policy and practice.

== About ==
EHMA is a forum for health policy makers who need to network and share information and intelligence in a rapidly changing health sector; senior health managers who need an international and inter-sectoral network to develop their capacity to deliver health services; programme directors of health management programmes, who need an international forum to develop their programmes; and academic institutions and research organisations who can exchange experience and learning among their peers across Europe.

It is the only European membership organisation focusing on health management in the health sector.

EHMA represents the interests of members on a wide range of European Commission working groups and committees, including the European Health Policy Forum and the Commission Working Group on Patient Safety and Quality. EHMA has also been involved as project leader or participant in a wide range of European Commission funded research projects and studies in public health.

== Members ==
EHMA has two different types of membership: individual and organizational. The organizational members are represented by healthcare providers, universities, research institutions, health policy bodies and government ministries. Currently, it has 73 members from over 20 countries in the WHO region, bringing together the management, policy and research communities.

=== Board members ===
The EHMA Board sits at the heart of the Governance process and board members play a pivotal role in helping to shape the strategy and to oversee the delivery of the work programme. Board positions are open to all Members and are elected during the Annual General Assembly.

=== Scientific Advisory Committee ===
The role of the Scientific Advisory Committee (SAC) is to support the wider mission of EHMA, specifically providing the EHMA Board with advice on research and scientific issues. The SAC plays an important role in providing a focus for and voice for EHMA's research community, and in raising awareness of research within EHMA. Moreover, the SAC provides scientific advice and review input to planning for the Annual Conference. SAC Members are appointed by the EHMA Board for a period of 3 years.

=== Young Advisory Committee ===
The EHMA Young Advisory Committee (YAC) has been working on the Young EHMA network for the past years. The aim of the Young EHMA network is to offer a forum for early career professionals in health management to interact with peers about topics of interest, shared experiences, and career needs.

== Projects ==
The European Health Management Association is involved in several of Europe's research projects following a history in managing and participating in numerous research projects, often supported by European Commission programmes. EHMA's main expertise relates not only to project management, but also to dissemination of research results – in particular 'knowledge transfer', in which the dialogue between researchers and targets group are central, is according to EHMA a key issue in strengthening both the validity of the research as well as the dissemination of results. Related to this dialogue, EHMA recognizes the actual impact of research result and the practical reality on the shop floor as a key issue.

Themes of past projects have included access to healthcare, the "basket" of services available to patients and the legal aspects of eHealth.

The complete list is below:

- CARMEN Network (2001-2004)
- HealthACCESS (2004-2006)
- HealthBASKET (2004-2007)
- Legally eHealth: Study on Legal and Regulatory Aspects of eHealth (2006)
- SHARE: Making IT Work for Health (2006-2008)
- HealthQuest (2007-2008)
- HEALTH PROMeTHEUS: Health Professional Mobility in the European Union Study (2009-2012)
- EPAAC - European Partnership for Action Against Cancer (2009-2014)
- Developing Public Health Capacity in the EU (2010)
- PROGRESS (2012)
- IBenC (2013-2017) – Identifying best practices for care-dependent elderly by Benchmarking Costs and outcomes of community care
- PALANTE - PAtient Leading and mANaging their healThcare through EHealth Project (2012-2015)
- PaSQ - Joint Action on Patient Safety and Quality of Care (2012-2015)
- Momentum - European Momentum for Mainstreaming Telemedicine Deployment in Daily Practice (2012-2014)
- ENGAGED (2013-2015)
- SEPEN (2017 to 2021) - EU Joint Action on Health Workforce Planning
- CHRODIS - identify, validate, exchange and disseminate good practice on chronic diseases across EU Member States
- EIPAHA - European Innovation Partnership on Active and Healthy Ageing
- IC-Health – Improving digital health literacy in Europe
- SUSTAIN (2014-2020) – Sustainable integrated care for older people in Europe

== EHMA Annual Conference ==
EHMA has hosted an annual scientific conference] every year since 1982, every year the location and the topic changes. It brings together for provocative discussions not only EHMA members, but healthcare professionals, policy makers and industry representatives.

== EHMA Journal - Health Services Management Research ==
Health Services Management Research is an authoritative international peer-reviewed journal which exists to publish theoretically and empirically rigorous research on questions of enduring interest and concern to health-care organizations and systems throughout the world.
