= Dove Medical Press =

Academic publisher

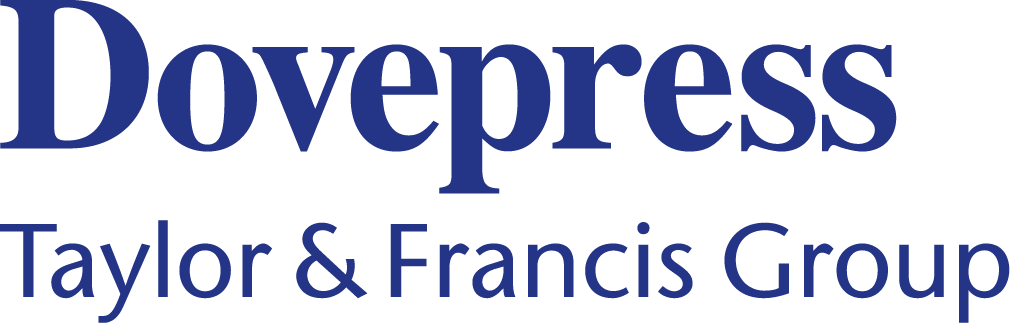
- Status: Active
- Founded: 2003
- Country of origin: United Kingdom
- Headquarters location: Macclesfield, Cheshire, England
- Distribution: Worldwide
- Key people: Tim Hill, Publisher
- Nonfiction topics: Science and medicine
- Official website: www.dovepress.com

Dove Medical Press is an academic publisher of open-access peer-reviewed scientific and medical journals, with offices in Macclesfield, London (United Kingdom); Princeton, New Jersey (United States); and Auckland (New Zealand). In September 2017, Dove Medical Press was acquired by the Taylor & Francis Group.

As an open access publisher, Dove charges a publication fee to authors or their institutions or funders. This charge allows Dove to recover its editorial and production costs and to create a pool of funds that can be used to provide fee waivers for authors from lesser developed countries. Articles published are available via an interface following the Open Archives Initiative Protocol for Metadata Harvesting, a set of uniform standards promulgated by the Open Archives Initiative allowing metadata on archive holdings.

Dove is a member of the Association of Learned and Professional Society Publishers, the Committee on Publication Ethics, and the Open Archives Initiative. As of March 2019, it published a total of 135 journals, although 43 have now ceased publication. In 2012, the company was included on Beall's List of predatory open-access publishers, was later removed, but was again included in this list in 2015.

== History ==
Dove Medical Press is a privately held company founded in 2003 by Tim Hill, a former managing director of Adis International and five other founders.

As of 11 April 2013, 42 of the 131 journals were indexed in PubMed, while 30 of the 131 journals had fewer than ten articles.

In 2013, the Dove Medical Press journal Drug Design, Development and Therapy accepted a false and intentionally flawed paper created and submitted by an investigative journalist for Science as part of a "sting" to test the effectiveness of the peer-review processes of open access journals (Who's Afraid of Peer Review?). The Open Access Scholarly Publishers Association terminated Dove's membership as a result of the incident. After satisfying The Open Access Scholarly Publishers Association Membership Committee that new editorial and peer review procedures were in place to address the concerns raised during its investigation, Dove Medical Press was reinstated as a full member of Open Access Scholarly Publishers Association in September 2015.

In September 2017, Dove Medical Press was acquired by the Taylor & Francis Group.

In 2022, a study re-analyzing the predatory publishers on Beall's list found that Dove Medical Press was among the "most reputable" of 18 publishers previously labelled as predatory, which could have marked a "transition into a reputable, open-access journal".

== Copyright ==
All articles, including metadata and supplementary files, are published under the Creative Commons Attribution license (CC BY-NC or CC BY).

== See also ==
- List of Dove Medical Press academic journals
