= Frontiers =

Frontiers may refer to:

- Frontier, areas near or beyond a boundary

== Arts and entertainment ==
=== Music ===
- Frontiers (Journey album), 1983
- Frontiers (Jermaine Jackson album), 1978
- Frontiers (Jesse Cook album), 2007
- Frontiers (Psycho le Cemu album), 2003
- "Frontiers", a song by Omnium Gatherum from Grey Heavens
- "Frontiers", a song by Symphony X from The Odyssey
- Frontiers Records, an Italian record label

=== Other uses in arts and entertainment ===
- Frontier(s), a 2007 horror film
- Frontiers (2023 film), a Canadian drama film
- Frontiers (magazine), an LGBT magazine
- Frontiers (1989 TV series), a 1989 British documentary series that aired on the BBC
- Frontiers (1996 TV series), a 1996 British crime drama that aired on ITV
- Sonic Frontiers, a 2022 video game

== Science and academia ==
=== Frontiers in... series of journals ===
- Frontiers Media, publisher of the Frontiers in... series of 59 journals
- Frontiers in Endocrinology
- Frontiers in Plant Science
- Frontiers in Psychology
- Frontiers in Physics
- Frontiers for Young Minds, not part of the series proper

=== Publications from Karger Publishers ===
- Frontiers in Diabetes
- Frontiers of Gastrointestinal Research
- Frontiers of Hormone Research
- Frontiers of Matrix Biology
- Frontiers of Neurology and Neuroscience
- Frontiers of Oral Biology
- Frontiers of Oral Physiology
- Frontiers of Radiation Therapy and Oncology

=== Journals published by Higher Education Press ===
- Frontiers of Agricultural Science and Engineering
- Frontiers of Architectural Research
- Frontiers in Biology
- Frontiers of Business Research in China
- Frontiers of Chemical Science and Engineering
- Frontiers of Computer Science
- Frontiers of Earth Science
- Frontiers of Economics in China
- Frontiers of Education in China
- Frontiers in Energy
- Frontiers of Engineering Management
- Frontiers of Environmental Science & Engineering
- Frontiers of History in China
- Frontiers of Law in China
- Frontiers of Literary Studies in China
- Frontiers of Materials Science
- Frontiers of Mathematics in China
- Frontiers of Mechanical Engineering
- Frontiers of Medicine
- Frontiers of Optoelectronics
- Frontiers of Philosophy in China
- Frontiers of Physics
- Frontiers of Structural and Civil Engineering, formerly Frontiers of Architecture and Civil Engineering in China
- Landscape Architecture Frontiers

=== Other publications ===
- Frontiers (PPARC magazine), a scientific magazine published by the Particle Physics and Astronomy Research Council
- Frontiers: The Interdisciplinary Journal of Study Abroad, the official publication of the Forum on Education Abroad
- Frontiers: A Journal of Women Studies, a triannual academic journal on women's studies
- Frontiers in Applied Mathematics, published by SIAM
- Frontiers in Bioscience published by the Frontiers in Bioscience organization
- Frontiers of Biogeography, published by the International Biogeography Society
- Frontiers in Ecology and the Environment, published by the Ecological Society of America
- Frontiers of Information Technology & Electronic Engineering, published by Springer
- Frontiers of Medical and Biological Engineering, published by Brill
- Frontiers in Neuroendocrinology, published by Elsevier
- Frontiers of Sanitation, published at the Institute of Development Studies
- Frontiers in Zoology, published by BioMed Central
- Frontiers journal series published by the Chinese Chemical Society and the Royal Society of Chemistry

== See also ==
- Frontier (disambiguation)
