= List of China studies journals =

List of academic journals about China
- National emblem of the People's Republic of China
- Subject: China; Sinology
- Scope: Academic journals
- Period covered: Early China to the present
- Related: Bibliography of Chinese history

This is a list of academic journals about China: journals that focus on China or carry substantial content about China, covering every period from early China to the present day.

Journals listed here are peer-reviewed or edited by recognized scholars and are published by a university press, an academic publisher or a learned society. Entries follow APA style for a periodical as a whole, (Note: Entries are in plain text APA 7 format without templates; templates are used only for identifiers and notes.) giving the year of first publication, including under earlier titles where a journal has been renamed; former titles and their dates are given in a note. Print and online ISSNs are given where both exist.

== General and multidisciplinary China studies ==
- American Journal of Chinese Studies. (1992–present). American Association for Chinese Studies. ISSN 2166-0042 (print). Official website. Archive: JSTOR.
- China: An International Journal. (2003–present). NUS Press. ISSN 0219-7472 (print), ISSN 0219-8614 (online). Official website. Archive: Project MUSE.
- China News Analysis. (1953–1998). China News Analysis (Hong Kong); Fu Jen Catholic University (Taiwan, 1994–1998). Official archive.
- China Information. (1986–present). SAGE. ISSN 0920-203X (print), ISSN 1741-590X (online). Official website.
- The China Journal. (Note: Published as The Australian Journal of Chinese Affairs (1979–1995).) (1979–present). University of Chicago Press. ISSN 1324-9347 (print), ISSN 1835-8535 (online). Official website. Archive: JSTOR; JSTOR (as The Australian Journal of Chinese Affairs).
- China Perspectives. (1995–present). French Centre for Research on Contemporary China. ISSN 2070-3449 (print), ISSN 1996-4617 (online). Official website. Archive: JSTOR.
- The China Quarterly. (1960–present). Cambridge University Press. ISSN 0305-7410 (print), ISSN 1468-2648 (online). Official website. Archive: JSTOR.
- China Report. (1964–present). SAGE. ISSN 0009-4455 (print), ISSN 0973-063X (online). Official website.
- The China Review. (2001–present). Chinese University of Hong Kong Press. ISSN 1680-2012 (print). Official website. Archive: JSTOR; Project MUSE.
- Chinese Studies International. (Note: Published as China Review International (1994–2020).) (1994–present). University of Hawaiʻi Press. ISSN 2996-8593 (online). Official website. Archive: JSTOR (as China Review International); Project MUSE.
- Contemporary China Review. (2020–present). Bouden House. ISSN 2765-9143 (Chinese edition), ISSN 2767-679X (English print), ISSN 2767-6803 (English online). Official website.
- Études chinoises. (1983–present). Presses de l'Inalco. ISSN 0755-5857 (print). Official website.
- Issues & Studies. (1964–present). World Scientific. ISSN 1013-2511 (print), ISSN 2529-802X (online). Official website.
- Journal of Chinese Humanities. (2015–present). Brill. ISSN 2352-1333 (print), ISSN 2352-1341 (online). Official website.
- Journal of Contemporary China. (1992–present). Routledge. ISSN 1067-0564 (print), ISSN 1469-9400 (online). Official website.
- Journal of Current Chinese Affairs. (Note: Published as China aktuell (1972–2008).) (1972–present). SAGE. ISSN 1868-1026 (print), ISSN 1868-4874 (online). Official website.
- Modern China. (1975–present). SAGE. ISSN 0097-7004 (print), ISSN 1552-6836 (online). Official website. Archive: JSTOR.
- Modern China Studies. (1990–present). Center for Modern China. ISSN 2160-0295 (print), ISSN 2160-0317 (online). Official website.
- Monumenta Serica. (1935–present). Routledge. ISSN 0254-9948 (print), ISSN 2057-1690 (online). Official website. Archive: JSTOR.
- Oriens Extremus. (1954–present). Harrassowitz. ISSN 0030-5197 (print), ISSN 2940-438X (online). Official website. Archive: JSTOR.
- T'oung Pao. (1890–present). Brill. ISSN 0082-5433 (print), ISSN 1568-5322 (online). Official website. Archive: JSTOR.

== Asian and East Asian studies ==
- Asian Survey. (1961–present). University of California Press. ISSN 0004-4687 (print), ISSN 1533-838X (online). Official website. Archive: JSTOR.
- Harvard Journal of Asiatic Studies. (1936–present). Harvard–Yenching Institute. ISSN 0073-0548 (print), ISSN 1944-6454 (online). Official website. Archive: JSTOR; Project MUSE.
- The Journal of Asian Studies. (Note: Published as The Far Eastern Quarterly (1941–1956).) (1941–present). Duke University Press. ISSN 0021-9118 (print), ISSN 1752-0401 (online). Official website. Archive: JSTOR; JSTOR (as The Far Eastern Quarterly).
- Journal of East Asian Studies. (2001–present). Cambridge University Press. ISSN 1598-2408 (print), ISSN 2234-6643 (online). Official website. Archive: JSTOR.
- Pacific Affairs. (1928–present). Taylor & Francis. ISSN 0030-851X (print), ISSN 1715-3379 (online). Official website. Archive: JSTOR.
- Positions: Asia Critique. (1993–present). Duke University Press. ISSN 1067-9847 (print), ISSN 1527-8271 (online). Official website. Archive: Project MUSE.

== History ==
=== General and all periods ===
- Asia Major. (1988–present). Institute of History and Philology, Academia Sinica. ISSN 0004-4482 (print). Third series; earlier series ran 1923–1934 and 1949–1975. Official website. Archive: JSTOR.
- Chinese Annals of History of Science and Technology. (2017–present). Science Press. ISSN 2096-4226 (print). Official website.
- The Chinese Repository. (1832–1851). Printed for the proprietors (Canton). Archive: Online Books Page.
- The Chinese Historical Review. (Note: Published as The Historians (1987–1988) and The Chinese Historians (1989–2003).) (1987–present). Routledge. ISSN 1547-402X (print), ISSN 2048-7827 (online). Official website.
- Chinese Studies in History. (Note: Published as Chinese Studies in History and Philosophy (1967–1968).) (1967–present). Routledge. ISSN 0009-4633 (print), ISSN 1558-0407 (online). Official website.
- Frontiers of History in China. (2006–present). Higher Education Press. ISSN 1673-3401 (print), ISSN 1673-3525 (online). Official website.
- Journal of Asian History. (1967–present). Harrassowitz. ISSN 0021-910X (print), ISSN 2747-4267 (online). Official website. Archive: JSTOR.
- Journal of Chinese History. (2017–present). Cambridge University Press. ISSN 2059-1632 (print), ISSN 2059-1640 (online). Official website.
- Journal of Chinese Military History. (2012–present). Brill. ISSN 2212-7445 (print), ISSN 2212-7453 (online). Official website.
- Nan Nü: Men, Women and Gender in China. (Note: Published as Nan Nü: Men, Women and Gender in Early and Imperial China (1999–2003).) (1999–present). Brill. ISSN 1387-6805 (print), ISSN 1568-5268 (online). Official website.

=== Early and imperial China ===
- Early China. (1975–present). Cambridge University Press. ISSN 0362-5028 (print), ISSN 2325-2324 (online). Official website. Archive: JSTOR.
- Journal of Song-Yuan Studies. (Note: Published as Sung Studies Newsletter (1970–1977), Bulletin of Sung and Yüan Studies (1978–1989) and Journal of Sung-Yuan Studies (1990–2000).) (1970–present). Johns Hopkins University Press. ISSN 1059-3152 (print), ISSN 2154-6665 (online). Official website. Archive: JSTOR; JSTOR (as Bulletin of Sung and Yüan Studies); JSTOR (as Sung Studies Newsletter); Project MUSE.
- Late Imperial China. (Note: Published as Ch'ing-shih wen-t'i (1965–1984).) (1965–present). Johns Hopkins University Press. ISSN 0884-3236 (print), ISSN 1086-3257 (online). Official website. Archive: Project MUSE.
- Ming Qing Yanjiu. (1992–present). Brill. ISSN 1724-8574 (print), ISSN 2468-4791 (online). Official website.
- Ming Studies. (1975–present). Routledge. ISSN 0147-037X (print), ISSN 1759-7595 (online). Official website.
- Tang Studies. (1982–present). Johns Hopkins University Press. ISSN 0737-5034 (print), ISSN 1759-7633 (online). Official website. Archive: Project MUSE.

=== Modern and twentieth-century China ===
- Journal of Modern Chinese History. (2007–present). Routledge. ISSN 1753-5654 (print), ISSN 1753-5662 (online). Official website.
- Twentieth-Century China. (Note: Published as Chinese Republican Studies Newsletter (1975–1983) and Republican China (1983–1997).) (1975–present). Johns Hopkins University Press. ISSN 1521-5385 (print), ISSN 1940-5065 (online). Official website. Archive: Project MUSE.

== Politics, law, and international relations ==
- China International Strategy Review. (2019–present). Springer Nature. ISSN 2524-5627 (print), ISSN 2524-5635 (online). Official website.
- China Legal Science. (2013–present). China Legal Science Journals Press. ISSN 2095-4867 (print). Official website.
- The China Quarterly of International Strategic Studies. (2015–present). World Scientific. ISSN 2377-7400 (print), ISSN 2377-7419 (online). Official website.
- Chinese Journal of International Law. (2002–present). Oxford University Press. ISSN 1540-1650 (print), ISSN 1746-9937 (online). Official website.
- The Chinese Journal of International Politics. (2006–present). Oxford University Press. ISSN 1750-8916 (print), ISSN 1750-8924 (online). Official website. Archive: JSTOR.
- Chinese Law & Government. (1968–present). Routledge. ISSN 0009-4609 (print), ISSN 1944-7051 (online). Official website.
- Frontiers of Law in China. (2006–present). Higher Education Press. ISSN 1673-3428 (print), ISSN 1673-3541 (online). Official website.
- Journal of Chinese Governance. (2016–present). Routledge. ISSN 2381-2346 (print), ISSN 2381-2354 (online). Official website.
- Journal of Chinese Political Science. (1995–present). Springer. ISSN 1080-6954 (print), ISSN 1874-6357 (online). Official website.

== Economics and business ==
- China & World Economy. (1993–present). Wiley. ISSN 1671-2234 (print), ISSN 1749-124X (online). Official website.
- China Agricultural Economic Review. (2009–present). Emerald. ISSN 1756-137X (print), ISSN 1756-1388 (online). Official website.
- China Economic Journal. (2008–present). Routledge. ISSN 1753-8963 (print), ISSN 1753-8971 (online). Official website.
- China Economic Quarterly International. (2021–present). KeAi. ISSN 2666-9331 (online). Official website.
- China Economic Review. (1989–present). Elsevier. ISSN 1043-951X (print), ISSN 1873-7781 (online). Official website.
- The Chinese Economy. (Note: Published as Chinese Economic Studies (1967–1996).) (1967–present). Routledge. ISSN 1097-1475 (print), ISSN 1558-0954 (online). Official website.
- Chinese Management Studies. (2007–present). Emerald. ISSN 1750-614X (print), ISSN 1750-6158 (online). Official website.
- Journal of Chinese Economic and Business Studies. (2003–present). Routledge. ISSN 1476-5284 (print), ISSN 1476-5292 (online). Official website.
- Management and Organization Review. (2005–present). Cambridge University Press. ISSN 1740-8776 (print), ISSN 1740-8784 (online). Official website.

== Society, education, and communication ==
- China Journal of Social Work. (2008–present). Routledge. ISSN 1752-5098 (print), ISSN 1752-5101 (online). Official website.
- China Population and Development Studies. (2017–present). Springer Nature. ISSN 2096-448X (print), ISSN 2523-8965 (online). Official website.
- Chinese Education & Society. (Note: Published as Chinese Education (1968–1992).) (1968–present). Routledge. ISSN 1061-1932 (print), ISSN 1944-7116 (online). Official website.
- Chinese Journal of Communication. (2008–present). Routledge. ISSN 1754-4750 (print), ISSN 1754-4769 (online). Official website.
- Chinese Journal of Sociology. (2015–present). SAGE. ISSN 2057-150X (print), ISSN 2057-1518 (online). Official website.
- Chinese Sociological Review. (Note: Published as Chinese Sociology and Anthropology (1968–2011).) (1968–present). Routledge. ISSN 2162-0555 (print), ISSN 2162-0563 (online). Official website.
- Global Media and China. (2016–present). SAGE. ISSN 2059-4364 (print), ISSN 2059-4372 (online). Official website.
- Journal of Chinese Overseas. (2005–present). Brill. ISSN 1793-0391 (print), ISSN 1793-2548 (online). Official website. Archive: Project MUSE.
- The Journal of Chinese Sociology. (2014–present). Springer Nature. ISSN 2198-2635 (online). Official website.

== Religion and philosophy ==
- Dao: A Journal of Comparative Philosophy. (2001–present). Springer. ISSN 1540-3009 (print), ISSN 1569-7274 (online). Official website.
- Frontiers of Philosophy in China. (2006–present). Higher Education Press. ISSN 1673-3436 (print), ISSN 1673-355X (online). Official website. Archive: JSTOR.
- Journal of Chinese Philosophy. (1973–present). Brill. ISSN 0301-8121 (print), ISSN 1540-6253 (online). Official website.
- Journal of Chinese Religions. (Note: Published as Bulletin of the Society for the Study of Chinese Religions (1977–1981).) (1982–present). Johns Hopkins University Press. ISSN 0737-769X (print), ISSN 2050-8999 (online). Official website. Archive: Project MUSE.
- Journal of Daoist Studies. (2008–present). Three Pines Press. ISSN 1941-5516 (print), ISSN 1941-5524 (online). Official website. Archive: Project MUSE.
- Philosophy East and West. (1951–present). University of Hawaiʻi Press. ISSN 0031-8221 (print), ISSN 1529-1898 (online). Official website. Archive: JSTOR; Project MUSE.
- Studies in Chinese Religions. (2015–present). Routledge. ISSN 2372-9988 (print), ISSN 2372-9996 (online). Official website.

== Literature ==
- Chinese Literature and Thought Today. (Note: Published as Chinese Studies in Philosophy (1969–1997) and Contemporary Chinese Thought (1997–2021). Merged with Chinese Literature Today (2010–2021) in 2022.) (1969–present). Routledge. ISSN 2768-3524 (print), ISSN 2768-3532 (online). Official website.
- Chinese Literature: Essays, Articles, Reviews. (1979–present). Coda Press. ISSN 0161-9705 (print), ISSN 2330-4901 (online). Official website. Archive: JSTOR.
- CHINOPERL: Journal of Chinese Oral and Performing Literature. (Note: Published as CHINOPERL News (1969–1975) and CHINOPERL Papers (1976–2012).) (1969–present). University of Hawaiʻi Press. ISSN 2835-317X (print), ISSN 2835-3188 (online). Official website. Archive: Project MUSE.
- Frontiers of Literary Studies in China. (2007–present). Higher Education Press. ISSN 1673-7318 (print), ISSN 1673-7423 (online). Official website.
- Journal of Chinese Literature and Culture. (2014–present). Duke University Press. ISSN 2329-0048 (print), ISSN 2329-0056 (online). Official website. Archive: Project MUSE.
- Modern Chinese Literature and Culture. (Note: Published as Modern Chinese Literature (1984–1998).) (1984–present). Edinburgh University Press. ISSN 1520-9857 (print), ISSN 2328-966X (online). Official website. Archive: JSTOR.
- Prism: Theory and Modern Chinese Literature. (Note: Published as Journal of Modern Literature in Chinese (1997–2018).) (1997–present). Duke University Press. ISSN 2578-3491 (print), ISSN 2578-3505 (online). Official website.

== Language and linguistics ==
- Chinese as a Second Language. (Note: Published as Journal of the Chinese Language Teachers Association (1966–2015).) (1966–present). John Benjamins. ISSN 2451-828X (print), ISSN 2451-8298 (online). Official website.
- Chinese Language and Discourse. (2010–present). John Benjamins. ISSN 1877-7031 (print), ISSN 1877-8798 (online). Official website.
- International Journal of Chinese Linguistics. (2014–present). John Benjamins. ISSN 2213-8706 (print), ISSN 2213-8714 (online). Official website.
- Journal of Chinese Linguistics. (1973–present). Chinese University of Hong Kong Press. ISSN 0091-3723 (print), ISSN 2411-3484 (online). Official website. Archive: JSTOR; Project MUSE.
- Journal of Chinese Writing Systems. (2017–present). SAGE. ISSN 2513-8502 (print), ISSN 2513-8510 (online). Official website.
- Sino-Platonic Papers. (1986–present). University of Pennsylvania. ISSN 2157-9679 (print), ISSN 2157-9687 (online). Official website and archive.

== Art and film ==
- Archives of Asian Art. (Note: Published as Archives of the Chinese Art Society of America (1945–1965).) (1945–present). Duke University Press. ISSN 0066-6637 (print), ISSN 1944-6497 (online). Official website. Archive: JSTOR; JSTOR (as Archives of the Chinese Art Society of America); Project MUSE.
- Artibus Asiae. (1925–present). Museum Rietberg Zurich. ISSN 0004-3648 (print), ISSN 2296-4215 (online). Official website. Archive: JSTOR.
- Journal of Chinese Cinemas. (2007–present). Routledge. ISSN 1750-8061 (print), ISSN 1750-807X (online). Official website.
- Journal of Chinese Film Studies. (2021–present). De Gruyter Brill. ISSN 2702-2277 (print), ISSN 2702-2285 (online). Official website.
- Journal of Contemporary Chinese Art. (2014–present). Intellect. ISSN 2051-7041 (print), ISSN 2051-705X (online). Official website.

== Archaeology ==
- Archaeological Research in Asia. (2015–present). Elsevier. ISSN 2352-2267 (print), ISSN 2352-2275 (online). Official website.
- Asian Archaeology. (2013–present). Springer Nature. ISSN 2520-8098 (print), ISSN 2520-8101 (online). Official website.
- Chinese Archaeology. (2001–present). De Gruyter Brill. ISSN 2160-5025 (print), ISSN 2160-5068 (online). Official website.
- Chinese Cultural Relics. (2014–present). East View Press. ISSN 2330-5150 (print), ISSN 2330-5169 (online). Official website.

== Regional studies ==
=== Hong Kong ===
- Hong Kong Studies. (2018–present). Chinese University of Hong Kong Press. ISSN 2618-0502 (print), ISSN 2618-0510 (online). Official website.
- Hong Kong Law Journal. (1971–present). Sweet & Maxwell. ISSN 0378-0600 (print). Official website.
- Journal of the Royal Asiatic Society Hong Kong. (Note: Published as Journal of the Hong Kong Branch of the Royal Asiatic Society (1961–2003) and, from 2004, Journal of the Royal Asiatic Society Hong Kong Branch.) (1961–present). Royal Asiatic Society Hong Kong. ISSN 1991-7295 (print), ISSN 2617-3239 (online). Official website. Archive: JSTOR; JSTOR (as Journal of the Hong Kong Branch of the Royal Asiatic Society).

=== Tibet ===
- Bulletin of Tibetology. (1964–present). Namgyal Institute of Tibetology. ISSN 0525-1516 (print). Official website.
- China Tibetology. (2003–present). China Tibetology Research Center. ISSN 1671-6043 (print).
- Journal of Tibetan Literature. (2022–present). Tsadra Foundation; Buddhist Digital Resource Center. ISSN 2834-2801 (online). Official website.
- Revue d'Études Tibétaines. (2002–present). CNRS. ISSN 1768-2959 (online). Online edition (Digital Himalaya).
- The Tibet Journal. (1975–present). Library of Tibetan Works and Archives. ISSN 0970-5368 (print). Official website. Archive: JSTOR.
- Yeshe: A Journal of Tibetan Literature, Arts and Humanities. (2021–present). Tibetan Arts and Literature Initiative. ISSN 2768-4261 (online). Official website.

== See also ==
- Asian studies
- Association for Asian Studies
- Bibliography of Chinese history
- List of history journals
- List of political science journals
- Sinology
