= Strategic Study of CAE =

Chinese academic journal for engineering

Strategic Study of CAE 中国工程科学
- Discipline: Engineering
- Language: Chinese, with English abstracts

Publication details
- History: 1999.10 -
- Publisher: China Engineering Science Press (China)
- Frequency: Bimonthly
- ISO 4: Find out here

Indexing
- ISSN: 1009-1742

Links
- Journal homepage

The Strategic Study of CAE (Chinese: 中国工程科学) is an official academic journal of the Chinese Academy of Engineering (CAE). Founded in 1999, the journal is now a national core journal indexed in Ei, CSCD and DOAJ. It focuses on strategic consulting research in engineering, and serves as a platform for disseminating studies and outcomes of major scientific and engineering projects. Strategic Study of CAE is published by China Engineering Science Press Co., Ltd., and cosponsored by the CAE Center for Strategic Studies and the Chinese Higher Education Press.

== History ==
In 1999, Journal "Strategic Study of CAE" was founded by the Chinese Academy of Engineering (CAE) in Beijing. The purpose was to support the CAE’s mission of providing strategic research and consultancy on key engineering issues in China.

In November 2014, the journal was listed in the first batch of academic journals recognized by the former State Administration of Press, Publication, Radio, Film and Television of China.

In 2019, Strategic Study of CAE was selected into the “echelon journals” category of the Phase I of the Excellence Action Plan for China's STM Journals.

In 2023: The journal was recognized as one of China’s 100 Outstanding Academic Journals in 2022.

In 2024: The journal was selected into Phase II of Excellence Action Plan.”

On April 2, 2025, Strategic Study of CAE was officially included in the Ei Compendex database.

== Scope ==
The main reporting contents of the journal include:

- Scientific discoveries and achievements,
- Technological innovations and developments,
- Typical engineering designs and experience summaries,
- Major engineering consulting and investigation reports.

More than 30% of the authors are academicians of the Chinese Academy of Sciences and the Chinese Academy of Engineering, and 52% are research fellows or professors.

== Indexing and recognition ==
Strategic Study of CAE is

- Indexed in Ei Compendex, CSCD,and JST China
- Included in CNKI, Wanfang Data, VIP, Superstar, and Baidu Scholar
- Named a Chinese‑language Leading Journal in Phase II (2024)
- Listed among the 100 Outstanding Academic Journals of China (2022)
- Source Journal of Peking University's "A Guide to the Core Journals of China"
- Source journal of Chinese Scientific and Technical Papers and Citations (CSTPCD).
- Included in the Directory of Open Access Journals (DOAJ).

== See also ==
- Chinese Academy of Engineering
- Engineering (journal)
