= Acta Academiae Medicinae Sinicae =

Acta Academiae Medicinae Sinicae 中国医学科学院学报
- Discipline: Medicine and health
- Language: Primarily Chinese, with English abstracts

Publication details
- History: since 1979; 47 years ago
- Publisher: Chinese Academy of Medical Sciences，Peking Union Medical College (People's Republic of China)
- Frequency: Bimonthly

Standard abbreviations
- ISO 4: Acta Acad. Med. Sin.

Indexing
- ISSN: 1000-503X

Links
- Journal homepage

The Acta Academiae Medicinae Sinicae (Chinese: 中国医学科学院学报), or "Zhongguo Yixue Kexueyuan Xuebao" in Pinyin transliteration, is a medical academic journal published by the Chinese Academy of Medical Sciences. Founded in 1979, Acta Academiae Medicinae Sinicae is now a bimonthly publishing original research, review articles, case reports, and clinical studies across a wide range of medical disciplines. The articles are published in Chinese, with summaries and table of contents in Chinese and English bilingual. The editorial office is located in Beijing, China.

== History ==
In 1979, academic journal Acta Academiae Medicinae Sinicae was founded by the Chinese Academy of Medical Sciences and Peking Union Medical College.

In 1992, 1996, 2000, 2004 and 2008, the journal was indexed in the "Core Journals of China";

In 2008, the journal was indexed in the "Chinese Science Citation Database" (CSCD). In the same year, it was indexed in WPRIM.

In 2009, the journal was indexed in "CA Chemical Abstracts" (USA), "CBST Science and Technology Literature Bulletin" (Japan) and "Pж(AJ) Abstract Journal" (Russia).

In 2014, the journal was listed in the first batch of academic journals recognized by the former State Administration of Press, Publication, Radio, Film and Television of China.

In 2018, Acta Academiae Medicinae Sinicae was rated as one of the "Top 100 Journals in China of 2017" by the Press and Publication Department of the State Administration of Press, Publication, Radio, Film and Television of the People's Republic of China.

== Scope and content ==
Acta Academiae Medicinae Sinicae publishes research papers in various fields related to Medicine, including basic medicine, clinical medicine, preventive medicine, biomedicine, pharmacy, and related interdisciplinary fields.

== Indexing and impact ==
Acta Academiae Medicinae Sinicae is indexed in a number of databases, including:

- Chemical Abstracts (USA) (2025)
- Japan Science and Technology Agency Database (Japan) (2025)
- Chinese Science Citation Database Source Journal (2025–2026)
- Science and Technology Journals World Impact Index Report (2024) Source Journal
- Peking University's Core Journals of China: 1992 (First Edition), 1996 (Second Edition), 2000 Edition, 2004 Edition, 2008 Edition, 2011 Edition, 2014 Edition, 2017 Edition, 2020 Edition, 2023 Edition
- Scopus (Since 1979, with continuous coverage up to 2024).

== Other information ==
Address: No.9 Dong Dan San Tiao，Beijing, PRC

The articles are published in Chinese, with summaries and table of contents in Chinese and English.

Published on paper and online.

== See also ==
- Chinese Academy of Medical Sciences
- Chinese Science Citation Database (CSCD)
- Chinese Medical Journal
