= Social Sciences in China (journal) =

Social Sciences in China 中国社会科学
- Discipline: Social science
- Language: English, Chinese

Publication details
- History: 1980–present
- Publisher: Routledge, Social Sciences in China Press
- Frequency: Monthly (Chinese), quarterly (English)
- ISO 4: Find out here

Links
- Journal homepage

Social Sciences in China (Chinese: 中国社会科学) is a peer-reviewed academic journal focusing on philosophy and social sciences in China. It was established in 1980 by the Chinese Academy of Social Sciences. The journal is in both Chinese and English. The Chinese edition (published by the Social Sciences in China Press, monthly) is a top journal in China. The English edition (published by Routledge, quarterly) is notable for being the first social science journal in English published in mainland China, and it remains a key platform for introducing Chinese scholarship to global audiences.

== History ==
Social Sciences in China was launched in 1980 in Chinese and English editions. While the Chinese edition serves domestic scholars, the English edition was created to present Chinese academic research to an international readership. It was the first social science journal in English published in the mainland China. Its articles are translated from the Chinese edition (中国社会科学, Zhongguo Shehui Kexue) or solicited for special issues.

In 1999, Social Sciences in China won the "First China Periodical Award".

In 2012, Social Sciences in China (Chinese version) changed its publication frequency from bimonthly to monthly.

In November 2014, the journal became one of the first batch of academic journals recognized by the former State Administration of Press, Publication, Radio, Film and Television of China.

In 2014, the journal was ranked Top-Tier Comprehensive Humanities and Social Sciences Journals in China.

In 2022, the journal Social Sciences in China (Traditional Chinese Selected Edition) was launched.

In 2025, Social Sciences in China was named "most popular Chinese journal of 2024" by the National Center for Philosophy and Social Sciences Documentation.

From January 1, 2026, Social Sciences in China will launch a new version of its submission and review platform.

== Scope and Content ==
Social Sciences in China publishes the most important research findings in the Chinese philosophy and social sciences, including:

- Philosophy and Marxist theory
- Economics and political science
- Law and sociology
- History and archaeology
- Literature, linguistics, and cultural studies
- International relations and regional studies

Articles of the English edition are either translated from the Chinese edition or solicited for special issues.

== Evaluation Information ==
Social Sciences in China (Chinese edition) is indexed in the following databases:

- CSSCI (Chinese Social Sciences Citation Index) Source Journal (2021–2022)
- AMI Top-Tier
- Source Journal of Peking University's "A Guide to the Core Journals of China"

Social Sciences in China (English edition) is abstracted and indexed in:

- International Bibliography of the Social Sciences
- SCOPUS
- Thomson Reuters Emerging Sources Citation Index (ESCI)
