= Early Development Program =

Chinese education initiative

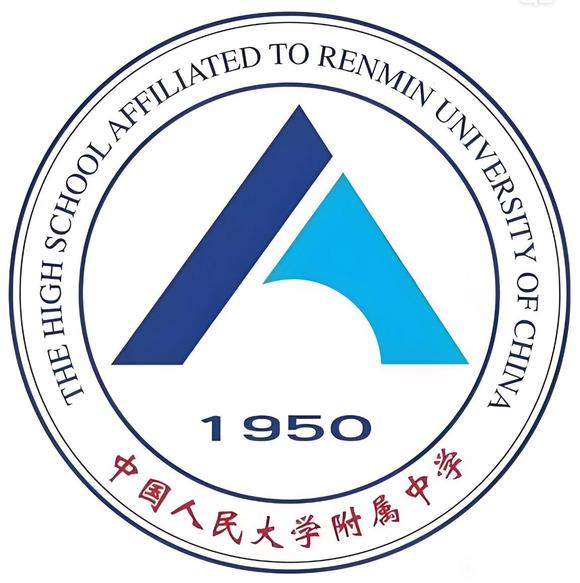
Logo of the High School Affiliated to Renmin University of China.

The Early Development Program (EDP) of The High School Affiliated to Renmin University of China (commonly known as RDFZ) is an educational initiative aimed at identifying and supporting students with high academic and creative potential at an early stage. Established in the late 1970s, the program is considered as a long-running educational initiative at The High School Affiliated to Renmin University of China.

== History ==
The High School Affiliated to Renmin University of China began participating in early identification and education for intellectually gifted students as early as 1978. In 1985, the school founded an experimental junior class for exceptionally gifted students. The Early Development Program（EDP）of The High School Affiliated to Renmin University of China was officially named the "Early Development Program" in 2010. In the same year, it became part of the National Pilot Program for Educational Reform, a project authorized by the Ministry of Education of the People's Republic of China, under Beijing' s initiative for developing innovative talent.

In 2013, The High School Affiliated to Renmin University of China was designated as one of the first schools participating in the Program for Fostering Reserve Talents in Scientific and Technological Innovation among Secondary School Students, jointly authorized by the China Association for Science and Technology and the Ministry of Education of the People's Republic of China. In 2016, it became one of the Beijing Association for Science and Technology's pilot schools for youth innovation training. Since 2019, publications have described the program as increasingly aligned with national policies on developing students' core competencies. In 2023, the Early Development Program (EDP) of The High School Affiliated to Renmin University of China was selected as one of the first 18 Beijing Bases for Cultivating Outstanding Innovative Youth, a project established by the Beijing Association for Science and Technology. In 2024, it joined the Haidian District Youth Innovation Talent Development Program, launched by the Haidian District People's Government of Beijing Municipality.

== Educational Philosophy ==
The Early Development Program (EDP) emphasizes cultivating both innovative spirit and creative capability. The program's philosophy holds that the development of innovative talent (literally "top innovative talents," referring to students with exceptional academic and creative abilities identified in China's gifted education programs) integrates creativity, problem-solving ability, and long-term innovation outcomes. During secondary education, the focus is on nurturing creative thinking and cognitive flexibility rather than the production of concrete research results.

The program's selection and evaluation processes consider both cognitive and non-cognitive factors. While intelligence quotient (IQ) tests are used, the program also values curiosity, imagination, creativity, and resilience, which are estimated to account for at least 30% of the overall assessment.

Instruction is designed to develop students' ability to apply knowledge flexibly to solve complex problems across disciplines. Instruction emphasizes learning through synthesis and exploration rather than the rote accumulation of subject-specific knowledge.

Since 2015, students of the Early Development Program (EDP) of The High School Affiliated to Renmin University of China have regularly participated in Programme for International Student Assessment (PISA)-based testing to evaluate key competencies. The school adapts PISA frameworks to local educational contexts and student developmental characteristics according to published reports.

== Curriculum ==
Based on decades of experience, the Early Development Program (EDP) has developed its own curriculum that combines both acceleration and enrichment. Unlike accelerated programs that shorten schooling years, the Early Development Program (EDP) maintains the standard progression from grade 6 through grade 12 while deepening and broadening content across subjects.

Reading and writing are emphasized. Since 2010, a "Classics Reading" course has been offered, with students reading more than 20 literary works and producing over 20,000 words of reading notes on average during the early program years.

Science education is also a major component. Courses in physics, chemistry, and biology begin as early as grade 6, often conducted in laboratories or off-campus facilities with an emphasis on experimentation.

In addition, the program offers Research and Special Topics Courses, which operate across grade levels and are taught by faculty from various disciplines and occasionally by external instructors. These courses typically run for at least one semester and include both school-based and field-based study components.

The following table shows a selection of research-oriented elective courses for Grade 7 students in the Early Development Program (EDP) .

Table: Research-oriented Elective Courses for Grade 7 Students in Early Development Program (EDP)
No.	Time	Course Title	Enrollment	Instructor
301	Wednesday morning	Algorithm and Programming Design	15	Gu Duoyu
302	Wednesday morning	Principles and Practice of Microcontrollers	16	Wu Yuejiang
303	Wednesday morning	Taekwondo	10	Liu Jing
304	Wednesday morning	Microfilm Production	20	Peng Huiyan
305	Wednesday morning	Analysis and Practice of Chinese and Foreign Drama	16	Zhou Jingyan
306	Wednesday morning	Digital Media Technology	25	Sun Xin
307	Wednesday morning	The Charm of Cinema — Film Music Appreciation	25	Lü Xiaowen
308	Wednesday morning	Microscopic Chemistry	16	Li Yan
309	Wednesday morning	English Film Appreciation	8	Chen Sihan
310	Wednesday morning	Independent Research in Physics	12	Zhou Jing, Wang Yuli

== Notable Achievements and Alumni ==
Students from the Early Development Program (EDP) have achieved recognition in national and international competitions, including:

- Deng Mingyang – Gold Medal, 2019 International Mathematical Olympiad (IMO); Gold Medal, 2021 International Olympiad in Informatics (IOI); youngest Legendary Grandmaster on Codeforces; later studied computer science at the Massachusetts Institute of Technology (MIT).
- Liu Yankuan – Gold Medal (Perfect Score), 2025 14th European Girls' Mathematical Olympiad (EGMO).
- Shao Minkai – First Prize, 2025 National Olympiad in Informatics (NOI).
- Peng Yichen – First Prize, 2024 National Olympiad in Informatics (NOI).

== Admissions ==
According to the latest admission guidelines, eligibility is limited to fifth-grade students residing in Beijing's Haidian District who demonstrate exceptional intellectual ability, strong character, and creativity. Applicants undergo a multi-stage selection process, including preliminary screening, interviews, and camp-based assessments.

Admission has been described as highly competitive. Between 2015 and 2024, the acceptance rate fluctuated between 0.6% and 1%. In 2024, over 12,000 students applied; about 2,800 advanced to the second stage, 700 attended the training camp, and around 100 were finally admitted, according to xscxx.com data.

Table: Admission Statistics of the Early Development Program (EDP) of The High School Affiliated to Renmin University of China, 2015–2024
Year	Approximate Number of Applicants	Number of Admitted Students	Acceptance Rate
2024	12,000	100	0.80%
2023	20,000	180	0.90%
2022	16,000	180	1.13%
2021	30,000	183	0.61%
2020	22,000	178	0.81%
2019	22,000	170	0.77%
2018	14,000	180	1.29%
2017	12,000	180	1.50%
2016	7,000	180	2.57%
2015	12,000	180	1.50%

== Publications ==
Publications discussing the educational philosophy of the Early Development Program (EDP) and The High School Affiliated to Renmin University of China include:

- Gao Jiangtao (2020), Planting Seeds for the Future: Experiences in Early Cultivation of Innovative Talents at The High School Affiliated to Renmin University of China, Renmin University Press, ISBN 9787300278704.
- Liu Pengzhi (2010), Educational Thought and Practice of Liu Pengzhi, Renmin University Press, ISBN 9787300125152.
- Liu Pengzhi (2003), Research on the Educational Philosophy of Liu Pengzhi, Encyclopedia of China Publishing House, ISBN 9787500067825.

Additionally, a series titled Documentary of The High School Affiliated to Renmin University of China Gifted Education (8 volumes, Higher Education Press, 2008) chronicles the growth and development of individual Early Development Program (EDP) students, each focusing on one alum's educational and personal story:

- Hu Yang (2008), Cheng Congfu, the Chinese Racer / Documentary Series on Gifted Education at The High School Affiliated to Renmin University of China, Beijing: Higher Education Press, ISBN 9787040248159.
- Hua Chao (2008), Pan Sisu, the Eccentric Scholar / Documentary Series on Gifted Education at The High School Affiliated to Renmin University of China, Beijing: Higher Education Press, ISBN 9787040248166.
- Shen Qian (2008), Wu Tianji, the Star of Invention / Documentary Series on Gifted Education at The High School Affiliated to Renmin University of China, Beijing: Higher Education Press, ISBN 9787040248173.
- Cai Zhiqiang (2008), Yang Di, the Young Artist / Documentary Series on Gifted Education at The High School Affiliated to Renmin University of China, Beijing: Higher Education Press, ISBN 9787040248180.
- Qiao Jian (2008), Xiao Dun, the Cambridge Student / Documentary Series on Gifted Education at The High School Affiliated to Renmin University of China, Beijing: Higher Education Press, ISBN 9787040248197.
- Li Bing (2008), Yang Xianan, the Century Girl / Documentary Series on Gifted Education at The High School Affiliated to Renmin University of China, Beijing: Higher Education Press, ISBN 9787040248203.
- Wang Dong (2008), Hou Xiaodi, the Campus Hacker / Documentary Series on Gifted Education at The High School Affiliated to Renmin University of China, Beijing: Higher Education Press, ISBN 9787040248210.
- Fang Jie (2008), Wang Yuxi, the Talented Young Painter / Documentary Series on Gifted Education at The High School Affiliated to Renmin University of China, Beijing: Higher Education Press, ISBN 9787040248227.
