= Front. Phys. =

Front. Phys. may refer to:

- Frontiers in Physics, published by Frontiers Media
- Frontiers of Physics, formerly known as Frontiers of Physics in China published by Higher Education Press Springer Verlag
