= Hong Kong Panel Study of Social Dynamics =

Longitudinal household panel survey of Hong Kong, launched 2011

Hong Kong Panel Study of Social Dynamics (HKPSSD)
- 香港社會動態追蹤調查
- Type of project: Longitudinal household panel survey
- Location: Hong Kong
- Founder: Xiaogang Wu
- Key people: Xiaogang Wu
- Established: 2011
- Funding: Hong Kong Research Grants Council; European Research Council
- Website: www.nyucaser.com/data-program/pssd

The Hong Kong Panel Study of Social Dynamics (HKPSSD; Chinese: 香港社會動態追蹤調查) is a longitudinal household panel survey of Hong Kong, launched in 2011 by Xiaogang Wu at the Hong Kong University of Science and Technology (HKUST). The project tracks a population-representative sample of Hong Kong households over time to study changes in family, employment, health, neighborhood, and political life. Five waves of data collection were carried out between 2011 and 2021, and after Wu moved to New York University Shanghai in 2020 the study's stewardship moved to the Center for Applied Social and Economic Research (CASER) there.

HKPSSD has been used as the primary data source in peer-reviewed studies of mental health, life satisfaction and suicide risk in Hong Kong by researchers at the University of Hong Kong Centre for Suicide Research and Prevention, of neighbourhood discrimination and mental health among mainland-Chinese immigrants, of homeownership and national identity, and of precarious work and political participation. Its sampling and weighting strategy has itself been the subject of methodological analysis by researchers outside the project team. The 2011 launch was reported in the South China Morning Post, and HKPSSD is listed by the Academia Sinica Panel Study of Family Dynamics among major international household panel surveys.

== Background ==
Prior to 2011, Hong Kong lacked a large-scale longitudinal household panel comparable to the Panel Study of Income Dynamics in the United States, the British Household Panel Survey, or the German Socio-Economic Panel, despite its extensive cross-sectional demographic statistics. HKPSSD was designed to fill that gap and to provide an instrument for studying trajectories of inequality, family change, mobility, and political attitudes within a fixed cohort over time.

The survey was implemented by the HKUST Center for Applied Social and Economic Research (since renamed the Center for AI in Economic, Social and Environmental Research, CAESER) and was funded primarily under the Hong Kong Research Grants Council's Strategic Public Policy Research Scheme. After Wu joined NYU Shanghai as Yufeng Global Professor of Social Science and founding director of NYU Shanghai's CASER, fieldwork and data dissemination continued at the new center.

== Sampling and methodology ==
HKPSSD draws its sample from the Frame of Quarters maintained by the Hong Kong Census and Statistics Department, which covers the non-institutionalised land population — about 99 percent of Hong Kong residents. To represent both geography and socioeconomic status, the survey uses stratified random sampling built around a neighborhood socioeconomic index constructed at the level of Hong Kong's Constituency Areas.

The stratification procedure has four steps: specifying a target sample of around 3,200 households and the sampling frame; constructing a neighborhood socioeconomic index for each Constituency Area; stratifying roughly 70,000 sampled addresses by that index; and drawing a random sample of addresses with stratum-specific allocations adjusted for prior response rates. Tianji Cai and Hongyu Wang of the University of Macau subsequently analysed HKPSSD's nonresponse-weighting strategy in a 2018 paper in the Chinese Sociological Review, comparing it with the Renmin University-based Beijing College Student Panel Survey. Fieldwork has combined face-to-face household interviews with telephone follow-ups and online self-report.

== Data collection waves ==
HKPSSD waves of data collection
| Wave | Year(s) | Notes |
|---|---|---|
| Wave 1 (benchmark) | 2011 | 3,214 households; 7,218 adults and 958 children interviewed. |
| Wave 2 | 2013 | 2,165 households, 4,270 adults and 623 children re-interviewed; refreshment sample of 1,007 households added in 2014. |
| Wave 3 | 2015 | Combined sample re-interviewed: about 2,348 households, 4,961 adults and 477 children. |
| Wave 4 | 2017–2018 | Re-interviewed 2,000 households, comprising 3,407 adults and 412 children; a second refreshment sample added 840 households in 2018–2019.[5] |
| Wave 5 | 2020–2021 | Mixed-mode survey combining online self-administered questionnaires and telephone interviews; three rounds recontacted previous households  and one online refreshment sample was added. No child or household questionnaires were  fielded.[5] |

The five waves span a decade of major social and political events in Hong Kong, including the 2014 Occupy Central protests, the 2019 protests over the proposed extradition law, and the COVID-19 pandemic.

== Topics ==
The HKPSSD questionnaire originally focused on family and inequality and has since expanded to cover housing and household economic activity; education, marriage and children; employment and careers; physical and psychological health; social participation and community ties; political participation and national identity; and attitudes toward immigrants. Dedicated modules survey respondents not born in Hong Kong, and respondents aged 60 and above.

== Use in research ==
By May 2026, Wu's 2016 methodological overview of HKPSSD had been cited in approximately fifty peer-reviewed works. Substantive uses of HKPSSD data by researchers outside the project team include:

- Mental health, life satisfaction and suicide. Chih-Yin Hsu, Shu-Sen Chang and Paul S.F. Yip of the University of Hong Kong's Centre for Suicide Research and Prevention used Wave 1 of HKPSSD in a multilevel analysis of individual-, household- and neighbourhood-level predictors of life satisfaction in Urban Studies, and in a follow-up paper in Epidemiology and Psychiatric Sciences linking subjective wellbeing and suicide risk to socioeconomic factors. Chi Hin Chan, Hung Kuen Wong and Yip used HKPSSD to examine the association of relative income deprivation with perceived happiness and self-rated health in the International Journal of Public Health.
- Discrimination and immigrant integration. Juan Chen and colleagues used HKPSSD in a 2019 study in the Journal of Immigrant and Minority Health on the effects of perceived neighborhood discrimination toward mainland-Chinese immigrants on mental health.
- Homeownership and national identity. Fu, Cai and Mo used HKPSSD in a 2024 quasi-experimental study in the Journal of Asian Public Policy on the effect of home-ownership on Hong Kong people's national identity.
- Precarious employment and political participation. Lan Yudong and Zheng Jiayu used HKPSSD in a 2024 paper in Politická ekonomie on the relationship between precarious work and political participation. Junmin Li used HKPSSD alongside mainland-China data in a comparative study of precarious work and labour-market segmentation in the Journal of Chinese Sociology.
- Comparative identity research. Tianji Cai and colleagues used HKPSSD in a comparative analysis of national identity in Hong Kong and Macau, published in the Chinese Sociological Review.

The methodological design of HKPSSD has itself been the subject of external analysis: Cai and Wang's 2018 paper in the Chinese Sociological Review on nonresponse weighting compares HKPSSD's approach with that of the Beijing College Student Panel Survey. The Academia Sinica Panel Study of Family Dynamics in Taiwan lists HKPSSD on its public website alongside major international household panels such as the British Household Panel Survey, the German Socio-Economic Panel, and the Panel Study of Income Dynamics.

== Media coverage ==
The launch of HKPSSD was reported by the South China Morning Post in October 2012, which discussed Wave 1 findings on the division of household labour in Hong Kong relative to mainland China and Taiwan. HKPSSD has also been discussed in Hong Kong Chinese-language media in the context of Pearl River Delta survey infrastructure.

== Data access ==
HKPSSD's bilingual (English–Chinese) questionnaires for Waves 1, 2 and 2B and a poverty supplement, together with a 2022 technical report (ISBN 978-988-76496-0-1), are distributed through NYU CASER. Microdata products include household-level files for the early waves and a stand-alone Hong Kong Neighborhood Socioeconomic Status Index dataset covering 2001–2021.

== See also ==
- Panel survey
- Panel Study of Income Dynamics
- Xiaogang Wu
