= Bouden House =

New York-based publishing house

博登书屋 Bouden House
- Founded: 2020; 6 years ago
- Founder: David Rong
- Country of origin: United States
- Headquarters location: New York City, New York
- Publication types: Books, journals
- Official website: boudenhouse.org

Bouden House (simplified Chinese: 博登书屋; traditional Chinese: 博登書屋; pinyin: Bódēng Shūwū) is a publishing house based in New York City, publishing academic and literary works in both Chinese and English that cover contemporary politics, economics, arts and literature, as well as culture, history, and philosophy concerning China and the world.

== History ==
Bouden House was established in 2020. Its founding was prompted by the silencing of Tsinghua University professor Xu Zhangrun in China, which caused the domestic publication plans for his completed manuscript, Six Chapters on the Year of Wuxu (戊戌六章), to fall through. Shortly after the book was published, Xu Zhangrun was taken into custody by the police. The publishing team led by David Rong (荣伟) subsequently established Bouden House in New York. Since its inception, the majority of the titles published by Bouden House have been in Chinese, with a small number in English; distribution is handled through Amazon and Google.

== Journal ==
Bouden House also publishes a bilingual journal on contemporary China, Contemporary China Review (simplified Chinese: 当代中国评论; traditional Chinese: 當代中國評論; pinyin: Dāngdài Zhōngguó Pínglùn). The Chinese edition (ISSN: 2765-9143) is published bimonthly, and the English version (ISSN: 2767-6803) is published annually.

== Awards ==
In 2024, Bouden House held its 2024 Book Awards Ceremony to honor Chinese-language authors who had achieved outstanding research results in fields such as politics and economics, arts and literature, philosophy, and the humanities and history during the previous year.

== Reception ==
Xu Zhangrun has described Bouden House as a "symbol of the voice of freedom," while Ding Xueliang, a professor at the Hong Kong University of Science and Technology, likened it to the "renowned cultural publishing circles of the late Qing and early Republican eras," calling it a "spiritual comrade-in-arms" to authors. After the publication of Gao Yaojie: A Pictorial Biography, Andrew Nathan, a professor of political science at Columbia University, told David Rong: "I believe the work you are doing now is an investment in intellectual and moral capital—one that will benefit China in the long run."

== Authors ==
Notable authors include Andrew Nathan, Xu Zhangrun, Zhang Qianfan, Guo Yuhua, Qin Hui, Wu Guoguang, Fei-Ling Wang, Dai Qing, Yefu, Zhang Kangkang, Xu Zhiyong, Wang Xizhe, Xu Liangying, Deng Yuwen, Hu Xingdou, Guo Feixiong, Ha Jin, Yang Zili, Zheng Yi, Wang Bingzhang, Zhang Xuezhong, Liu Yazhou, Li Honglin, Xiao Shu, among others.
