= Bouden =

Bouden may refer to:

== Publisher ==
- Bouden House, U.S.-based publisher

== Surname ==
- Ahmed Bouden (born 1938), Algerian footballer
- Bouabid Bouden (born 1982), Moroccan footballer
- Najla Bouden (born 1958), Tunisian politician
  - Bouden Cabinet
- Tom Bouden (born 1971), Belgian artist
