= Zi Zhongyun =

Chinese translator and historian (born 1930)

- 资中筠
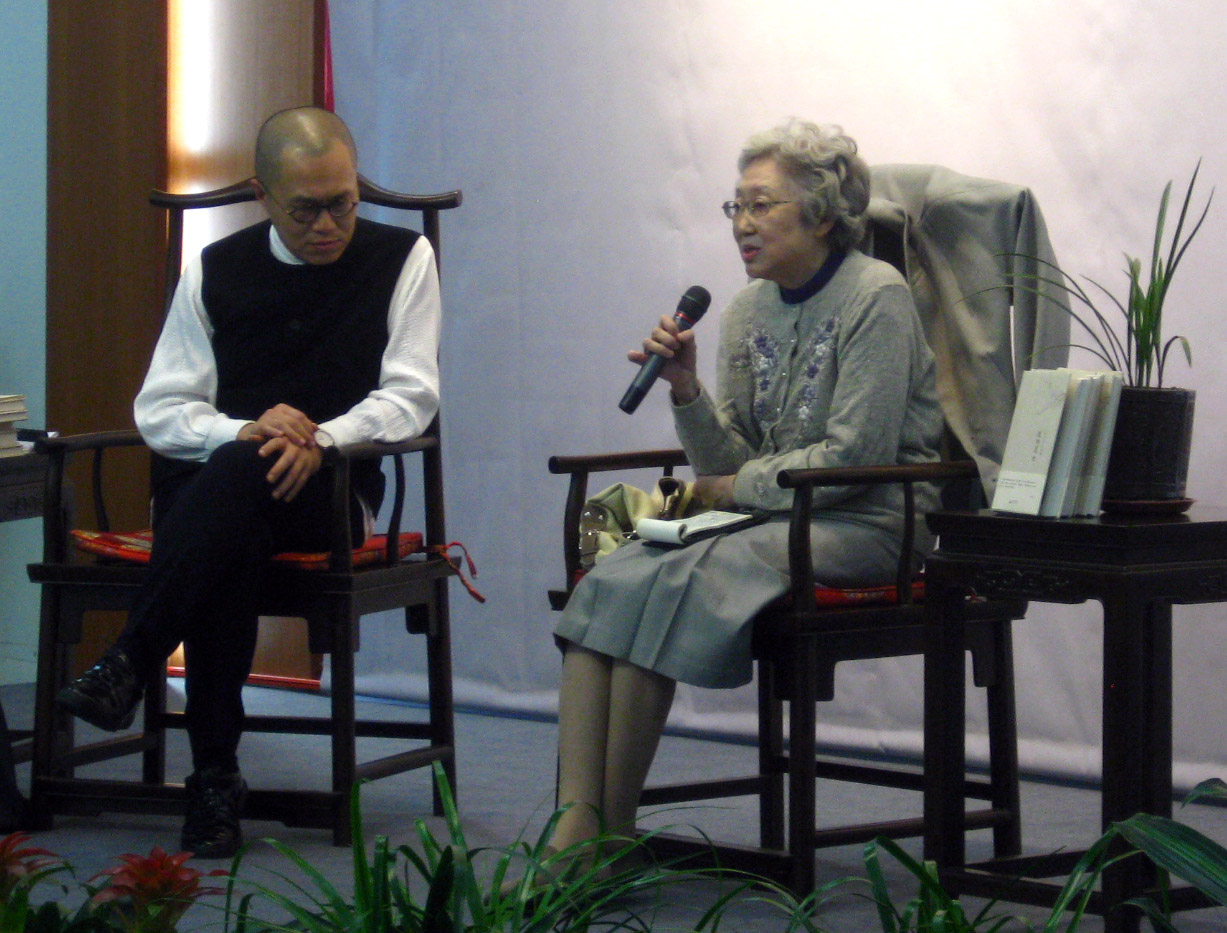
- Zi Zhongyun, 2011
- Born: June 1930 (age 96); Shanghai, China
- Education: Tsinghua University
- Occupations: Translator, historian, professor
- Spouse: Chen Lemin
- Relatives: Zi Yaohua (father); Tong Yijun (mother)
- Writing career
- Language: Chinese, English, French
- Period: 1953–present

Zi Zhongyun (simplified Chinese: 资中筠; traditional Chinese: 資中筠; pinyin: Zī Zhōngyún; born June 1930) is a Chinese translator and historian who is an expert on US studies with the Chinese Academy of Social Sciences. She is proficient in English and French.

== Biography ==
Zi was born into a scholarly family in Shanghai in June 1930, with her ancestral home in Leiyang, Hunan, the daughter of Tong Yijun (童益君), a Chinese officer, and Zi Yaohua (资耀华), a banker and financier who was a graduate of Kyoto University, University of Pennsylvania and Harvard University. She has two sister, Zi Huayun (资华筠) and Zi Minyun (资民筠). Zi Huayuan, a dancer and actress, was born in 1936. Zi Minyun, a physicist, was born in 1938.

Zi secondary studied at the Yaohua High School (耀华中学). She entered Tsinghua University in 1948, majoring in English language and French language in the Department of Western Languages and Literature, where she graduated in 1951.

After graduation, she was assigned to Chinese Ministry of Foreign Affairs.

From 1956 to 1959, she worked as a translator in Vienna.

In 1971, she started to work at the US department affiliated with Chinese People's Association for Friendship with Foreign Countries (CPAFFC).

In 1979, she was diagnosed with cancer. However, she recovered fast due to imminent treatments.

After her recovery, she visited the US and Canada for the first time as a member of the Friendly Representative led by Bingnan Wang.

In 1980, she worked at China Institute of International Studies (中国国际问题研究所), then she worked at Princeton University as a researcher in 1982.

From 1985 to 1992, she worked at Chinese Academy of Social Sciences. In 1988, she accepted the promotion as the primary administrator of the US studies at Chinese Academy of Social Science.

In 1991, she resigned from the position of administrator.

From the end of 1991 to October 1992, she was a scholar at the Woodrow Wilson International Center for Scholars, specializing in China studies.

She retired in 1996.

== Viewpoints ==
=== Comments on her career ===
Zi categorized her career into three phases in an interview. From the 1950s to the 1970s, she worked at the World Congress of Advocates of Peace and the Chinese People's Association for Friendship with Foreign Countries (CPAFFC). From the end of 1970 to the mid-1980, she primarily studied international affairs and politics, focusing on the US. She first worked at the China Institute of International Studies (CIIS), and then after 1985, she transferred to the Chinese Academy of Social Science. After she retired from CASS, she dedicated herself to more profound US studies and critical writing related to China's temporary social issues. She considered the last phase the most meaningful and contributed.

=== Civil education ===
Zi claimed that it is necessary to integrate civic education into regular classes. She emphasized in the interview that civic education enabled individuals to be aware of their rights and duties as citizens, including how to treat underage people properly and how to protect their autonomy and freedom by respecting others' rights. She said that a good citizen is a person who knows how to be accountable to their social obligations and advocates for their rights.

She claimed that China had entered the first stage of enlightenment of civic awareness through her observation of the 2008 Sichuan earthquake. She enumerated three pillars. First, non-governmental donation campaigns were happening nationwide. She looked forward to more charity campaigns even under governmental restrictions and regulations. Second, regional governments hindered volunteers from being helpful because the authorities would not distribute their authority and power. Third, the development of NGOs faced many obstacles and challenges under governmental scrutiny.

=== The ends of education ===
Zi believes education enables citizens to access knowledge and facilitates the development of civilization and society. Furthermore, education cultivates qualified citizens, while the definition of citizenship varies from the era and social context. She emphasized the difference between citizens and subjects: citizens have fundamental rights, such as freedom of speech, the possession of the property, etc. However, citizens are also obligated to respect other citizens' rights and should not violate them for self-interests.

In 2019, her essay, "Mourning Tsinghua", first criticized university administrators' neglect of historic buildings on campus, some of which were destroyed by fire in 2010. She then went on to protest the treatment of professor Xu Zhangrun, who discovered that a student had been paid to report on the content of his lectures. She regarded this as the "latest round of 'book burning and burying scholars'", a suppression of free thought that started with Qin Shi Huangdi.

=== Cold War study ===
Zi stated six pillars about how to study the Cold War as qualified scholars.

1. First, scholars should consider historical archives as primary sources to avoid subjectivity and biased narratives.
2. Second, scholars should be more patient and meticulous about discourses' formation: coming up with research topics and thesis after reading abundant sources and documents. In this way, scholars can genuinely sense the amusement of academia.
3. Third, historical details matter. Sometimes, nuances can overturn previous prevalent theories or conclusions; however, contextualization is also crucial to correctly grasp the nuances and details.
4. Fourth, since there have been plenty of studies related to the Cold War, innovations and new ideologies are essential to effectively and meaningfully contribute to the Cold War studies.
5. Fifth, scholars should contain broader mindsets. They should realize what states rulers and leaders deem as national interests do not necessarily represent the true interests of the public and citizens. Therefore, scholars should be relatively independent of the national interests claimed by governments and political figures.
6. Finally, the goal of Cold War studies should be to maintain war peace. Therefore, scholars should authentically possess a sense of caring for peace and ethics while researching and publishing articles.

=== Tsinghua Global Development Forum ===
At the 2020 Tsinghua Global Development Forum, Zi commented that future China-United States relations depended on internal development, and that China should insist on the reform and opening up, integrate with the world, and value the role of technological advancement and talent. She said that China should also take inspiration from Europe to prosper and thrive.

== Works ==
- In the 20th Century America (20世纪的美国)
- Xuehai'anbian (学海岸边)
- American Diplomatic History (美国外交史)
- American Research (美国研究)

== Translations ==
- Civil Servant (Honoré de Balzac) (奥诺雷·德·巴尔扎克《公务员》)
- Oh, the Pioneer (Willa Cather) (薇拉·凯瑟《啊, 拓荒者》)
- The Bohemia Girl (Willa Cather) (薇拉·凯瑟《波西米亚女郎》)
- The Bridges of Madison County (Robert James Waller) (罗伯特·詹姆斯·沃勒《廊桥遗梦》)
- Philosophy (Alain de Botton) (阿兰·德波顿《哲学的慰藉》)

== Awards ==
- Chinese Translation Association – Competent Translator (2004)

== Personal life ==
Zi was married to a Chinese historian, scholar and European expert, Chen Lemin (陈乐民), he was born in 1930 and died in 2008.
