= Engineering (journal) =

- Discipline: Engineering
- Language: English
- Edited by: Raj Reddy and Ji Zhou

Publication details
- History: 2015–present
- Publisher: Higher Education Press/Elsevier

Standard abbreviations
- ISO 4: Engineering (Beijing)

Indexing
- ISSN: 2095-8099

Links
- Journal homepage

Engineering is peer-reviewed open access academic journal of engineering launched in 2015 by the Chinese Academy of Engineering. It is published by Higher Education Press in China, while it is published by Elsevier internationally. The journal is edited by Raj Reddy (Carnegie Mellon University) and Ji Zhou (Chinese Academy of Engineering). The journal is indexed by Scopus and Science Citation Index Expanded.

== See also ==
- Chinese Academy of Engineering
- Strategic Study of CAE
