= AMI Comprehensive Evaluation Report =

The AMI Comprehensive Evaluation Report of Chinese Journals of Humanities and Social Sciences (Chinese: 《中国人文社会科学期刊AMI综合评价报告》; pinyin: Zhōngguó Rénwén Shèhuì Kēxué Qīkān AMI Zònghé Píngjià Bàogào), commonly known as the AMI Comprehensive Evaluation Report (AMI核心期刊), is an academic evaluation system and report developed by the Chinese Academy of Social Sciences (CASS). The system is one of the three major journal evaluation frameworks officially recognized in China’s humanities and social sciences, alongside Nanjing University’s Chinese Social Sciences Citation Index (CSSCI) and Peking University’s A Guide to the Core Journals of China (commonly known as the Peking University Core Journals List).

== History ==
The AMI system was developed under a national initiative to establish a comprehensive evaluation framework for philosophy and social sciences journals, moving beyond traditional bibliometric indicators such as impact factors. In 2014, the Chinese Academy of Social Sciences Evaluation Center (中国社会科学评价中心) released the first China Humanities and Social Sciences Journal Evaluation Report (2014) — the inaugural AMI Comprehensive Evaluation Report — and announced the first list of AMI Core Journals. Following its four-year evaluation cycle, subsequent editions were released in 2018 and 2022, each providing updated assessments and revised core journal lists based on new data and refined methodologies.

== Evaluation framework ==
The AMI acronym stands for:

- A – Attraction (吸引力): the ability of a journal to attract high-quality submissions, authors, and readership.
- M – Management (管理力): the management capacity of the editorial office, including institutional structure, editorial processes, integrity mechanisms, and staff professionalism.
- I – Impact (影响力): the academic and societal influence of a journal within the scholarly community and the broader public sphere.

The AMI Comprehensive Evaluation Index System consists of three primary indicators, thirteen secondary indicators, and thirty-one tertiary indicators.

== See also ==
- CSSCI
- A Guide to the Core Journals of China
