= Frontiers of Architectural Research =

- Discipline: Architecture
- Language: English
- Edited by: Jianguo Wang

Publication details
- History: 2012–present
- Publisher: Elsevier on behalf of Higher Education Press
- Frequency: Bimonthly

Standard abbreviations
- ISO 4: Front. Archit. Res.

Indexing
- ISSN: 2095-2635 (print); 2095-2643 (web)

Links
- Journal homepage; Higher Education Press

Frontiers of Architectural Research is a bimonthly peer-reviewed open access academic journal covering the field of architecture, including architectural design and theory, architectural science and technology, urban planning, landscape architecture, existing building renovation and architectural heritage conservation. It is published by Elsevier on behalf of Higher Education Press. The journal was established in 2012 and the editor-in-chief is Jianguo Wang (Southeast University (China)).

The journal is abstracted and indexed in the Arts & Humanities Citation Index, Scopus, Directory of Open Access Journals, and the Chinese Science Citation Database.
