= Guo Yuhua =

Chinese sociologist

Guo Yuhua (Chinese: 郭于华; pinyin: Guō Yúhuá) is a Chinese liberal intellectual and professor of sociology at Tsinghua University, noted for her criticism of the Chinese government.

== Early life and education ==
Guo was born in 1956 to parents who worked as military officers for the central government in Beijing. Her father was persecuted during the Cultural Revolution, dying of liver cirrhosis in 1968 after being denied medication. Guo was sent "Down to the Countryside" to perform labor in Wuhan, returning to Beijing in 1980.

Guo received her doctorate in folklore studies at Beijing Normal University in 1990, with her dissertation written on Chinese folk culture, ritual, and religion. She joined the Chinese Academy of Social Sciences and in 2000. She also did post-doctoral studies in anthropology at Harvard from 2000 to 2001.

== Career and views ==
Guo is a professor in the Department of Sociology at Tsinghua University. Her research focuses in particular on rural communities, the rights and interests of their citizens, and the relationship between state and society in China.

In 2013, Guo published a book based on her research of oral histories in Ji village of Shaanxi province, entitled The Narration of the Peasant: How Can ‘Suffering’ Become History?. The book was published in Hong Kong and censored within mainland China.

Guo is a critic of the Chinese Communist Party (CCP) and an advocate for democratic reforms to China's political system. She frequently posts her criticisms of the government on social media, including through WeChat and Sina Weibo accounts, the latter of which she claims has been blocked seventy-four times between 2010 and 2018. Her central criticism of the CCP is her argument that its political system does not treat citizens as people, but "utilitarian objects" subject to management and control.

Guo was an outspoken supporter of Xu Zhangrun, another Tsinghua professor, who was prevented from teaching in 2019 after publishing a public essay critical of General Secretary of the Chinese Communist Party Xi Jinping.
