= Chinese Studies in History =

- Discipline: History
- Language: English
- Edited by: Q. Edward Wang

Publication details
- Former names: Chinese Studies in History and Philosophy: A Journal of Translations
- History: 1967–present
- Publisher: Routledge
- Frequency: Quarterly
- ISO 4: Find out here

Indexing
- ISSN: 0009-4633 (print); 1558-0407 (web)

Links
- Journal homepage

Chinese Studies in History is an English-language academic journal in the field of Chinese history. It publishes English-language articles on Chinese studies in history, along with English-language reviews of Chinese-language historical works. It was established in 1967 and is published quarterly by Routledge, an imprint of Taylor & Francis.

== History ==
The journal began in 1967 under the title Chinese Studies in History and Philosophy: A Journal of Translations. The first two volumes, covering 1967 and 1968, appeared under that title before it was shortened to its present form. Its first publisher was International Arts and Sciences Press of White Plains, New York. Publication passed to M.E. Sharpe in 1977, and the press was later based in Armonk, New York. In November 2014 M.E. Sharpe was acquired by Taylor & Francis, and the journal has since been issued by Routledge, with its editorial and publication office in Philadelphia.

The journal belonged to a group of translation periodicals on China issued by the same publishers. One of them, Chinese Sociology and Anthropology, began in 1968 and was renamed Chinese Sociological Review in 2011, when it became a journal publishing original English-language research.

== Editors ==
The founding editor-in-chief was the historian Professor Bernadette Y. Li, who served until 2008; the current editor-in-chief is Q. Edward Wang, a professor in the Department of History at Rowan University.

== Abstracting and indexing ==
The journal is abstracted/indexed in America: History and Life, Arts and Humanities Citation Index, Bibliography of Asian Studies Online, Current Contents/Arts and Humanities, Historical Abstracts, MLA International Bibliography, and Scopus.
