= Frontiers in Biology =

- Discipline: Biology
- Language: English

Publication details
- Former name(s): Frontiers of Biology in China
- History: 2006–present
- Publisher: Springer Science+Business Media on behalf of Higher Education Press
- Frequency: Bimonthly

Standard abbreviations
- ISO 4: Front. Biol.

Indexing
- CODEN: FBRIA3
- ISSN: 1674-7984 (print); 1674-7992 (web)
- OCLC no.: 890054722

Links
- Journal homepage; Journal page on Springer website; Online access; Online archive

Frontiers in Biology was a bimonthly peer-reviewed scientific journal covering the field of biology. It was established in 2006 and was published by Higher Education Press and Springer Science+Business Media, supervised by the Ministry of Education of China. The editor-in-chief is Hongjun Song (Johns Hopkins University). The journal ceased publication at the end of 2018.

== Abstracting and indexing ==
The journal is abstracted and indexed in Chemical Abstracts Service, ProQuest databases, Chinese Science Citation Database, and EMBiology.
