= Zhang Nuanxin =

Chinese film director (1940–1995)

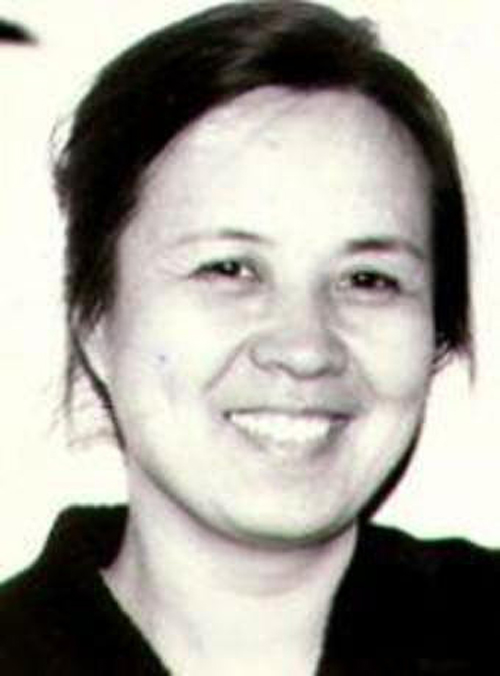
- Born: Zhang Nuanxin; 27 October 1940; Inner Mongolia
- Died: 28 May 1995 (aged 54); Beijing
- Occupation: Director
- Years active: 1970s-1990s
- Spouse: Li Tuo

Zhang Nuanxin (Chinese: 张暖忻, 27 October 1940 – 28 May 1995) was a Chinese film director and a leading figure of the Fourth Generation of Chinese directors.

Her most famous film, The Drive to Win, won the 2nd Golden Rooster Special Jury Award. Nuanxin is also well known for her films Sacrifice of Youth and A Yunnan Story.

Jinhua Dai, Chinese film theorist and doctoral supervisor of Peking University, argues that Nuanxin was not only a film director but also a film theorist. Her journal article The Film Language' s Modernization, which she co-authored with her husband Li Tuo, is considered a manifesto for modern Chinese cinema. Another film theorist, Zhenqin Zhang, argues that she was the pioneer of realistic Chinese film aesthetics and Chinese womens' cinema.

== Early life and education ==
Nuanxin Zhang was born in Inner Mongolia, China. Her parents were doctors, and her family was from Tieling, Liaoning, China. In 1943, Nuanxin Zhang moved with her parents to Beijing, China. She was raised in Beijing.

In 1958, Nuanxin Zhang graduated from the High School Affiliated to Renmin University of China and began studying at the Beijing Film Academy.

In 1962, Zhang graduated and later returned as a professor at the department of directing. She married the famous Chinese writer Li Tuo the same year. Zhang kept teaching at the Beijing Film Academy until 1972.

In 1974, she started working in Shanghai Film Studio where she began a career in filmmaking.

Because she studied at the Beijing Film Academy around the 1960s but started making films in the 1970s, she is considered as a Chinese fourth-generation film director.

== 1974-1979 Early career ==
In 1979, she joined the Shanghai Film Studio and began her career as a director's assistant. She worked with famous directors such as Hu Sang and Xie Jin, the leading figure of Chinese third-generation film directors. She began to gain experience as a film maker when working on The second spring (1974) and ChunMiao (1975).

Three years later, she began working with Yao Shuping and her husband Li Tuo on her first film script Li Siguang (1979). That same year co-authored an article called The Modernization of the Language of Film with her husband which was published Film Arts the most famous Chinese film academic journal. Chinese film theorist Dai Jinhua argues that The Film Language ' s Modernization is the manifesto of new era Chinese cinema.

== Film director ==
=== 1980s ===
1981, Nuanxin Zhang directed her first film The Drive to Win (1981), and it won her a Golden Rooster special director awards, best recording awards. Chinese Ministry of Culture also gives The Drive to Win the outstanding film award. The Drive to Win was met with critical acclaim, bringing Zhang to the forefront of the Chinese art directors. Because of the success of the film The Drive to Win, Zhang wrote the book which is The Drive to Win— from script to film and this book published by China Film Press in December 1983. In 1984, Zhang starts to planning the film Sacrifice of Youth (1985), this film is adapted from the novel A beautiful place which wrote by Manling Zhang, and it finished in 1985. In 1987, Zhang Nuanxin with French director Jacques Dorfmann co-directed the film Le Palanquin des Larmes (1987). In 1988, Nuanxin Zhang plans to adapted famous Chinese author Wang Shuo's novel Playing for Thrills and finished the film script. Eventually, she didn't finish it.

=== 1990s ===
In the 1990s, Zhang Nuanxin made her most important films. In 1990, Nuanxin Zhang directed the film Good Morning, Beijing (1990), which won the Hong Kong International Film Festival Best Film from Mainland and Taiwan award. The actors in this film included Wang Quanan, Ma Xiaoqing, and Jia Hongsheng. Quanan later became a leading figure of Chinese sixth-generation film directors.

In 1993, Nuanxin Zhang directed A Yunnan Story (1993), starring famous actor Pu Cunxin. 1994: South China (1994) was Nuanxin's final film. On May 28, 1995, Nuanxin Zhang died in Beijing of cancer. Her funeral was held on June 3. Famous Chinese author Wang Zengqi wrote her an elegiac couplet.

== Style and influences ==
Zhang's film treats themes of alienated youth, contemporary Chinese history, as well as her signature usage of the long-take, color digital video, and his realist style. Chinese film theorist Zhang Zhenqin argues that Nuanxin Zhang's work speaks to a vision of "authentic" Chinese life. Film scholar Lidan Hu argues that from The Drive to Win to Sacrificed Youth, Zhang had greater freedom to include romantic love as an emotional attribute of female subjectivity, while personal expression remained intertwined with nationalist discourse. The Drive to Win, in particular, Zhang tells a story about women, about a normal female volleyball athlete(Sha Ou Played by Shanshan Chang)'s life, even Sha ou has been going through the team lose world champion and her husband's death, but her still facing her life optimistic. She represents a generation who was living in that period. So Chinese film theorist Zhang Zhenqin argues that she is the pioneer of Chinese film realistic aesthetics, and Chinese women cinema. And because The Drive to Win represents a generation and women's life who living in that period, this film is being considered as Zhang Nuanxin's most important.

== Writing ==
=== The Film Language's Modernization ===
The film language's modernization (1979), co-written by Zhang Nuanxin and her husband Li Tuo, is considered the manifesto of a new era of Chinese cinema. Chinese film critic Yao Shuguang argues that if there is a golden age from the late 1970s to the mid-1980s, it was not only the golden age of Chinese filmmaking but also the era of the development of Chinese film theory. At that time, film theory affected and dominated the creation of film to a certain extent. The film language's modernization is one of the representative texts of the time. The film language's modernization argues that filmmaking should no longer revolve around the political but return to creating film itself.

Shuguang Yao also argues the limation of The film language's modernization which is this article admire Bazin's long-shot theory without careful analysis and reflection.

== Filmography ==
=== Film ===
Year	English title	Chinese title	Notes
1979	Li Siguang	李四光	Scriptwriter
1981	The Drive to Win	沙鸥	Director, Scriptwriter
1985	Sacrifice of Youth	青春祭	Director, Scriptwriter
1987	Le Palanquin des Larmes	花轿泪	Co-director
1990	Good Morning, Beijing	北京你早	Director
1993	A Yunnan Story	云南故事	Director
1994	1994:South China	南中国1994	Director
