= Frontiers in Energy =

- Discipline: Engineering
- Language: English

Publication details
- Former name(s): Frontiers of Energy and Power Engineering in China
- History: 2007–present
- Publisher: Springer Science+Business Media on behalf of Higher Education Press
- Frequency: Quarterly

Standard abbreviations
- ISO 4: Front. Energy

Indexing
- ISSN: 2095-1701 (print); 2095-1698 (web)
- OCLC no.: 729399831

Links
- Journal homepage

Frontiers in Energy is a quarterly peer-reviewed scientific journal on energy. It is published by Springer Science+Business Media on behalf of the Higher Education Press. The editors-in-chief are Shilie Weng (Shanghai Jiao Tong University), Weidou Ni (Tsinghua University), and Suping Peng (China University of Mining and Technology). The journal was established in 2007 as Frontiers of Energy and Power Engineering in China, before obtaining its current title.

== Abstracting and indexing ==
The journal is abstracted and indexed in:

- Science Citation Index Expanded (SciSearch)
- EBSCO databases
- ProQuest databases
- Scopus
- Inspec
- Academic OneFile
- Chinese Science Citation Database
- Expanded Academic ASAP
