= RDFZ United =

Founded in 2012, RDFZ United serves as the top-level administrative body to facilitate all the branches under its governance.

== Branches and subsidiaries ==
RDFZ United
- 人大附中联合总校

Location
- No.37 Zhongguancun Street, Haidian District (100080); Beijing; China

Information
- Type: Private and Public
- Established: 2012
- Principal: Pengzhi Liu (刘彭芝)
- Colors: Red; White
- Affiliations: Renmin University of China
- Website: www.rdfz.cn/lhzx/lhzxxw/

The most famous branch under its governance is High School Affiliated to Renmin University of China.
