= High School Affiliated to Renmin University of China =

High school in Beijing, China

Coordinates: 39°58′24.27″N 116°18′32.51″E

- 中国人民大学附属中学

Location
- 37 Zhongguancun Street; Haidian, Beijing; China

Information
- Other names: RDFZ (人大附中); Rendafuzhong
- Type: Public
- Motto: 崇德，博学，创新，求实 (Virtue, Erudition, Creativity and Factualism)
- Established: April 3, 1950; 76 years ago
- CEEB code: 694270
- Principal: Liu Xiaohui (刘小惠)
- Principal Emeritus: Liu Pengzhi (刘彭芝)
- Enrollment: 4,500 (2018)
- Campus size: 142 acres (57 ha)
- Campus type: Urban
- Colors: Red and White
- Affiliations: Renmin University of China
- Website: www.rdfz.cn

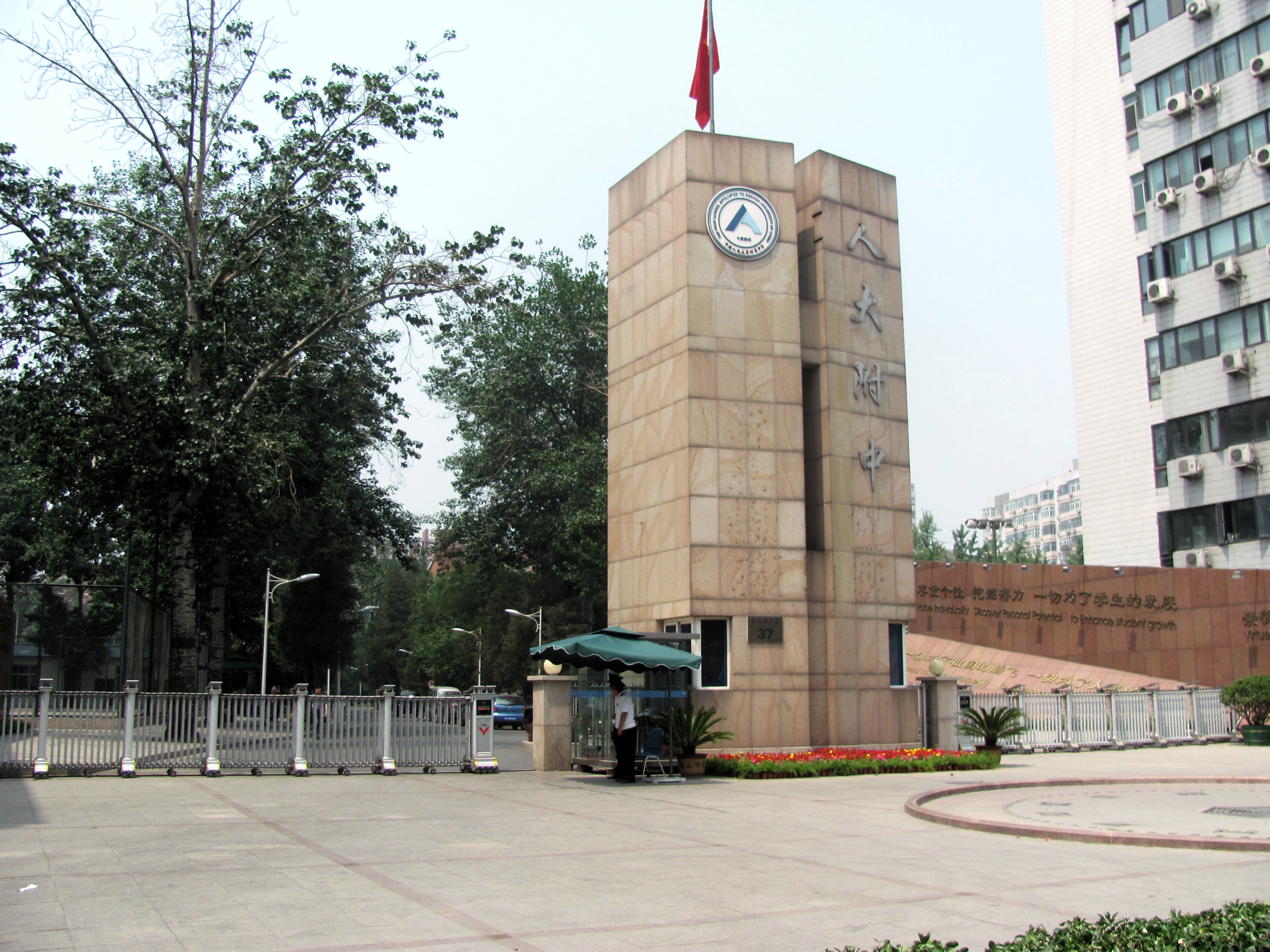
The school's entrance, 2012

The High School Affiliated to Renmin University of China (RDFZ; 中国人民大学附属中学) is a public high school in Haidian, Beijing, China. It is affiliated with the Renmin University of China.

== History ==
The school was established on April 3, 1950 as the Beijing Experimental Accelerated Middle School for Workers and Farmers (北京实验工农速成中学); though plans to create an experimental school for Beijing's growing population existed as early as January of that year. Created by the Chinese Ministry of Education, which had been formally established only a year earlier, the school was used to further develop China's education system.

In 1952, the school became affiliated with Renmin University of China and was renamed to Workers and Farmers' Accelerated Middle School Attached to Renmin University of China (中国人民大学附设工农速成中学). In 1955, the school broadened its student population beyond workers and farmers and broadened its curriculum to include traditional high school classes. In 1956, the school was again renamed, this time to Workers' and Farmers' High School Affiliated to Renmin University of China, a name that was kept until 1960, when the name was finally changed to its current name, the High School Affiliated to Renmin University of China.

With Renmin University of China closed by the Beijing Revolutionary Committee during the Cultural Revolution in October 1970, the school briefly changed its name to Beijing Middle School No. 172. When Renmin University of China reopened in 1978, the school reaffirmed its affiliation to the university and the school's name was changed back.

A 2012 article in The New York Times alleged that the school was one of many in China to illegally accept bribes to admit students; however, this claim was denied by school officials.

== Structure ==
=== Administration ===
The school is also a branch of RDFZ United, an administrative body presiding over a number of schools internationally. Besides RDFZ, there are more than ten schools under the administration of RDFZ United. For example, the Shenzhen Branch of the High School Affiliated to the Renmin University of China (中国人民大学附属中学深圳分校) is a new secondary school established in 2017 in Shenzhen, Guangdong.

RDFZ United is one of the few Chinese educational organizations that have branches located outside mainland China. Princeton International School of Mathematics and Science, created by a joint venture between Chinese investor Jiang Bairong and RDFZ, is a member of RDFZ United located in Princeton, New Jersey.

Because the growing number of schools that fall under the administration of RDFZ United, a council was created to formalize the management structure of RDFZ United. Council members are mainly officials from Renmin University of China. RUC President is an ex officio member. RDFZ United's founding principal Liu Pengzhi is the chancellor of the Council. Among others, Vice President of RUC, Dean of RUC School of Law, and Principal of RDFZ are also elected to the Council.

=== Staff ===
The staff includes 50 special-class teachers and over 170 senior-level teachers. 16 teachers have been conferred the title of "pillar teacher" at the national level, and another 25 at the Beijing municipal level. 37 are recognized as advanced individuals in their disciplines in Haidian District. There are more than 40 foreign teachers from the United States, the United Kingdom and other countries.

School principals
Term	Name
Hu Chaozhi (胡朝芝)	1950–1956
Xia Jia (夏加)	1956–1959
Di Wenyu (邸文彧)	1960–1962
Chen Bangyou (陈邦友)	1967–1969
Wu Yingjie (吴英杰)	1971–1978
Dong Fang (董放)	1983–1984
Hu Junze (胡俊泽)	1984–1992
Zhu Disheng (朱迪生)	1992–1997
Liu Pengzhi (刘彭芝)	1997–2019 2019–present (Principal Emeritus)
Zhai Xiaoning (翟小宁)	2014–2019
Liu Xiaohui (刘小惠)	2019–present

=== Students ===
Foreign passport holders are allowed to attend so long as they have legal guardians residing in Beijing for the duration of their enrollment.

== Rankings ==
RDFZ consistently ranks among the top of Chinese high schools. In a 2016 ranking of Chinese high schools that send students to study in American universities, the school ranked fifth in mainland China in terms of the number of students entering top American universities.

== Exchange program ==
RDFZ has an international student exchange program stretching across four continents. Visits are arranged for students and teachers annually between RDFZ and its sister schools listed below.

=== Asia ===
- Shanghai Datong High School, Shanghai, China
- Hou Kong Middle School, Macau, China
- Maryknoll Convent School (Secondary Section), Hong Kong, China
- La Salle College, Hong Kong, China
- Heep Yunn School, Hong Kong, China
- Holy Trinity College, Hong Kong, China
- Fukien Secondary School, Hong Kong, China
- Daewon Foreign Language High School, Seoul, South Korea
- Hana Academy Seoul, Seoul, South Korea
- Musashi Junior and Senior High School, Tokyo, Japan
- Ikeda Senior High School Attached to Osaka Kyoiku University, Osaka, Japan
- Hagoromo Gakuen Junior College, Osaka, Japan
- Kitayodokoto School, Osaka, Japan
- School of Science and Technology, Singapore, Singapore
- Raffles Institution, Singapore
- Raffles Girls' School (Secondary), Singapore
- Mahidol University International Demonstration School, Bangkok, Thailand

=== Europe ===
- Niels Steensens Gymnasium, Copenhagen, Denmark
- Rungsted Boarding School, Rungsted, Denmark
- Ekenäs Gymnasium, Ekenäs, Finland
- Kantonsschule am Burggraben St. Gallen, St. Gallen, Switzerland
- Ferdinand Porsche Gymnasium, Stuttgart, Germany
- Belvedere College SJ, Dublin, Ireland
- Hamelin Laie International School, Barcelona, Spain
- British Council School, Madrid, Spain
- Harrow School, Harrow, London, United Kingdom
- Eton College, Eton, Berkshire, United Kingdom
- The Emmbrook School, Wokingham, Berkshire, United Kingdom
- The Holt School, Wokingham, Berkshire, United Kingdom
- The Piggott School, Wargrave, Berkshire, United Kingdom
- Wellington College, Crowthorne, Berkshire, United Kingdom

=== Americas ===
- Whitney M. Young Magnet High School, Chicago, Illinois, United States
- Phillips Andover Academy, Andover, Massachusetts, United States
- Phillips Exeter Academy, Exeter, New Hampshire, United States
- Punahou School, Honolulu, Hawaii, United States
- Georgetown Day School, Washington, D.C., United States
- Thomas Jefferson High School for Science and Technology, Fairfax County, Virginia, United States
- Illinois Mathematics and Science Academy, Aurora, Illinois, United States
- Tabor Academy, Marion, Massachusetts, United States

=== Oceania ===
- Trinity Grammar School, Sydney, Australia

== Notable alumni ==
- Hao Jianxiu (郝建秀) – CPPCC Vice Chairman
- Han Xu (韩叙) – Chinese Ambassador to the United States
- Song Demin (宋德敏) – CPPCC Chief Secretary
- Liu Zheng (刘政) – CPPCC Vice Chief Secretary
- Wei Jingsheng (魏京生) – human rights activist
- Dai Wei (戴威) – founder of Ofo
- Liu Qing (柳青) – president of Didi Chuxing
- Keyu Jin
- Cheng Congfu (程丛夫) – racing driver
- Hou Yifan (侯逸凡) – Chinese chess grandmaster
- Zhang Peimeng (张培萌) – track and field sprinter
- Yang Peiyi (杨沛宜) – teenage singer
- Fung, Kai Stephanie, daughter of Mao Amin.
- Zhang Nuanxin (张暖忻) – film director
- Chloé Zhao (赵婷) – film director
- Xu Qing (许晴) – actress

== Alumni Associations ==
The school has two alumni associations:

- Mainland Alumni Association, targeting alumni living in China (predominantly in Beijing), is headquartered in the Main Campus.
- International Alumni Association, targeting members of the RDFZ diaspora outside of mainland China, is founded in Harvard University in Cambridge, Massachusetts in 2008. The New York branch holds annual functions in spring.
