= Frontiers of Computer Science =

- Discipline: Computer science, general
- Language: English
- Edited by: Wei LI, Zhang XIONG, Zhi-Hua ZHOU

Publication details
- History: 2007 till present
- Publisher: Springer and Higher Education Press
- Frequency: bimonthly
- Impact factor: 1.039 (2016)

Standard abbreviations
- ISO 4: Front. Comput. Sci.

Indexing
- ISSN: 2095-2228 (print); 2095-2236 (web)

Links
- Journal homepage

Frontiers of Computer Science is a bimonthly peer-reviewed scientific journal in English, co-published by Springer and Higher Education Press. It publishes research papers, review articles, and letters in computer science, including system architecture, software, artificial intelligence, theoretical computer science, networks and communication, information systems, multimedia and graphics, information security, etc. The editor-in-chief is Wei LI (Beihang University, China); the executive editors-in-chief are Zhang XIONG (Beihang University, China) and Zhi-Hua ZHOU (Nanjing University, China).

== Abstracting and indexing ==
The journal is abstracted and indexed in:

- Science Citation Index Expanded (SciSearch)
- Journal Citation Reports/Science Edition
- SCOPUS
- INSPEC
- Zentralblatt Math
- Google Scholar
- ACM Digital Library
- Chinese Science Citation Database
- Current Contents/Engineering
- Computing and Technology
- DBLP
- EI-Compendex
- Expanded Academic
- OCLC
- SCImago
