= Chinese Social Sciences Citation Index =

Academic citation index program in China

- Producer: Nanking University; Hong Kong University of Science and Technology
- History: 1998; 27 years ago
- Languages: Chinese

Coverage
- Disciplines: Social sciences
- Record depth: Index & citation indexing

Links
- Website: cssci.nju.edu.cn
- Title list(s): cssrac.nju.edu.cn/cpzx/zwshkxywsy/20210425/i198393.html

Chinese Social Sciences Citation Index (CSSCI, Chinese: 中文社会科学引文索引) is an interdisciplinary citation index program in China. It was developed by Nanjing University's Institute for Social Sciences Research and Assessment (中国社会科学研究评价中心) and the Hong Kong University of Science and Technology in 1998 and was established in 2000. This citation database covers about 500 Chinese academic journals of humanities and social sciences. Now many leading Chinese universities and institutes use CSSCI as a basis for the evaluation of academic achievements and promotion.

According to a 2017 book written by Junping Qiu and other authors, CSSCI "is an important research project of the state and Ministry of Education and an important tool for information inquiry and evaluation of the main documents and information in China." The book said that CSSCI "addresses the blanks" in the Social Sciences Citation Index.

Jiangqiu Ge wrote in a 2019 book that people from Nanjin University choose "the top journals with high academic quality from thousands of journals in China". Criteria include how influential the journals are, how often they are quoted, and assessments from specialists. Another criterion is that the journal should have been regularly publishing articles for at least five years. Authors generally consider journals indexed in the CSSCI to be superior so favour writing articles for those journals. Lecturers and associate professors' career advancement is reliant on how many CSSCI journal articles they have written. The 2017–2018 edition of the index had 23 CSSCI law journals.

== See also ==
- List of academic databases and search engines
- A Guide to the Core Journals of China
- AMI Comprehensive Evaluation Report
- Chinese Science Citation Database
- Social Sciences Citation Index
- Arts and Humanities Citation Index
