= Wu Guoguang =

Chinese scholar

- Born: 1957 (age 68–69); Linyi, Shandong, China
- Occupations: Scholar, Author
- Employer: Stanford University
- Website: Profile at Stanford University

Wu Guoguang (simplified Chinese: 吴国光; traditional Chinese: 吳國光; pinyin: Wú Guóguāng; Wade–Giles: Wu Kuo-kuang, born in 1957 in Linyi, Shandong, China) is a Senior Research Scholar at Stanford University, affiliated with the Stanford Center on China's Economy and Institutions (SCCEI). SCCEI, a collaboration between the Freeman Spogli Institute for International Studies (FSI) and the Stanford Institute for Economic Policy Research (SIEPR), aims to link advanced empirical research on China's economy with policies that shape U.S.-China economic, trade, and business relations. He also serves as a Senior Fellow on Chinese Politics at the Center for China Analysis (CCA) of the Asia Society Policy Institute (ASPI).

Wu is a media commentator on China's current affairs. His research focuses on Chinese politics and comparative political economy, covering areas such as elite politics, national institutions, policy making, communism transition, development politics, China's global positioning, capitalism's evolution with globalization, comparative capitalism origins, the economic state's rise, and human security's global emergence.

== Life ==
=== 1957-1989 ===
Wu was born in 1957 in Linyi, Shandong, China to the parents of rural teachers. His elementary school education was interrupted in 1966 by the Cultural Revolution, then, in the early 1970s, he received incomplete middle- and high school education before becoming a sent-down youth in 1975. After the death of Mao Zedong, he entered a factory as a textile worker. In winter 1977, through the first-time normal university admission examinations in China since 1966, Wu came to Beijing for attending Peking University with specialization on journalism. Subsequently he received a BA in journalism from Peking University (1982) and a MA in journalism/political commentary from the Graduate School of the Chinese Academy of Social Sciences (1984). After a stint being secretary to the president of the Chinese Academy of Social Sciences, he joined the People's Daily, where he had been a directorial editor of the desk of editorial and political commentary before he was purged in 1989.

In 1986, when the Chinese Communist Party prepared its 13th National Congress (conveyed in October 1987), Wu joined the Office of the Central Seminar Group on Political Reform under the leadership of Zhao Ziyang and Bao Tong, and participated in the policy discussion, design, and formulation of the policy package on China’s political reform for an attempt to transform the Chinese one-party dictatorship to open politics with citizens’ rights, rule of law, and, in the long run, democracy. Wu was one of the drafters of the report that Zhao delivered on behalf of the Central Committee to the 13th Party Congress, and a major drafter of the policy document on political reform that was later adopted by the 13th Party Congress. In the years following the 13th Party Congress, Wu continued to be a member of the drafting groups headed by Bao Tong for formulating various Central-Committee documents and Zhao’s speeches, including the Politburo’s reports to the 13th Central Committee’s 2nd and 3rd plenary meetings. A decade later Wu published a book based on his working notes, Zhao Ziyang and Political Reform, which recorded and disclosed internal policy discussions during the period.

A highlight of Wu’s role as Zhao’s speech writer occurred in spring 1987. Along with the step-down of Hu Yaobang, the CCP’s reform-minded General Secretary, in January 1987, a campaign of “anti-bourgeois liberalization” swept China, which tried to push back China’s economic and political transitions from communism. Zhao Ziyang, as new General Secretary of the CCP, made difficult efforts at maintaining the reform momentum. After gaining the support from Deng Xiaoping, China’s paramount leader at the time, Zhao delivered a speech on May 13, 1987, which was celebrated by its effects of muting the campaign while revitalizing reforms. Wu was the major drafter of this speech of Zhao, known as the “May 13 speech.” From then on, Wu was viewed by his colleagues as “the first pen” of Zhao’s group under Bao Tong.

Wu during the period concurrently served as an editorialist of The People’s Daily, to which he drafted numerous editorials, commentator’s articles, and other journalistic works. For example, he drafted the editorial “Bringing Political Reform onto Agenda,” published in the newspaper on July 1, 1987. He also widely published in various fields, primarily on Hegelian and Marxist philosophies, criticism of contemporary Chinese literature, studies of classic Chinese novel The Red Chamber Dream, and essays on current affairs. In the years 1986-1988, he won several national prizes of essay writing, including the golden medal of the Lu Xun Cup in essay writing.

=== Since 1989 ===
Wu was interviewed about the Tiananmen protests in the documentary film The Gate of Heavenly Peace. He in fact left China for the United States in February 1989, prior to the rise of the protests, first for English language training, then attended Harvard University as a Nieman Fellow (1989-1990).

As completing his Nieman program in summer 1990, Wu found he was not able to return to China, as, in the months following the Tiananmen Crackdown in June 1989, he was purged from The People’s Daily and his residence in Beijing was searched and sealed by secret police. He was such punished because of his connection to Zhao, who was purged in late May 1989 and died in life-time house-prison in 2005, his publications during the 1980s for criticizing dictatorship and advocating institutional reform in China, and his involvement in overseas Chinese democracy movements that had arisen with the exile of some Tiananmen student activists and leading Chinese pro-democracy intellectuals.

Wu was then appointed as a Luce Fellow (1990-1991) at Columbia University, working under the supervision of Professor Andrew J. Nathan. Subsequently, he obtained a M.A. (1993) and a PhD (1995) in political science from Princeton University, with Professor Lynn T. White, III, as his thesis supervisor. Following an appointment as a An Wang Post-Doctoral Fellow (1995-1996) at the John King Fairbank Center for East Asian Research at Harvard University, he joined the Department of Government and Public Administration at the Chinese University of Hong Kong in 1996 as an assistant professor and, six years later, an associate professor. He witnessed transition of Hong Kong to China’s sovereignty, and wrote newspaper columns for contributing his insights on Chinese politics.

In 2004, Wu moved to Canada for joining the University of Victoria, where he concurrently served as Chair in China and Asia-Pacific Relations at Centre for Asia-Pacific Initiatives, Professor in Department of Political Science, and Professor in Department of History.

In 2022, Wu joined Stanford University with the current appointment.

Wu in exile keeps as a voice of advocating political change of China toward democratization. In 1989, following the Tiananmen crackdown, he joined the exiled activists of the Beijing pro-democracy movement in Paris, France for establishing a major overseas dissident organization. Later he was involved in a project sponsored by Center for Modern China in Princeton, New Jersey for exploring the future of a democratic China. In Hong Kong, he frequently talked at events organized by local democratic activists; before being muted by the CCP in 2003, he had commentary columns in major Chinese-language newspapers for observing China’s development and criticizing CCP governance. He is thought a sober brain of China’s dissident forces.

Lately Wu turned to proposing for building up liberal communities among overseas Chinese, which, in his imagination, might help to make a less authoritarian, less-CCP-influenced but more cosmopolitan culture for Chinese diaspora, and provide democratic training for global citizens of Chinese ethnicity and for future Chinese citizens as democracy is practiced in China.

== Family ==
Guoguang Wu married to Xiaoying Liao, a writer on education and environment who obtained a Ph.D. in mass communication from Université Paris II Panthéon-Assas. They have two sons.

== Academics ==
Wu started his academic publications in the English language in 1993. His early articles in the regard include a China Quarterly article, which is now a quasi-classic in studies of China’s political communication, and a book chapter on what he termed as “documentary politics,” a piece highly regarded in China’s circle of political science. Both drew research materials from his own experience in China and his first-hand observation of relevant subjects, providing an insider-scholar’s perspective to reflect on information processing in CCP politics.

Wu’s doctoral dissertation, entitled Hard Politics with Soft Institutions: China’s Political Reform, 1986-1989, examines the failure of China’s political reform in the late 1980s, obviously also closely relevant to his experience in China.

His major research monographs came out late, however. In 2015, Cambridge University Press published Wu’s book on China’s Party Congress, which seems continuing his effort at reflecting on Chinese political institutional operations that he was once familiar as an insider, but his propensity of theorization of Chinese politics at the level of dialoguing with Western classic political thinkers is much displayed in the discussions of legitimacy, inter-regime institutional fertilization, institutional manipulation (as being differentiated from political manipulation), and theatrical politics. The investigation on the CCP electoral system is a fascinating part of the book. The book is also published in the Chinese and Japanese editions through translation.

Wu lately extends his specialties to much wider fields, from politics to political economy and from China studies to global capitalism. His 2017 monograph, Globalization Against Democracy, also from Cambridge University Press, is, in his own words, an “intellectual adventure” that explores how the global triumph of capitalism with the end of the Cold War transformed macro institutions of capitalism per se and their increasingly negative connections with democracy and democratization. It argues that, with the global extension of capitalism across state borders, capitalism has been decoupled from its previous political shell that is democracy, which remains within the scale of a nation-state. Wu portraits this as the “political nakedness” in which capitalism runs without corresponding political institutions. Political authoritarianism, therefore, gains advantages in dealing with capitalism, hijacking capital with authoritarian regimes’ concentrated administrative power in politically charged national-market admission and with its statist monopoly of resources for winning global competitions. Wu’s theory of the economic state is praised by a reviewer; the book’s investigation of mass consumption, as well as capital and labor, is especially insightful. It is an ambitious book that is obviously influenced by the diverse, classic traditions of Max Weber, Karl Marx, and Adam Smith.

Wu has developed his unique methodology in the above research projects, which is termed “mutual contextualization” with the emphasis of interactions of two great factors, or, two series of great factors, in focusing its analysis on a chosen subject. He expects to apply the methodology for overcoming linear approach and static thinking.

Wu’s academic research also widely covers various subjects, such as China’s foreign policy, Chinese nationalism, social discontents and social protests, and feminist movements in China. In recent years, he published a series of analyses on China’s leadership politics, which are frequently quoted by global mass media.

== Publications ==
He has authored four English-language books, such as China’s Party Congress: Power, Legitimacy, and Institutional Manipulation (2015) and Globalization against Democracy: A Political Economy of Capitalism After its Global Triumph (2017), both published by Cambridge University Press. Additionally, he has edited or co-edited six English-language volumes and nearly 20 books in Chinese. His academic articles have been featured in various journals including Asian Survey, China Information, China Perspectives, China Quarterly, Comparative Political Studies, Journal of Contemporary China, Journal of Democracy, Pacific Review, Social Research, and Third World Quarterly.

He regularly contributes to The China Leadership Monitor and Decoding Chinese Politics on the CCA website, and writes a column for Voice of America in Chinese. His works have been translated into French, Japanese, and Korean.

=== Books ===
- Guoguang Wu, Globalization against Democracy: A Political Economy of Capitalism after Its Global Triumph, Cambridge: Cambridge University Press, 2017.
  - The Chinese edition of Globalization against Democracy (translated by Zhao Can), Oxford University Press, 2020.
- Guoguang Wu, China's Party Congress: Power, Legitimacy, and Institutional Manipulation, Cambridge: Cambridge University Press, 2015.
  - The Chinese edition of China’s Party Congress (translated by Zhao Can), Hong Kong: Chinese University Press, 2018.
  - The Japanese edition of China’s Party Congress (translated by Tomoki Kamo), Tokyo: Chuokoron-Shinsha, 2023.
- Guoguang Wu, Paradoxes of China's Prosperity: Domestic Dilemmas and Global Implications, Singapore: World Scientific, 2015.
- Guoguang Wu, The Anatomy of Political Power in China, Singapore: Marshall Cavendish Academic, 2005.

=== Edited works ===
- Guoguang Wu, guest editor, “Institutional Transformation of Capitalism in the Age of Globalization,” A special issue of the journal of Social Sciences 11, 5 (2022).
- Guoguang Wu, Yuan Feng and Helen Lansdowne eds., Gender Dynamics, Feminist Activism and Social Transition in China, London: Routledge, 2019.
- Guoguang Wu and Helen Lansdowne eds., China's Transition from Communism—New Perspectives, London: Routledge, 2016.
- Guoguang Wu ed., China's Challenges to Human Security: Foreign Relations and Global Implications, London: Routledge, 2013.
- Guoguang Wu and Helen Lansdowne eds., Socialist China, Capitalist China: Social Tension and Political Adaptation under Economic Globalization, London: Routledge, 2009.
- Guoguang Wu and Helen Lansdowne eds., Zhao Ziyang and China's Political Future, London: Routledge, 2008.
- Guoguang Wu and Helen Lansdowne eds., China Turns to Multilateralism: Foreign Policy and Regional Security, London: Routledge, 2008.
