= China Perspectives =

- Discipline: Chinese studies
- Language: English, French

Publication details
- Former names: Bulletin Mensuel; Bulletin de sinologie
- History: 1992–present
- Publisher: French Centre for Research on Contemporary China (Hong Kong)
- Frequency: Quarterly

Standard abbreviations
- ISO 4: China Perspect.

Indexing
- ISSN: 1011-2006 (print); 1996-4617 (web)
- JSTOR: 20703449

Links
- Journal homepage; China Perspectives at Revues.org; Perspectives chinoises at Revues.org

China Perspectives (French: Perspectives chinoises) is a peer-reviewed quarterly academic journal that provides interdisciplinary analysis of developments in the contemporary Chinese world, including People's Republic of China, Taiwan, Hong Kong and Macau.

== History ==
China Perspectives
- Traditional Chinese: 神州展望
- Simplified Chinese: 神州展望
Transcriptions
Standard Mandarin
- Hanyu Pinyin: Shénzhōu Zhǎnwàng

The predecessor to the journal was the Bulletin Mensuel, published by the Hong Kong branch of the French Centre for Research on Sinology between 1979 and 1983, followed by the Bulletin de sinologie from 1983 to 1992. During the 1980s and 1990s, the publication provided first-hand data and information on China in both French and English, before gradually evolving into a more scholarly publication.

Perspectives chinoises was created and first published in 1992 by Michel Bonnin (Editor-in-Chief from 1992 to 1998), Jean-Philippe Béja and Raphaël Jacquet. It was launched by the French Centre for Research on Contemporary China (CEFC), a Hong Kong-based research institute that is part of a network of 27 public research centers under the aegis of the French Ministry of Foreign Affairs and the French National Centre for Scientific Research.

China Perspectives was launched in 1995 as the English version of the French-language academic journal created in 1992. The two versions were published jointly until 2022; starting in 2023, only the English edition is published.

== Editors-in-Chief ==
- 1995-1999: Raphaël Jacquet
- 1999-2003: Éric Sautedé
- 2003-2006: Patricia Batto
- 2006-2010: Sébastien Billioud
- 2010-2013: Pierre-Henry de Bruyn
- 2013-2017: Séverine Arsène
- 2017-2021: Judith Audin
- 2021-2022: Laurent Chircop
- 2023-2025: Marie Bellot
- 2026-: Camille Salgues

== Abstracting and indexing ==
This journal is indexed and abstracted in the following databases:

- Social Sciences Citation Index
- Current Contents/Social and Behavioral Sciences
- Scopus
- Academic Search Premier
- International Bibliography of the Social Sciences
- PAIS International
- Worldwide Political Science Abstracts
- ERIH PLUS
- HCERES
