= Higher Education Press =

Textbook publishing company in China

Higher Education Press 高等教育出版社
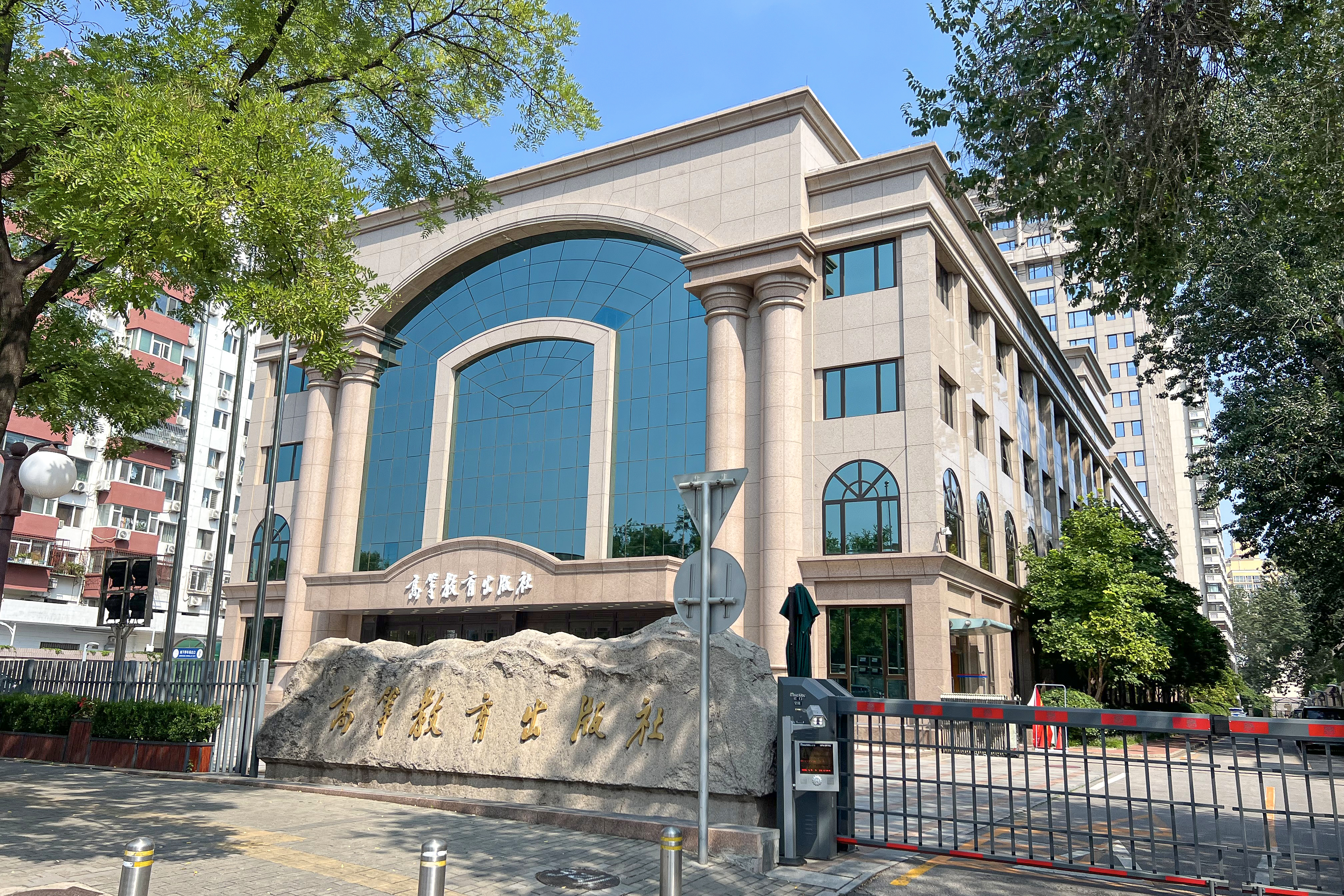
- Headquarters (2023)
- Parent company: China Education Publishing & Media
- Country of origin: China
- Headquarters location: 4 Deshengmen Outer Street, Xicheng District, Beijing, China
- Publication types: Books, journals
- Owner: Ministry of Education (China)
- Official website: www.hep.com.cn

Higher Education Press (HEP) is a publisher in China of university and college-level textbooks, owned by Ministry of Education of the People's Republic of China. The company's headquarters is in Beijing.

HEP partnered with ScienceOpen in April 2016, indexing one of its flagship open-access journals Frontiers of Agricultural Science and Engineering (FASE).

== Journals published ==
- Engineering
- Frontiers of Architectural Research
- Frontiers in Biology
- Frontiers of Computer Science
- Frontiers in Energy
- Frontiers of Law in China
- Frontiers of Medicine
- Frontiers of Physics
- Protein & Cell

== See also ==
- List of companies of China
- Lists of publishing companies
- People's Education Press
