= Protein & Cell =

- Discipline: Cell biology
- Language: English
- Edited by: Zihe Rao

Publication details
- History: 2010-present
- Publisher: Oxford University Press
- Frequency: Monthly
- Open access: Yes
- Impact factor: 13.6 (2023)

Standard abbreviations
- ISO 4: Protein Cell

Indexing
- CODEN: PCREFB
- ISSN: 1674-800X (print); 1674-8018 (web)
- LCCN: 2014254504
- OCLC no.: 865290367

Links
- Journal homepage; Online archive

Protein & Cell is a monthly peer-reviewed open access journal covering protein and cell biology. It was established in 2010 and is published by Springer Science+Business Media. The editor-in-chief is Zihe Rao (Nankai University). According to the Journal Citation Reports, the journal has a 2018 impact factor of 7.575.

== Genetic modification of human embryos controversy ==
In 2015, the journal sparked controversy when it published a paper reporting results of an attempt to alter the DNA of non-viable human embryos to correct a mutation that causes beta thalassemia, a lethal heritable disorder. According to the paper's lead author, the paper had previously been rejected by both Nature and Science in part because of ethical concerns; the journals did not comment to reporters.
