= French Centre for Research on Contemporary China =

Hong Kong-based research institute

The French Centre for Research on Contemporary China (Centre d'études français sur la Chine contemporaine, CEFC) is a research center focused on contemporary China, based in Hong Kong. It is affiliated with the French National Centre for Scientific Research (CNRS) and the Ministry for Europe and Foreign Affairs. It is part of the Instituts Français de Recherche à l'Etranger.

== History ==
The Centre was founded in Hong Kong in 1991. It houses a library of classic social science works on China, Hong Kong, and Macau, available in French, English, and Chinese. It publishes a quarterly research journal, China Perspectives (Perspectives chinoises), dedicated to contemporary China.

In 1994, Jean-Pierre Cabestan opened a branch in Taipei, Taiwan. It has been hosted by Academia Sinica since 1998.

In July 2011, a research center—the Franco-Chinese Centre (Centre franco-chinois)—was founded in Beijing. It became affiliated with the CEFC in March 2014 and is hosted by Tsinghua University. Individual researchers are also based in mainland China.

== Directors ==
- 1991–1998: Michel Bonnin
- 1998–2003: Jean-Pierre Cabestan
- 2003–2006: Gilles Guiheux
- 2006–2011: Jean-François Huchet
- 2011–2015: Sebastian Veg
- 2015–2019: Eric Florence
- 2019–2023: Pierre Miège
- 2023–2025: Benjamin Taunay
- Since 2026: Florence Padovani
