= Hamelin Laie International School =

Private school in Montgat, Spain

Hamelin-Laie International School
- Motto: Nihil humani alienum est
- Type: Private School
- Established: 1989; 37 years ago
- Academic affiliations: Nord Anglia Education
- President: Sonia Sas
- Academic staff: 150
- Students: 1400
- Location: Montgat, Spain; 41.4744°N 2.2901°E
- Colors
- Website: hamelinschool.com

Hamelin Laie International School is a private international boarding school located in Montgat, Spain, near Barcelona. The school was founded in 1989 and teaches infant education, primary education, secondary education and baccalaureate. In 2022 it joined the family of private schools North Anglia Education.

== History ==
=== Alella (1989-2014) ===
Hamelin-Laie began as a family enterprise founded by the current school's president Sonia Sas's grandfather in the aftermath of the Spanish Civil War. It became the first school in the country to offer instruction in three languages – English, Spanish and Catalan – under the leadership of Sonia Sas's mother in 1989.The learning institution was originally located in the town of Alella. It consisted of two different buildings complexes: Hamelin and Laie. Hamelin, branded as orange, focused on early education (nursery and primary education). Its facilities were located in the historic building Vil·la Martorell. Meanwhile Laie, branded as deep blue, focused on secondary education. Both schools were part of the Escoles Sas group.

=== Montgat (2016-present) ===
Hamelin Alella

Escola Laie

Hamelin-Laie

In 2014 it was announced that the schools would be merging into Hamelin-Laie and the construction of a new campus on the near town of Montgat began. The building was carried out by the Alonso & Balaguer architecture studio (ABAA). In 2016 the facilities were completed. While now both Hamelin and Laie in a same building, they still remained with their own identity colors. Nevertheless, they abandoned their respective old logos and incorporated a new unified logo by Edgar Cueto.

=== Nord Anglia Education (2022-present) ===
In 2022 Hamelin-Laie became part of Nord Anglia Education, being the second school in Spain. In consequence, the institution has access to the Nord Anglia Global Campus. While the school remained its name and overall branding its logo was redesigned to be more streamlined with the brand identity of Nord Anglia Education.

== Education ==
Hamelin Laie International School is a school approved by the MEC. In addition, in highschool it offers the National Baccalaureate and the International Baccalaureate (IB). The school has been an IB recognized institution since 2013. Within the school grounds there is the Boarding Campus, the Hamelin Laie Language School and the Dance School Laie.
