= Late Imperial China (journal) =

- Discipline: Asian studies, History
- Language: English
- Edited by: Tobie Meyer-Fong, Janet Theiss

Publication details
- Former names: Ch'ing-shih wen-t'i (1965–1984)
- History: 1965-present
- Publisher: Johns Hopkins University Press (United States)
- Frequency: Biannually

Standard abbreviations
- ISO 4: Late Imp. China

Indexing
- ISSN: 0884-3236 (print); 1086-3257 (web)
- OCLC no.: 33892972

Links
- Journal homepage; Online access

Late Imperial China, formerly Ch'ing-shih wen-t'i (清史問題) until 1984, is a peer-reviewed academic journal established in 1965. It specializes in research on the Ming and Qing dynasties. The journal includes methodologically novel techniques in the study of political, intellectual, social, and gender history as well as historical demography. Articles include a Chinese glossary. The journal is published biannually by the Johns Hopkins University Press since 1993.

== Abstracting and indexing ==
This journal is abstracted and indexed in the following databases:

- Arts & Humanities Citation Index
- Current Contents
- Web of Science
- Scopus
- De Gruyter Saur databases
- EBSCOhost databases
- PubMed
- ProQuest databases

== See also ==
- Journal of Song-Yuan Studies
