= Frontiers of Biogeography =

Scientific journal

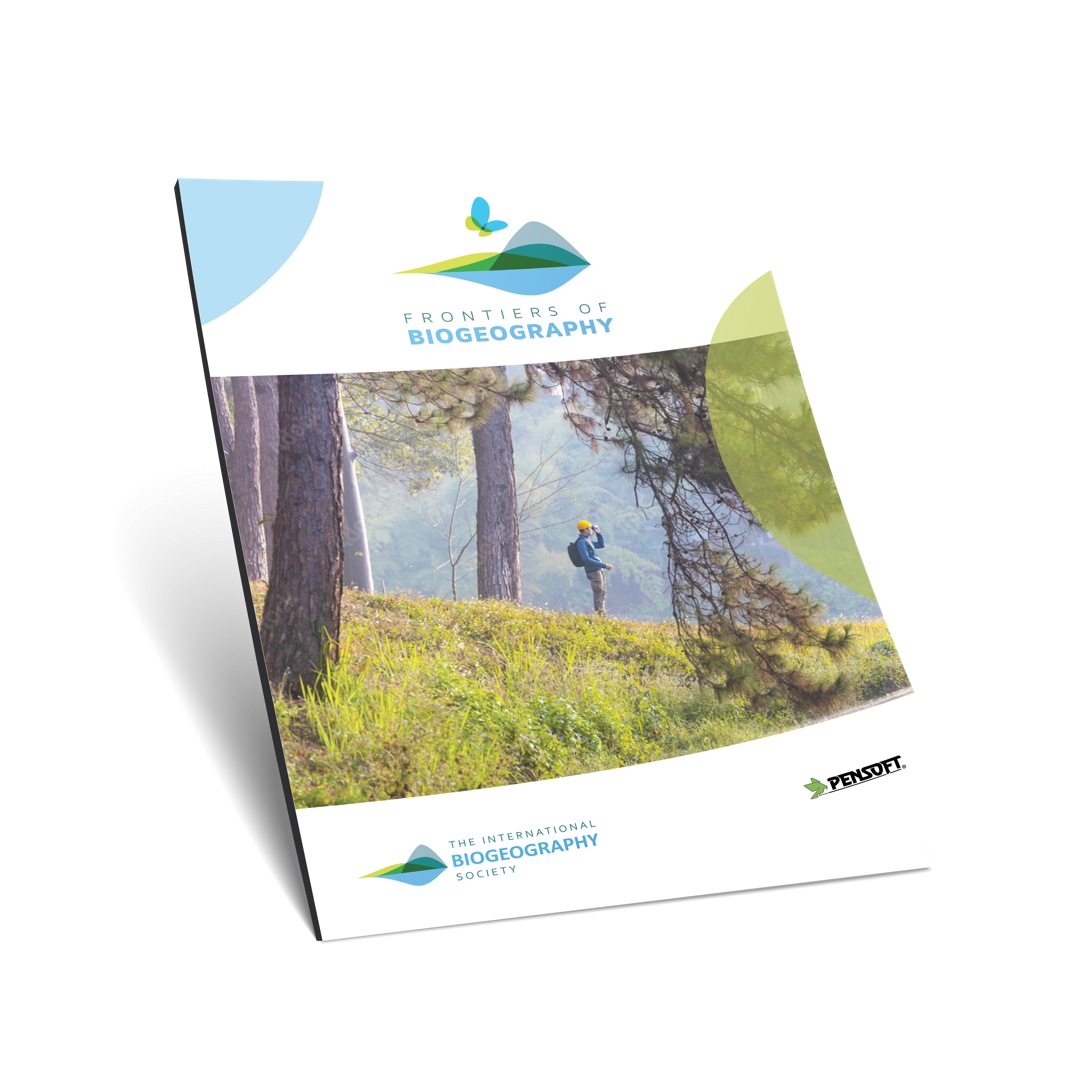
- Discipline: Biogeography
- Language: English
- Edited by: Robert Whittaker

Publication details
- History: 2009–present
- Publisher: Pensoft Publishers
- Open access: Yes
- License: Creative Commons Attribution License
- Impact factor: 2.5 (2024)

Standard abbreviations
- ISO 4: Front. Biogeogr.

Indexing
- ISSN: 1948-6596
- OCLC no.: 334391382

Links
- Journal homepage

Frontiers of Biogeography (FoB) is the scientific journal of The International Biogeography Society (TIBS, biogeography.org), a not-for-profit organization dedicated to the promotion, and public understanding, of the biogeographical sciences. TIBS launched FoB in 2009 to provide an independent forum for biogeographical science, with the academic standards expected of a journal operated by and for an academic society. It is published by Pensoft Publishers on behalf of the International Biogeography Society using the ARPHA Publishing platform. The current Editor-in-Chief is Robert J. Whittaker.

== Abstracting and indexing ==
The journal is abstracted and indexed in the Web of Science, Scopus, and the Directory of Open Access Journals (DOAJ) amongst over 60 scientific literature databases. In 2025, it received its inaugural Journal Impact Factor of 2.5, placing the journal in the Q2 of both the Ecology and Physical Geography categories.
