= Frontiers of Medicine =

- Discipline: Medicine
- Language: English
- Edited by: S. Chen, B. Yang, X. Chen

Publication details
- Former name(s): Frontiers of Medicine in China
- History: 2007-present
- Publisher: Higher Education Press, Springer Science+Business Media
- Impact factor: 1.634 (2016)

Standard abbreviations
- ISO 4: Front. Med.

Indexing
- ISSN: 2095-0217 (print); 2095-0225 (web)
- LCCN: 2011243429
- OCLC no.: 728100187

Links
- Journal homepage; Online archive

Frontiers of Medicine is a peer-reviewed online-only general medical journal published jointly by the Chinese Higher Education Press and Springer Science+Business Media. It was established in 2007 as Frontiers of Medicine in China, obtaining its current name in 2011. The editors-in-chief are S. Chen (Ruijin Hospital), B. Yang (Harbin Medical University), and X. Chen (Tongji Medical College). According to the Journal Citation Reports, the journal has a 2016 impact factor of 1.634.
