= Journal of Song-Yuan Studies =

- Discipline: Asian studies, Chinese history
- Language: English
- Edited by: Don J. Wyatt; Linda Walton (former)

Publication details
- Former names: Journal of Sung-Yuan Studies (1990–2000); Bulletin of Sung-Yuan Studies (1978–1989); Sung Studies Newsletter (1970–1977)
- History: 1970–present
- Publisher: Society for Song, Yuan, and Conquest Dynasty Studies; Institute of East Asian Studies, University of California, Berkeley; (United States)
- Frequency: Annually

Standard abbreviations
- ISO 4: J. Song-Yuan Stud.

Indexing
- ISSN: 1059-3152
- JSTOR: jsongyuanstud
- OCLC no.: 402782007

Links
- Journal homepage

Journal of Song-Yuan Studies, known as Journal of Sung-Yuan Studies from 1990 to 2000, Bulletin of Sung-Yuan Studies from 1978 to 1989, and Sung Studies Newsletter from 1970 to 1977, is an American academic journal on "middle imperial Chinese history" or Chinese history from the 10th to 14th centuries, specifically the Five Dynasties period, Liao dynasty, Song dynasty, Western Xia, Jin dynasty (1115–1234), and Yuan dynasty.

== See also ==
- Late Imperial China (journal)
