= Xiaogang Wu =

Chinese sociologist

- 吴晓刚
- Occupation: Sociologist

Academic background
- Education: Renmin University of China (BA, 1991); Peking University (MA, 1994); University of California, Los Angeles (PhD, 2001)

Academic work
- Discipline: Sociology
- Institutions: New York University Shanghai; New York University; Hong Kong University of Science and Technology
- Website: shanghai.nyu.edu/academics/faculty/directory/xiaogang-wu

Xiaogang Wu (Chinese: 吴晓刚) is a Chinese sociologist. He is the Yufeng Global Professor of Social Science at New York University Shanghai and a professor of sociology at New York University. He is also the founding director of the Center for Applied Social and Economic Research (CASER) at NYU Shanghai.

Wu is the founding editor of the Chinese Sociological Review. From 2018 to 2022, Wu served as the inaugural president of the International Chinese Sociological Association. He was also elected to the Sociological Research Association in 2022.

Further, Wu has organized summer programs on social science research methods with Shanghai University since 2012. In 2026, Shanghai University reported that the preceding fourteen summer camps had provided training for more than 5,200 young scholars and students from over 300 universities.

== Education and academic career ==
Wu earned a bachelor's degree in sociology from Renmin University of China in 1991, a master's degree in sociology from Peking University in 1994, and a PhD in sociology from the University of California, Los Angeles in 2001. From 2001 to 2003, he was an Andrew W. Mellon Postdoctoral Fellow at the University of Michigan's Population Studies Center and a lecturer in its Department of Sociology.

Wu joined the Hong Kong University of Science and Technology in 2003 as an assistant professor and became a full professor in 2011. He later became a chair professor in social science and public policy at HKUST. In 2020, he joined NYU Shanghai as Yufeng Global Professor and founding director of the Center for Applied Social and Economic Research, with a concurrent appointment in New York University's Department of Sociology. He was also a PIIRS Global Scholar at Princeton from 2020 to 2023.

== Research ==
Wu's research covers several areas of Chinese sociology, with much of his work examining inequality and social stratification. With Donald Treiman, he analyzed the relationship between the hukou system and intergenerational occupational mobility.

In research with Yu Xie, Wu found that higher returns to education in the market sector were concentrated among recent market entrants and reflected selective movement between sectors rather than marketization alone. Their article was subsequently the subject of a comment by Ben Jann and a reply by Xie and Wu, both published in the American Sociological Review in 2005.

Wu has also studied inequality in university admissions. A 2018 report in Legal Weekly discussed his research on China's autonomous university-admissions system, including findings that students from more advantaged families and regions with greater educational resources were more likely to benefit from this admissions route.
