= Xu Zhangrun =

Chinese jurist

- 许章润
- Born: October 1962 (age 64); Hefei, Anhui, China
- Education: Southwest University of Political Science and Law; China University of Political Science and Law; University of Melbourne
- Occupations: Law professor, jurist
- Known for: Criticism of Xi Jinping

Xu Zhangrun (Chinese: 许章润; pinyin: Xǔ Zhāngrùn; born October 1962) is a Chinese jurist. He was a professor of Jurisprudence and Constitutional Law at Tsinghua University in Beijing, and a research fellow with the Unirule Institute of Economics. His dissident writing having previously caused retributions by the authorities, in July 2020 he was detained for a week and subsequently barred from leaving Beijing. Observers believed this to be the result of an essay in which Xu sharply criticized the management of the COVID-19 pandemic in China.

== Education ==
Xu received his bachelor's degree from the Southwest University of Political Science and Law, a master's from the China University of Political Science and Law, and in 2000 a PhD from the University of Melbourne.

== Research ==
Xu's research specializes in jurisprudence, Western legal philosophy, constitutional theory, and the relationship between Confucianism and law. He is the author of a book on the Australian legal system.

=== Writing ===
In July 2018, Xu published an essay, translated as "Imminent Fears, Immediate Hopes", where he rebukes the recent policy shifts of general secretary of the Chinese Communist Party Xi Jinping, including the abolition of term limits and the restoration of a cult of personality, which is notable for being a rare expression of public dissent. Among other commentary, Xu wrote:

Over-investment in international aid could possibly result in deprivation at home ... where a large proportion of [the] population still lives in a pre-modern economy. The nation's wealth - including China's $3 trillion in surplus reserves - has been accumulated over the past four decades. The era of fast growth will surely come to an end. [Now] the official media call on the nation to endure hardships in the spirit of unity. "Fuck you!" you hear the people say.

The essay has been translated into English by Geremie Barmé and received some commentary from Western scholars. Xu had been suspended and put under investigation. The article proposed to restore the Chinese Chairman's tenure system, namely, from the life tenure system instituted under Xi's rule on 11 March 2018 to the fixed-term system that perdured between 1982 and 2018. The article prompted discussion among Chinese people about the changes. Some supported it, while some were worried about the safety of Xu. The article was published at a time of tension in China, which included the China–United States trade war as well as reports of inner-conflicts among senior Chinese Communist Party officials. The article emphasized that the public, including bureaucratic officials, were concerned about personal safety issues as well as the direction of national development. Xu claimed that these fears were due to the breaking of four basic principles by the ruling class, namely, public security, respect of private property, tolerance of the population's life freedoms, and the term limit in political governance.

Xu states that Chinese intellectuals should study the experience of the 2016 United States presidential election to understand how U.S. democracy works, its benefits and drawbacks, and its impacts on China. Xu contends that the American model of democracy should not be transplanted to China, citing the personal attacks and partisans politics in it. In Xu's view, the ideal system for China would be a hybrid of Western democracy with Confucian meritocracy, with the latter moderating the excesses of the former.

== Detention ==
In April 2019, friends reported that the authorities had prohibited Xu from leaving the country. He was stopped from boarding a flight to Japan on a trip authorized and funded by Tsinghua University. He was defended by other intellectuals, such as Zi Zhongyun, whose 2019 essay, "Mourning Tsinghua", attacked the action of Tsinghua authorities as the "latest round of 'book burning and burying scholars'".

In February 2020, Xu published an essay, "Viral Alarm: When Fury Overcomes Fear", condemning the Chinese government's response to the COVID-19 pandemic. Xu describes how the government banned the reporting of factual information during the outbreak and connects this problem to a larger freedom of speech issue in China. After the publication of this essay, Xu disappeared and his friends were unable to get in touch with him for a time. His account on WeChat was suspended and his name was scrubbed from Weibo. According to his friends, the requirement of authorities for him to quarantine in Beijing after returning from a Chinese New Year holiday in Anhui, his home province, was a pretext for his de facto house arrest.

On 6 July 2020, Xu was detained by Chinese police at his home in Beijing, being accused of speaking critically about China's response to the COVID-19 pandemic. He was released from custody on 12 July 2020. Subsequently, Xu was fired from his job at Tsinghua University. Both the US State Department and High Representative of the Union for Foreign Affairs and Security Policy Josep Borrell, who mentioned Xu in connection with the 709 crackdown, said that the EU:

also expects the Chinese authorities to immediately and unconditionally release, without any restrictions on their movement or work, all lawyers and legal activists imprisoned or persecuted by the authorities for their work before and since the '709 crackdown', such as Yu Wensheng, Li Yuhan and Ge Jueping.

Following his arrest, Xu was blacklisted by vendors, and after his release, he was put on an online blacklist which barred him from receiving donations from the public. In September 2020, artist and book vendor Geng Xiaonan was arrested together with her husband, ostensibly on charges of illegal business activities, but Xu said it had been because she had spoken out in his support. He put himself at the forefront of an effort by Chinese dissidents to publicize the difficulties of the couple.

In an essay published in December 2020, Xu wrote about his experience of being permanently monitored by security cameras in his compound in Beijing; while remaining free, he was not allowed to leave the city.

== See also ==
- Democracy in China
- Democracy movements in China
