= Frontiers of Physics =

- Discipline: Physics
- Language: English
- Edited by: Kuang-Ta Chao

Publication details
- Former name(s): Frontiers of Physics in China
- History: 2006–present
- Publisher: Higher Education Press & Springer Science+Business Media (China & Germany)
- Frequency: Bimonthly
- Impact factor: 6.5 (2023)

Standard abbreviations
- ISO 4: Front. Phys.
- NLM: Front Phys (Beijing)

Indexing
- ISSN: 2095-0462 (print); 2095-0470 (web)

Links
- Journal homepage; Higher Education Press

Frontiers of Physics (formerly Frontiers of Physics in China from 2006 to 2010) is a bimonthly peer-reviewed academic journal established in 2006 and co-published by Higher Education Press (China) and Springer Verlag (Germany) until 2024. Topics covered include quantum mechanics and quantum information; gravitation, cosmology and astrophysics; elementary particles and fields; nuclear physics; atomic physics, molecular physics, optical physics; statistical physics and nonlinear physics; plasma physics and accelerator physics; condensed matter physics; nanostructures and functional materials; and soft matter, biological physics and interdisciplinary physics.
