= Frontiers of Law in China =

- Discipline: Law
- Language: English
- Edited by: Lilian F. Jiang

Publication details
- History: 2006–present
- Publisher: Springer Science+Business Media on behalf of the Higher Education Press
- Frequency: Quarterly

Standard abbreviations
- ISO 4: Front. Law China

Indexing
- ISSN: 1673-3428 (print); 1673-3541 (web)
- LCCN: 2008234122
- OCLC no.: 746953930

Links
- Journal homepage; Online archive

Frontiers of Law in China is a quarterly peer-reviewed academic journal established in 2006 and co-published by Springer Science+Business Media and Higher Education Press, a publisher owned by China's Ministry of Education. Topics covered include jurisprudence, civil and commercial law, economic law, environmental law, intellectual property, criminal justice, procedural law, administrative law, international law, and legal history.

== Abstracting and indexing ==
The journal is abstracted and indexed in Academic OneFile and Scopus.
