= Frontiers in Physics =

- Discipline: Physics
- Language: English
- Edited by: Alex Hansen

Publication details
- History: 2013–present
- Publisher: Frontiers Media
- Frequency: Continuous
- Impact factor: 3.1 (2022)

Standard abbreviations
- ISO 4: Front. Phys. (Lausanne)
- NLM: Front Phys

Indexing
- ISSN: 2296-424X
- OCLC no.: 854736195

Links
- Journal homepage

Frontiers in Physics is a peer-reviewed open-access scientific journal covering physics. It was established in 2013 and is published by Frontiers Media. The editor-in-chief is Alex Hansen (Norwegian University of Science and Technology). The scope of the journal covers the entire field of physics, from experimental, to computational and theoretical physics.

== Abstracting and indexing ==
The journal is abstracted and indexed in Current Contents/Physical, Chemical & Earth Sciences, Science Citation Index Expanded, and Scopus. According to the Journal Citation Reports, the journal has a 2020 impact factor of 3.560. Frontiers Media was included in Jeffrey Beall's list of predatory publishers in 2016, though Beall deleted the entire Beall's List after Frontiers and others requested his employer open a misconduct case against him. Among other practices, Frontiers sends out large numbers of unsolicited emails to scientists based on minimal criteria (submission of an abstract to a conference, for example) and then asks them to submit a journal article or even serve as an editor for the journal.
