= Chinese Sociological Review =

- Discipline: Sociology
- Language: English
- Edited by: Xiaogang Wu

Publication details
- Former names: Chinese Sociology & Anthropology
- History: 1968–present
- Publisher: Routledge
- Frequency: 5/year
- Open access: Hybrid
- Impact factor: 3.667 (2021)

Standard abbreviations
- ISO 4: Chin. Sociol. Rev.

Indexing
- ISSN: 2162-0555 (print); 2162-0563 (web)
- OCLC no.: 999818697
- Chinese Sociology & Anthropology
- ISSN: 0009-4625

Links
- Journal homepage; Online access; Online archive; Journal page at New York University Shanghai

The Chinese Sociological Review is a quarterly peer-reviewed academic journal of sociology, with a specific focus on Chinese societies (the mainland, Hong Kong, Taiwan, and abroad). The journal was established in 1968 as Chinese Sociology & Anthropology, obtaining its current name in 2011 (《中华社会学评论》in Chinese). It is published by Routledge and since 2011 the editor-in-chief is Xiaogang Wu (New York University Shanghai and New York University). The journal is affiliated with the Center for Applied Social and Economic Research at New York University Shanghai.

A 2025 comparative study described the Chinese Sociological Review as a leading generalist Chinese sociology journal and found that its published research remained predominantly focused on Chinese societies. According to the Journal Citation Reports, the journal has a 2021 impact factor of 3.667, ranking it 29th out of 148 journals in the category "Sociology".
