= Frontier market =

Term for developing country's market economy

A frontier market is a term for a type of developing country's market economy which is more developed than a least developed country's, but too small, risky, or illiquid to be generally classified as an emerging market economy. The term is an economic term which was coined by International Finance Corporation's Farida Khambata in 1992. The term is commonly used to describe the equity markets of the smaller and less accessible, but still "investable" countries of the developing world. The frontier, or pre-emerging equity markets are typically pursued by investors seeking high, long-run return potential as well as low correlations with other markets. Some frontier market countries were emerging markets in the past, but have regressed to frontier status.

== Terminology ==
The term began use when the IFC Emerging Markets Database (EMDB), led by Farida Khambata, began publishing data on smaller markets in 1992. Khambata coined the term "Frontier Markets" for this set of indices. Standard and Poor's bought EMDB from IFC in 1999 and in October 2007, S&P launched the first investable index, the Select Frontier Index (30 of the largest companies from 11 countries) and the Extended Frontier Index (150 companies from 27 countries). Subsequently, MSCI began a rival frontier market index, and in early 2008, Deutsche Bank launched the first frontier market exchange-traded fund, on the London Stock Exchange. Frontier markets are a sub-set of emerging markets, which have market capitalizations that are small and/or low annual turnover and/or market restrictions unsuitable for inclusion in the larger EM indexes but nonetheless "demonstrate a relative openness to and accessibility for foreign investors" and are not under "extreme economic and political instability."

Members could be considered to fall roughly into three groups:

- Small countries of relatively high development level (such as Estonia) that are too small to be considered emerging markets,
- Countries with investment restrictions that have begun to loosen as of the mid 2000s (such as the countries of the Gulf Cooperation Council)
- Countries at a lower development level than the existing "mainstream" emerging markets (such as Kenya or Vietnam).

The term pre-emerging markets is sometimes used as a synonym for "frontier markets", emphasizing the expectation that they will eventually "graduate" to "emerging market" status.

A 2021 analysis proposes the term emerged to describe markets, economies, or countries that have graduated from emerging market status, but have not yet reached the level equivalent to developed countries.

== Investment case ==
Frontier markets have lower market capitalization and liquidity than the more developed, "traditional" emerging markets. The frontier equity markets are typically pursued by investors seeking high, long term returns and low correlations with other markets.

The implication of a country being labeled as Frontier is that, over time, the market will become more liquid and exhibit similar risk and return characteristics as the larger, more liquid emerging markets.

According to frontier market investors, frontier assets would actually diversify and reduce risk, which contradicts the general notion that risk would be added by including those markets.

Those who have a focus on frontier markets have different views on what the future holds for the inter-correlation of countries within the asset class. While they share some economic characteristics such as young, increasingly educated populations, the individual economies face different internal and external forces. Funds invest to find returns in countries that have increasing trends in domestic consumption but see the overall growth drivers for each country as being different. This investment thesis holds water as it is unlikely that a manufacturing based economy, such as Bangladesh, would respond in the same way to external shocks as an island nation where a large proportion of the economy is linked to tourism, such as Sri Lanka.

There are also other non managed ways to gain exposure to these markets that are more generic such as investing in frontier market indices such as MSCI Frontier Index that only invest in large liquid stocks.

== Frontier markets list ==
A number of organisations place countries into their Frontier market indices.

Country	FTSE	MSCI	S&P	Russell
Argentina	Frontier	Frontier	Frontier	Frontier
Bahrain	Frontier	Frontier	Frontier	Frontier
Bangladesh	Frontier	Frontier	Frontier	Frontier
Benin	not rated	Frontier (Note: Included in MSCI frontier markets category as part of the West African Economic and Monetary Union)	not rated	not rated
Bosnia and Herzegovina	not rated	Frontier	not rated	Frontier
Botswana	Frontier	Frontier	Frontier	Frontier
Bulgaria	Frontier	Frontier	Frontier	Frontier
Burkina Faso	not rated	Frontier	not rated	not rated
Côte d'Ivoire	Frontier	Frontier	Frontier	Frontier
Croatia	Frontier	Frontier	Frontier	Frontier
Cyprus	Frontier	not rated	Frontier	Frontier
Ecuador	not rated	not rated	Frontier	not rated
Estonia	Frontier	Frontier	Frontier	Frontier
Egypt	Secondary emerging	Emerging	Emerging	Frontier
Gabon	not rated	not rated	not rated	Frontier
Ghana	Frontier	Frontier	Frontier	Frontier
Guinea-Bissau	not rated	Frontier	not rated	not rated
Jamaica	not rated	Frontier	Frontier	Frontier
Jordan	Frontier	Frontier	Frontier	Frontier
Kazakhstan	Frontier	Frontier	Frontier	Frontier
Kenya	Frontier	Frontier	Frontier	Frontier
Kuwait	Secondary emerging	Frontier	Frontier	Frontier
Latvia	Frontier	not rated	Frontier	Emerging
Lebanon	not rated	Frontier	Frontier	not rated
Lithuania	Frontier	Frontier	Frontier	Frontier
Mali	not rated	Frontier	not rated	not rated
Malta	Frontier	not rated	not rated	Frontier
Mauritius	Frontier	Frontier	Frontier	Frontier
Morocco	Frontier	Frontier	Frontier	Emerging
Namibia	not rated	not rated	Frontier	Frontier
Niger	not rated	Frontier	not rated	not rated
Nigeria	Frontier	Frontier	Frontier	Frontier
North Macedonia	Frontier	not rated	not rated	not rated
Oman	Frontier	Frontier	Frontier	Frontier
Pakistan	Secondary emerging	Frontier	Frontier	Frontier
Panama	not rated	Frontier	Frontier	not rated
Papua New Guinea	not rated	not rated	not rated	Frontier
Qatar	Secondary emerging	Emerging	Emerging	Frontier
Romania	Secondary emerging	Frontier	Frontier	Frontier
Senegal	not rated	Frontier	not rated	Frontier
Serbia	Frontier	Frontier	not rated	Frontier
Slovakia	Frontier	not rated	Frontier	Frontier
Slovenia	Frontier	Frontier	Frontier	Frontier
Sri Lanka	Frontier	Frontier	Frontier	Frontier
Tanzania	not rated	not rated	not rated	Frontier
Togo	not rated	Frontier	not rated	not rated
Trinidad and Tobago	not rated	Frontier	Frontier	Frontier
Tunisia	Frontier	Frontier	Frontier	Frontier
Ukraine	not rated	Frontier	not rated	Frontier
Vietnam	Frontier	Frontier	Frontier	Emerging
Zambia	not rated	not rated	Frontier	Frontier

=== Past changes ===
Colombia was promoted to Emerging market by Standard & Poors effective September 19, 2011. Vietnam is set to be promoted to Emerging market by FTSE Russell on September 21, 2026. There have been a number of other changes and updates over the years.

== See also ==
- Developed market
- Stock exchanges of small economies
