= A Guide to the Core Journals of China =

A Guide to the Core Journals of China (Chinese: 中国核心期刊要目总览; pinyin: Zhōngguó Héxīn Qīkān Yàomù Zǒnglǎn) is an academic bibliographic reference work that lists and evaluates leading academic journals published in the People's Republic of China. It is one of the most influential journal evaluation systems in mainland China, widely used in higher education, research institutions, and library cataloging.

== Overview ==
The guide is compiled and published by Peking University Library, and is commonly referred to as the PKU Core (北大核心). It provides a comprehensive classification and selection of journals across multiple academic disciplines, identifying those considered to have high academic quality, influence, and citation impact within China. The publication serves as a key reference for evaluating academic output, journal submission quality, and institutional performance reviews in Chinese academia.

== History ==
The first edition of A Guide to the Core Journals of China was issued in 1992, following efforts by Peking University Library to standardize the assessment of Chinese academic periodicals. Subsequent editions have been released approximately every four years, reflecting updates in journal evaluation criteria, disciplinary developments, and citation data. The guide is now in its tenth edition, and continues to serve as a benchmark for academic journal classification in China.

== See also ==
- CSSCI
- AMI Comprehensive Evaluation Report
