= Chinese Science Citation Database =

Bibliographic database

- Producer: National Science Library (China)
- History: 1989; 37 years ago
- Languages: Simplified Chinese

Links
- Website: sciencechina.cn
- Title list(s): wokinfo.com/products_tools/multidisciplinary/cscd/

The Chinese Science Citation Database (CSCD) is a bibliographic database and citation index managed by Clarivate in partnership with the Chinese Academy of Sciences.

Created in 1989, it is the first non-English database available within the Web of Science. The CSCD contains journals in the topics of natural science, engineering technology, medicine, and additional technology and science areas. The database has almost 17 million citations and indexes 300,000 articles published between 1998 and the current time from thousands of journals. Its network version was created in 2002 and allows users to inquiries through two methods: "source literature and citation search".

It stores 1,200 China-based academic publications which in aggregate have 2 million entries. According to Jingfeng Xia, CSCD is "the earliest database in China" and "is widely recognized as one of the best databases for Chinese scientific literature". In a 2005 article in the Journal of the Association for Information Science and Technology, Loet Leydesdorff and Jin Bihui found that CSCD is "integrated by a maze of university-based journals". They continued, "In summary, one could say that the Chinese Science Citation Database exhibits the characteristics of transdisciplinary integration in the production of scientific knowledge more than its Western counterparts. In addition to intellectual organization a layer of institutional integration provides a focus on the priorities of the economy and the state that is absent in the international database."

== See also ==
- Chinese Social Sciences Citation Index
