= Foreign Language Teaching and Research =

Foreign Language Teaching and Research (simplified Chinese: 外语教学与研究; traditional Chinese: 外語教學與研究; pinyin: Wàiyǔ Jiàoxué yǔ Yánjiū) is the journal of Beijing Foreign Studies University. Founded in June 1957, it was the first academic journal in China's foreign language community, with Professors Wang Zuoliang and Xu Guozhang serving as editors-in-chief. Foreign Language Teaching and Research, published by the Foreign Language Teaching and Research Press, is a bimonthly journal with columns of languages and linguistics, foreign language education, translation studies, and intercultural studies etc. It is an authoritative journal in humanities and social sciences in China.

== History ==
In June 1957, "Western Languages" (西方語文) was founded in Beijing as the journal of Beijing Foreign Studies University, becoming the first academic journal in China's foreign language community. It was published once a quarter.

In the first issue of 1959, Western Languages became a bimonthly journal. Starting from the 4th issue of the same year, it was renamed "Foreign Language Teaching and Research".

In the first issue of 1962, Foreign Language Teaching and Research was changed back to a quarterly.

After the second issue in 1966, the journal was suspended for 12 years due to the Cultural Revolution.

In September 1978, Foreign Language Teaching and Research resumed publication.

In 2000, the publication period was changed back to bimonthly.

In November 2014, Foreign Language Teaching and Research was selected as one of the first batch of academic journals approved by the State Administration of Press, Publication, Radio, Film and Television.

== What's covered ==
Foreign Language Teaching and Research covers all major aspects of foreign language studies, with columns on language research, foreign language education, translation research, and book and periodical reviews.

== Honours and Indexes ==
According to a report by China National Knowledge Infrastructure on February 3, 2025, the performance of Foreign Language Teaching and Research are

Number of publications: 4751

Total downloads: 6633249 times

Total citations: 269,455

Evaluation information (2024 edition) Composite impact factor: 2.095

(2024 edition) Comprehensive impact factor: 1.351

Foreign Language Teaching and Research is an authoritative journal in the “AMI Comprehensive Evaluation of Chinese Humanities and Social Sciences Journals”, a source journal of Peking University’s “Overview of Chinese Core Journals”, and a source journal in the Chinese Social Sciences Citation Index (CSSCI). This journal has long been included in the American Linguistics and Language Behavior Abstracts and Sociological Abstracts.

Foreign Language Teaching and Research has also been selected into the 100 key journals, social science dual-effect journals, and China's outstanding academic journals with international influence.

== Editorial Department ==
Professor Wang Zuoliang and Professor Xu Guozhang, two well-known scholars in the field of foreign languages in China, both served as editors-in-chief of this journal.

Current Honorary Editor-in-Chief: Wang Kefei

Editor-in-Chief: Wang Wenbin
