= Guozhang (disambiguation) =

Feng Guozhang (Chinese: 冯国璋) was a Chinese general and politician.

Guozhang could also refer to:

- Jin Guozhang (Chinese: 金国章), Chinese pharmacologist
- Li Guozhang (Chinese: 李国章), Hong Kong doctor and politician
- Xu Guozhang (Chinese: 许国璋), Chinese linguist
