= Eurasian Humanities Studies =

Eurasian Humanities Studies 欧亚人文研究 Eвразийские гуманитарные исследования
- Discipline: Slavic studies
- Language: Chinese, Russian

Publication details
- Former name: Russian Language (1959–2019)
- History: 1959–present
- Publisher: Foreign Language Teaching and Research Press (China)
- Frequency: Quarterly

Standard abbreviations
- ISO 4: Eurasian Humanit. Stud.

Indexing
- ISSN: 2096-7756

Links
- Journal homepage

Eurasian Humanities Studies (Chinese: 欧亚人文研究; pinyin: Ōuyǎ Rénwén Yánjiū; Russian: Eвразийские гуманитарные исследования) is a peer-reviewed academic journal edited by the School of Russian Studies, Beijing Foreign Studies University and published by the Foreign Language Teaching and Research Press. The journal focuses on interdisciplinary research concerning the countries and regions along the Silk Road Economic Belt, including the Slavic states, the South Caucasus, Central Asia, West Asia, and South Asia.

== History ==
The journal traces its origins to Russian Language (Chinese: 俄语学习; Russian: Русский язык), a long-standing publication established in 1959 by Beijing Foreign Studies University. Initially published monthly, the magazine played a significant role in the spread and promotion of the Russian language in China. During the Cultural Revolution, Russian Language was temporarily suspended. Following the reform and opening-up policy, Russian Language resumed publication in 1985, switching from a monthly to a bimonthly format.

It was officially renamed as Eurasian Humanities Studies in October 2019, marking a transition from a language-teaching periodical to an academic journal. Eurasian Humanities Studies publishes research on a wide range of topics related to Eurasian societies and cultures, including literature and the arts, history and philosophy, religion and education, national and regional studies, language situations and media, cultural psychology and local intellectual traditions.

== Abstracting and indexing ==
The journal is published quarterly and distributed publicly in China and abroad. It is administered under the Ministry of Education of the People's Republic of China. The journal is abstracted and indexed in CNKI, AMI Comprehensive Evaluation Report, CQVIP, National Center for Philosophy and Social Sciences Documentation (Chinese Academy of Social Sciences).
