= CNKI Journal Translation Project =

Chinese academic translation project

Journal Translation Project (JTP) is sponsored by CNKI. It aims to select and translate the top Chinese Academic journals to assist the global scholars to easily understand and apply the Chinese research outcomes. All the selected journals have high academic research quality and a long publishing history.

JTP consist of the English translation edition of high-quality Chinese journals selected by their [impact factors] and total citation. Coverage is from 2015 onwards. JTP is selected to the Press and Publication Reform Development Project Library (2015) of State Administration of Press, Publication, Radio, Film and Television (SAPPRFT) of China.

The JTP database targets the global market with Chinese-English bilingual full-text as the basic publishing mode, accompanied by academic Press releases. Moreover, it comes with academic novelty database and knowledge database, so that the latest academic achievement of China can reach academic communities, educators and the public all over the world.

Currently, this project includes 66 journals of social sciences and humanities and 46 science/technology/medicine journals. This project planned to translate 200 journals with 10,000 articles in total during 2015–2017, and the total amount reach 400 journals with 20,000 articles from 2018 to 2020. Journals of general studies and with science popularization value will be given preference in the first stage of translation. The translation team consists of over 1200 experts in corresponding research fields with proficiency in both English and Chinese.

== Important content ==
Science and technology journals

- The important applied basic research in China;
- The leading basic research in China;
- The high technology research in China;
- The most advanced engineering research in China.

Social Sciences Journals

- Traditional Chinese culture research;
- Contemporary China studies;
- International studies made by Chinese scholars.

== High quality ==
Disciplines:

- With Chinese distinguished characteristics;
- Attractive to the global scholars;
- Where China plays a leading role.

Journals:

- With high international interests;
- With substantial academic supports;
- With high prestige in research communities.

Papers:

- Selected by peer-reviewers and translated by specialists from the world.

== Special added-value ==
Easy view:

- English–Chinese bilingual full-text with multiple reading choices.

Novelty:

- Each novelty given before the full-text indicates the paper's innovative value.

Knowledge:

- An explanation of important concepts in the content is given bilingually.

Hot Topics:

- Communicating important, newest issues and discoveries.
