= Muhammad Najati Sidqi =

Palestinian public intellectual and activist

- محمد نجاتي صدقي
- Born: 15 May 1905; Jerusalem, Ottoman Empire
- Died: 17 November 1979 (aged 74); Athens, Greece
- Education: KUTV
- Occupation: Writer
- Organization: Palestine Communist Party

Muhammad Najati Sidqi (Arabic: محمد نجاتي صدقي, Muḥammad Najātī Ṣidqī, 19 May 1905 – 17 November 1979) was a Palestinian public intellectual and activist, trade unionist, translator, writer, critic and erstwhile communist. Though almost forgotten as a figure in the Palestinian movement for independence, he played an important role in it, and witnessed many momentous moments in the early history of the 20th century. Aside from his native Arabic, he was fluent in French, Russian and Spanish.

He was present with his father when Sherif Hussein launched the Arab Revolt against the Ottoman Empire in 1916; the beginning of Zionist immigration to Palestine; the early years of the establishment of communism in the Soviet Union, and was one of the few Arabs who fought on the Republican side against Franco in the Spanish Civil War. At the outbreak of World War II, he wrote a book in which the thesis of the incompatibility of Nazism with Islam was passionately argued. (Note: "The author, Muhammad Najati Sidqi, enjoys a deservedly wide celebrity as author and thinker. In a note the author speaks of his own 'Kampf' against Hitlerism ever since the Nazis came into power... the thesis of Islam's fundamental incompatibility with Nazism is passionately argued." (Islam's Answer to Hitler 1940, p. 455))

== Biography ==
Sidqi was born into a middle-class Palestinian family in Jerusalem in May 1905. His father Bakri Sidqi was a teacher of Turkish ancestry and "aficionado of art and classical music," the first person to bring a phonograph to Palestine. His mother, Nazira Murad, came from a prominent Jerusalem mercantile family, also loved the arts, and was a "well-known socialite." After an early education at the al-Salhiyya Elementary School, followed by al-Ma'muniyya school and al-Rashidiyya, he joined his father in 1914 as the latter worked in other parts of the Ottoman Empire, and in his formative years he grew up in Damascus, Cairo and Jeddah in the Hejaz, where Bakri had joined Prince Faisal's campaign.

On returning to Palestine he became an employee of the Mandatory Palestine's Department of Posts and Telegraphs. There he met Jewish workers who introduced him to Communism. He spent three years, from 1925 to 1928, at the Comintern's Communist University of the Toilers of the East (KUTV, pronounced Kutvo), and during his time there married a Ukrainian communist. He developed contacts with Joseph Stalin, Nikolai Bukharin, Georges Marchais and Khalid Bakdash, the Kurdish leader of the Syrian Communist Party, met Mao Zedong and got acquainted with the Turkish poet Nâzım Hikmet and members of the family of Jawaharlal Nehru. He returned with his wife to Palestine in 1928, and they began to organise activities against the British Mandatory authorities.

On the occasion of the 1929 riots, the Jewish Communists were split between those who sympathised with victims of the massacres, and others who, like the Arab Communists, considered the moment to be one of an Arab revolt against the British Mandate, land seizure and the pauperisation of the peasantry. Based in Haifa, where he supervised the Party's local branch, Sidqi maintained regular contacts with Sheik Izz ad-Din al-Qassam, and defined the latter's death in 1935 as one of martyrdom. The Comintern had instructed the Palestine Communist Party to Arabise as early as 1924, without much success. One of the tasks the Party assigned to Sidqi was to undertake this Arabisation. The Palestine branch of the party was largely dominated by Jews with socialist tendencies and was suspected of having in its ranks militants with crypto-Zionist sympathies. In 1930, Sidqi was picked up by the Mandatory police in Jaffa and sentenced to 2 years imprisonment, which he served in Jerusalem, Jaffa and Akka. His elder brother Ahmad, who had also studied with him at KUTV, was the chief witness for the prosecution. In Sidqi's recollection, Ahmad is described as fragile and being coerced into forced confessions. Reports from the Mandatory authorities cast him as a police informer, who provided extensive details of Comintern contacts and training. Towards the end of 1932, on his release from prison, where he made the acquaintance of Abu Jilda, the 'Dillinger of the desert," the Party ordered him to contact Awni Abd al-Hadi in order to begin to coordinate with the Istiqlal Independence Party. As surveillance from the Mandatory administration intensified, the Communist Party smuggled him abroad in June 1933 to Paris where he assumed the editorship of the Comintern's Arabic-language journal, The Arab East. The French authorities subsequently arrested him and had him deported back to Palestine. He later dated his opposition to Nazism to this period – Hitler assumed power in 1933.

In 1935 he was sent to Tashkent to study directly the issue of nationality under communism. While in Uzbekistan he developed close relationships with the Uzbek communist leaders Akmal Ikramov and Fayzulla Khodzhayev. Both sided with Nikolai Bukharin's agrarian policies, which ran counter to the line set down by Stalin. They also familiarised him with the ideas of the Left Opposition to Stalinism associated with Grigory Zinoviev. His two Uzbek friends were killed shortly afterwards, victims of Stalin's Great Purge. Sidqi had first hand experience of Nazi Germany, having travelled through the country in 1936, and when, later, party loyalty dictated silence after the signing of the Molotov–Ribbentrop Pact, he refused to buckle under and conceal his disagreement.

Sidqi was one of at least four Palestinian Arabs, the other three being Mahmoud al-Atrash, Ali Abds al-Khaliq and Fawsi al-Nabulsi, who are known to have fought on the Republican side in the Spanish Civil War. This kind of involvement was harshly criticised by mainstream Palestinian newspapers (although not by local Communist pamphlets). Reflecting the general trend of the Palestinian national movement, newspapers like Filastin were averse to Communism and backed the Spanish Fascists, partly out of a desire to antagonise both Great Britain and France, the region's colonial powers. While in Spain, where he arrived in August 1936, Sidqi undertook, on Comintern instructions, to travel under a Moroccan alias, as Mustafa Ibn Jala, and conduct propaganda aimed at dissuading Moroccans in Franco's forces from fighting on the fascist side. He argued that the fascist ideology was contrary to Islam. In Barcelona, he introduced himself in Spanish to the local government militia, according to his memoirs, in the following terms:

I am an Arab volunteer. I have come to defend liberty in Madrid, to defend Damascus in Guadalajara, Jerusalem in Córdoba, Baghdad in Toledo, Cairo in Zaragoza, and Tatwan in Burgos.

Under the pseudonym of 'Mustafa Ibn Jala' he wrote for the Communist newspaper Mundo Obrero, urging Moroccans to desert the fascist army. Most of his activity however consisted of making radio broadcasts, writing pamphlets in Arabic, and haranguing Moroccan troops in their trenches by means of a megaphone. His proposal that an anti-colonial revolution be stirred up in the Moroccan Rif in order to deprive the fascists of cannon fodder met with resolute opposition from Dolores Ibárruri, La Pasionaria of the Spanish Communist Party, who is said to have opposed any alliance with what she called "hordes of Moors, beastly savages (morisma salvaje) drunk with sensuality who rape our women and daughters." Frustrated by the few Moroccans who were convinced, and experiencing the party's hostility to them, he left Spain in December 1936.

Sidqi then moved to Algeria where he tried, unsuccessfully, to set up a clandestine radio station to broadcast appeals for the natives of the Rif mountains to desert. Ibárruri's opposition to his work led to him being banned from returning to Republican Spain. Thereafter the Party had him return to Lebanon where he resumed his journalistic activities.

In 1940, shortly after the outbreak of World War II, he published a book-length study which argued for the incompatibility of Nazism and Islamic tradition. The work, entitled The Islamic Traditions and the Nazi Principles: Can They Agree? was simultaneously published in Beirut and Cairo. Together with the strain in his personal relations with the leader of the Syrian Communist Party, Khalid Bakdash, the publication led to his expulsion from the Communist Party, which regarded the work's dependence on many Islamic texts as contrary to the secularist principles of Marxism. In the postwar period he enjoyed a successful career as a literary critic and broadcaster in both Lebanon and Cyprus. He had a son, and one of his daughters became a prominent doctor in the Soviet Union. A literary prize in his honour, the Najati Sidqi Competition, has been held in Ramallah. Sidqi died in exile in Athens in 1979.

== Literary activities ==
His book "An Arab Who Fought in Spain" was published under the name of Khalid Bakdash, his Kurdish adversary within the Communist Party, a fact which only increased his enmity towards both Bakdash and the Party.

His translations included works ranging from major American and Chinese novelists to Russian classics: he introduced Alexander Pushkin, (Note: Actually, Sidqi's fellow Palestinian Khalil Ibrahim Baydas (1874–1949), born in Nazareth and of Greek Orthodox origins, is thought to be the first translator of Russian fiction into Arabic and had translated Pushkin into that language as early as 1898, when his version of The Captain's Daughter was published in Beirut (Moosa 1997, p. 101).) Anton Chekhov and Maxim Gorky to the Arabic world. He published two collections of short stories, many of them depicting the lives and inner feelings of the lower classes. The first, The Sad Sisters (al-Akhwat al-Hazinat, Cairo 1953), looks at the problems Palestinians encountered in adjusting from traditional, romantically remembered Arab Jaffa to the rising metropolis of Tel Aviv and the strange habits of foreigners, the new Jewish society. The title story (1947) is a narrative of a Palestinian man, sitting down at the base of one of five sycamore trees, the ragged residue of what was once an Arab orchard, and imagining them as five sisters who in mourning clothes recall the rapid changes as the orchard was taken over by the modern urban sprawl. As an autumnal storm sweeps the area, the trees stand firm like "towering mountains". The second, The Communist Millionaire (Beirut 1963) consisted of many satirical vignettes of Arab Communists of his acquaintance. His memoirs (Mudhakkirat Najati Sidqi: The memoirs of Najati Sidqi), edited by Hanna Abu Hanna, were published in Beirut in 2001.

Sidqi was, in addition to Arabic, "well versed in both written and spoken English, French, and Russian, and he was proficient in Turkish and Spanish." He sometimes wrote under the pseudonym "Mustafa Sa'du" or "Sa'du" as well as "Mustafa al-'Umari."

== Analysis of the incompatibility of Islam with Nazism ==
From his Soviet years, Sidqi was primarily interested in the problem of how one might bring about the transformation of Muslim societies into modern industrialised countries without damaging their traditional social fabric. In his 1940 work "The Islamic Traditions and the Nazi Principles: Can They Agree/Do They Match?" (al-Taqālid al-islāmiyya wa-l-mabādiʾ al-nāziyya: hal tattafiqān?), published in early May of that year, Sidqi argued that Nazism was not only diametrically opposed to Islam, and that there could be no accommodation of the Islamic world to the kind of world advocated by Nazi Germany, but that indeed Nazism was antagonistic to Islam. The interaction of the two could only end in a zero-sum game. He thus declares that:

There is no doubt that the spirit of Islam is totally antithetical, in each and every aspect, to all the principles of Nazism: the political regime, society, family, economic, education and personal freedom.

Though Sidqi took a distinctive approach – he was not a typical Islamic thinker – his book's argument was not unique but reflected a widespread trend in Arab rejections of Nazism. His polemic was based on a thorough familiarity with Hitler's Mein Kampf, the writings of Alfred Rosenberg, and broadcasts of Nazi propaganda by Joseph Goebbels. He compares the ideological material in these sources with Islamic classical texts ranging from the Qur'an and the Hadith collections to modern writings, including works by Muhammad Abduh, Jamal ad-Din al-Afghani and Mustafa Kamil. The fundamental element that renders Nazism not only incompatible with, but inimical to, Islam, Sidqi argued, lies in the former's concept of racism (al-'unṣuriyya/al-'irqiyya).

Nazism was wedded to the idea of German racial purity and dedicated to weeding out or destroying "inferior" races, among which the Jews, and then the Russians, Negroes, Arabs, Egyptians, and Turks were classified. Nazi imperialism demanded a Lebensraum/masāḥa ḥayyawiyya, and sought to conquer territory for Greater Germany. Islam, to the contrary, was devoid of racist feelings: Muslims enjoyed only one advantage over others, the worship of the Creator, which affirms that "all the believers are brothers". Glossing over an Islamic perception that Islam is a superior religion, something which both Judaism and Christianity have also claimed, he insists that Islam is tolerant. Islam, like the sister monotheisms, is universal, and revolutionary. "Judaism was a revolution against the Pharaohs, Christianity was a revolution against Roman injustice and Islam was a revolution to abolish ignorance:jāhiliyya. Only faith, not blood, soil or race, informs Islam's notion of man's essential identity."

Whereas Nazism is materialistic, bestial and pagan, and accentuates the physical sensual nature of man, Islam embodies, for Sidqi, the ideational human side. The function of Nazism is therefore to extirpate what is spiritual in order to prioritise the supremacy of animalistic materialism. The one constitutes a real revolution (thawra), Nazism sows disobedience (iṣyān) and plunges man back into the degraded pagan state of bestial idolatrous ignorance, which would effectively lead to "social barbarism" (al-hamijiyya al-'ijtimā'iyya). The attack on Judaism in Nazism, he warned, was by the same token, an assault on both Christianity and Islam. Islam's institution of consultation (al-shūrā) was what made it disposed to accept the idea of modern democracy, with its guarantee of freedom.

Sidqi distinguished two kinds of imperialism: the classical, somewhat aged form of colonialism practiced by the English, French and Dutch, and German imperialism (ak-isti'mār al-almānī). The former recognized that the nations they occupied were destined to achieve independence, whereas Nazi imperialism was using unprecedented violence to annihilate smaller nations. A Nazi takeover of Islamic countries would lead only to the people's enslavement ('ubūdiyya), as it had in Austria, Czechoslovakia and Poland. Force, which in Islam was directed against the ignorant who refused the enlightenment of monotheism, had, in Nazism, assumed a cultic value, as an end in itself, directed towards the subjection of people both within territories Germany controlled and beyond. Nazism's Arabic broadcasts with their anti-Semitic propaganda were designed to incite Arabs to turn upon their own minorities. Muslims all over the world must, he concluded, back the fight against Nazism, as indeed hundreds of thousands already were (Indians and Arabs) in combating "shoulder to shoulder with English, French, Polish and Czech soldiers". Such support was anchored in three principles: a shared respect for democracy, a cultural affinity with democratic nations, and the aspiration for independence at war's end.

Nazism also was endeavouring to create a new religion (diyāna), presenting Hitler as a sacred figure, a prophet, to whom blind obedience was owed, and the soul of the believer in this false religion thereby dwarfed. It preached a satanic message (risāla shaytāniyya) and, under the Führer's leadership, Nazism was laying siege to "the fortress of science and civilization".

In an appendix he made a detailed critique of the memorandum delivered by Egypt's Wafd Party to the British Ambassador Miles Lampson in April 1940 which outlined stringent conditions to be attached to any Egyptian contribution to the British war effort. The memorandum had been promptly rejected by Viscount Halifax. Sidqi criticized Mustafa el-Nahhas for an inept reading of the growing threat from Hitler and Mussolini's forces, and called on Egypt to assume its historic responsibilities by siding with "the two noble peoples of England and France". He conceded that while it was true that both Britain and France were colonial powers in the Arab world, with possessions and mandates respectively in Mandatory Palestine, Aden, Egypt, Sudan and Syria and Lebanon, the anti-colonial struggle had to await the outcome of the war, and Muslims had to mobilise to ensure that these two powers came out victors in the conflict. He argued for this notwithstanding the fact that he himself had, in his recollections, been persecuted by the French, and did not enjoy good relations with the British.

== See also ==
- Islamism
- Relations between Nazi Germany and the Arab world
- Islamophobia
- Jewish Bolshevism
- Islam in the Soviet Union

== Sources ==
- Alyan, Talal (6 April 2013). "Palestinians and the Syrian Revolution: Lessons from the fight against fascism". +972 Magazine.
- Bishop, Elizabeth (2006). "Economic Imperialism in the Palestine Mandate". In Douglas, R. M.; Callahan, Michael Dennis; Bishop, Elizabeth (eds.). Imperialism on Trial: International Oversight of Colonial Rule in Historical Perspective. Lexington Books. ISBN 978-0-7391-0489-7.
- Catherine, Lucas (2003). Palestine: la dernière colonie?. Editions Aden. ISBN 978-2-87262-200-9.
- Corral, Pedro (2006). Desertores: la Guerra Civil que nadie quiere contar. Random House/Mondadori. ISBN 978-84-8306-650-8.
- Gershoni, Israel (2012). "Why the Muslims Must Fight against Nazi Germany: Muḥammad Najātī Ṣidqī's plea". Die Welt des Islams. 52 (3/4): 471–498. doi:10.1163/15700607-20120A10.
- Hen-Tov, Jacob (1974). Communism and Zionism in Palestine: The Comintern and the Political Unrest in the 1920s. Transaction Publishers. ISBN 978-1-4128-1997-8.
- "Islam's Answer to Hitler". Great Britain and the East. 54. India: 455. 27 June 1940. OCLC 4865016.
- Kabha, Mustafa (2014). "The Spanish Civil War as reflected in Contemporary Palestinian Press". In Gershoni, Israel (ed.). Arab Responses to Fascism and Nazism: Attraction and Repulsion. University of Texas Press. pp. 127–139. ISBN 978-0-292-75747-9.
- LeVine, Mark (2005). Overthrowing Geography: Jaffa, Tel Aviv, and the Struggle for Palestine, 1880–1948. University of California Press. ISBN 978-0-520-93850-2.
- Mattar, Philip (2005). The Encyclopedia of the Palestinians. Facts on File, Inc. ISBN 978-0-8160-6986-6.
- Matthews, Weldon (2006). Confronting an Empire, Constructing a Nation: Arab Nationalists and Popular Politics in Mandate Palestine. I.B. Tauris. ISBN 978-1-84511-173-1.
- Moosa, Matti (1997). The Origins of Modern Arabic Fiction (2nd ed.). Lynne Rienner Publishers. ISBN 978-0-89410-684-2.
- Nassar, Issam (2008). "Jerusalem in the late Ottoman period: historical writing and the native voice". In Mayer, Tamar; Mourad, Suleiman A. (eds.). Jerusalem: Idea and Reality. Routledge. pp. 205–222. ISBN 978-1-134-10287-7.
- Nordbruch, Götz (2009). Nazism in Syria and Lebanon: The Ambivalence of the German Option, 1933–1945. Routledge. ISBN 978-1-134-10560-1.
- Parmenter, Barbara McKean (2010). Giving Voice to Stones: Place and Identity in Palestinian Literature. University of Texas Press. ISBN 978-0-292-78795-7.
- Saif, Atef Abu; et al. (2015). The Book of Gaza: A City in Short Fiction. Comma Press.
- Sidqi, Najati (2001). Abu Hanna, Hanna (ed.). Mudhakkirat Najati Sidqi (The memoirs of Najati Sidqi). Beirut: Mu'assasat al-Dirasat al-Filastiyya.
- Tamari, Salim (2001). "The Enigmatic Jerusalem Bolshevik: The Memoirs of Najati Siqi". Jerusalem Quarterly (14). Institute for Palestine Studies: 49–50. doi:10.70190/jq.I14.p49.
- Tamari, Salim (2008). "10: The Enigmatic Bolshevik from the Holy City". Mountain against the Sea: Essays on Palestinian Society. University of California Press. pp. 167–17. ISBN 978-0-520-94242-4.
- Tamari, Salim; Turjman, Ihsan Salih (2011). Year of the Locust: A Soldier's Diary and the Erasure of Palestine's Ottoman Past. University of California Press. ISBN 978-0-520-94878-5.
- Wildangel, René [in German] (2014). "More than the Mufti: Other Arab-Palestinian Voices on Nazi Germany, 1934–1945 and their Post-War Narrations". In Gershoni, Israel (ed.). Arab Responses to Fascism and Nazism: Attraction and Repulsion. University of Texas Press. pp. 101–126. ISBN 978-0-292-75746-2 – via Project MUSE.
- Winder, Alex (2015). "Abu Jilda, Anti-imperial anti-hero: banditry and popular rebellion in Palestine". In Schayegh, Cyrus; Arsan, Andrew (eds.). The Routledge Handbook of the History of the Middle East Mandates. Routledge History Handbooks. Routledge. pp. 308–319. ISBN 978-1-317-49706-6.
