= Yang Fenglan =

Chinese businesswoman (born 1949)

- 杨凤兰
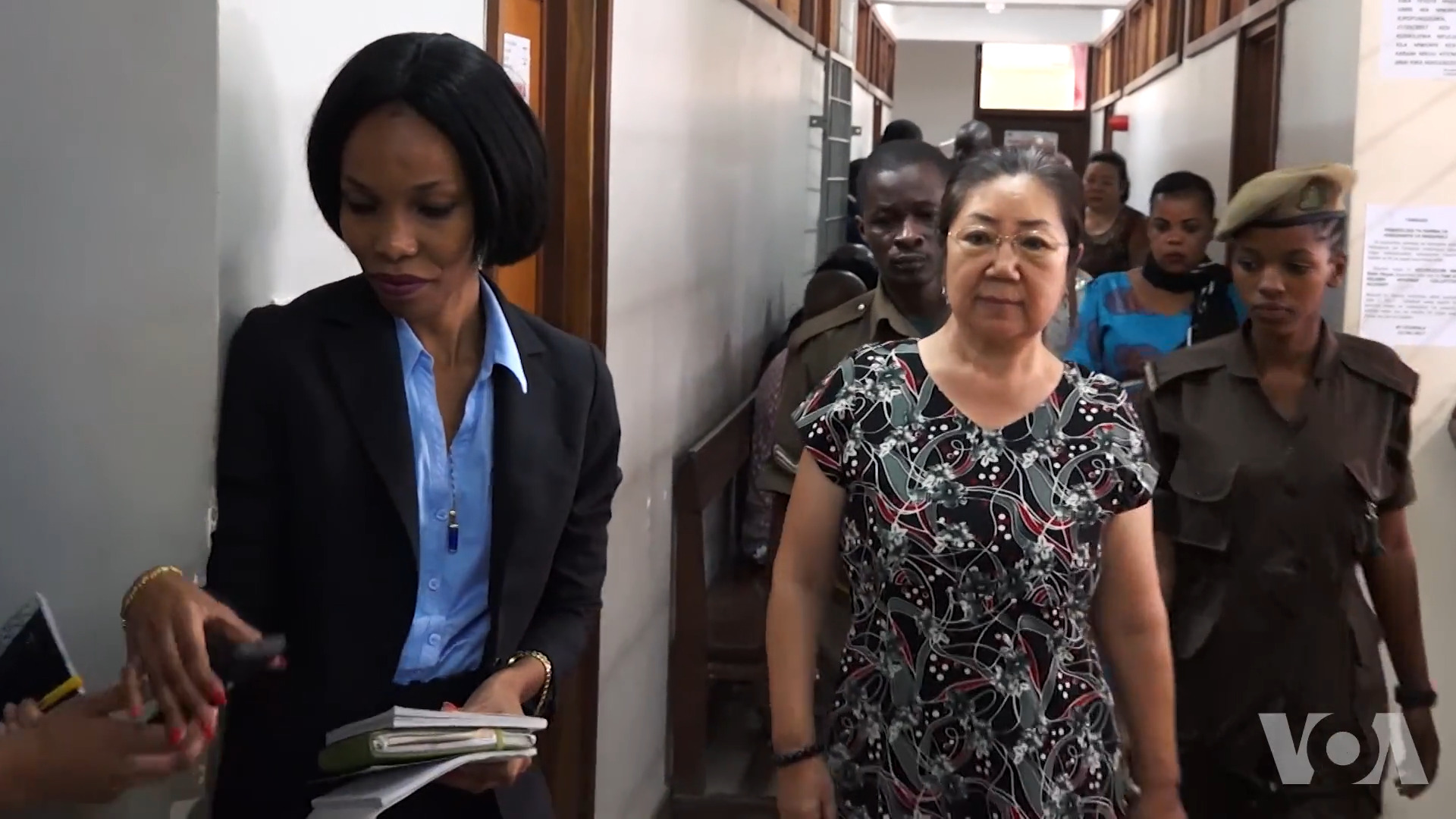
- Yang Fenglan
- Born: 1949 (age 76–77); Beijing, China
- Education: Beijing Foreign Studies University
- Occupations: Restaurateur, translator
- Known for: Smuggling ivory

Chinese name
- Traditional Chinese: 楊鳳蘭
- Simplified Chinese: 杨凤兰
Transcriptions
Standard Mandarin
- Hanyu Pinyin: Yáng Fènglán
- Wade–Giles: Yang Feng-lan

Yang Fenglan (Chinese: 杨凤兰; born 1949) is a Chinese businesswoman who has been convicted of smuggling ivory. She was formerly based in Tanzania and is nicknamed by the media as the "Ivory Queen".

== Biography ==
Yang was born in Beijing, China in 1949. She graduated from the Beijing Foreign Studies University, where she majored in Swahili. In 1975, she was assigned to Tanzania, where she worked as a translator in the construction of the TAZARA Railway, linking Zambia's landlocked copper belt with Tanzania's coast, at the time China's most significant African investment. After the project, she returned to China.

In 1998, she returned to Tanzania and set up two businesses in Dar es Salaam: Beijing Restaurant and Beijing Great Wall Investment. The restaurant has been successful. She also served as vice-chairwoman and secretary-general of the China-Africa Business Council of Tanzania.

Yang started smuggling ivory in 2006. Until her arrest in October 2015, she smuggled up to 1,900 kilograms (4,200 lb) of ivory, worth about 5.4 billion Tanzanian shillings (US$2.7 million), making her one of the largest ivory smugglers in Africa. Most of the elephant tusks were smuggled and sold to Asia.

Yang was arrested in October 2015. In February 2019, she and two Tanzanian men, Salivius Matembo and Manase Philemon, were each sentenced to 15 years' imprisonment for "leading an organised criminal gang" by the Tanzanian court. Her properties were ordered to be confiscated. She has appealed her sentence. In reaction to her conviction, the Chinese Foreign Ministry issued a public statement supporting the court decision and condemning illegal activities of Chinese nationals abroad.

== Personal life ==
Yang has a daughter named Fei (非), which is short for "Feizhou" (非洲), the Chinese word for Africa.
