= CGSH =

CGSH may refer to:

- Cheng Kung Senior High School in Taipei
- Cleary Gottlieb Steen & Hamilton, American law firm
