= Eurasian studies =

Academic field

Eurasian studies is an interdisciplinary field concerned with the history, politics, societies, cultures, and intellectual traditions of Eurasia. Depending on the institutional and scholarly context, the term may refer to the study of the former Soviet Union, Central Asia, and inner Asia, or to a broader transregional approach encompassing Europe and Asia.

The field draws on history, political science, anthropology, sociology, geography, and area studies. Its major themes include empire and imperialism, migration and mobility, trade and cultural exchange, nationalism studies, socialism and communism studies, religion, and transnational networks.

== History ==
The intellectual background of Eurasian studies includes earlier scholarship on the historical and cultural relationships between Europe and Asia, as well as the Eurasianist movement that emerged among Russian émigré intellectuals in the 1920s. Eurasianism, however, is distinct from the modern academic field of Eurasian studies.

During the Cold War, scholarship on Eurasia was largely divided among separate area-studies fields, including Soviet studies, Russian studies, East European studies, Central Asian studies, and Asian studies. Since the late twentieth century, the development of transnational, connected, and global history has encouraged scholars to examine interactions across these regional boundaries.

Contemporary Eurasian studies therefore often emphasizes connection and circulation rather than treating Europe and Asia as separate and self-contained regions. Scholars have used the Eurasian framework to study subjects ranging from the Silk Roads and imperial formations to socialism, migration, and post-socialism.

== Institutions ==
- Association for Slavic, East European, and Eurasian Studies
- Central Eurasian Studies Society
- Davis Center for Russian and Eurasian Studies, Harvard University
- Center for Russian, East European and Eurasian Studies, Stanford University
- Centre for European and Eurasian Studies, University of Toronto
- Center for East European, Russian, and Eurasian Studies, University of Chicago
- Center for Russian, East European, and Eurasian Studies, University of Pittsburg
- Center for European and Eurasian Studies, Michigan State University
- Institute of European, Russian and Eurasian Studies, Carleton University
- Institute for European, Russian and Eurasian Studies, George Washington University
- Department of European and Eurasian Studies, University of Texas at Austin
- Department of Central Eurasian Studies, Indiana University Bloomington
- Department of Slavic & Eurasian Studies, Duke University
- Program in Russian, East European and Eurasian Studies, Princeton University
- Russian and Eurasian Studies program, George Mason University
- Russian and Eurasian Studies Program, Colgate University

== Journals ==
- Eurasian Studies (Brill)
- Journal of Eurasian Studies (Sage)
- Eurasian Humanities Studies (FLTRP)
