= Wanfang Data =

Wanfang Data (Chinese: 万方数据) is a leading Chinese academic information and knowledge service provider. It maintains one of the three major academic databases in mainland China, alongside China National Knowledge Infrastructure (CNKI) and CQVIP. The platform provides access to a wide range of Chinese-language scholarly resources, including journals, dissertations, conference proceedings, patents, and standards.

== Overview ==
Wanfang Data was established in 1993 and is operated by Wanfang Data Co., Ltd., a company affiliated with the Chinese Ministry of Science and Technology (MOST). The database aims to promote the digitalization and international accessibility of Chinese academic output, serving universities, research institutes, libraries, and individual scholars. Its headquarters are located in Beijing, China, and its services are available both domestically and internationally through institutional subscriptions and online access.

== Coverage and access ==
As of the 2020s, Wanfang Data's digital platforms collectively host millions of academic documents, covering a broad range of disciplines. Key database components include:

- China Local Gazetteers
- China Online Journals
- Dissertations of China
- Academic Conferences in China

Wanfang Data operates on a subscription-based model, providing full-text and bibliographic access via institutional and individual licenses. Users can search and download materials through its online platform www.wanfangdata.com.cn. English-language navigation and metadata are available for international researchers.

== Relationship to other databases ==
Within the ecosystem of Chinese academic information, Wanfang Data is often compared with CNKI (China National Knowledge Infrastructure) and CQVIP (VIP Chinese Journal Database). While CNKI holds the largest overall coverage, Wanfang Data is known for its collection of dissertations, technical standards, and medical databases, as well as relatively stable institutional pricing and government backing.

== See also ==
- CNKI
- CQVIP
- Academic publishing in China
