= Ambrose King =

Hong Kong sociologist (born 1935)

Ambrose Y.C. King SBS JP
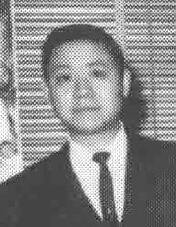
- King visiting the National Palace Museum in Taipei in November 1966

Vice-Chancellor of the Chinese University of Hong Kong
- In office 2002–2004
- Chancellor: Tung Chee-hwa
- Preceded by: Arthur Li
- Succeeded by: Lawrence Lau

Personal details
- Born: 14 February 1935 (age 91)
- Education: National Taiwan University (BA); National Chengchi University (MA); University of Pittsburgh (MA, PhD)
- Occupation: Professor of sociology
- Honorary Degrees: Hon DLitt (HKUST)

Ambrose King Yeo-chi
- Chinese: 金耀基
Transcriptions
Standard Mandarin
- Hanyu Pinyin: Jīn Yàojī
Yue: Cantonese
- Jyutping: gam1 jiu6 gei1

Ambrose King Yeo-chi, SBS, JP (Chinese: 金耀基; born 14 February 1935) is a Hong Kong sociologist, educator, writer and academic. He was formerly vice-chancellor of the Chinese University of Hong Kong (CUHK).

== Personal life ==
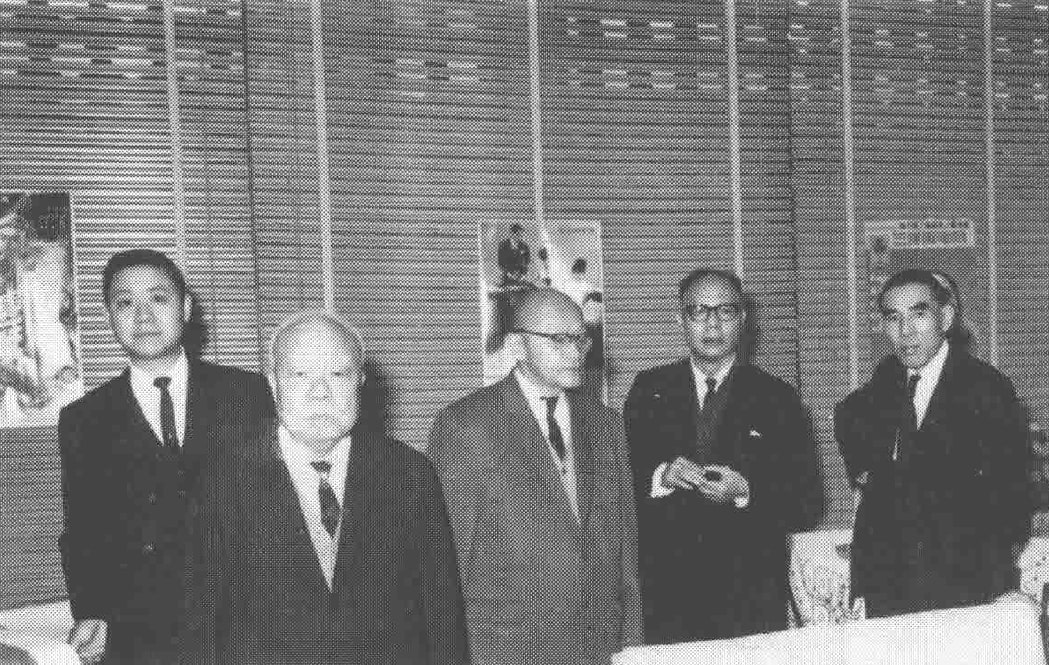
Ambrose King (first from left) and Wang Yun-wu (second from left) visiting the National Palace Museum in Taipei in November 1966

Ambrose King received most of his education in Taiwan. He graduated from Taipei Municipal Chenggong Senior High School, earned a B.A. from National Taiwan University and M.A. degree in political science from National Chengchi University. Then he went to the United States and earned his Ph.D. from the University of Pittsburgh in 1970.

== Career ==
After earning his PhD, he joined the Department of Sociology of CUHK in 1970. In 1974, he was promoted to Senior Lecturer, in 1979 to Reader and in 1983 to Professor of Sociology in CUHK. From 1977 to 1985, he served as Head of New Asia College and in 1989 he became Pro-Vice-Chancellor of the university before succeeding Arthur Li. In 2002 he was appointed Vice-Chancellor of CUHK, and retired in 2004. He is now a Professor of Sociology in the CUHK, teaching the course Individual and Society.

King has written essays; Cambridge Musings (1977), Heidelberg Musings (1986) and Ever in my Heart (2005). He is also a calligrapher.

== Research focus and contributions ==
His research interest are modernisation and modernity of China, and the role of tradition in social-cultural transformation. He employed the theoretical framework of Max Weber to study the development of Chinese culture in the process of modernisation. He also tried to measure the costs and benefits of modernisation after the breakdown of the old Chinese dynastic orders and clan systems in the late 19th century.

He wrote theses on Hong Kong society, including The Administrative Absorption of Politics in Hong Kong (1975), which argued that the British cooptation of local elites would lead to "synarchy", a form of joint rule; Social Life and Development in Hong Kong (1985); The Special Character of Hong Kong's Polity and its Democratic Prospects (1987); One Country, Two Systems: An Idea on Trial (1995); and Hong Kong: A City with the Most Traits of Modernity in Chinese Societies (2000). He held that to understand Hong Kong, one cannot overlook two important threads, namely, colonial rule and capitalism. He introduced the administrative absorption politics model (行政吸納政治) in 1975.

When he visited Cambridge University in 1975, he wrote his first essay on university education, entitled Two Cultures and Technological Humanism. In 1983 he published The Idea of a University, a work that was the fruit of many years of reflection and study. In 1994, he was elected a Fellow of Academia Sinica in Taiwan, and in the following years he has been honoured by many universities.

== Selected works ==
- China’s Great Transformation: Selected Essays on Confucianism, Modernization, and Democracy, 2018, Hong Kong: Chinese University Press
- "Chinese Religion." In Understanding Contemporary China. Edited by Gamer, R. New York: Lynn Reinner.
- The Idea of University (大學之理念), 2001, London: Oxford University Press
- Chinese Politics and Culture (中國政治與文化), 1997, London: Oxford University Press
- State Confucianism and Its Transformation: The Restructuring of the State-Society Relation in Taiwan and The Transformation of Confucianism in the Post-Confucian Era: The Emergence of Rationalistic Traditionalism in Hong Kong
  "Confucian Traditions in East Asian Modernity", 1996, edited by Tu Wei-ming. Cambridge, MA: Harvard University Press
- Chinese Society and Culture (中國社會與文化), 1992, London: Oxford University Press
- From Traditional to Modernised (從傳統到現代), 1992, London: Oxford University Press
- "The Political Culture of Kwun Tong: A Chinese Community in Hong Kong." Southeast Asian Journal of Social Science 5.1-2 (1977): 123–41.
- "Administrative Absorption of Politics in Hong Kong: Emphasis on the Grass Roots Level." Asian Survey 15.5 (1975): 422–39.

== Award ==
- Silver Bauhinia Star (1998)

== See also ==
- Chinese University of Hong Kong

Academic offices
Preceded by Arthur Li	Vice-Chancellor of the Chinese University of Hong Kong; 2002–2004	Succeeded by Lawrence Lau
