= School-Based Management Policy =

The School-Based Management Policy is an education policy within the Education Ordinance of the Education Bureau in Hong Kong. The policy was made law when The "Education (Amendment) Ordinance 2004" bill was passed by Legco in July 2004. Under the amended Education Ordinance, all Hong Kong primary and secondary schools are required to set up incorporated management committees, or IMCs, by the year 2010. In addition, the proportion of board members representing the school-sponsoring body will be reduced to 60% within the IMC, allowing teachers, parents, alumni and community members to make up the rest of the 40%. The bill also stipulates that all authorities and responsibilities of the IMC must be clearly defined by each school.

== Term ==
There are two different ways of referring to the School-Based Management Policy in both the Chinese and the English media. While all English-language media refer to the School-Based Management Policy as a "policy" within the ordinance (or simply referring to the bill), all Chinese-language media have collectively decided to refer to it as an "ordinance" rather than a "policy". The differences in the terms is self-evident in the made-up Chinese term 校本條例, literally meaning "School-Based Ordinance".

== Background ==
The Education and Manpower Bureau introduced the draft school-based management policy back in 2001. In November 2002, the draft "Education (Amendment) Ordinance 2002" bill was passed by Legco and gazetted. On 8 July 2004, the "Education (Amendment) Ordinance 2004" bill was approved by Legco, and after government gazetting, it became the "Education (Amendment) Ordinance 2004" bill. The School-Based Management Policy in the amended Education Ordinance came into force in January 2005. In July 2005, Legco approved a HK$350 million government funding for the setting up of IMCs at all government-aided schools.

== Implementation ==
=== Overall ===
Generally speaking, as of November 2006, 160 schools have set up IMCs, 50 are waiting for government approval, and around 100 have promised incorporation within the year. Around 400 church schools belonging to the Catholic and other major Christian organisations are still refusing to set up IMCs. The Education Bureau promised a policy review in 2008.

=== Exceptions ===
The Hong Kong Anglican Church operates around 150 schools. The school boards of approximately 80 of those, operate under the education ordinance and as such, are affected by the school-based management policy and cannot avoid the setting up of IMCs. Since school boards of around 70 others had existed prior to the establishment of the education ordinance, with some even enjoying the legal status of a statutory organisation, they are not affected in any way.

His Excellency Mr. Sukavich Rangsitpol Minister of Education, Thailand (1995–1997) laid out his plans for education in Thailand.

At the very beginning, the crucial element to be considered for education reform is the management system. The administrative power, in particular, has to be shifted to local authorities, and local participation in the school management is essentially encouraged. We cannot deny that people who know more about the educational needs of local people are those who work and live within that community.

Thailand has implemented School-based management (SBM) policy in 1997 to overcoming a profound crisis in the education system.

Establish effective Provincial Education Councils with strong community membership. The purpose of decentralization is to ensure that local education needs are met, there should be a close relationship between community representatives and officials. Thus, decentralization will require a careful balance between the guidance of community selected representatives and government officials. To representing local needs and priorities

== Sponsoring bodies' stances ==
=== Supporting ===
- Po Leung Kuk operates 43 primary and secondary schools. Their IMCs shall be set up in stages.
- The Hong Kong Buddhist Association operates 51 schools.
- Sik Sik Yuen operates 10 schools.

=== Neutral ===
- Tung Wah Group of Hospitals operates over 30 schools.

=== No stance ===
- The Hong Kong Taoist Association.

=== Opposing ===
After passage at Legco, the school-based management policy ran into fierce oppositions from the Catholic, Anglican, Methodist and other major church organisations whose schools make up to one quarter of all schools in Hong Kong. They feared the amended ordinance would reduce the churches' autonomy, dilute its power and even compromise the educational philosophy and moral and religious guidance of their schools. The setting up of IMCs, they say, would increase the risks of lawsuits and escalate the cost of insurance for the schools, ultimately bankrupting the churches.

== Timeline of opposition ==
- On 17 December 2003, the Education and Manpower Bureau raised the prospect of a cut in the 2004 education funding.

After passage of the amended bill, around 80 Anglican schools incorporated their boards as limited liability companies. The authorities of these 80 schools were then transferred to 2 limited liability companies set up by the Hong Kong Anglican Church. They are: Anglican (Hong Kong) Primary Schools Council Limited and Anglican (Hong Kong) Secondary Schools Council Limited.

- On 24 May 2004, the Education and Manpower Bureau alleged that the Anglican Church had remained silent during the whole 18 months after the gazetting of the bill. Their silence, EMB said, was very puzzling.
- On 6 June 2004, the Anglican Church's Education Secretary Timothy Ha fired back in a rebuttal, saying the EMB's statement on 24 May was totally incorrect. Ha stated that the Anglican Church had clearly expressed their stance on two separate occasions, in Sponsoring Bodies Association letters sent to the Education (Amendment) Ordinance 2002 committee at Legco on 10 March and 10 October 2003 respectively. Ha further stated that the Anglican Church had also attended several Legco hearings in which the church had unmistakably stated its legal worries associated with the bill, in full attendance of EMB officials. There was no way the EMB could deny knowledge of all these facts.

Cardinal Joseph Zen of the Catholic Church maintained that since Secretary Li had repeated the stance of the EMB like a broken record, the churches were forced to repeat their stance of "3 noes and 1 yes". 3 noes stand for, 1) This is not about democratisation or school-based management (of our schools); 2) This is not about transparency or accountability (of our schools); 3) The government's stubborn stance is not based on any consultations, discussions or any world educational trends. 1 yes stands for: The core of the matter is, the government wants the introduction of IMCs, that's their bottom line. To put it bluntly, the government wants to control every single school in Hong Kong by delegating authorities from school-sponsoring bodies to individual IMCs.

- On 5 July 2004, whilst attending an open forum organised by the Catholic Justice and Peace Committee at the St. Francis of Assisi Church in Shek Kip Mei, Cardinal Joseph Zen stated that the church would spend the next few years proving that Catholic schools could implement the spirit of the school-based management policy without the implementation of IMCs.
- On 8 July 2004, the amended Education Ordinance was passed by Legco with an 8-vote majority.
- On 11 July 2004, the Methodist Church reiterated its stance on the issue, saying that it would continue operating its schools with an open attitude, allowing teachers, parents and alumni members to be elected into its school boards. The Methodist Church stated that according to article 141 of the Basic Law, religious organisations were allowed to carry on operating schools under previous practices. The Church, it further stated, would firmly retain its current mode of operation which had been successful and effective in coordinating, leading and supporting its schools. It vehemently opposed to the mandatory setting up of IMCs at its schools and requested a Legco review that would ultimately allow different school-based management modes.
- On 10 October 2004, Timothy Ha stated that the bill was forcibly pushed through with a slim margin by the government who had amassed all the support it could muster.
- In May 2005, Cardinal Zen threatened to apply for a judicial review if Legco approved extra funds for schools that set up IMCs before the 2008–09 school year. After which, EMB Secretary Arthur Li told the cardinal to "calm down".
- On 20 June 2005, Legco members met representatives of various school-sponsoring religious groups which included the Catholic, Anglican, Methodist churches as well as the Hong Kong Taoist Association who blasted the government for rewarding with "treats" schools that joined the programme.
- On 16 October 2005, Principal Tse Chun-keung, the newly appointed Anglican Primary Schools Council director, stated that it was logically flawed for anyone to assume that transparency, openness and fairness would be achieved just by bringing in teachers, parents and alumni members into a school board.
- On 7 December 2005, the Catholic Diocese filed a writ for a judicial review on the amended Education Ordinance on the basis that it had violated the Basic Law.
- On 8 December 2005, Cardinal Zen stated that the Catholic Church would close and return a portion of the 97 Catholic schools to the government, if the church ultimately loses its legal battle and hence control of its church principles.
- On 12 June 2006, in the "Letter to Hong Kong" radio programme aired on the RTHK, the former Anglican Archbishop Peter Kwong stated that he hoped the school-based ordinance would not turn out to be an infamous piece of legislation because the public at large realised the ordinance contained a lot of loopholes and traps.
- From 12 to 13 October 2006, the High Court deliberated for 2 days in the judicial review of the school-based management policy.
- On 23 November 2006, the High Court ruled in favour of the Education and Manpower Bureau, saying that the Catholic Church had no absolute right in its authority over the management of its schools and that the ordinance had not violated the Basic Law.

After the High Court win by the Education and Manpower Bureau, Anglican Church Education Secretary Timothy Ha expressed his disappointments at the ruling before saying that the government had damaged the 150-year working partnership with the Anglican Church. Ha expressed Anglican support of the Catholic Church's move to appeal the ruling, saying Anglican schools might be taken over by the government otherwise. Ha said that all that they could do now was to make one move at a time. But he added, "Justice shall be on our side".
On the same day, the director of education of the Methodist Church, Rev. Yuen Tin-yau stated that although the school-based management policy had been ruled legitimate, yet legitimacy did not necessarily equate to reasonableness. The Methodist Church stated that they fully supported the introduction of parents, teachers and alumni into their school boards, yet they resolutely rejected the setting up of IMCs. The Methodist Church maintained that their school boards would never be incorporated. Chairman of the Aided Primary School Heads Association, Mr Choi Kai-chun stated that if the legal win had been important for the EMB then the winning of the hearts and mind of the general public would be more important.

- On 15 December 2006, the director of education of the Methodist Church, Rev. Yuen Tin-yau declared that the working partnership between the sponsoring bodies and the EMB had been damaged, "Everybody's a loser. It's meaningless as to who wins and who loses." Yuen hoped that there would be a review of the effectiveness of other school-based management methods when the EMB reviewed its policies in 2008. Cardinal Zen stated that "We (the Catholic Church) have been actively helping the government in the areas of education all these years. Yet it is absolutely callous for the government to be treating us in such a way at the moment." Secretary Li responded that the Cardinal should calm down and that he remained powerless if the Catholic Church were to resort to further lawsuits before expressing his regrets. The Secretary pointed out that after the establishment of IMCs, "Catholic students still has to pray and read the Bible" and thus would not affect the religious developments of the schools. The Secretary further questioned if it was (politically) correct not to grant a larger degree of democracy to schools in light of current (world) trend of democracy.
- In January 2007, the Catholic Diocese applied for an appeal to the judicial review ruling.
- On 30 November 2007, sources revealed that both the Catholic Church and the EMB were willing to resolve their differences through negotiations and perhaps settle the issue out of court, if church schools were allowed exemptions.
- On 14 March 2008, the Catholic Church and the Education Bureau jointly applied for an adjournment at the High Court in an attempt to resolve their differences and possibly reach an amicable settlement in the legal battle.

== See also ==
- Arthur Li
- Fanny Law
- Babel Fish Online Translation
