= Jacob Hen-Tov =

Israeli academician and author

- יעקב חן-טוב
- Born: 24 August 1932 (age 93); Tel Aviv, Mandatory Palestine
- Occupations: Professor author

Jacob Hen-Tov (Hebrew: יעקב חן-טוב; born 24 August 1932) is an Israeli-American academic specializing in the history and politics of Russia and the Middle East and the legal system of the former Soviet Union. He retired in 2003 from his position as Professor of Eurasian Studies at the George C. Marshall European Center for Security Studies in Garmisch-Partenkirchen, Germany.

== Education ==
Hen-Tov earned a LL.B. and B.A. in political science from Tel Aviv University in 1957 and 1959, respectively. In 1960, he received a Master of Arts in Middle Eastern and Russian history from Brandeis University, while also completing a Master of Laws (LL.M.) at Harvard Law School that same year. In 1963, he earned a second M.A. in Russian studies from Harvard University, then a Ph.D. in Russian and Middle Eastern studies in 1969 from Brandeis University, where he was supervised by Walter Laqueur.

== Career ==
Hen-Tov spent his early employment years as a teacher in the Israeli educational system and subsequently, after training as a journalist, became a correspondent in criminal and legal affairs and later a parliamentary correspondent for the Israeli daily newspaper Herut. He was also on the staff of the literary supplement of both Herut and Haboker (former Israeli daily newspapers). Upon the completion of his legal studies in Tel-Aviv, he did his internship as a lawyer in the law firm of Dr. Samuel Fischelev (who later served as Israel's ambassador to the Philippines).

In 1958, Hen-Tov moved to the United States. After receiving his graduate degrees at Harvard and Brandeis, he was appointed assistant professor of Russian studies at the College of the Holy Cross and then professor of history and political science at Worcester State University. From 1971-73, he was a visiting lecturer at the University of Haifa and the Israeli Technion. During 1969-72 and 1974–75, he was also an associate of the Harvard Russian Research Center.

In 1975, Hen-Tov assumed the position of professor of history and government at the U.S. Army Russian Institute (Department of Defense) in Garmisch-Partenkirchen, Germany. In 1993, when the institute expanded into the George C. Marshall European Center for Security Studies, he was appointed as professor of Eurasian studies until his retirement in 2003.

In addition to his position at the U.S. Russian Institute (and later the George C. Marshall Center), Hen-Tov was a lecturer of history and government at the University of Maryland's European Extension Program (1976–96), an adjunct associate professor of Soviet government at Georgetown University (1983–84), and an adjunct professor of international relations at the NATO Military Academy-SHAPE, in Oberammergau, Germany (1981–88).

== Awards ==
- Merrill Trust Foundation Grant, Philip W. Lown Institute, Brandeis University, 1970
- Foundation for Jewish Culture Grant, 1971
- Certificate of Distinguished Service 1976-1996, University of Maryland, European Division
- Award for Outstanding Dedication and Support, NATO School, "Shape" Europe, February 1981-March 1988
- George C. Marshall Center, Department of Defense, Superior Civilian Service Award, August 2012

== Publications ==
Books:

- Communism and Zionism in Palestine: The Comintern and the Political Unrest in the 1920s, Cambridge, Mass: Schenkman Publishing Company, 1974.
- Communism and Zionism in Palestine during the British Mandate, with a preface by Isaiah Friedman, New Brunswick, USA: Transaction Publishers, 2012.
- Palestinian Jewry in Support of the Soviet Union during the Second World War 1941-45, anticipated publication date 2015 with Transaction Publishers.

Articles:

- "On the Demarcation Line between Political Geography and Geopolitics" (in Hebrew), International Studies, Tel-Aviv, spring 1957. The Communist International, the Palestine Communist Party and the Political Unrest in Palestine in 1929, monograph, Worcester, Mass: Worcester State College Press, April 1970.
- "The Communist International and the Communist Party in Palestine," in Forces of Change in the Middle East, ed. Roumani, Worcester, Mass: Worcester State College Press, 1971, pp. 11–43.
- "Contacts between Soviet Ambassador Maisky and Zionist Leaders during World War II," in Soviet Jewish Affairs, London, 1978, pp. 46–56.
- "The Middle East in Turmoil," in Proceedings, U.S. Naval Institute, December 1984, pp. 52–59.

Anthologies:

- Nationalism, Ethnic Conflicts and Territorial Disputes in the Russian Federation. An Anthology of Readings, Compiled and Introduced, George C. Marshall European Center for Security Studies, Garmisch, Germany, 1991.
- Nationality and Ethnic Issues: Ukraine, Belarus, Caucasus. An Anthology of Readings, Compiled and Introduced, George C. Marshall European Center for Security Studies, Garmisch, Germany, 1993.
- Nationalism, Ethnic Conflicts and Territorial Disputes in the Central Asian Republics of Kazakhstan, Kyrgyzstan, Tajikistan, Turkmenistan and Uzbekistan, An Anthology of Readings, Compiled and Introduced, George C. Marshall European Center for Security Studies, Garmisch, Germany, 1999.
- The Soviet Union and the Middle East: A Political Atlas, edited and introduced, George C. Marshall European Center for Security Studies, Garmisch, Germany, 2000.
- The Comintern and the Middle East 1925-1939. An Anthology of Documents from the International Press Correspondence (Imprecorr), George C. Marshall European Center for Security Studies, Garmisch, Germany, 2001.
