= Arthur Li =

Hong Kong doctor and politician

The Honourable Arthur Li Kwok-cheung GBM, GBS, JP
- 李國章
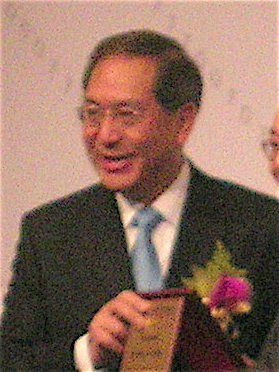

Vice-Chancellor of Chinese University of Hong Kong
- In office 1996–2002
- Chancellor: Chris Patten; Tung Chee-hwa
- Preceded by: Charles Kao
- Succeeded by: Ambrose King

Secretary for Education and Manpower
- In office 1 July 2002 – 30 June 2007
- Chief Executive: Donald Tsang
- Preceded by: Fanny Law
- Succeeded by: Michael Suen

Personal details
- Born: 27 June 1945 (age 81) Hong Kong, Empire of Japan
- Spouse: Diana Chester
- Relations: Koon-chun Li (great grandfather); Fook-shu Li (father); Tze-ha Wu (mother); David Li (brother)

Arthur Li
- Traditional Chinese: 李國章
- Simplified Chinese: 李国章
Transcriptions
Standard Mandarin
- Hanyu Pinyin: Lǐ Guózhāng
Yue: Cantonese
- Jyutping: lei5 gwok3 zoeng1

Arthur Li Kwok-cheung, GBM, GBS JP (Chinese: 李國章; born 27 June 1945) is a Hong Kong doctor and politician. He is currently member of the Executive Council of the Hong Kong Special Administrative Region and the chairman of the Council of the University of Hong Kong (HKU). He was Vice-Chancellor of the Chinese University of Hong Kong (CUHK) from 1996 to 2002 and Secretary for Education and Manpower from 2002 to 2007. Li's dictatorial and ruthless leadership style led some to refer to him as "King Arthur" and even "the Tsar". He is the grandson of the co-founder of the Bank of East Asia, Li Koon-chun, and brother of its current chairman, David Li. He was awarded the Grand Bauhinia Medal (GBM) by the Hong Kong SAR Government in 2017.

== Life and career ==
Li was born into the prominent Li family. His grandfather, Li Koon-chun, was the founder of the Bank of East Asia. His father, Li Fook-shu, was the unofficial member of the Executive Council and Legislative Council. His brother, David Li Kwok-po, succeeded his father to become the chairman of the Bank of East Asia and member of the Legislative Council.

An alumnus of St. Paul's Co-educational College and a classmate of Professor Lawrence J. Lau, Li received his medical training at the University of Cambridge. He was subsequently trained at Middlesex Hospital Medical School and Harvard Medical School, before returning to Hong Kong to become the founding chairman of the Department of Surgery and Dean of the Faculty of Medicine at the Chinese University of Hong Kong.

Li's tenure as Secretary for Education and Manpower was marked by an era of education reforms that included the School-Based Management Policy. Since 2000, the Education and Manpower Bureau has implemented a number of mandates, including having teachers spend more time with students outside the classroom, adding exams for subjects such as English and history, and ordering that teachers take benchmark assessments to prove their language abilities. Li ostensibly retired from public service in 2007.

In the role, he caused controversy by proposing mergers first between Chinese University and Hong Kong University of Science and Technology, and later between Chinese University and the Hong Kong Institute of Education.

Li's appointment by CY Leung to the governing board of the University of Hong Kong in 2015 has been met with strong criticism, particularly from academic staff (mostly pro-democrats): a poll has shown most to have little to no confidence that Li will uphold academic freedom. Further, Li's general attitude towards staff has been said to be 'hostile' and 'critical'.

Six months later, when it became known that Li was likely to take over the chairmanship of the Council upon the expiry of the term of Edward Leong on 6 November, there was further strong opposition, with 87 percent of members of HKU Academic Staff Association and almost three-quarters of members of the Professional Teachers Union opposed, due to his stance during the University of Hong Kong pro-vice-chancellor selection controversy.

In December 2018, Li was reappointed for a second three-year term to the council. His reappointment elicited criticism from the Hong Kong University Students' Union. Academic Staff Association chairman William Cheung Sing-wai expressed that "there has been a chilling effect" during Li's tenure.

In December 2021, Li criticized Hong Kong's Pillar of Shame, calling it a lie and claiming it was not built to honour those killed in the 1989 Tiananmen Square massacre.

=== Reputation ===
His leadership style has seen him being referred to as "King Arthur" or even "the Tsar".

== Personal life ==
He was married to Diana Chester, a registered nurse and graduate of New Hall College, Cambridge University who died in 2013.

Li owns more than 40 properties. In August 2023, his declaration of interests showed that he owned more than 30 properties in Hong Kong, and 2 properties in the United Kingdom.

== Appointments ==
Before his appointment, Li was Vice-Chancellor of the Chinese University of Hong Kong (CUHK), as well as:

- Professor of Surgery and Dean of the Faculty of Medicine, CUHK
- Member of the Education Commission and Member of the Committee on Science and Technology
- Member of the Hong Kong Hospital Authority
- Member of the Hong Kong Medical Council
- Member of the University Grants Committee
- Member of the College of Surgeons of Hong Kong
- Member of the Hospital Governing Committee of United Christian Hospital, Kwun Tong, Hong Kong
- Member of the board of directors of the Hong Kong Science and Technology Parks Corporation
- Member of the Hong Kong Applied Science and Technology Research Institute
- Vice-president of the Association of university presidents of China
- Patron of the Royal College of Surgeons of Great Britain and Ireland
- Regent of the Royal College of Surgeons of Edinburgh
- Honorary Fellow of the American Surgical Association
- Hon Fellow of the America College of Surgeons
- Hon Fellow of the Royal College of Surgeons of Ireland and Glasgow
- Hon Fellow of the Royal Society of Medicine

== See also ==
- Politics of Hong Kong
- Executive Council of Hong Kong
- Four big families of Hong Kong
- School-Based Management Policy
- University of Hong Kong pro-vice-chancellor selection controversy

Academic offices
Preceded by Charles K. Kao	Vice-Chancellor of the Chinese University of Hong Kong; 1996–2002	Succeeded by Ambrose King
Preceded by Dr Leong Che-hung	Chairman of the Council of the University of Hong Kong; 2015–present	Incumbent
Political offices
Preceded by Matthew Cheung as Director of Education	Secretary for Education and Manpower; 2002–2007	Succeeded by Michael Suen as Secretary for Education
Preceded by Fanny Law	Secretary for Education and Manpower; 2002–2007	Succeeded by Michael Suen as Secretary for Education
Order of precedence
Preceded by Horace Cheung; Deputy Secretary for Justice	Hong Kong order of precedence Non-official member of the Executive Council	Succeeded by Jeffrey Lam; Non-official member of the Executive Council
