= Timothy Ha =

Timothy Ha Wing-Ho
- Born: 1937; Guangzhou, China

Timothy Ha Wing-ho MBE, JP (Chinese: 夏永豪; pinyin: Xià Yǒngháo; born 1937), is the former Supervisor and Principal of St. Paul's College, Hong Kong, as well as Education Secretary of the Hong Kong Sheng Kung Hui (Hong Kong Anglican Church (Episcopal)) and Chairman of the Hong Kong Association of Sponsoring Bodies of Schools. Ha, who is in his late 60s, is still a prominent figure in the education sector of Hong Kong and has recently been very outspoken, in particular concerning the government's proposed education reforms.

Timothy Ha received his early education in Munsang College and Diocesan Boys' School (DBS). He was then admitted to The University of Hong Kong, where he studied history. Upon attaining his BA degree, he started his career as a teacher in DBS, in 1960. In 1968, Ha was appointed Principal of St. Paul's College, which is the flagship school of the Anglican Church and oldest educational institution in Hong Kong, and also the alma mater of his father and grandfather.

Under Ha's leadership, St. Paul's College underwent several major projects, including renovations and restructuring of the school premises as well as changes to the school management and funding structure, by participation in the Direct Subsidy Scheme in 2002.

Outside St. Paul's College, Ha has also been very active in education-related policy making. He has served as either chairman or member of many education-related committees. In 1991, he was appointed a member of the Legislative Council (i.e. legislature of Hong Kong) by the then Governor to serve a four-year term. In 1994, Ha was involved in an incident concerning his expenses claim of public funds to buy electronic Bibles. Ha managed to withstand media criticism, but had not gone for a second term in the LegCo as all appointed seats in LegCo were turned to elected seats in 1995.

Timothy Ha was also involved in tertiary education. He took part in the establishment committee of the Hong Kong University of Science and Technology. Indeed, he was the one to give the university its current name. He has been a member of the Court of The University of Hong Kong.

As the Education Secretary of Hong Kong Sheng Kung Hui, he has been responsible for the education policies of the Anglican Church, which is currently the second largest sponsoring body of schools, after the Catholic Diocese of Hong Kong. Recently, the government has suggested major education reforms including the restructuring of school governing boards and the taking over of school management controls. Ha, representing the Anglican Church, joined the outspoken Bishop Zen Ze-kiun of the Catholic Church in opposing the School-Based Management Policy reforms, including threatening to take legal actions to deter the government's initiatives.

Timothy Ha was originally expected to retire as Supervisor and Principal of St. Paul's College in August 2005, after 37 years of service. However, the Principal-elect abruptly turned down the offer in June 2005 and Ha was expected to continue to serve for at least one more academic year, even after the hosting of a farewell dinner in his honour on July 9, 2005. On December 19, 2005, Ha announced that he shall be retiring on March 1, 2006, and Dr. John Richard Kennard will succeed his principalship.

Ha was appointed a Justice of the Peace in 1986 and was honoured with an MBE in 1989.

== See also ==
- School-Based Management Policy

Academic offices
Preceded by Mr. R.G. Wells	Principal of St. Paul's College, Hong Kong; 1968–2006	Succeeded by Dr. John Richard Kennard
