= Li Fook-shu =

Li Fook-shu OBE

Unofficial Member of the Executive Council

Appointed Member of the Legislative Council
- In office 7 June 1961 – 26 June 1968

Personal details
- Born: May 30, 1912
- Died: May 21, 1995 (aged 82)
- Spouse: Daisy Woo Tze-Ha
- Relations: Li Shek Pang (grandfather)
- Children: Jeanette Li Chi Duen; Jennifer Li Chi Ping; David Li; Arthur Li
- Parent: Li Koon Chun (father)

Li Fook-shu, OBE, FCA, JP (Chinese: 李福樹; 30 May 1912 – 21 May 1995) was a Hong Kong businessman and politician. He was the chairman of the Bank of East Asia and unofficial member of the Executive Council and the Legislative Council.

== Biography ==
Li was born on 30 May 1912 in Hong Kong to Li Koon-chun, a prominent business family in Hong Kong. He was educated in England and was the obtained qualifications as an accountant. He is also member of the Institute of Chartered Accountants in England and Wales.

Li succeeded his father to become chairman of the Bank of East Asia, his own family business. He stepped down and became the director of the Bank of East Asia from 1989, until his death in 1995. He also sat on the board of directors of the Hong Kong Telephone Company, the Hong Kong Tramways, the Hong Kong and China Gas Company, the China Provident Company, the Chinese Estates Holdings and the Rediffusion (Hong Kong) Limited. He was also a Council member of Chinese University of Hong Kong.

He was appointed unofficial member of the Legislative Council of Hong Kong on 1 July 1962, succeeding Kwok Chan. He kept on serving on the Legislative Council in 1968. He was also unofficial member of the Executive Council of Hong Kong. During the Hong Kong 1967 Leftist Riots, he called for solidarity of the Hong Kong society against the riots. For his public services, he was awarded the Officer of the Order of the British Empire (OBE).

== Family ==
Li was the third son of Li Koon-chun. He married Daisy Li Woo Tze-ha, daughter of Woo Hey-tung and sister of former member of the Executive Council and the Legislative Council Woo Pak-chuen, on 26 March 1936. The couple had four children, David Li Kwok-po, Arthur Li Kwok-cheung, Jeanette Li Chi-duen and Jennifer Li Chi-ping.

David Li succeeded his father to become the chairman of the Bank of East Asia and member of the Executive and Legislative Councils. Arthur Li was a vice-chancellor of the Chinese University of Hong Kong, former Secretary for Education and Manpower and member of the Executive Council.

== See also ==
- Four big families of Hong Kong
