= 2015 University of Hong Kong pro-vice-chancellor selection controversy =

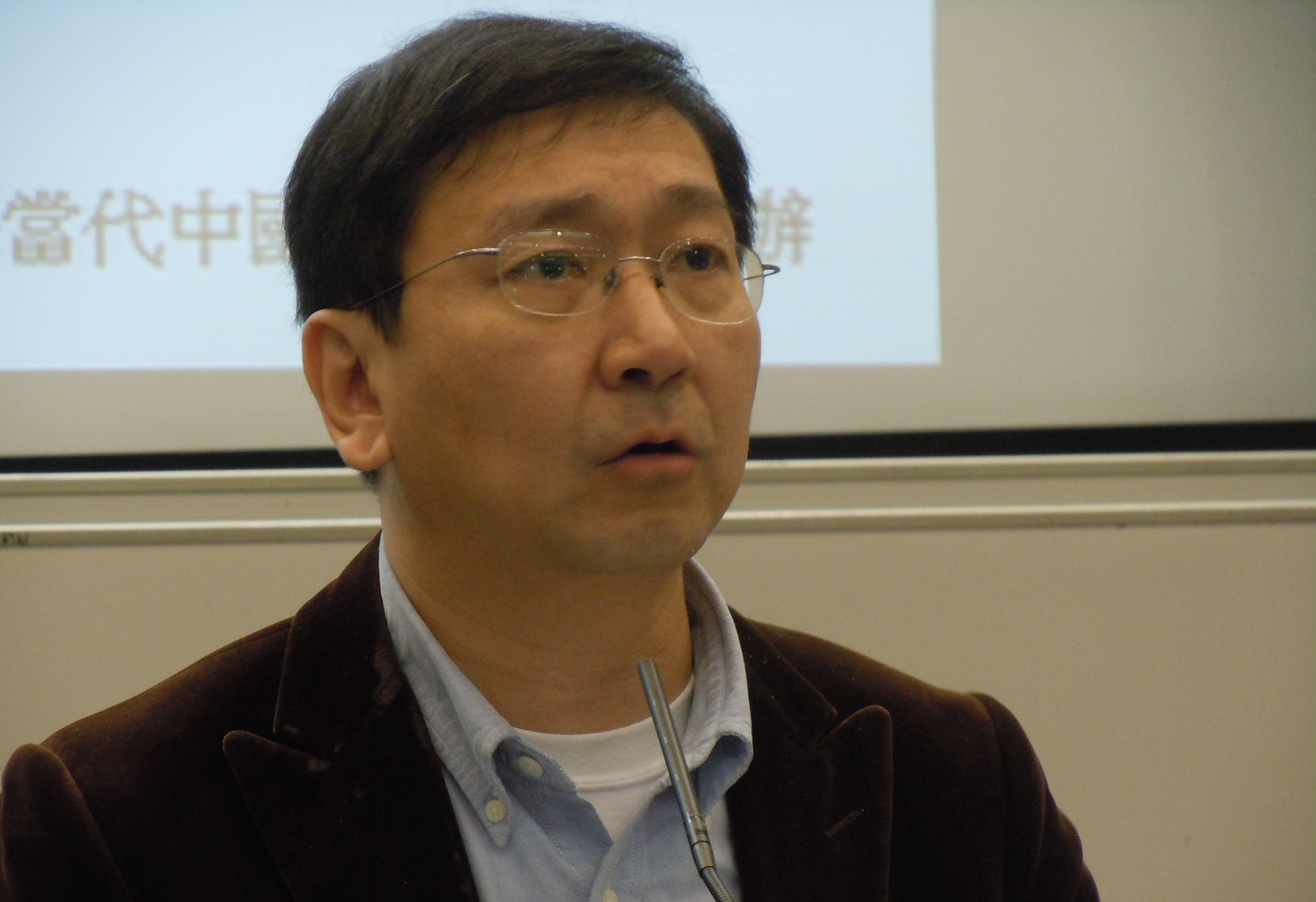
Johannes Chan, whose rejection by the university's governing council sparked the controversy

The 2015 University of Hong Kong pro-vice-chancellor selection controversy surrounded alleged political interference behind the University of Hong Kong governing council's rejection of Johannes Chan's recommended appointment to the post of pro-vice-chancellor in charge of staffing and resources. Chan, dean of the Faculty of Law from 2002 until 2014, was unanimously recommended for the post by a selection committee headed by university president Peter Mathieson.

The governing council's decision, the first time that a candidate selected by the committee was rejected, was widely viewed as political retaliation for Chan's involvement with pro-democratic figures including his former subordinate Benny Tai. A majority of HKU Council members are not students or staff of the university, and many are directly appointed by the chief executive of Hong Kong (who at that time was Leung Chun-ying). The decision received international condemnation, and was viewed as part of a Beijing-backed curtailing of academic freedoms that would damage Hong Kong's academic reputation.

== Background ==
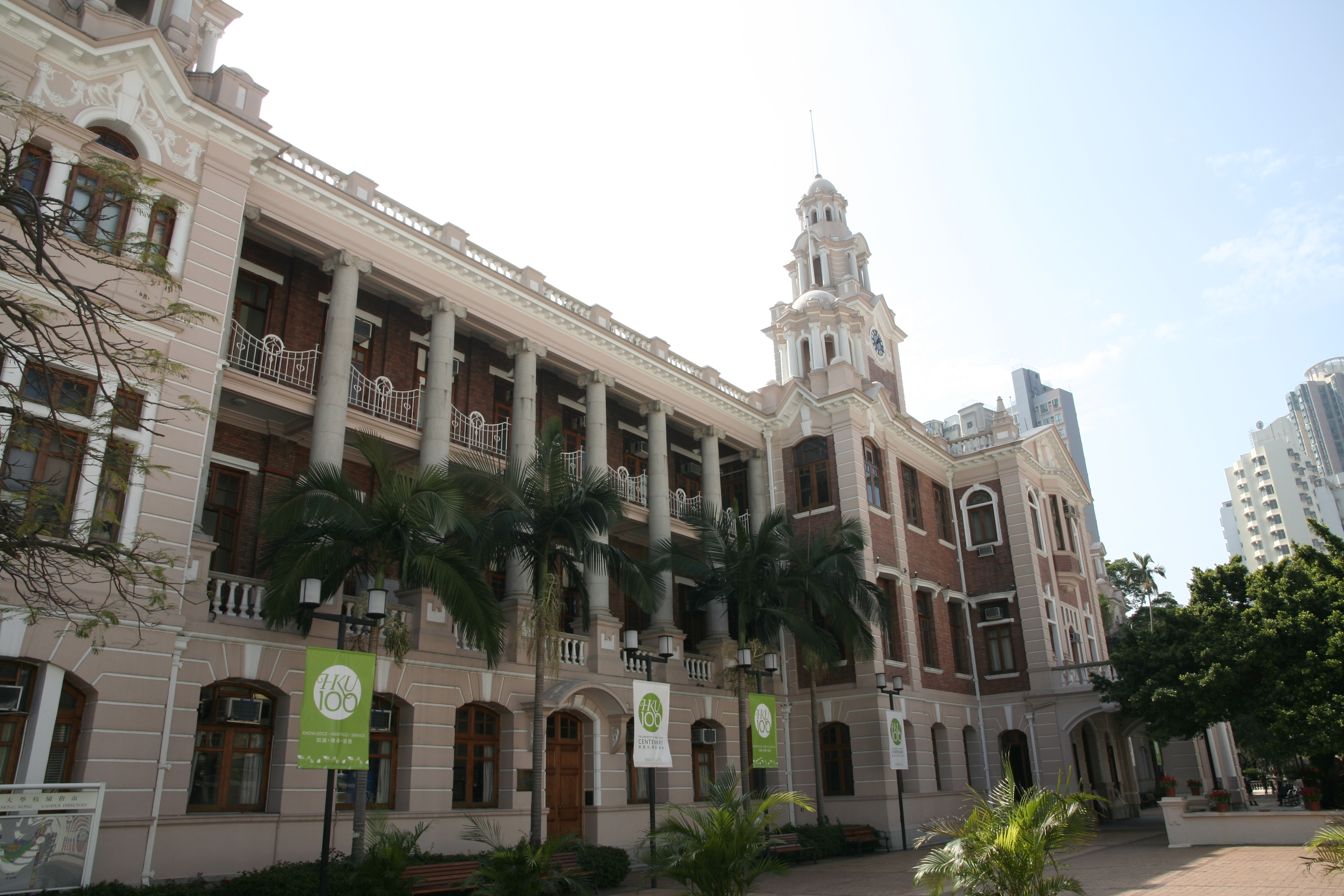
The University of Hong Kong

=== Selection ===
All pro-vice-chancellors of the University of Hong Kong are recommended by a search committee comprising the university president and vice-chancellor and other members selected by the HKU Council.

The selection committee unanimously recommended the council appoint Johannes Chan to the pro-vice-chancellor post responsible for staffing and resources, a position that had been left vacant for five years. Chan, who served as dean of the Faculty of Law from 2002 until 2014, is a distinguished scholar in constitutional law and human rights and "a vocal critic on Hong Kong's political reform issues". Chan is the only honorary senior counsel of the Hong Kong Bar, a title bestowed in 2003 light of his "pivotal role in the education of Hong Kong's future lawyers" and his commitment to upholding human rights.

=== Concerted attack by pro-CCP media ===
Owing to his liberal political stance, criticism of Chan by media controlled by the Chinese Communist Party (CCP) was stepped up as soon as his candidacy for the post became known. He was derided in Ta Kung Pao and Wen Wei Po, which together published more than 350 articles attacking him and accusing him of "meddling in politics" for his involvement with pro-democratic figures including his former subordinate Benny Tai. CCP-controlled tabloid newspaper Global Times also bashed Chan, calling him a "ringleader" of the 2014 pro-democratic protests. Chan's treatment in Beijing-controlled media has been described as a smear campaign and character assassination.

=== Council composition ===
The HKU Council normally comprises 24 members, although in mid-2015 two seats were vacant and Margaret Leung served in two roles. Two further members, Yuen Kwok-yung and Aloysius Arokiaraj, resigned in July but continued to serve on the council until their replacements were elected. The council's Guide and Code of Practice includes a confidentiality clause. It was updated in August 2015 to state that "it is absolutely necessary to keep confidential the council agenda, supporting papers and minutes", while the previous version (from 2004) had stated less strictly, "it is normally necessary".

The decision not to appoint Chan is seen as a pro-government act of retaliation against "pro-democracy leaders and participants" and a blow to academic freedom. This is partly because six members of the council are directly appointed by the Chief executive of Hong Kong, who acts as chancellor of all publicly funded tertiary institutions in the territory. Five members are delegates to the National People's Congress in Beijing, and as such are obliged to toe the Communist Party line or otherwise risk expulsion. In overall council makeup, university students and staff are outnumbered by members from outside the university.

The composition of the council at the time of Chan's rejection was as follows:

Name	Chinese name	Role	Notes
Edward Leong	梁智鴻	Chairman	Physician, former LegCo member
Benjamin P.C. Hung	洪丕正	Six persons, not being students or employees of the university, appointed by the Chancellor	CEO of Standard Chartered Bank
Leonie M.F. Ki	紀文鳳	Six persons, not being students or employees of the university, appointed by the Chancellor	New World Development director, Chinese People's Political Consultative Conference (CPPCC) deputy
Ayesha M. Lau	劉麥嘉軒	Six persons, not being students or employees of the university, appointed by the Chancellor	Partner, KPMG
Arthur Li	李國章	Six persons, not being students or employees of the university, appointed by the Chancellor	Former education minister and vice-chancellor of CUHK, CPPCC deputy
Margaret Leung	梁高美懿	Six persons, not being students or employees of the university, appointed by the Chancellor	Deputy chairman and managing director, Chong Hing Bank; CPPCC deputy
Martin Liao	廖長江	Six persons, not being students or employees of the university, appointed by the Chancellor	Legislator, National People's Congress deputy
Peter K.K. Wong	黃景強	Six persons, not being students or employees of the university, appointed by the Council	Engineer, CPPCC deputy
Edward Chen	陳坤耀	Six persons, not being students or employees of the university, appointed by the Council	Former vice-chancellor of Lingnan University
Abraham Shek	石禮謙	Six persons, not being students or employees of the university, appointed by the Council	Lawmaker; CPPCC deputy
Wong Kai-man	黃啓民	Six persons, not being students or employees of the university, appointed by the Council	Director of China Construction Bank and SCMP Group
(vacant)		Six persons, not being students or employees of the university, appointed by the Council	
(vacant)		Six persons, not being students or employees of the university, appointed by the Council	
Man Cheuk Fei	文灼非	Two persons, not being students or employees of the university, elected by the Court	Journalist
Rosanna Wong	王䓪鳴	Two persons, not being students or employees of the university, elected by the Court	Director of Hong Kong Federation of Youth Groups; CPPCC deputy
Peter Mathieson	馬斐森	President and Vice-Chancellor	Nephrologist
Margaret Leung	梁高美懿	Treasurer	
Cheung Kie-chung	張祺忠	Four full-time teachers elected in accordance with regulations	Engineer
Sun Kwok	郭新	Four full-time teachers elected in accordance with regulations	Astronomer
Lo Chung-mau	盧寵茂	Four full-time teachers elected in accordance with regulations	Surgeon
Yuen Kwok-yung	袁國勇	Four full-time teachers elected in accordance with regulations	Microbiologist
Felix K.Y. Ng	吳國恩	One full-time employee of the university, not being a teacher, elected in accordance with regulations	Composer
Billy Fung Jing-en	馮敬恩	One full-time undergraduate student elected in accordance with regulations	President of the Hong Kong University Students' Union
Aloysius Wilfred Raj Arokiaraj	n/a	One full-time postgraduate student elected in accordance with regulations	Postgraduate Student Association president
Footnotes:

== Events ==
Customarily the HKU Council accepts the recommendations of search committees for senior posts, with no prior recommendation having been rejected by the council in the university's history.

=== Chan's appointment delayed ===
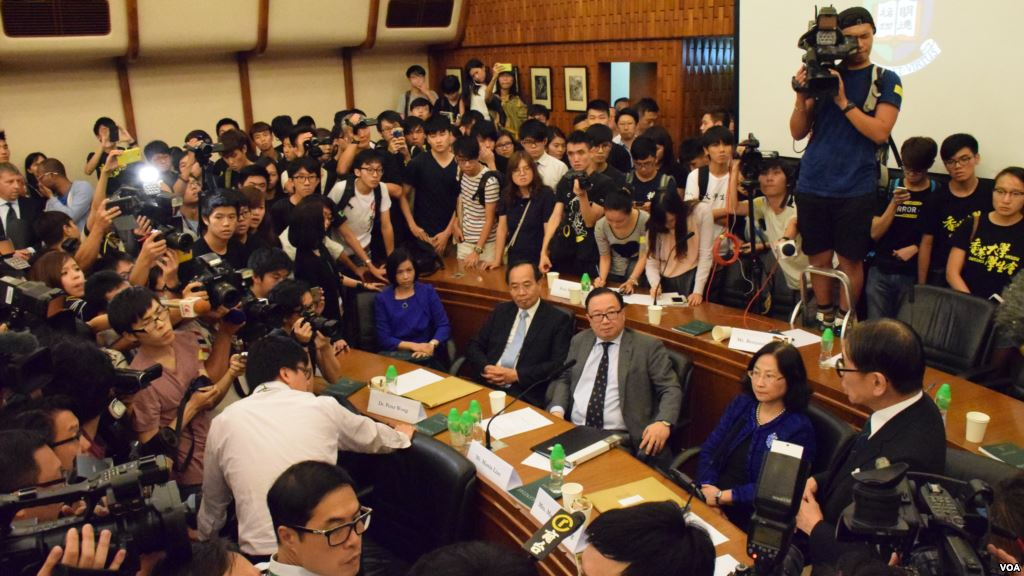
Students storm the conference room on 28 July after the HKU council votes again to delay Chan's appointment

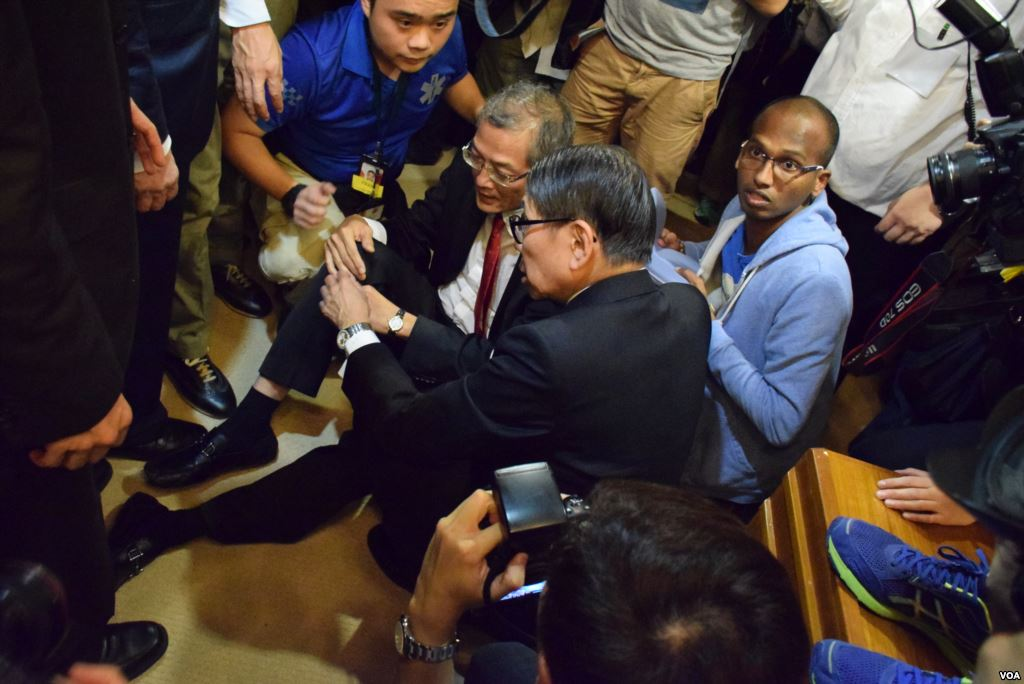
Lo Chung-mau on the ground, clutching his knee

The university initiated a worldwide search for five pro-vice-chancellors in mid-2014. Two of them, Ian Holliday and Douglas So, were appointed in November 2014. Another two, Andy Hor and John Kao, were appointed in March 2015 to commence employment in September 2015. The sole candidate for position of pro-vice-chancellor (academic staffing and resources), recommended by unanimity, was Johannes Chan. The news of the selection committee's recommendation was broken by Wen Wei Po in a feature report "in the best interest of the public" even before the HKU council had been informed of the selection. Chan then became the target of a concerted attack by Wen Wei Po and Ta Kung Po for his academic record. Wen Wei Po, citing from a leaked University Grants Commission report, stated that Chan's academic record on research was not up to international standards while he was dean of the law school. The journal accused Chan of being so busy with politics that he neglected research.

According to an article by Kevin Lau in Ming Pao, parties close to the government applied pressure on committee members behind the scenes to block Chan's appointment. Chief executive Leung Chun-ying was reported to have telephoned members of the committee to persuade them to vote against Chan's appointment, whilst Sophia Kao, member of the Central Policy Unit, admitted that she may have mentioned Chan's candidature to someone "casually" but said she did not recall with whom and in what context. CY Leung's lieutenant Fanny Law, who was found to have interfered with institutional autonomy in 2007 whilst serving as education secretary, categorically denied having intervened. Leung also denied allegations he intervened in the selection. However, i-Cable and South China Morning Post subsequently revealed that CY Leung had convened at least three meetings with Peter Mathieson within four months during the period the decision was being deferred. On one occasion, Leung allegedly met Mathieson with HKU council chairman Leong Chee-hung and education secretary Eddie Ng. Although Ng said he had no recollection of the meeting, the Office of the Chief executive did not deny that such a meeting had taken place.

The council was criticised when it repeatedly deferred the decision to appoint Chan, stating that it should wait until a new provost was in place. The decision was repeatedly delayed through votes on 30 June and 28 July. Just after the council voted down a motion to stop delaying the appointment at the latter meeting, dozens of students rushed into the conference room in protest. During the incident, council member Lo Chung-mau fell down and alleged he was pushed over. He said his knee was injured; he reported this to the police and was taken to hospital. Students' union president Billy Fung expressed disbelief that Lo was injured by a student. Online videos appeared to show Lo fainting or falling on his own.

The students' storming of the conference was denounced by vice-chancellor Peter Mathieson, as well as the ten university deans who issued a statement urging "all parties to put the interest of the university first" and expressing conviction in the guarantee of academic freedom and university autonomy by the Hong Kong Basic Law Article 137. Council member Arthur Li compared the students to the Red Guards of the Cultural Revolution who tortured intellectuals.

On the other hand, 15 ex-presidents of the university released a joint statement supporting the students and expressing regret that Mathieson and the incumbent university deans had condemned the protest. The presidents called the demonstration a "righteous action of the students to safeguard the academic freedom and university's autonomy." They said the composition of the current council, stacked with pro-government members from outside the university, violated the principle of institutional autonomy. Billy Fung said that the storming of the conference room helped bring the issue into the public spotlight.

Following the postponement of 30 June, the postgraduate student representative, Aloysius Arokiaraj, resigned from the council in frustration, stating that the decisions "[fell] short of my expected standards". Though he tendered his resignation on 3 July, Arokiaraj remained on the council so that the position was not left vacant while a replacement is found. At the meeting on 28 July Arokiaraj voted against the deferral but in a letter to the South China Morning Post he criticised students' angry conduct during the storming of the conference room.

Respected microbiologist Yuen Kwok-yung, considered a "neutral party" in the controversy, also resigned following the incident. He criticised both the students and the university governance, stating that he was "incapable of dealing with the politics in the university council". He dismissed Arthur Li's likening of the students to Red Guards, stating that the behaviour of the Hong Kong students was not as serious. Like Arokiaraj, Yuen continued to serve on the council until his replacement was elected.

By the end of July an alumni concern group had collected more than 3,000 signatures demanding the council stop delaying the decision. It was signed by numerous legislators and HKU alumni including Ip Kin-yuen, Sin Chung-kai, Alan Leong, Tanya Chan, Audrey Eu, Paul Zimmerman, Joseph Wong, Anson Chan, Andrew Wong, and others. Mathieson complained that he and others who had backed the appointment of Johannes Chan as pro-vice-chancellor had been subjected to "orchestrated" pressure by some political elements, his personal emails having been hacked and some of it published in pro-Beijing media.

=== HKU alumni non-binding vote ===
On 1 September 2015 the HKU Convocation, a body of more than 162,000 alumni and faculty, convened an Extraordinary General Meeting at the Hong Kong Convention and Exhibition Centre to hold a vote on the issue. Audit firm BDO International was hired to independently count the votes. Of 9,298 votes cast, 7,821 alumni voted to support the recommendation of Chan to the post, although the motion would not be binding on the university council. Another motion that called for the council to confirm the appointment of a pro-vice-chancellor within 30 days of committee recommendation got overwhelming support. The convocation conveners sent the results to the university council with the expectation that the result would put greater pressure on the council to consider the wishes of alumni.

=== Council vote ===
On 29 September, the council rejected Chan's appointment (12 votes to 8) through a secret ballot in a closed meeting; no reason for the decision was disclosed. Political motivations were widely suspected and the opacity of the council criticised. At the suggestion of a council member, all phones had been taken away and sealed in envelopes for the duration of the meeting to prevent anyone leaking information to the media. During the meeting, dozens of protesters from two pro-Beijing groups stood outside the venue and denigrated Chan as "incompetent". Psychology professor Terry Kit-Fong Au was appointed acting pro-vice-chancellor in January 2016 and to the regular position in May 2016.

=== Billy Fung disclosures ===
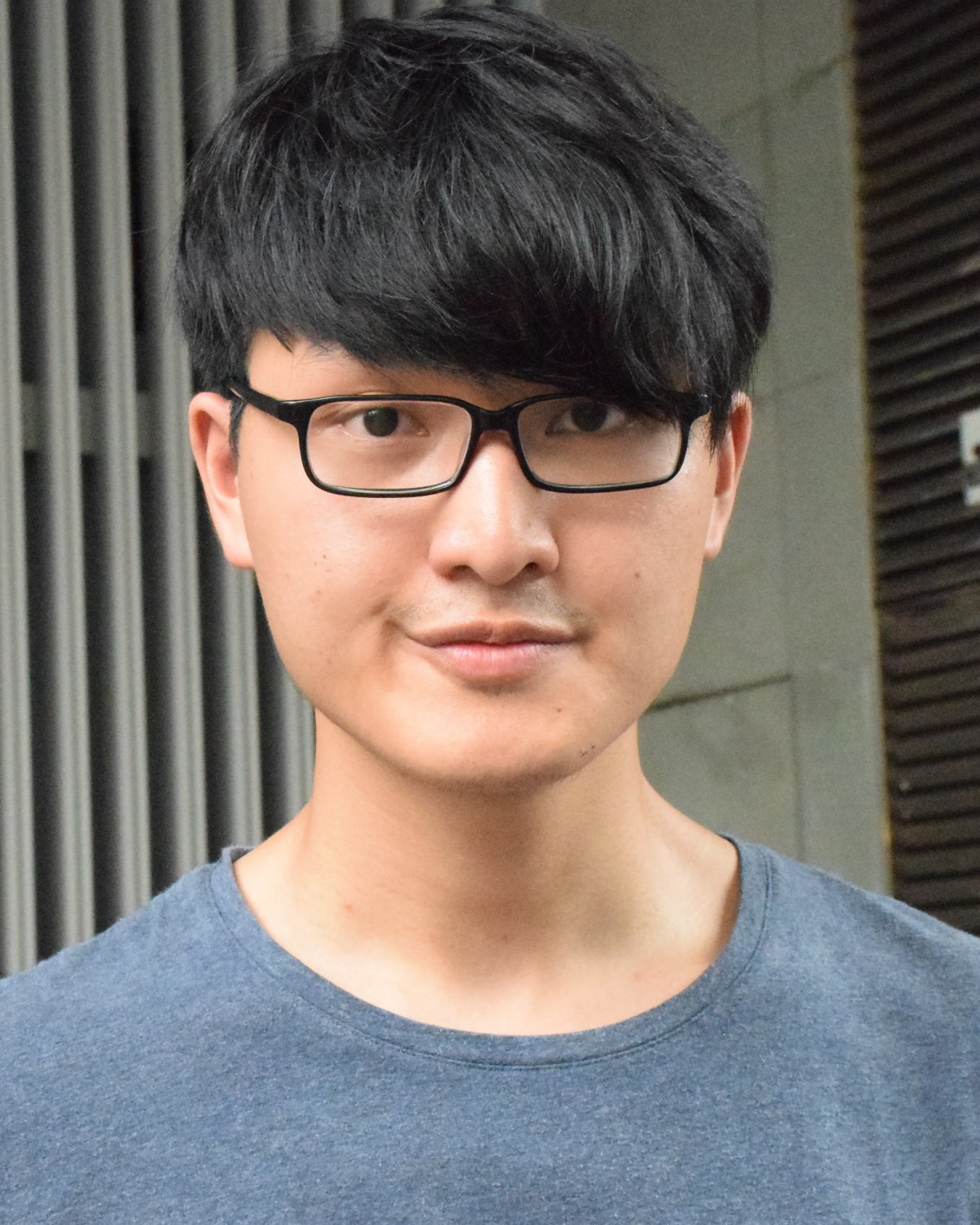
Student representative Billy Fung

Billy Fung, attending the meeting as president of the Hong Kong University Students' Union, stated that some council members said Chan was not qualified to be pro-vice-chancellor because he lacked a doctorate degree, and quoted member Arthur Li as stating that Chan may have been appointed dean of law simply because he is a "nice guy"; Lo Chung-mau complained that Chan had not shown him enough sympathy after he fell down during the meeting of 28 July. Fung said that of the eight who voted for Chan's appointment, seven were staff and students of the university.

HKU Council chairman Edward Leong called Fung's leak a "deplorable action", accusing him of using "dishonest means to achieve his aim". He said that if the council discussions were open, it would discourage free discussion. Other council members criticised Fung's integrity, but refused to reveal what they had said during the meeting. Council members Lo Chung-mau and Arthur Li accused Fung of lying about the discussions. Leonie Ki, another council member, alleged that Fung's English language proficiency was so low that he could not understand what was being discussed during the council meetings. Three council members, including Ki, had spoken against Chan for making a high-profiled claim that he was the only candidate, whereas in fact the revelations were made only after a highly placed source leaked the fact to Wen Wei Po.

Education professor Li Hui said that Fung was "too young" to understand what is fair. Pro-Beijing legislator Christopher Chung called for Fung to be removed. Fung responded to criticism by stating that upholding institutional transparency is more important than the confidentiality rules. William Cheung, president of the HKU Academic Staff Association, stated that he was "proud of Fung for speaking up for righteousness".

=== Audio recordings leaked ===
A recording of the proceedings was obtained by Commercial Radio Hong Kong, which then broadcast excerpts of the discussions in late October featuring Arthur Li and Leonie Ki that confirmed the relevant parts of Billy Fung's accounts. The university, citing breach of confidentiality, sought and obtained an interim court order banning the radio station and "persons unknown" from publishing material from the confidential meetings; council chairman Edward Leong said the court order was sought to "protect the dignity of HKU." The council, which had voted to suspend Fung from future meetings, authorised the hiring of a security professional in an attempt to identify the source of the audio, and also brought in the police to investigate whether a crime had been committed. Prominent lawyers, however, said that no crime had been committed, and that any attempt to prosecute the leaker would fail. One senior legal academic criticised the council for wasting police resources.

Commercial Radio (CR) reached an agreement with HKU on 5 November undertaking not to air any other content of the council's past or future meetings unless these had already been reported by other media, meaning compliance with the terms of the interim injunction obtained by the university a few days earlier. The presiding High Court judge expressed reservations that Leong, on behalf of HKU, was seeking a "perpetual injunction on all meetings, future, past, and present". While CR's lawyer said agreement to comply with the court order did not imply that the station is compromising on press freedom, Hong Kong Journalists Association expressed disappointment at the broadcaster's decision. Pundits suggested that CR was bowing to political pressure as its broadcasting licence was up for renewal next year. The university insisted that the radio broadcaster must disclose the source of the leaked recording, which CR vowed it would never do, while a legal expert noted that privacy was not on equal footing with the freedom of information, and that legislation protecting whistleblowers was lacking in Hong Kong. At a court hearing on 6 November, the court extended the injunction to 24 November, but reduced its scope. It covers "persons unknown" who possess information about the five HKU council meetings held between June and October only. While HKU sought to adjourn the case, other interested parties – a legislator the HK Journalists Association, Apple Daily, and two HKU law student (one of whom being chief editor of HKU student magazine Undergrad) – joined the case seeking to have it dismissed outright. The blanket protection for future council meetings no longer applied.

A sound recording apparently featuring the speech of Rosanna Wong against Chan at the council meeting was posted to a discussion forum in Taiwan on 8 November. The poster said that the despite the cordial tones of the meeting between Taiwanese president Ma Ying-jeou and CCP general secretary Xi Jinping, this episode ought to serve as a reminder to all Taiwan people that what is happening in Hong Kong could easily happen to Taiwan. Wong, who was university classmates with Chan at the London School of Economics, urged the council to avoid the potential controversy and not to appoint Chan because of his "strong political position" and fears that "he probably would further divide". Billy Fung confirmed that the leaked recording was consistent with his recollection and with the notes he took during the meeting.

== Reaction ==
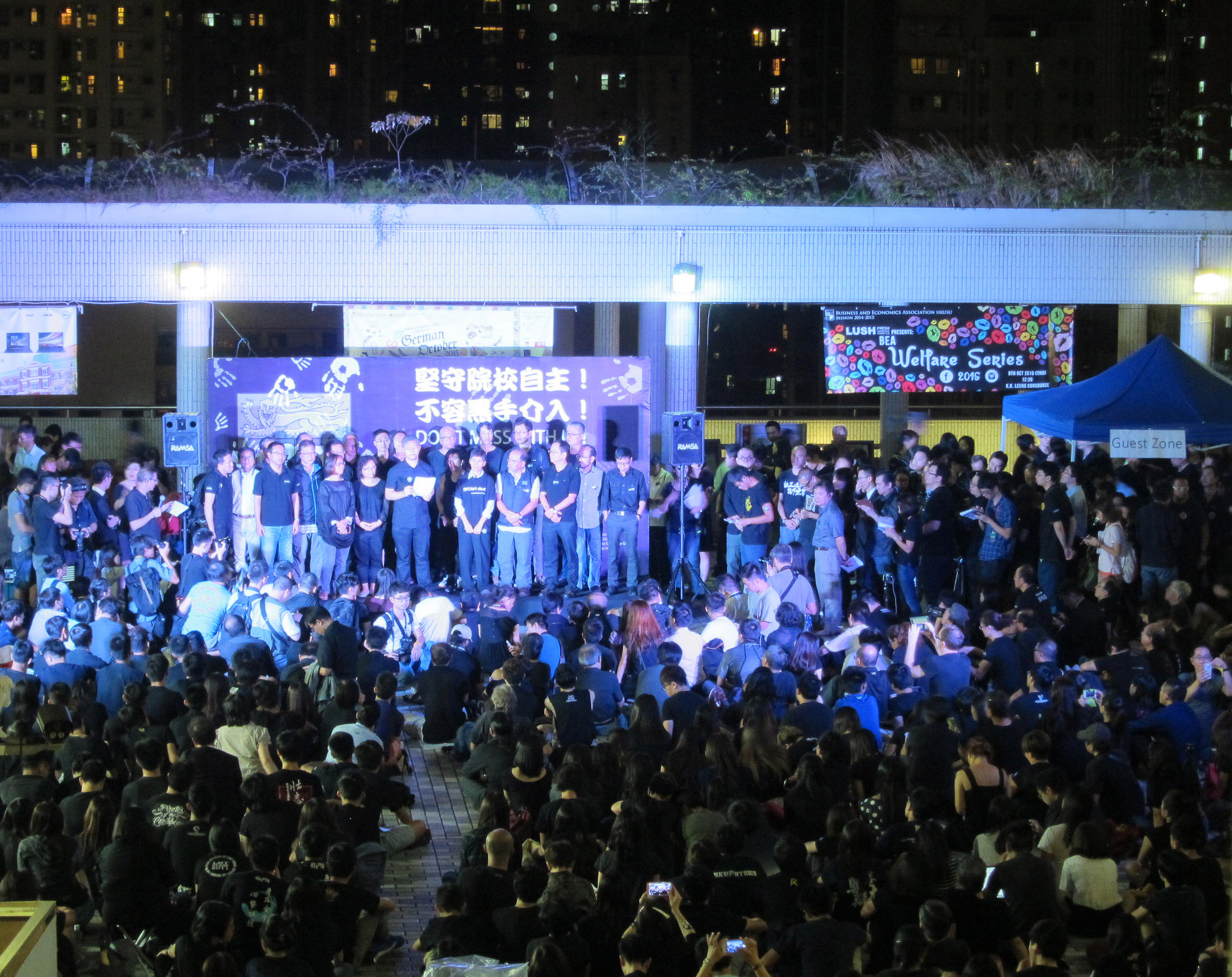
Students and faculty convene at Sun Yat-sen Place on the evening of 9 October

After the decision, Johannes Chan said that as a statutory publicly funded body, the council should act in an open and transparent manner and confirmed that he thought that his rejection was politically motivated. He stated, "This is not an issue of personal gain or loss, but one about the core values of academic freedom and institutional autonomy."

=== Students and scholars ===
Other key international public law scholars came to Chan's defence. Yash Ghai stated that "as a long-serving member of HKU [...] it grieves me greatly to see the council turn to these nasty tricks to deny [Chan the job] in order to – one must assume – appease the Chinese government". Jerome A. Cohen compared the vote to a Mao-era political tactic and called the decision "very sad news for Hong Kong's autonomy and freedom". Roderick MacFarquhar called the vote an example of the Chinese government's push under Xi Jinping, current General Secretary of the Chinese Communist Party, to eradicate so-called Western values.

The Hong Kong University Students' Union called the decision unjust and unfair, and demanded an explanation from the council members who voted against Chan's appointment. The Hong Kong Federation of Students stated that "the Hong Kong Communist administration has brazenly invaded Hong Kong's higher education, [and] political suppression of academia is now a fact". Education lawmaker Ip Kin-yuen said "It's obvious that the decision was a political one [...] Academic freedom will no longer exist after this" and "Today is the saddest day in the University of Hong Kong's 100 years of history." Others noted that the decision would serve as a warning to other academics not to engage in pro-democratic politics, and would severely tarnish Hong Kong's reputation for academic freedom and educational excellence.

The law faculty released a rare statement defending Chan against the council members who said he was not suitable for the post. The statement said that the accusations levelled against Chan were groundless, and that "[The faculty] refutes in the strongest possible terms unfair criticisms that were said to have been made [...] Chan is internationally recognised as a leading scholar in his field. He was appointed dean of law for his vision, his leadership, his integrity, his passion for legal education, and above all his outstanding abilities. We have been fortunate to have him at the helm of the faculty."

On 8 October 2015, academics from across Hong Kong's tertiary education sector convened to form a new group to defend academic freedom called Scholars' Alliance for Academic Freedom (SAAF). The group stated, "academic freedom can only exist through perpetual awareness, insistence and collective work".

In elections to elect three full-time teaching members of its governing Council to replace those retiring in December, Head of the School of Humanities Timothy O'Leary, politics professor Joseph Chan and Mechanical engineering professor Cheung Kie-chung topped the poll with 322, 328 and 183 votes respectively. All three said they opposed the appointment of Arthur Li to chair the council.

=== Doctorate degree issue ===
Numerous academics have rebuked the repeated attacks in pro-government media against Chan's lack of a doctorate degree, a point that Billy Fung says was cited by Arthur Li and Edward Chen as a primary reason for not appointing Chan. Joseph Lian Yizheng, prominent former member of the Central Policy Unit, noted that no incumbent law school dean in Hong Kong has a doctoral degree, nor do numerous deans of top international law schools. He wrote that such a requirement is "irrelevant" in the law profession, and alleged that many of those on the HKU council who head academic departments yet do not hold PhDs were being hypocritical. Sing Ming, a professor at the Hong Kong University of Science and Technology, echoed the observation that a lack of a PhD is not unusual among heads of law schools internationally. Chinese University international relations professor Simon Shen wrote that it was "ridiculous" to require a doctoral degree for the post, citing the case of celebrated Chinese historian and educator Ch'ien Mu, who had only a junior high education. Ming Pao Daily noted that only four out of six current or former Hong Kong pro-vice-chancellors since 2013 hold doctorate degrees. Chan himself says that he began study for a doctoral degree in 1988 at the London School of Economics, but dropped out because he wanted to help Hong Kong people understand legal issues during the complicated run-up to the 1997 transfer of sovereignty over Hong Kong.

=== Demonstrations ===
On 6 October 2015, up to 2,000 faculty and students donned black dress and held a walkout, marching in silent protest through the university campus. Banners appeared around the campus reading, "The institutional autonomy of the University of Hong Kong is under attack." Speaking at the protest Timothy O'Leary, head of the Humanities Department, described Chan's non-appointment as "an absolute disgrace", and said "we march in silence to demonstrate to ourselves and to the city of Hong Kong what a university could be like if its academic staff and students were silent."

A second protest took place at 9 October 2015 at Sun Yat-sen Place, outside the university library. It was co-organised by the Students' Union, the HKU Academic Staff Association, the HKU Alumni Concern Group, and 18 professional institutes representing lawyers, accountants, surveyors, information technology workers, nurses, social workers, psychologists, and other professions. The organisers called the council's decision "unprecedented and naked political interference" in university affairs and said that it undermines "Hong Kong values" in demonstrating that hard work and competence may be worthless if you have political views deemed unacceptable by the establishment.

=== US Congress ===
The US-China Economic and Security Review Commission published its annual report in mid-November drawing attention to declining press and academic freedom in Hong Kong. It specifically mentioned the controversy surrounding the appointment of Chan to pro-vice-chancellor of the university.

The HK government retorted that Hong Kong enjoyed a high degree of autonomy under one country, two systems enshrined in the Basic Law, adding that the eight "University Grants Committee-funded institutions were all independent and autonomous statutory bodies". The government warned foreign governments and legislatures that they "should not interfere in any form in Hong Kong's internal affairs".

== See also ==
- Moral and national education
- Scholarism
