= CQVIP =

Chinese online database

CQVIP (also known as VIP Chinese Journal Database; Chinese: 维普中文期刊数据库) is a major Chinese academic database developed and managed by Chongqing VIP Information Co., Ltd. It is one of the three largest academic journal databases in China, alongside China National Knowledge Infrastructure (CNKI) and Wanfang Data.

== Overview ==
Founded in 1989 and headquartered in Chongqing, China, CQVIP provides access to a wide range of Chinese academic resources, including journals, conference proceedings, dissertations, standards, patents, and reference works. The database primarily serves researchers, librarians, and academic institutions in China and abroad who seek access to Chinese-language scholarly publications.

== Coverage and access ==
As of the 2020s, CQVIP indexes more than 15,000 Chinese academic journals across disciplines. The database offers both bibliographic information and full-text access (depending on institutional subscription). Its platform supports keyword, title, and author searches in both simplified and traditional Chinese.

CQVIP operates on a subscription-based model, with institutional access available to universities, research institutes, and libraries. Individual users may also purchase single articles. The interface is accessible via the VIP Chinese Journal Service Platform (维普网), located at www.cqvip.com.

== Relationship to other databases ==
Within China's digital academic publishing landscape, CQVIP is often considered complementary to CNKI and Wanfang Data, though the three compete for institutional users. CQVIP distinguishes itself by offering more coverage of regional and specialized journals, particularly from western China, as well as a more flexible article-purchase model.

== See also ==
- CNKI
- Wanfang Data
- Academic publishing in China
