= Lawrence Lau =

American economist

- 劉遵義
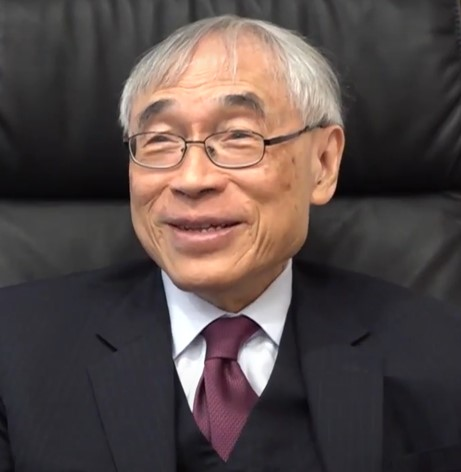
- Lau interviewed by the China News Service in September 2019.

Non-official Member of the Executive Council of Hong Kong
- In office 21 January 2009 – 30 June 2012
- President: Sir Donald Tsang
- Convenor: Ronald Arculli

Vice Chancellor of the Chinese University of Hong Kong
- In office 1 July 2004 – 30 June 2010
- Chancellor: Tung Chee-hwa; Sir Donald Tsang
- Preceded by: Ambrose King
- Succeeded by: Joseph Sung

Personal details
- Born: 12 December 1944 (age 81) Zunyi, China
- Spouse: Ayesha Abbas Macpherson
- Education: St. Paul's Co-educational College
- Alma mater: Stanford University (BS); University of California, Berkeley (MA, PhD)

Lawrence Lau
- Traditional Chinese: 劉遵義
- Simplified Chinese: 刘遵义
Transcriptions
Standard Mandarin
- Hanyu Pinyin: Liú Zūnyì
Yue: Cantonese
- Jyutping: lau4 zeon1 ji6

Lawrence Lau Juen-yee, GBS, JP (Chinese: 劉遵義; born 12 December 1944) is a Hong Kong economist and the former Chancellor of the Chinese University of Hong Kong. He was a non-official member of the Executive Council of Hong Kong from 2009 to 2012. Before joining CUHK he was an economics professor at Stanford University.

== Personal life ==
Lau was born on 12 December 1944 in Zunyi, Guizhou, Republic of China. His maternal grandfather was famed calligrapher and Kuomintang leader Yu Youren of Shaanxi Province. He received his secondary education from St. Paul's Co-educational College in Hong Kong, then attended college in the United States. He received a B.S. in physics and economics with high honors from Stanford University in 1964 and an M.A. and a Ph.D. from the University of California, Berkeley, in economics in 1966 and 1969, respectively. He joined the faculty of the Department of Economics of Stanford University in 1966 and was promoted to Professor of Economics in 1976.

== Academic career ==
In 1992, Lau was named the first Kwoh-Ting Li Professor of Economic Development at Stanford University. From 1992 to 1996, he served as a co-director of the Asia-Pacific Research Center of Stanford University. From 1997 to 1999, he served as the director of the Stanford Institute for Economic Policy Research (SIEPR) of Stanford University. His specialized fields are Economic Development, Economic Growth, and the Economies of East Asia, including China. He developed one of the first econometric models of China in 1966, and has continued to revise and update his model since then.

Lau has been elected a member of Phi Beta Kappa, a member of Tau Beta Pi, a Fellow of the Econometric Society, an Academician of Academia Sinica, a Member of the Conference for Research in Income and Wealth, an Overseas Fellow of Churchill College, Cambridge, England, an Honorary Member of the Chinese Academy of Social Sciences and an Academician of the International Eurasian Academy of Sciences. He has been awarded the degree of Doctor of Social Sciences, honoris causa, by the Hong Kong University of Science and Technology. He has been a John Simon Guggenheim Memorial Foundation Fellow and a Fellow of the Center for Advanced Study in the Behavioral Sciences. He is the author or editor of five books and more than one hundred and sixty articles and notes in professional publications.

Lau is active in both academic and professional services. He is an Honorary Research Fellow of the Shanghai Academy of Social Sciences, Shanghai; an Honorary Professor of the Institute of Systems Science, Chinese Academy of Sciences, Jilin University, Nanjing University, Renmin University, Shantou University, Southeast University, and the School of Economics and Management, Tsinghua University, Beijing; an International Adviser, National Bureau of Statistics, People's Republic of China and a member of the board of directors of the Chiang Ching-kuo Foundation for International Scholarly Exchange, Taipei.

He moved back to Hong Kong in 2004 to take up the position of Vice-Chancellor of the Chinese University of Hong Kong.

Lau is currently the Ralph and Claire Landau Professor of Economics, the Chinese University of Hong Kong.

In 2015, Lau suggested that students who stormed the University of Hong Kong council meeting should be imprisoned.

== 2019–20 Hong Kong protests ==
In 2019, Lau criticised Hong Kong protests. He wrote: "To find a way forward, one must recognise that the current disturbances reflect deep-rooted, but until now largely latent, anger and discontent among lower-income groups in Hong Kong, especially younger people. The discontent and perceived lack of hope provided the environment for domestic and foreign agitators to succeed."

== Other activities ==
In January 2009, Lau was named a non-official member of the Executive Council of Hong Kong by Chief Executive Donald Tsang. He renounced his United States citizenship to take up the position. Later that year, he became a member of the International Advisory Council of the Chinese sovereign wealth fund China Investment Corporation.

Academic offices
Preceded by Ambrose King	Vice-Chancellor of the Chinese University of Hong Kong; 2004 – 2010	Succeeded by Joseph Sung
Order of precedence
Preceded by Eva Cheng; Recipients of the Gold Bauhinia Star	Hong Kong order of precedence Recipients of the Gold Bauhinia Star	Succeeded by Christina Ting; Recipients of the Gold Bauhinia Star
