= Cheng Kung Senior High School =

Senior high school in Taipei, Taiwan

Coordinates: 25°02′34″N 121°31′25″E

Cheng Kung Senior High School logo

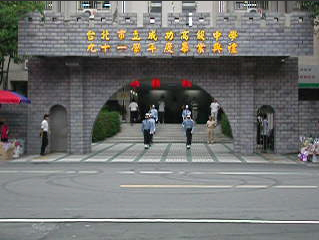
Cheng Kung Senior High School in 2003

Taipei Municipal Chenggong High School (Chinese: 臺北市立成功高级中學, CGHS in Hanyu Pinyin, originally CKSH in Wade-Giles, Taipei Municipal Cheng Kung Senior High School) is a senior high school in Zhongzheng District, Taipei, Taiwan. Their motto is "education is the betterment of our society", as stated on their website.

== History ==
Founded in 1922, the school was formerly called the Taihoku (Taipei during Japanese rule) Prefectural Second Middle School and then briefly called Taihoku Second Middle School. It moved from the Bodhidharma temple to the present site in 1925, and was intended for the enrollment of Taiwanese students, as all the "first" middle schools were reserved for the Japanese except for Taichung First Middle School (which was founded by a group of local elites in Taichung).

In 1946, the following year of the Allies victory over Japan in World War II and restoration of Taiwan to the Republic of China, the school was renamed the Taiwan Provincial Taipei Cheng Kung High School in memory of the national hero, Koxinga (Cheng Cheng-kung) for his resistance to foreign invaders. In 1955, the school was ordered to disperse and set up a branch school in Taoyuan, which was later expanded into "the Joint Taoyuan Branch School of the Five Provincial Taipei High School." It became independent and was renamed the Taiwan Provincial Wu-Ling High School in 1959.

In the autumn of 1967, Taipei City came under control of the Executive Yuan. The school was given the name Taipei Municipal Cheng Kung Senior High School. The present name of the school is Taipei Municipal Chenggong High School.

By order of the government, the school began to have evening sessions in 1953, which stopped enrolling new students in 1981. The evening sessions terminated two years later after the final students in the programme graduated.

== Notable alumni ==
- Hau Lung-bin – Mayor of Taipei City (2006–2014)
- Ambrose King – sociologist
- Gu Long – Wuxia novel writer
- David Der-wei Wang – Professor of Chinese literature

== Transportation ==
The school is accessible within walking distance south of Shandao Temple Station of Taipei Metro.

== See also ==
- Education in Taiwan
