= Xu Guozhang =

Chinese educator (1915–1994)

Xu Guozhang (simplified Chinese: 许国璋; traditional Chinese: 許國璋; pinyin: Xǔ Guózhāng; 1915 – 1994), male, former professor of Beijing Foreign Studies University, was a linguist and educator who made outstanding contributions to China's foreign language education. The university English textbook edited by him, also called Xu Guozhang English, was a best-seller nationwide for over 30 years.

== Biography ==
Born on November 25, 1915 in Haining City, Zhejiang Province of China, boy Xu Guozhang was admitted to Jiaxing Xiuzhou Middle School in 1927. In 1934, he graduated from Soochow University Affiliated Middle School (now one of the predecessors of Suzhou Middle School) with the first place in the school. Later, he was admitted to Shanghai Jiaotong University, majoring in management. In September 1936, Xu transferred to Tsinghua University and studied in the Foreign Languages Department as a sophomore. After the outbreak of the Second Sino-Japanese War, he transferred to Southwest Associated University and studied under William Empson and Qian Zhongshu respectively. He graduated from the University in 1939 and later taught at Shanghai Jiaotong University and Fudan University. In 1947, Xu went to UK and studied at the University of London and University of Oxford, majoring in British literature of the 17th and 18th centuries. In October 1949, Xu returned to China and taught at Beijing Foreign Studies University. In 1963, he published Xu Guozhang English, which became a classic textbook for English teaching in China in the following decades.

During the Cultural Revolution, Xu was criticized. After being rehabilitated, Xu served as director of the Foreign Languages Research Institute of Beijing Foreign Studies University. He was also professor and head of the department of English, editor in chief of the journal of Foreign Language Teaching and Research, president of the China English Teaching Research Association and deputy chief editor of Encyclopedia of China, editing the linguistics section. He also wrote the book Xu Guozhang on Language. In addition to traditional linguistics, Xu also made substantial contribution to the philosophy of language, foreign literature, translation and cultural studies.

On September 11, 1994, Xu died of myocardial infarction at his home in Beijing.

== Xu Guozhang English ==
This is a set of university textbooks edited by Xu Guozhang, originally entitled "English", also called "Xu Guozhang English" or "Xu Guozhang's English". They were first published by the Commercial Press in 1963, and soon became a best-seller nationwide for over 30 years. There are eight volumes. Xu Guozhang served as the chief editor and was responsible for editing books 1 to 4, while Yu Dawei was responsible for books 5 and 6, and Xu Yanmou for books 7 and 8.

In the 1980s and even the early 1990s, although Xu Guozhang's English had some political imprints of the 1960s, it was still widely used in colleges and universities across the country due to its strong practicality and scientific nature. It is not only an excellent professional English textbook, but also a reading book for ordinary people to learn English by themselves.

Since the publication of the "English" textbooks (book 1 ~ book 8) to the new editions entitled "Xu Guozhang English" and "New Xu Guozhang English" published by the Foreign Language Teaching and Research Press in the 1990s, when it was most popular, almost every English learner in China had a copy.

In 2009, Xu Guozhang English was selected as one of the "600 Most Influential Books in China in the Past 60 Years" jointly organized by China Book Business News and China Publishing Science Research Institute.

== Foreign Language Teaching and Research ==
Foreign Language Teaching and Research, formerly edited by Xu Guozhang, is not only a top foreign language academic journal in China, but also of high reputation internationally.

== Statue ==
In November 2003, the unveiling ceremony of Xu Guozhang's bronze statue was held in the Foreign Language Research and Development Press Institute. The base of the bronze statue is engraved with: "Xu Guozhang (1915.11.25–1994.9.11), a linguist and educator who made outstanding contributions to China's foreign language education."
