= Beijing Foreign Studies University =

Public university in Beijing, China

Coordinates: 39°57′15″N 116°18′15″E

- 北京外国语大学
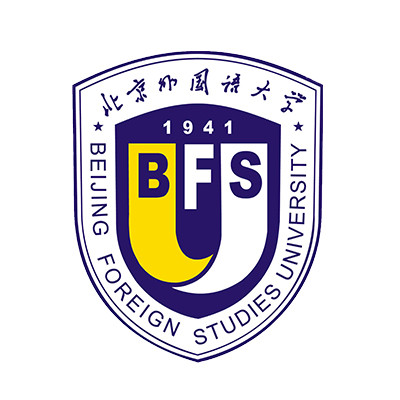
- Motto: 兼容并蓄 博学笃行
- Type: National
- Established: 1941; 85 years ago
- Affiliations: BHUA
- President: Yang Dan
- Faculty: 2,428
- Students: 8,579 (932 international students)
- Undergraduates: 5,088
- Postgraduates: 2,559
- Doctoral students: 440
- Location: Beijing, China
- Campus: Urban
- Website: global.bfsu.edu.cn/en/

Chinese name
- Simplified Chinese: 北京外国语大学
- Traditional Chinese: 北京外國語大學
Transcriptions
Standard Mandarin
- Hanyu Pinyin: Běijīng Wàiguóyǔ Dàxué

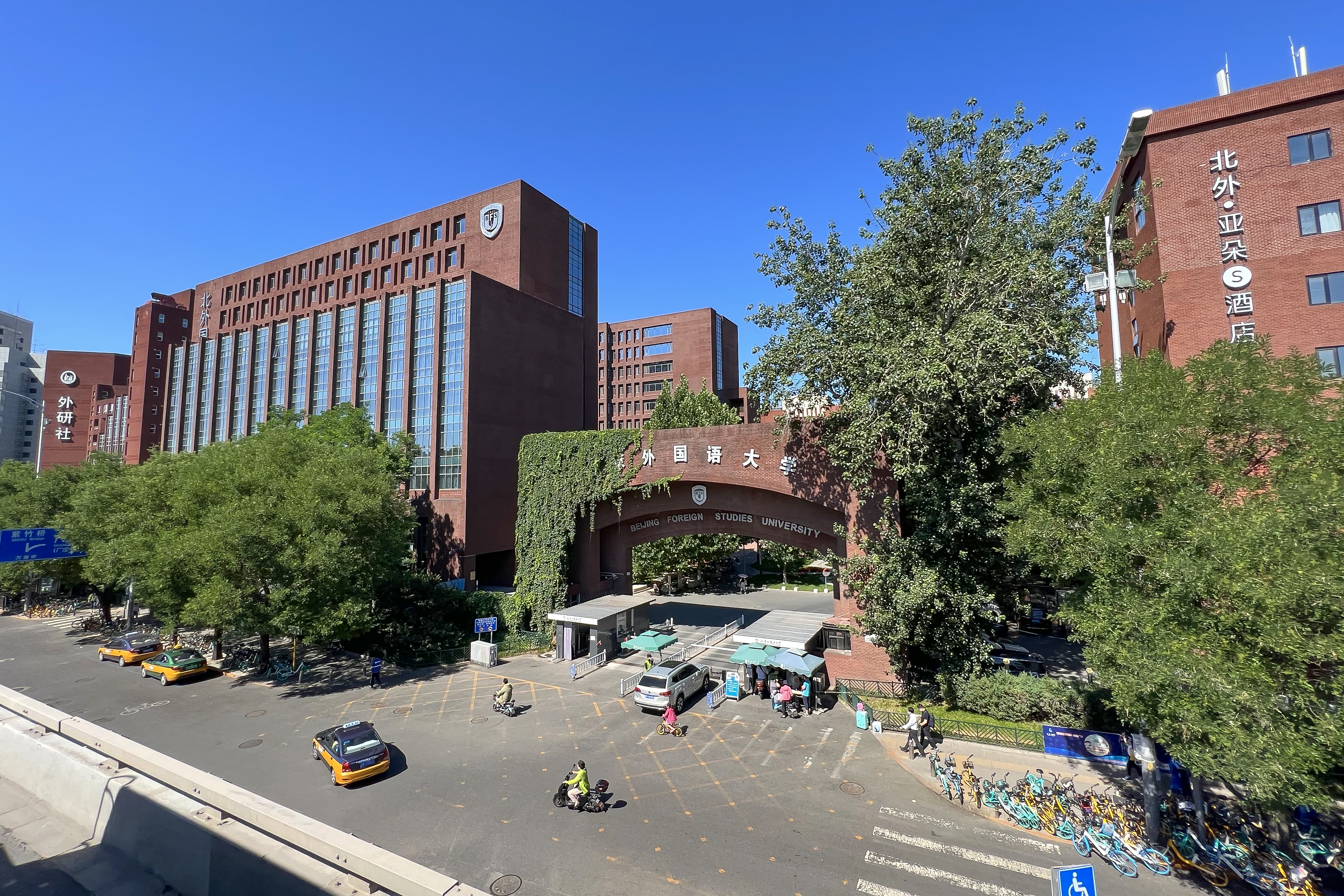
BFSU West Campus

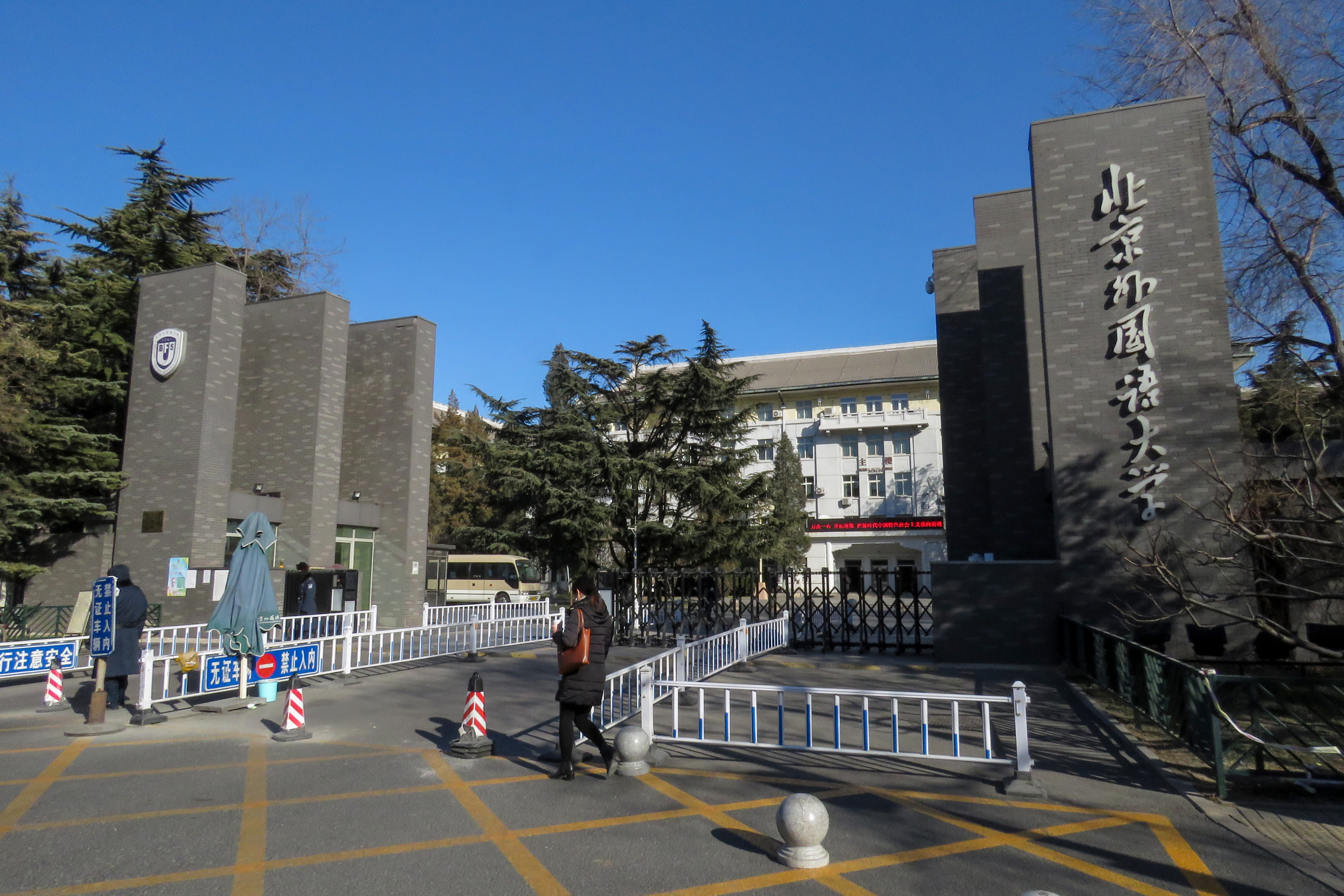
BFSU East Campus

Beijing Foreign Studies University (BFSU; 北京外国语大学) is a public university in Haidian, Beijing, China. It is affiliated with the Ministry of Education. The university is part of Project 211 and the Double First-Class Construction.

BFSU is a sister university of Peking University (PKU), with both institutions affiliated with the Education Working Committee in the Haidian District. Given their affiliation with the same committee, the two universities also maintain institutional and academic links, including the appointment of a former president of one university as president of the other, as well as cooperation in courses and degree programmes.

== History ==
BFSU was affiliated with the Ministry of Foreign Affairs from its establishment in 1941 to the early 1980s. During this period, the university primarily focused on training diplomats and foreign language specialists for China's foreign service. In the 1980s, BFSU expanded its academic offerings to include international studies and research. In December 2014, the Institute for Global History was founded to promote research on global interactions, and three years later, in December 2017, the School of History was established under Professor Li Xuetao to provide courses on world and Chinese history from a global perspective, emphasizing multilingual and cross-cultural research.

BFSU's motto, "Embrace diversity, pursue broad learning and earnest practice" (兼容并蓄，博学笃行), was proposed by Premier Wen Jiabao in a congratulatory letter for the university's 70th anniversary. It draws inspiration from Cai Yuanpei's idea of "freedom of thought and compatibility" during his presidency at Peking University, reflecting a global vision, openness to different cultures, and the integration of knowledge with practical action.

BFSU has trained generations of Chinese diplomats and civil servants. BFSU alumni are well known in the Ministry of Foreign Affairs and the Ministry of State Security.

== Rankings and reputation ==
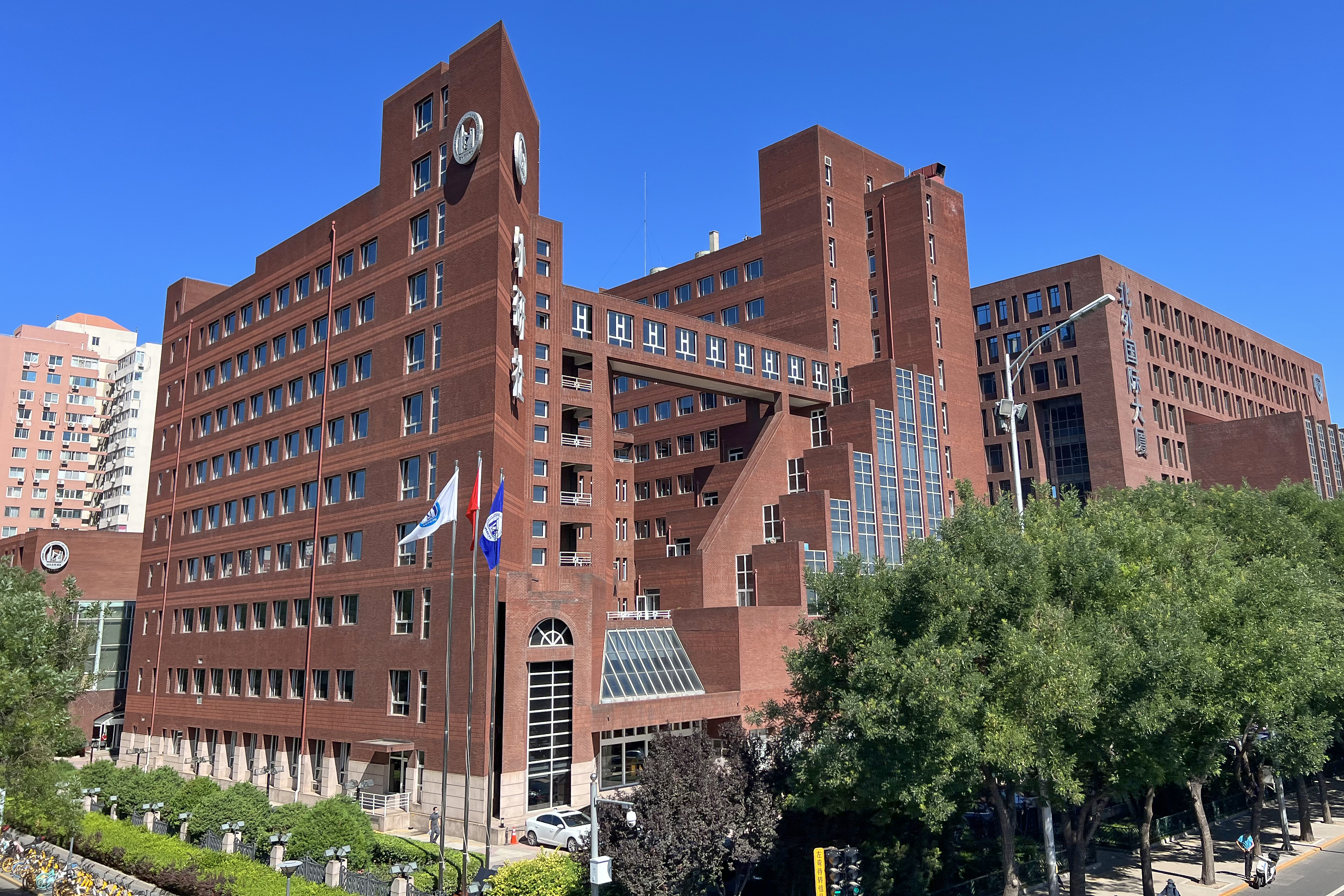
The Foreign Language Teaching and Research Press under BFSU

BFSU is a research university specializing in foreign language studies. It is considered one of the most prestigious in its field in the country. BFSU ranked 17th out of almost 3,000 higher education institutions in China according to statistics based on the Gaokao from 2012 to 2023.

Beijing Foreign Studies University ranked first among universities in China specializing in language studies and research in the recent edition of the Best Chinese Universities Ranking. The university consistently features in the top 100 international universities in linguistics as ranked by the QS World University Rankings by subjects. BFSU is also highly ranked by the world universities rankings in "Arts and Humanities", "Modern Languages", "English Language and Literature" and "Education".

The International Business School of Beijing Foreign Studies University is accredited from the Association to Advance Collegiate Schools of Business.

== Rivalry ==
The university has produced an array of senior diplomatic officials and proudly claims itself as "the cradle of PRC diplomats". However, having trained hundreds of Chinese ambassadors, China Foreign Affairs University (CFAU) also considers itself "the cradle of Chinese diplomats". Rivalry between students of the two universities continues to the present day.

== Notable people ==
- Xu Guozhang, linguist and educator
- He Jiong, television host
- Yang Lan, co-founder and chairperson of Sun Media Group
- Jin Liqun, president of the Asian Infrastructure Investment Bank
- Hao Ping, president of Peking University and former president of BFSU
- Cui Tiankai, longest serving Chinese ambassador to the United States
- Tae Yong-ho, member of the South Korean National Assembly and former deputy North Korean ambassador to the United Kingdom.
- Hu Xijin, former editor-in-chief of Global Times
- Gao Xingjian, novelist who was awarded the Nobel Prize in Literature

== See also ==
- Eurasian Humanities Studies
- Foreign Language Teaching and Research Press
