= CNKI =

Publishing company in China

CNKI China National Knowledge Infrastructure
- Website type: Digital publishing; Private
- Available in: Chinese, English
- Headquarters: Beijing
- Owners: Tongfang Knowledge Network Technology Co., Ltd.
- Website: oversea.cnki.net cnki.net
- Commercial: Yes
- Launched: 1996; 30 years ago
- Current status: Active

CNKI (China National Knowledge Infrastructure; Chinese: 中国知网) is a knowledge infrastructure project in China, directly led by Tsinghua University and has received support from multiple state ministries. It is the largest full-text academic information platform in China, which operates databases of academic journals, conference proceedings, newspapers, reference works, and patent documents, and holds a dominant position in the country's academic information market.

CNKI maintains monopoly status on journal search and collection in China and charges high annual database subscription fees. Its subscription fee increases every year. Multiple Chinese universities and research institutions, including the Chinese Academy of Sciences and Peking University, stopped subscribing to CNKI. CNKI was fined CNY 87.6 million for monopoly by the State Administration for Market Regulation in 2022, and fined CNY 50 million for illegal gathering of personal information by the Cyberspace Administration of China in 2023.

== History and operation ==
The predecessor of CNKI, China Academic Journals CD-ROM (CAJ-CD), was launched in January 1997 as China's first academic journal search system that publishes regularly. It included 3,500 Chinese journals in the fields of sciences, engineering, humanities, and social science.

Published by a unit under Tsinghua University and created with the permission of the National Press and Publication Administration, the database was released as CD-ROMs, with each containing journals of a field. A disc was released monthly, except the volume on the arts, history, and philosophy, which was released every two months. In 1999, the database could also be accessed on the web. It allowed users to comment, search, and inquire about academic works.

In August 1997, the China Academic Journals Electronic Publishing House (CAJEPH) was established under the governance of the National Press and Publication Administration. The operation was run by Tsinghua University.

CNKI owns a system called "China Integrated Knowledge Resources System," including journals, doctoral dissertations, masters' theses, proceedings, newspapers, yearbooks, statistical yearbooks, e-books, patents and standards. In 2013, CNKI became the second DOI registration agency in mainland China, after the Institute of Scientific and Technical Information of China under the Ministry of Science and Technology.

== Government investigations ==
By 2022, CNKI has been criticized for its high subscription fees that could be maintained because of its monopoly over journal search and collection service in China. Prominent Chinese universities and research institutions, including Peking University and the state-owned Chinese Academy of Sciences, have stopped subscribing to CNKI because of the fees.

The public controversy was followed by a Chinese government investigation for anti-competitive practices. In May 2022, the State Administration for Market Regulation launched an investigation into CNKI. The regulator said that since 2014, CNKI had violated anti-competition laws by raising prices repeatedly and splitting its database into smaller ones while keeping the price (see shrinkflation). The regulator also found that CNKI's operator use exclusivity clauses to prohibit tertiary institutions from granting publishing rights of articles and theses to third parties. In December, CNKI's operator was fined 87.6 million Chinese yuan (US$12.6 million), or 5 percent of its sales in China in 2021, and asked to cancel its exclusive agreements.

In June 2022, the Cyberspace Administration of China announced a cybersecurity review on CNKI "to prevent national data security risks, safeguard national security, and protect public interests". CNKI was fined 50 million Chinese yuan (US$6.84 million) for not disclosing the terms of personal information collection, allowing account deletion, and removing personal information after an account is deleted.

== Foreign access ==
In March 2023, CNKI said that it will terminate access for universities and research institutions outside of mainland China. However, the British Library and some universities in Australia, Hong Kong, Italy, Malaysia, Macau, Singapore, the United Kingdom, and the United States can still access CNKI through their university library portals.

== See also ==
- Wanfang Data
- CQVIP
- Academic publishing in China
