= Foreign Language Teaching and Research Press =

Foreign Language Teaching and Research Press 外语教学与研究出版社
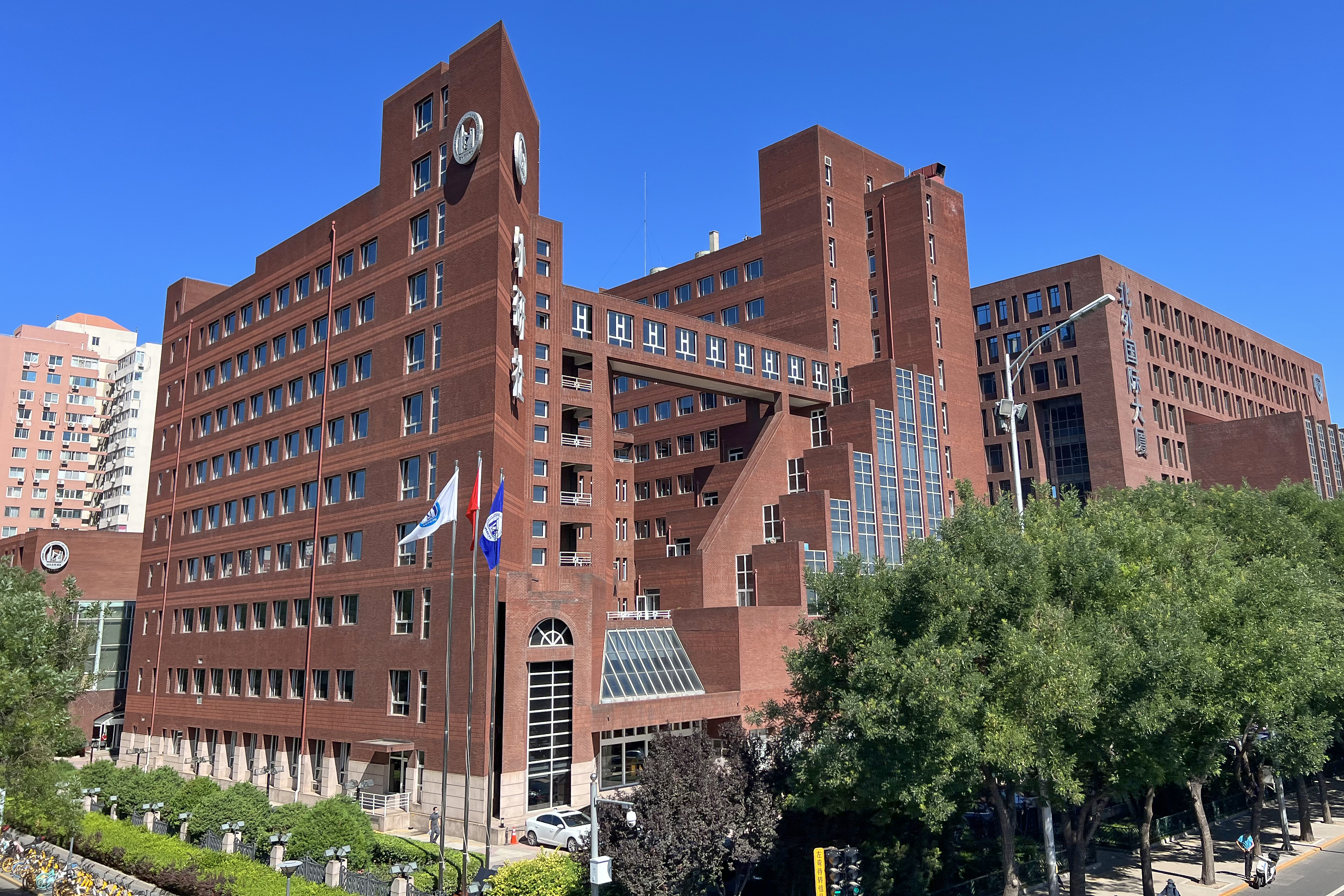
- Founded: 28 August 1979; 47 years ago
- Country of origin: China
- Owner: Beijing Foreign Studies University
- Official website: www.fltrp.com/en/

Foreign Language Teaching and Research Press (Chinese: 外语教学与研究出版社, FLTRP), is a foreign language publishing house affiliated with Beijing Foreign Studies University. It was established in 1979. In 2010, it was restructured into a co., ltd.

== Overview ==
FLTRP has 10 branches and 12 independent legal entities. FLTRP also has a subsidiary brand of Beijing Foreign Language Audiovisual Publishing House (北京外语音像出版社), which is used to publish audiovisual products supplementing FLTRP books.

FLTRP is the largest foreign language and university press in China. FLTRP started as a language education publisher and has expanded into more subjects and areas. FLTRP provides offline and online training services for both teachers and students, and organizes many conferences and competitions. FLTRP publishes in nearly 80 languages, and has over 600 international partners.

== See also ==
- Foreign Languages Press
- Beijing Foreign Studies University
- Shanghai Foreign Language Education Press
