= Doron Mendels =

Israeli historian

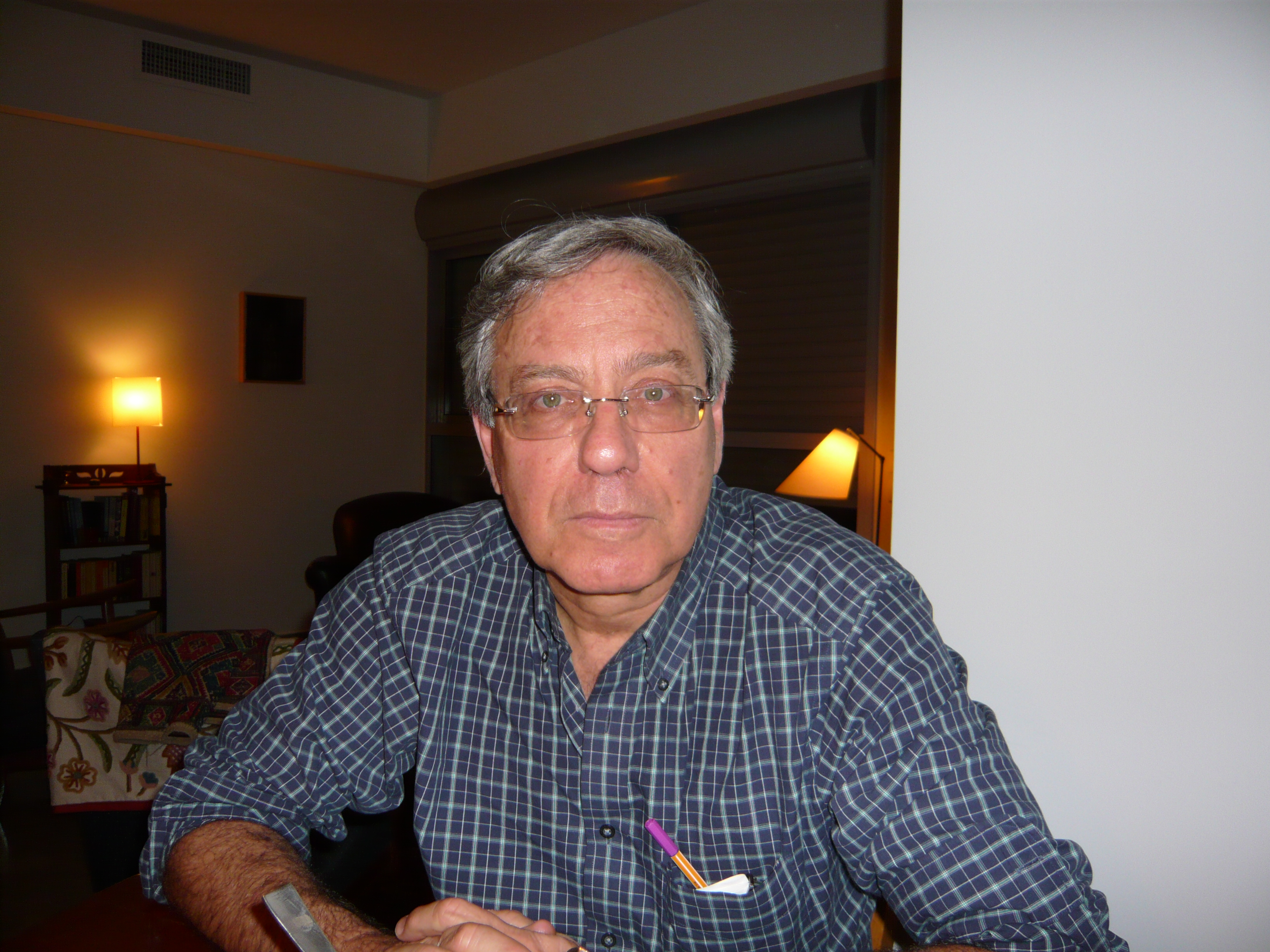

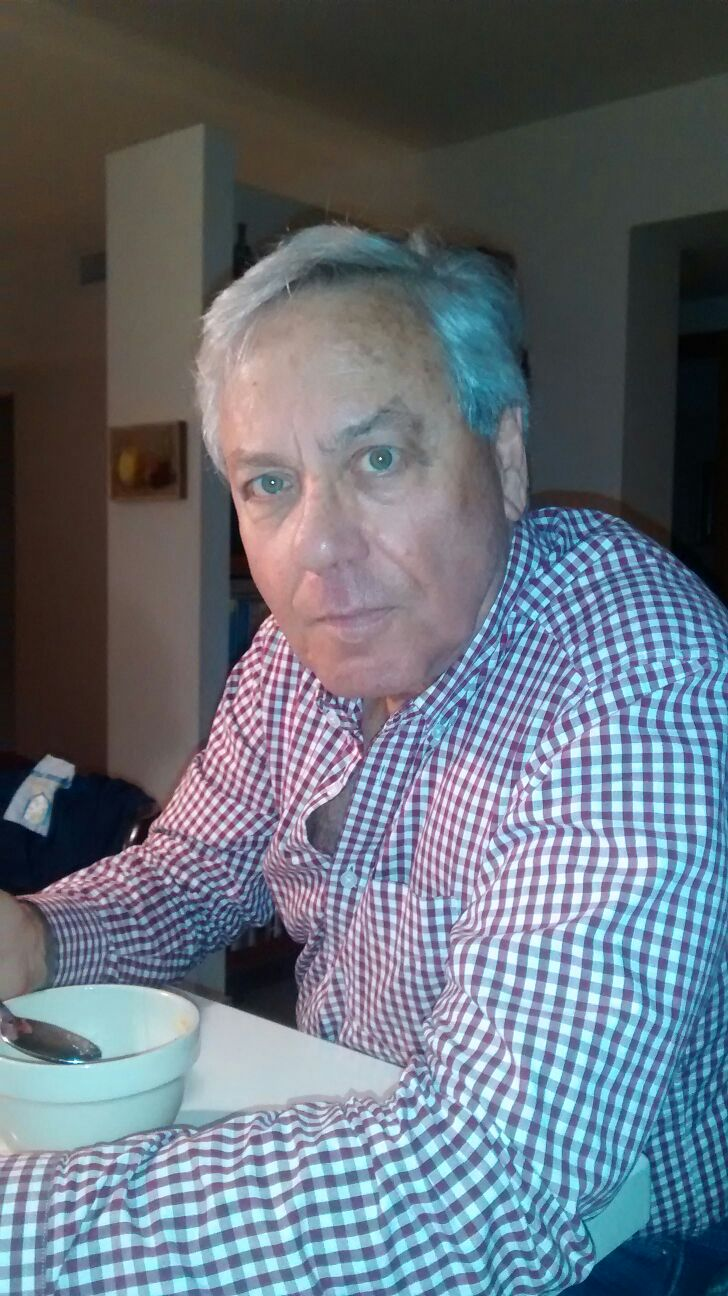

Doron Mendels (Hebrew: דורון מנדלס) is a full professor in the history department of the Hebrew University in Jerusalem.

== Research ==
Mendel's research primarily covers the Hellenistic world from various perspectives (beginning with the period of Alexander the Great in the 4th century BCE through the period of Constantine the Great in the 4th century CE). Many of his works deal with the encounters between the Jews, Christianity, and Paganism, and relate to the themes of historiography, ancient Jewish nationalism, the history of the Catholic Church, public memory, and communication.

=== Books ===
==== The Land of Israel as a Political Concept in Hasmonean Literature ====
This work was Mendel's first published book, issued in 1987 in Germany by Mohr-Siebeck, Tuebingen, Germany. The book deals with the pseudepigrapha, apocrypha and Jewish Hellenistic literature of the Hasmonean era, works which have not usually been seen in their historical-political context. Mendels deals with the perception of the Land of Israel in the Hasmonean period, and reveals that the question of borders was an open question which was dealt with differently in each decade of the 2nd century BCE.

==== The Rise and Fall of Jewish Nationalism: Jewish and Christian Ethnicity in Ancient Palestine ====
This book by Mendels, dealing with Jewish nationalism, resonated in the scholarly world beyond ancient historians. It was first published in 1992 by Doubleday in New York, and in paperback in 1997 by William B. Eerdmans in Grand Rapids, Michigan. The book shows the development of the Jewish approach to nationalism in the Jewish community of Palestine in the ancient period. Mendels divides the concept of nationalism into 4 components that shaped nationalism in the ancient period, each one receiving a separate history from the period of the Maccabees until the Bar Kochba revolt. The 4 elements are:

1. Territory,
2. Leadership – generally kingship,
3. Army, and
4. Temple – conducted by the priests.

Mendels concludes that this approach to nationalism was authentically Jewish, although elements of it can be found also in the surrounding pagan world. This book is cited inter alia by modern historians who deal with nationalism.

==== Jewish Identity in the Hellenistic Period ====
The book deals with the question of Jewish identity based on the literature of the period. It was published in Hebrew by the Broadcast University in 1996, based on a series of lectures on Galei Tzahal.

==== Identity, Religion, and Historiography: Studies in Hellenistic History ====
This book is a collection of articles written by Mendels up to 1997. It was published by Sheffield Academic Press in 1998. Some of the studies deal with the noted Hellenistic historian Polybius. A number of articles deal with the encounters between the Jews and the Hellenistic world. Mendels dedicated a significant portion of his research to the literature of the period, from the Greek translation of the Bible through the Pseudepigraphic and apocryphal literature to the New Testament. The literature of Qumran is also dealt with in this collection.

One article deals with the Essenes, comparing the light of their lives with what we know about the Hellenistic utopia, which came into style after the conquests of Alexander the Great.

Another article deals with the issue of the reception of historians from the ancient period during the Byzantine period. The article focuses on the Bibliotheca of the 9th-century patriarch Photius of Byzantium.

In another article, Mendels defines the concept "creative history". He distinguishes between the rationalist historiographic writings (historians that deal with cause and effect, writing linear narratives that describe the history of a period month by month and year by year) and historiography that enhances the connections between political and social needs by tying them to different social strands in the population (primarily from the Hellenistic world after the conquests of Alexander the Great). In reality, Mendels deals here with the question of how history is "fabricated" in order to create identity in a changing world.

In his comprehensive article on Manetho, the Egyptian priest, Mendels also discusses this question with a focus on Egyptian Hellenism.

In another article, Mendels examines the question of how Paul and the first Apostles accepted the idea of mission. The concept of mission did not exist in the Judaism that preceded them, and Mendels demonstrates that the ancient Christian mission derived from the concept of mission relating to the traveling Hellenistic gods. This borrowing had a significant impact on the notion of conversion to the new religion.

==== The Media Revolution of Early Christianity: An Essay on Eusebius's Ecclesiastical History ====
This book by Mendels was published in 1999 in Grand Rapids Michigan (William B. Eerdmans). In it, he attempts to examine the question of how the Church, which developed as an esoteric entity in the Land of Israel, became in less than 300 years a state religion that encompassed the world. Utilizing subsidiary research from the field of communications (social science), Mendels demonstrates that the church intensively utilized tools of communication to spread its message throughout the ancient world. As a textual basis for his research, Mendels uses Eusebius, a noted church father from the end of the 3rd century and the beginning of the 4th century CE, who was a bishop in Caesarea in the Land of Israel. Mendels primarily utilizes Eusebius's book, the Church History (while at times relying on his other works such as The Preparation for the Gospel), to demonstrate that we are dealing with a real communication revolution. This book integrates ancient historiographic research with modern research in communication. The communication tools that helped the Church spread out and become a significant organization within the Roman Empire (and later even beyond it) are primarily the following: Christian martyrdom which took place in the public space during particular periods, became a very valuable communication asset. The confrontation between Christian Orthodoxy and the heretical movements within it (the "destructive" ones) caused a commotion that echoed in the public sphere and led to the publicizing of the Church among Pagans and Jews. Furthermore, the creation of a significant organizational network that became an effective communication network (the periodic meetings of local bishops in synods) helped the Church in activating its "branches" throughout the world. An additional tool that Mendels expands upon is the mission (which was lacking in Judaism of the time). The Church made the mission into one of its foundation stones in order to extend its reach to as broad a base of communities as possible. As such, the mission was a most important marketing strategy. Similarly, Mendels draws our attention to the fact that the emperors themselves, both those who persecuted the Christians and those who nullified the decrees, would issue edicts for or against the Christians that were distributed throughout the empire. Even those that were negative in nature added to the other attempts at communication. It was these communication tools (alongside an attractive message), according to Mendels, that transformed the Church into a universal entity.

This book is summarized in a Hebrew article that was published in the periodical Zemanim.

==== Memory in Jewish, Pagan and Christian Societies of the Graeco-Roman World ====
This book was published in 2004 by Clark-Continuum in London. It deals with memory in ancient societies of the Greco-Roman world.

Various chapters deal with different types of historical and public memory, and its expression in literature, in historiography, and to some degree in physical monuments. For example, in a chapter on The Persians of Aeschylus, Mendels examines a number of alternative narratives of remembrance that were embedded in the population of Athens after the Battle of Salamis. In another chapter, Mendels shows how the memory of ancient history was created in western society. Historical memory was influenced already in the ancient world by the creation of a canon by historians. Mendels demonstrates the processes by which a canon was created, a process that led to a selectivity of what would remain of the works of historians of the ancient period. Thus, the picture of ancient history in Western culture, beginning during the period of the Renaissance, is very partial. The book challenges the concept of collective memory prevailing in research from the time of Maurice Halbwachs; and Mendels claims that it is not entirely correct to talk about collective memory, but rather about partial memory (fragmentary), entrenched within different sub-groups within the collective. These group memories do not necessarily complement each other, but compete and conflict with each other. Mendels was one of the first to deal with these topics within the context of the ancient world.

==== On Memory: An Interdisciplinary Approach ====
This book, edited by Doron Mendels, was published in 2007 by Peter Lang in Oxford. The idea developed for Mendels in light of his conclusions in the book surveyed above that in reality one should only talk about partial memories of sub-groups within the collective. The idea launched a conference connected to a group that dealt with communication and the Jewish world in the context of the Institute for Advanced Studies at the Hebrew University in 2005 (some of the participants in the group were Elihu Katz, Menachem Blondheim, Arye Edrei, Tamar Liebes, Shmuel Feiner, Hayim Soloveitchik, and Dror Warman). The book, which is a collection of the lectures delivered at the conference in the spring of 2007, includes the participation of experts from a variety of disciplines. Among the disciplines connected to memory, articles represented the disciplines of law (Nili Cohen), the brain (from the natural sciences: Idan Segev and Hermona Soreq), anthropology (Yoram Bilu and Moshe Shoked), psychology (Amiya Leiblich and Yonatan Slavin), Hebrew literature (Dan Laor), Israeli society and the holocaust (Arye Edrei), and philosophy (Jeffrey Barash).

Mendels himself wrote the introduction in which he brings a concrete example of the nature of memory from the "public" drawing of the Renaissance period in early Italy. In addition, he wrote an article on the novella of Günter Grass, "Crabwalk", in which he tries to give an example of the fragmentation of memory in contemporary Germany. According to the analysis in the article, the collective memory of World War II exists in Germany as a dark background, but some groups have adopted for themselves fragments of memories from the past, at times very marginal, which can bring disastrous results when attempting to revive them.

==== Zweierlei Diaspora. Zur Spaltung der antiken jüdischen Welt ====
This book that Mendels wrote in conjunction with Arye Edrei, a professor of Jewish law at Tel Aviv University, and is published in German by Vandenhoek & Ruprecht in Goettingen, Germany, argues that contrary to the accepted scholarly view, the Rabbis in the first centuries of the common era did not have control or authority over the western Greek-speaking (and subsequently Latin speaking) Jewish diaspora. Neither the Rabbis nor other people cared to translate the rabbinic corpus into Greek or Latin (perhaps of the simple reason that it was kept oral for centuries). Hence the Jews in Asia Minor, Greece, the Aegean Islands, Italy, France, Spain, and Egypt, who were Greek-speaking, were almost completely cut off from rabbinic Judaism that functioned in the Land of Israel and Babylonia because they had no common language of communication. As a result of this gap, two types of Jews were created – those who accepted rabbinic literature and all that it implies, and those in the west who remained biblical Jews without the oral law that developed in the east. Also, the eastern Jews (i.e., in the Land of Israel and eastward in the direction of Babylonia) who did not accept the Rabbis had the potential to accept them (because they knew Aramaic and Hebrew, in contrast to the western Jews who practically could not communicate because they lacked the knowledge of these languages). Rabbinic literature, such as the Mishnah, the Talmud and the Midrashim, penetrated into Western Europe only in the 8th and 9th centuries. At that point, the intensive familiarity of the Jews with this literature began. By that point, many of the Jews of Europe had been wiped out, and a not insignificant portion had converted to Christianity. But the remainder of Jews accepted the corpus which was by then written down.

==== Why Did Paul Go West? Jewish Historical Narrative and Thought ====
The book addresses the topic of the authority of texts and their transmission, as well as different strategies of narration in ancient texts. The book also provides an extensive treatment of issues such as linearity, temporality, and simultaneity in historical texts, while examining four core themes. First, the narrator and his strategies in the historiography of the Hellenistic period. Secondly, Jewish historical thought as expressed in the 1 Book of Maccabees. Thirdly, issues of Hellenization in Palestine – power, honor, peace, gifting, etiquette in general, sovereignty, and political theology and their presentation in the main narrative of the Hasmonean period, the 1 Book of Maccabees. Finally, the issue of public memory also gets a significant place in the discussions in the various chapters of the book.

==== History as Repetition: Can we affect its Course ====
This book by Mendels was published in 2017 by Amazon Kindle Edition. The author comes to the conclusion that history is activated by what he calls a “group genome,” which is imbued in any group, state, empire, etc. Schematically seen, such a genome is composed of a triangle. One angle signifies the group's set of characteristics (territoriality, imitation, division and unity, etc.), the other symbolizes the scale of values, whereas the third one presents group emotions. The book deals with the mechanisms of the constant interaction between the "angles", triggered either from within the group or outside it. The triangle is usually managed by what Mendels calls a “brain” which can be a tribal assembly of chiefs, democratic as well as dictatorial governments and even god/s. In examining many cases drawn from the history of mankind, Mendels points to repetitions, not of events, but of manners of conduct and behavior of groups. He thinks that the interaction within the triangle of each group and its role in history should be taught at schools and universities; this will increase the awareness of humans of their potential to influence the course of history.

==== Hellenistic Inter-State Political Ethics and the Emergence of the Jewish State ====
The book was published by Bloomsbury & Clark (London) and reconstructs a Hellenistic inter-state ethical code. The book shows how concepts such as liberty, justice, fairness, loyalty, reciprocity, adherence to ancestral laws, compassion, accountability, and love of fatherland became meaningful in the relations between nations in the Hellenistic Mediterranean sphere, as well as between ruling empires and their subject states. The emerging Jewish state echoed this ethical system.

==== A Hellenistic Ethical Lexicon. Three Hundred and Seven Rules of Conduct of Expanding Empires ====
The book was published by Bloomsbury Publishing in 2025. It is a collection of 307 inter-state ethical rules of conduct restored and collected to form a complete (oral) catalogue, unknown so far. This discovery enriches our knowledge about the universe against which Judaism and early Christianity operated.

==== Current research ====
Mendels, together with Dr. Guy Darshan, has for a number of years been actively writing a comprehensive commentary on the Book of 1 Maccabees for the series "Hermeneia", published by Fortress Press.

In an article published recently in a volume edited by L.I. Levine and D.R. Schwartz (Jewish Identities in Antiquity, Tuebignen, 2009), pp. 41–54 Mendels argues that there exists a gap between the myth of Hellenization—which has become a metaphor for the struggle of Jewish continuity over the ages – and the actual historic record from the period itself. The sources from the period do not indicate any real link between Hellenization and the struggle for Jewish religious autonomy in the 160s BCE. Even if representatives of the Seleucid king—probably not the king himself—ordered the Jews to abandon the Torah with all its ritual commandments, the king did not make a further step and order their Hellenization. The Seleucid kings, in line with Hellenistic kings in general, did not launch a Hellenistic mission and did not have any other strategies of cultural imperialism. The Jews who did undergo a process of Hellenization were a minority and this "conversion" was not forced upon them by the rulers.

The article “How was Antiquity Treated in Societies with a Hellenistic Heritage? And Why Did the Rabbis Avoid Writing History?” in G.Gardner and Kevin L. Osterloh, Antiquity in Antiquity. Jewish and Christian Pasts in the Greco-Roman World (Mohr Siebeck, Tuebingen 2008), pp. 131–151 deals with theoretical aspects of the literary strategies ancient societies used for coping with their pasts. Against this background the avoidance of writing history by the Rabbis is clarified.

In 2011 the article “Was the Rejection of Gifts One of the Reasons for the Outbreak of the Maccabean Revolt? A Preliminary Note on the Role of Gifting in the Book of 1 Maccabees,” appeared in the Journal for the Study of the Pseudepigrapha 20.4 (2011), pp. 243–256. The article deals with the role of gift-giving during the period of the first Hasmoneans. Whereas Mattathias rejected gifts and other grants offered by the Seleucids (and by doing so sharpened the rift between Jews and Seleucids), from Jonathan onwards the Hasmoneans became players within this framework of gifting on the international scene and enter into the complex network of gifting and reciprocity. A distinction between gift, grant and concession is drawn, taking into account various aspects such as valuability (value of gift), status (the social status of giver and receiver), supplementation (rhetoric that is considered to be part and parcel of gifting in Hellenistic etiquette), as well as compatibility (whether the gift is in proportion to the wealth of the giver and to the occasion it was given). "

In the article “Oral Group Memory- Written Fragmented Memory: A Note on Paul and the Jews,” which appeared in the Journal for the Study of the New Testament 41.1 (2018), pp. 70–81, Mendels returns to the subject of public memory and its manifestations. He claims that at the time that Paul was writing his letters, the stories about the conflicts of Jesus with Palestinian Jews were still oral. In order to attract the Jews in the Western Diaspora, Paul ignored the oral memories (as well as his own bitter memories from Palestine) and mentioned in his letters only the crucifixion of Jesus, which, with one exception (1 Thessalonians), became a written fragment that dropped the blame of the Jews. Hence, alongside his mission to gentiles, Paul addressed Jews in synagogues and other mixed audiences, and by such a clever strategy, he started the media revolution of early Christianity.

In line with his research on “audience is the message- the message is the audience”, Mendels published his article on 2 Maccabees. The article argues that 2 Maccabees has a two-fold message, one for Hellenistic Jews, a matter which was researched ad nauseam and is not tackled here. The other, a message to Greek pagans which demonstrates what an autonomous city within a Hellenistic environment was like, is the main theme of the article. Mendels argues that 2 Maccabees reflects a microcosm of the socio-economic and cultural reality of the second century B.C in the Hellenistic world, and unfolds an important message in political science concerning a politeia (constitution) and its ideal relationship with the dominant empire.

== Bibliography ==
- The Land of Israel as a Political Concept in Hasmonean Literature : Recourse to History in Second Century B.C. Claims to the Holy Land (Tuebingen : J. C. B. Mohr, 1987)
- The Rise and Fall of Jewish Nationalism. Jewish and Christian Ethnicity in Ancient Palestine (Grand Rapids, Michigan: William B. Eerdmans, 1997)
- Jewish Identity in the Hellenistic Period (Tel Aviv: The Broadcast University, Department of Defense Publishing), 1995 (in Hebrew)
- Identity, Religion and Historiography : Studies in Hellenistic History (Sheffield, U.K. : Sheffield Academic Press, 1998)
- The Media Revolution of Early Christianity : An Essay on Eusebius's Ecclesiastical History (Grand Rapids, Michigan: William B. Eerdmans, 1999)
- Memory in Jewish, Pagan, and Christian Societies of the Graeco-Roman World (London – New York : T & T Clark International, 2004).
- Doron Mendels und Arye Edrei, Zweierlei Diaspora. Zur Spaltung der antiken jüdischen Welt (Vandenhoeck&Ruprecht, Goettingen 2010).
- Why Did Paul Go West? Jewish Historical Narrative and Thought, (Bloomsbury London-New York, 2013).
- History as Repetition: Can we affect its Course? (Amazon Kindle Edition 2017).
  - German translation in Amazon Kindle: "Warum Geschichte wiederkehrt: Reflexionen eines Historikers" translated by Regina Randhofer, 2018.
- Hellenistic Inter-State Political Ethics and the Emergence of the Jewish State (London: Bloomsbury -t&tClark, 2022).
- A Hellenistic Ethical Lexicon. Three Hundred and Seven Rules of Conduct of Expanding Empires" (Bloomsbury, London, 2025).

== Edited works ==
- The German Border of the Roman Empire (with Michael Toch) (Jerusalem: Magnes Press, The Hebrew University, 1995)
- On Memory. An Interdisciplinary Approach (Oxford – Vienna: Peter Lang AG, 2007)
