= Eric Klann =

American neuroscientist

Eric Klann is an American neuroscientist who studies how molecular signaling, synaptic plasticity, and behavior are altered in developmental disability, autism, aging, psychiatric disorders, and Alzheimer's disease.

His research is focused on the molecular mechanisms underlying activity-dependent, long-lasting changes in neuronal function and the role these mechanisms play in complex behaviors, including cognition.

As a postdoctoral fellow in David Sweatt's laboratory at Baylor College of Medicine, Klann was the first to demonstrate that persistent protein kinase activity was associated with long-lasting synaptic plasticity.

After becoming an independent investigator, his laboratory was the first to show that at low concentrations, reactive oxygen species (ROS), which are typically considered to be neurotoxic, are in fact signaling molecules that are required for synaptic plasticity and long-term memory. By contrast, Klann's laboratory has also shown that removal of ROS can prevent age- and Alzheimer's disease-related impairments in synaptic plasticity and memory.

Klann's laboratory made additional breakthroughs in the mid-2000s. It has been known since the 1960s that new protein synthesis (translation) was necessary for the formation of long-term memory. However, the mechanisms that regulate this process were not understood until Klann's laboratory published a number of seminal studies describing the translational control mechanisms that are required for proper long-lasting synaptic plasticity and long-term memory. In addition, Klann's laboratory subsequently demonstrated that dysregulated translational control mechanisms are involved in several brain disorders, including fragile X syndrome and autism.

His laboratory uses a number of experimental approaches to dissect the molecular mechanisms necessary for maintaining long-lasting changes in synaptic strength and memory. Detailed biochemical and sophisticated imaging experiments are employed to delineate the molecular signaling cascades that are activated and required for long-lasting synaptic plasticity in the hippocampus, amygdala, cortex, and striatum, and whether these signaling events are required for memory formation, social behaviors, and behavioral flexibility.

Klann's laboratory also conducts electrophysiological, biochemical, imaging, and behavioral studies with various knockout and transgenic mice to determine how precise genetic manipulations that either activate or abolish signaling cascades alter synaptic function and behavior.

Klann serves as a reviewing editor for The Journal of Neuroscience and as an associate editor for Neurobiology of Learning and Memory, and serves on the editorial boards of several other journals. He is a former member and chair of both the Neural Oxidative Metabolism & Death and the Molecular & Cellular Substrates of Complex Disorders Study Sections of the National Institutes of Health. Klann serves on the Scientific Advisory Boards of the Foundation for Angelman Syndrome Therapeutics and Pitt Hopkins Syndrome International Network. He also served on the Fragile X Outcomes Measures Group and the Fragile X Syndrome Research Plan Working Group of the National Institutes of Health. Klann also was the treasurer (2010-2012) and is a past president of the Molecular and Cellular Cognition Society.

Klann received his Ph.D. from the Medical College of Virginia, did postdoctoral training at Baylor College of Medicine, and held faculty positions at the University of Pittsburgh (1994-2001) and Baylor College of Medicine (2001-2006) before joining the faculty of New York University in 2006.

== Selected publications ==
- Klann, E., Chen, S.-J. and Sweatt, J.D. (1991) Persistent protein kinase activation in the maintenance phase of long-term potentiation. J. Biol. Chem. 266: 24253–24256.
- Klann, E., Chen, S.-J., and Sweatt, J.D. (1993) Mechanism of protein kinase C activation during the induction and maintenance of long-term potentiation probed using a selective peptide substrate. Proc. Natl. Acad. Sci. USA 90: 8337–8341.
- Klann, E., Roberson, E.D., Knapp, L.T., and Sweatt, J.D. (1998) A role for superoxide in protein kinase C activation and induction of long-term potentiation. J. Biol. Chem. 273: 4516–4522.
- Thils, E., Urban, N.N., Gonzalez-Burgos, G.R., Kanterewicz, B.I., Barrionuevo, G., Chu, C.T., Oury, T.D., and Klann, E. (2000) Impairment of long-term potentiation and associative memory in mice that overexpress extracellular superoxide dismutase. J. Neurosci. 20: 7631–7639.
- Knapp, L.T. and Klann, E. (2002) Potentiation of hippocampal synaptic transmission by superoxide requires the oxidative activation of protein kinase C. J. Neurosci. 22: 674–683.
- Kishida, K.T., Hoeffer, C.A., Hu, D., Pao, M., Holland, S.M., and Klann, E. (2006) Synaptic plasticity deficits and mild memory impairments in mouse models of chronic granulomatous disease. Mol. Cell. Biol. 26: 5908–5920.
- Hou, L. and Klann, E. (2004) Activation of the phosphoinositide 3-kinase - Akt - mammalian target of rapamycin signaling pathway is required for metabotropic glutamate receptor-dependent long-term depression. J. Neurosci. 24: 6352–6361.
- Banko, J.L., Poulin, F., Hou, L., DeMaria, C.T., Sonenberg, N., and Klann, E. (2005) The translation repressor 4E-BP2 is a critical regulator of eIF4F complex formation, synaptic plasticity, and memory in the hippocampus. J. Neurosci. 25: 9581–9590.
- Banko, J.L., Hou, L., Poulin, F., Sonenberg, N., and Klann, E. (2006) Regulation of eukaryotic initiation factor 4E by converging signaling pathways during metabotropic glutamate receptor-dependent long-term depression. J. Neurosci. 26: 2167–2173.
- Hoeffer, C.A., Tang, W., Wong, H., Santillan, A., Patterson, R.J., Martinez, L.A., Tejada-Simon, M.V., Paylor, R., Hamilton, S.L., and Klann, E. (2008) Removal of FKBP12 enhances mTOR/Raptor interactions, LTP, memory, and perseverative/repetitive behavior. Neuron 60: 832–845.
- Hoeffer, C.A., Cowansage, K.K., Arnold, E.C., Banko, J.L., Moerke, N.J., Rodriguez, R., Schmidt, E.K., Klosi, E., Chorev, M., Lloyd, R.E., Pierre, P., Wagner, G., LeDoux, J.E., and Klann, E. (2011) Inhibition of the interactions between translation initiation factors eIF4E and eIF4G impairs long-term associative memory consolidation but not reconsolidation. Proc. Natl. Acad. Sci. USA 108: 3383–3388.
- Trinh, M.A., Kaphzan, H., Wek, R.C., Pierre, P., Cavener, D.R., and Klann, E. (2012) Brain-specific disruption of the eIF2a kinase PERK decreases ATF4 expression and impairs behavioral flexibility. Cell Rep. 1: 676–688.
- Hou, L., Antion, M.D., Hu, D., Spencer, C.M., Paylor, R.E., and Klann, E. (2006) Dynamic translational and proteasomal regulation of fragile X mental retardation protein controls mGluR-dependent long-term depression. Neuron 51: 441–454.
- Sharma, A., Hoeffer, C.A., Takayasu, Y., Miyawaki, T., McBride, S.M., Klann, E., and Zukin, R.S. (2010) Dysregulation of mTOR signaling in fragile X syndrome. J. Neurosci. 30: 694–702.
- Bhattacharya, A., Kaphzan, H., Alvarez-Dieppa, A.C., Murphy, J.P., Pierre, P., and Klann, E. (2012) Genetic removal of p70 S6 kinase 1 corrects molecular, synaptic, and behavioral phenotypes in fragile X syndrome mice. Neuron 76: 325–337.
- Santini, E., Huynh, T.N., MacAskill, A.F., Carter, A.G., Pierre, P., Ruggero, D., Kaphzan, H., and Klann, E. (2013) Exaggerated translation causes synaptic and behavioural aberrations associated with autism. Nature 493: 411–415.
- Hu, D., Serrano, F., Oury, T.D., and Klann, E. (2006) Aging-dependent alterations in synaptic plasticity and memory in mice that overexpress extracellular superoxide dismutase. J. Neurosci. 26: 3933–3941.
- Massaad, C.A., Washington, T.M., Pautler, R.G., and Klann, E. (2009) Overexpression of SOD-2 reduces hippocampal superoxide and prevents memory deficits in a mouse model of Alzheimer's disease. Proc. Natl. Acad. Sci. USA 106: 13576–13581.
- Ma, T., Hoeffer, C.A., Wong, H., Massaad, C.A., Zhou, P., Iadecola, C., Murphy, M.P., Pautler, R.G., and Klann, E. (2011) Amyloid b-induced impairments in hippocampal synaptic plasticity are rescued by decreasing mitochondrial superoxide. J. Neurosci. 31: 5589–5595.
- Ma, T., Du, X., Pick, J.E., Sui, G., Brownlee, M., and Klann, E. (2012) Glucagon-like peptide-1 cleavage product GLP-1 (9-36) amide rescues synaptic plasticity and memory deficits in Alzheimer's disease model mice. J. Neurosci. 32: 13701–13708.
