= Frontiers for Young Minds =

- Discipline: Multidisciplinary
- Language: English
- Edited by: Robert T. Knight, Idan Segev

Publication details
- History: 2013–present
- Publisher: Frontiers Media
- Open access: Yes

Standard abbreviations
- ISO 4: Front. Young Minds

Indexing
- ISSN: 2296-6846
- OCLC no.: 1117854725

Links
- Journal homepage; Online archive

Frontiers for Young Minds is an open-access academic journal that publishes articles "edited by kids for kids". Robert T. Knight launched the journal at a 2013 Society for Neuroscience conference. It is published by Frontiers Media.

The journal covers STEM research and allows young scientists, from ages 8 to 15 years old, to participate in the publishing process (not as authors). It has won awards for its review process, easy-to-navigate website, informative visual aids including colorful cartoons, and kid-friendly, accessible writing.

== Editorial structure ==
=== Editorial process ===
Established scientists write kid-friendly articles on either core concepts or new discoveries in their fields. To make the scientific research comprehensible for the journal's late elementary and middle school audiences, the articles rely heavily on key words and glossary sections for scientific nomenclature.

After the submission passes a preliminary evaluation by an adult editor, subsequently school-aged children decide whether the articles should be published. Alongside a science mentor, a student from the 3rd to 10th grade reviews the articles and provides feedback about the papers' clarity and accessibility. Then, the original writers, science mentors, and adult editors collaborate to revise the article based on the children's comments.

According to the journal's founders Sabine Kastner and Robert T. Knight, the goal of this process is to expose young children to a wide range of current scientific endeavors, the scientific method and procedures, and the review process of scientific articles.

=== Editors-in-chief ===
- Robert T. Knight (University of California, Berkeley), 2013–present
- Idan Segev (Hebrew University of Jerusalem), ?–present

== Awards and nominations ==
- American Library Association's 2014 Great Websites for Kids
- Society for Neuroscience's 2019 Award for Education in Neuroscience
