= Frontiers in Cardiovascular Medicine =

- Discipline: Cardiology
- Language: English
- Edited by: Masanori Aikawa, Hendrik Tevaearai Stahel

Publication details
- History: 2014–present
- Publisher: Frontiers Media
- Frequency: Continuous
- Open access: Yes
- License: CC BY
- Impact factor: 3.6 (2022)

Standard abbreviations
- ISO 4: Front. Cardiovasc. Med.

Indexing
- CODEN: FCMRCE
- ISSN: 2297-055X
- LCCN: 2015243132
- OCLC no.: 889714507

Links
- Journal homepage; Online archive

Frontiers in Cardiovascular Medicine is a peer-reviewed open access scientific journal covering all aspects of cardiology and vascular medicine with an emphasis on studies that offer new treatments and practices or facilitate the translation of scientific advances into clinical practice. It was established in 2014 and is published by Frontiers Media. The editors-in-chief are Hendrik Tevaearai Stahel (Berne University Hospital) and Masanori Aikawa (Brigham and Women's Hospital, Harvard Medical School).

The journal is a member of the Committee on Publication Ethics.

== Abstracting and indexing ==
The journal is abstracted and indexed in Current Contents/Clinical Medicine, Directory of Open Access Journals, Embase, Science Citation Index Expanded, and Scopus. According to the Journal Citation Reports, the journal had a 2022 impact factor of 3.6.

== Controversy ==
On 7 May 2015, Frontiers removed 31 editors across Frontiers in Medicine and Frontiers in Cardiovascular Medicine, after a dispute with the editorial board. The editors complained that the company was interfering in editing decisions and acting in a way that violated core principles for medical publishing in general.

In a document sent to management, editors (including three editors-in-chief) cited multiple unethical issues with how Frontiers handled manuscripts, including that editors-in-chief are only notified of acceptances after an associate editor or guest editor has accepted a paper for publication. On the other hand, rejection of papers requires editor-in-chief approval. This, the editors allege, is a violation of the World Association of Medical Editors' guidelines. The editors also argued numerous other issues, such as the use of special issues (known as research topics) with no notice given to the editor-in-chief, violating editorial independence, and that the editors are often revoked from editing with no notice. This system, according the former editor-in-chief at these journals (Matthias Barton) maximizes profit over ethical publishing quality. In its 7 May 2015 announcement, Frontiers responded publicly to all points of concern and reported the matter to the boards of the three institutions (at that time) publishing ethical guidelines: ICMJE, WAME and COPE. As of 2024 Frontiers remains in compliance with those groups’ guidelines and is a member of COPE. The current field chief editors (Aikawa and Stahel) have secured an experienced editorial board to help ensure the journal’s editorial processes to protect quality.

In the same year, Frontiers Media was classified as a possible predatory publisher by Jeffrey Beall. However, Beall's list was taken offline two years later in a decision that remains controversial.
