= ICNC =

ICNC may refer to:

- Interdisciplinary Center for Neural Computation, an Israeli research centre linked to the Hebrew University
- International Center on Nonviolent Conflict, a non-profit institute involved with nonviolence strategy
- Isolated Congenital Nail Clubbing, a medical term
- Iranian Consortium of National Content, an Iranian consortium
- Information Communications Network LLC, a backbone network owner company in Mongolia.
