= The Journal of Neuroscience =

- 8 July 2026 issue cover
- Discipline: Neuroscience
- Language: English
- Edited by: Sabine Kastner

Publication details
- History: 1981–present
- Publisher: Society for Neuroscience (United States)
- Frequency: Weekly
- Impact factor: 4.0 (2024)

Standard abbreviations
- ISO 4: J. Neurosci.

Indexing
- CODEN: JNRSDS
- ISSN: 0270-6474 (print); 1529-2401 (web)
- LCCN: 81640907
- OCLC no.: 476317794

Links
- Journal homepage; Online access; Online archive

The Journal of Neuroscience, stylized as JNeurosci, is a weekly peer-reviewed scientific journal published by the Society for Neuroscience (SfN). It covers empirical research on all aspects of neuroscience. Its editor-in-chief is Sabine Kastner (Princeton University), who succeeded Marina Picciotto (Yale University) in 2024. According to the latest Journal Citation Reports, the journal has a 2024 impact factor of 4.0.

== History ==
The journal was established in 1981 and issues appeared monthly; as its popularity grew it switched to a biweekly schedule in 1996 and then to a weekly in July 2003.

== Themes ==
=== Main themes ===
Articles appear within one of the following five sections of the journal:

- Cellular/Molecular
- Development/Plasticity/Repair
- Systems/Circuits
- Behavioral/Cognitive
- Neurobiology of Disease

The journal has revised its sections over the years. In 2004, it added the Neurobiology of Disease section due to the growing number of papers on this subject. In January 2013, the journal split the section Behavioral/Systems/Cognitive into two sections, Systems/Circuits and Behavioral/Cognitive, in order to make the sections of the journal approximately the same in size.

Beginning February 2025, the journal permits submission of supplemental materials.

=== Features ===
In addition, some issues of the journal contain articles in the following sections:

- Brief Communications
- Journal Club (brief reviews of articles that appeared in the Journal; written by graduate students or postdoctoral fellows; first published in September 2005)

== See also ==
- Behavioral neuroscience
