= Frontiers in Endocrinology =

- Discipline: Endocrinology
- Language: English
- Edited by: Jeff M. P. Holly

Publication details
- History: 2010–present
- Publisher: Frontiers Media
- Frequency: Upon acceptance
- Open access: Yes
- License: Creative Commons Attribution
- Impact factor: 6.055 (2021)

Standard abbreviations
- ISO 4: Front. Endocrinol.

Indexing
- ISSN: 1664-2392
- OCLC no.: 1010654922

Links
- Journal homepage; Online archive

Frontiers in Endocrinology is a peer-reviewed open access scientific journal covering all aspects of endocrinology in 21 sections. It was established in 2010 and is published by Frontiers Media. The editor-in-chief is Jeffrey M. P. Holly (University of Bristol).

== Abstracting and indexing ==
The journal is abstracted and indexed in:

- BIOSIS Previews
- EBSCO databases
- PubMed
- Pubmed Central
- Embase/Excerpta Medica
- Science Citation Index Expanded
- Scopus

According to the Journal Citation Reports, the journal has an impact factor of 6.055 in 2021

== History ==
From 1993 to 1995 a monographic series named Frontiers in Endocrinology (ISSN 1124-1292) was published by Ares-Serono Symposia Publications for 15 volumes. The current journal was established in 2010. In order to distinguish the two periodicals some indices use the names Frontiers in Endocrinology (Rome, Italy) for the older series and Frontiers in Endocrinology (Lausanne) for the current journal.
