= Edmond and Lily Safra Center for Brain Sciences =

Research center at the Hebrew University of Jerusalem

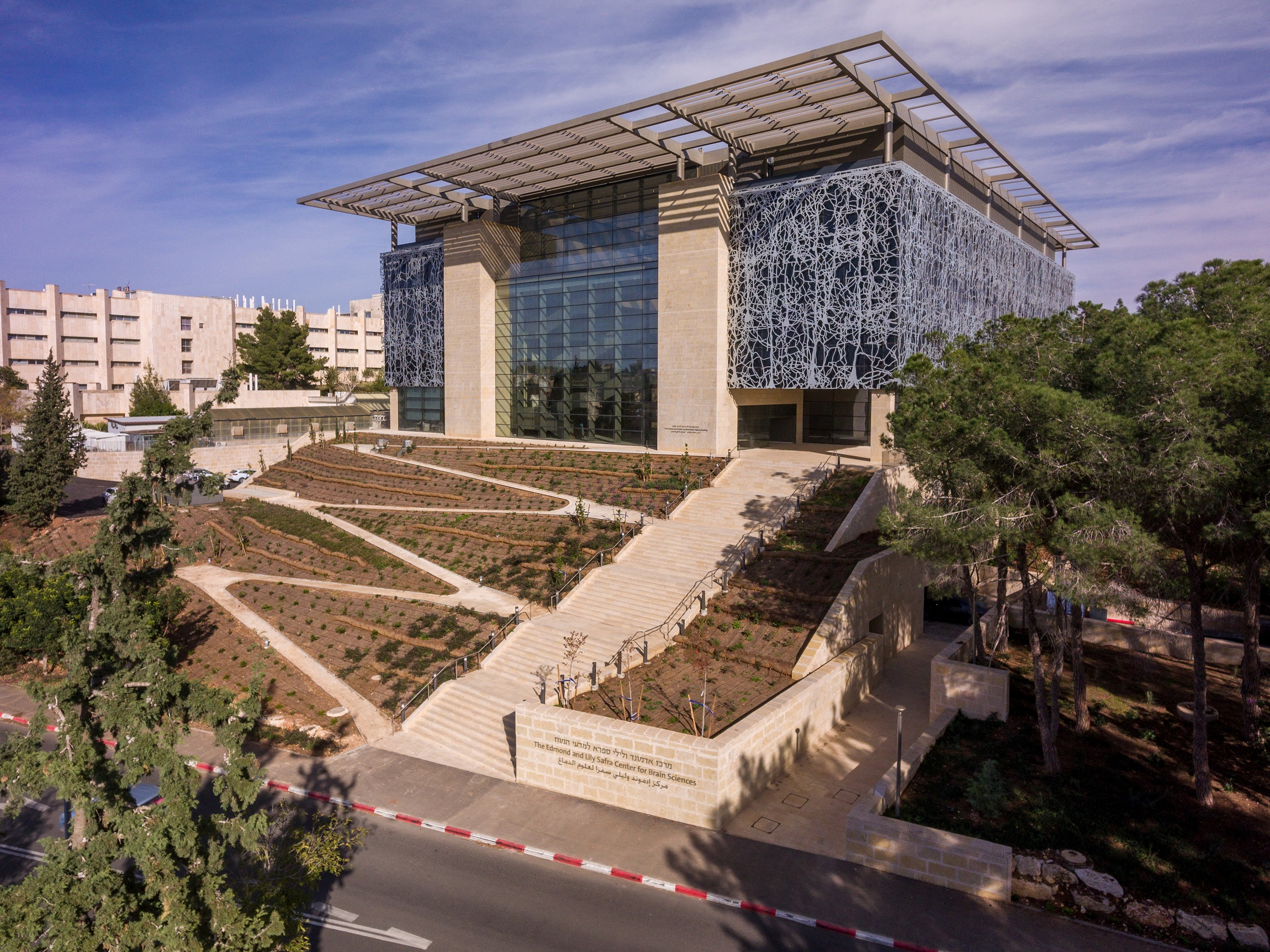
- Founder: Eilon Vaadia
- Established: 2009
- Address: Edmond J. Safra campus, Givat Ram, Jerusalem
- Location: Hebrew University of Jerusalem
- Coordinates: 31°46′17″N 35°11′49″E
- Interactive map of Edmond and Lily Safra Center for Brain Sciences
- Website: elsc.huji.ac.il

Edmond and Lily Safra Center for Brain Sciences (ELSC) (Hebrew: מרכז אדמונד ולילי ספרא למדעי המוח) is a brain science research center affiliated with Hebrew University of Jerusalem. The director of the center is Prof. Leon Y. Deouell.

== History ==
The Edmond and Lily Safra Center for Brain Sciences was established in 2009. It is located in the Goodman Brain Sciences building on the Edmond J. Safra campus of the Hebrew University in Givat Ram, Jerusalem. The mission of the center is to gain more insight into the theoretical, biological and cognitive aspects of the brain; pursue interdisciplinary research to meet the scientific and technological challenges of the 21st century; promote academic collaboration and engage in community outreach.

In 1991, the university founded the Interdisciplinary Center for Neural Computation (ICNC) which introduced a new interdisciplinary doctoral program combining life science, psychology, cognition and other disciplines associated with brain research.

In 2006, the president of Hebrew University, Menachem Magidor, appointed the Neuroscience International Review Committee to explore possibilities for the expansion of neuroscience research. With the financial support of the Edmond Safra Foundation, the university opened a new center dedicated to the study of the brain.

The center's International Steering Committee established in 2009 is composed of 11 prominent neuroscientists, including Nobel laureates Bert Sakmann, Richard Axel and Edvard Moser.

== Academic programs ==
The center runs two main academic programs: A five-year Ph.D. program in computational neuroscience open to students from many different disciplines established in 1992; and an undergraduate program offering a major track in brain sciences and a minor track in computational neuroscience established in 2021. Classes are held in English, which makes study accessible to foreign students from around the world.

== Scientific research ==
Research at ELSC focuses on enhancing the understanding of brain mechanisms, spanning genetic, molecular, cellular and synaptic levels, as well as theoretical and computational studies of biological and artificial neural networks. This basic scientific research of brain function also extends to investigations of brain dysfunction, incorporating translational and clinical research. This includes psychological studies such as those by ELSC member Merav Ahissar to elucidate conditions such as dyslexia and autism. Ami Citri's lab uses molecular, synaptic, local circuit and behavioral data to study a small region of the brain called the claustrum. Varying its activity levels in mice has been shown to affect sleep, responsiveness and impulsive behavior – findings which could lead to new treatments for disorders like ADHD.

Advanced quantitative MRI methods are employed by ELSC member Aviv Mezer and his team to characterize changes in the biological composition of brain tissue as a person ages.

Other studies utilize diverse methodologies, ranging from transcriptomics to electrophysiology and neuron-imaging, specifically targeting age-related diseases such as Parkinson's and Alzheimer's.

In 2024, ELSC members have published studies that offer new perspectives on the brain, such as the research of Naomi Habib and her team on early stage detection of Alzheimer's; the questioning of the role of neurons as being responsible for all important processes in the brain by Inbal Goshen and her team and the finding of David Omer and his team that marmosets, a nonhuman primate, call each other by designated names.

Naomi Habib uses data from 1.6 million cells analyzed by algorithms and machine-learning techniques to identify specific cellular interactions. The study shows that Alzheimer's disease is not just a form of accelerated aging. On the basis of molecular markers, scientists will be able to pinpoint an individual's "cellular path" and likelihood of developing the disease.

Inbal Goshen challenges the traditional view that neurons alone are responsible for brain processing. She shows that astrocytes (non-neuronal brain cells) play an important role in brain plasticity and memory, so that stimulating astrocyte activity may alleviate Alzheimer's associated plaques.

David Omer challenges the Chomskyan view that human language is unique to humans by showing that name-like reference isn’t. His lab’s 2024 Science study demonstrates that marmosets learn and use individual “vocal labels” to address specific others, reshaping ideas about vocal communication and its neural bases.

== Awards and recognition ==
Hagai Bergman, a neuroscientist and physician at ELSC and the Faculty of Medicine of the Hebrew University, was awarded the Israel Prize for Life Sciences in 2024. Bergman's research has enhanced understanding of basal ganglia physiology and made significant contributions to the study and treatment of Parkinson's disease.

In 2024, Haim Sompolinsky, one of the founders of the center, was the first Israeli scientist to win the Brain Prize, an international prize awarded annually to leading brain researchers. Sompolinsky, a pioneer in computational neuroscience, uses theoretical models like the "ring attractor" to study the dynamics of neuronal networks and their relation to animal and human behavior.

Hermona Soreq, another founding member of the center, won the 2022 EMET Prize for her research achievements in molecular biology, the nervous system and the genetics of degenerative diseases. Soreq's interdisciplinary approach has led to a better understanding of the role of acetylcholine in the brain and its involvement in the brain's response to stressful situations.

In 2021, Naomi Habib, an assistant professor at ELSC, won the Krill Prize for Excellence in Scientific Research for her study of communication between brain cells and how the immune system and environmental risk factors impact on aging. Her focus is on the mechanisms that lead to devastating brain diseases like Alzheimer's. By mapping cellular changes, she seeks to discover both triggers of the disease and protective molecules.

In 2010, Baruch Minke, professor emeritus at ELSC, won the EMET Prize for brain research and the 2010 Prince of Asturias Award for Technical and Scientific Research. Minke discovered a new type of ion channel, the Transient Receptor Potential or TRP channel while studying phototransduction and vision in fruit flies.

== Architecture ==
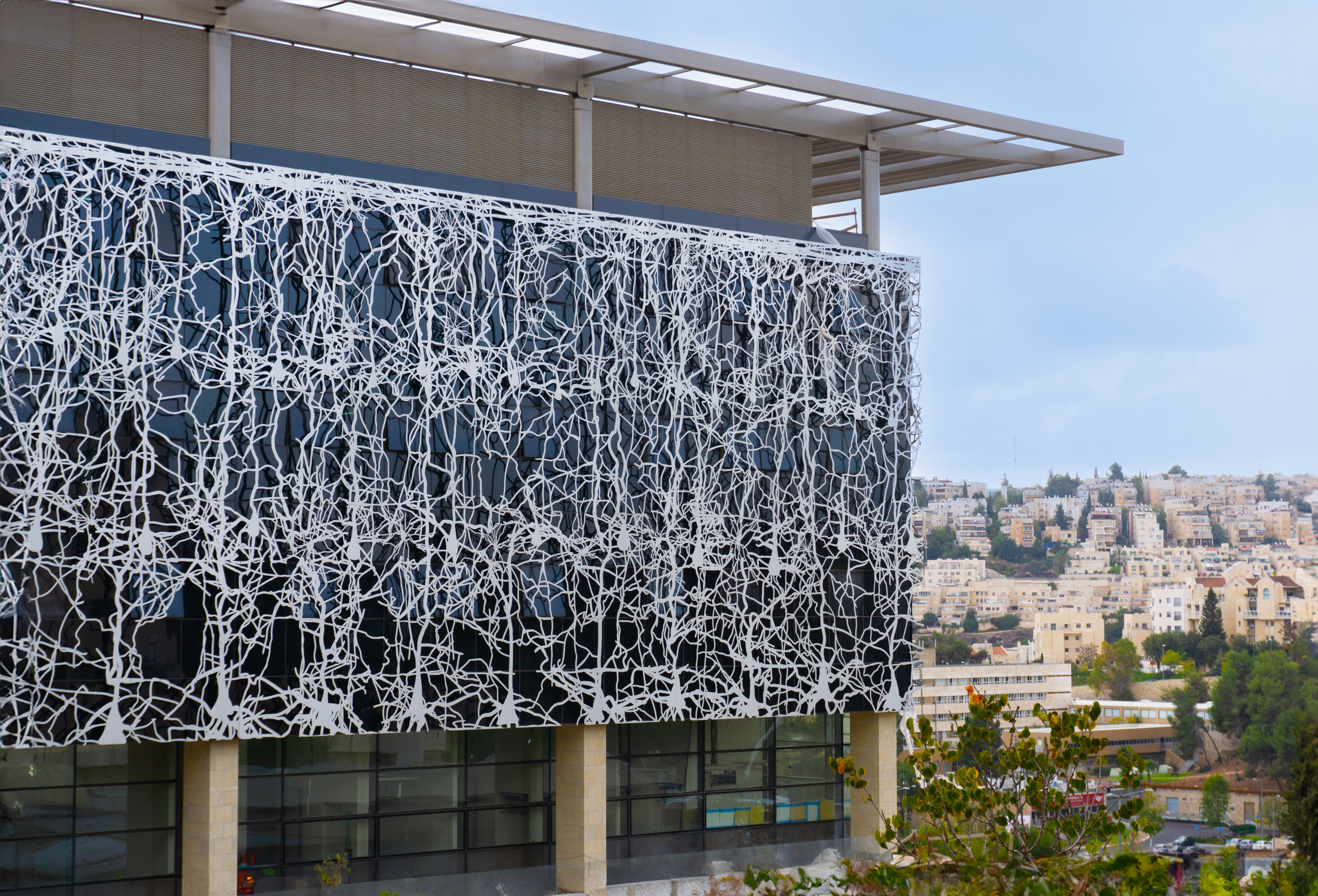
ELSC neuron screen

The Goodman Brain Sciences building was designed by the British architect Norman Foster. The building is a reinforced concrete structure with an overhanging steel roof. Construction commenced in 2013 under the supervision of an Israeli architectural firm.

The façade consists of an aluminum "neuron screen" inspired by the drawings of Santiago Ramón y Cajal. The data for the screen was derived from a digital reconstruction of the neurons of a rat brain provided by Henry Markram and ELSC member Idan Segev.

The architectural team placed great emphasis on environmental design for optimal energy saving. The building consists of two parallel wings housing 28 labs around an open central courtyard. In an interview with Haaretz newspaper, Spencer de Grey, the chief designer of the project, commented that in his opinion the common spaces were the most important part of the building.

== Facilities ==
=== Viral vector core unit ===
The Vector Core Facility is a core technology and research center for the design of viral vectors used to deliver genetic material into cells.

=== Fablab ===
The Fablab is a fabrication laboratory for the design of custom hardware solutions for neuroscience experiments. The unit uses 3-D printers and CNC milling machines.

=== MRI neuroimaging unit ===
In 2012, the center opened a unit for imaging services for all Hebrew University laboratories. In addition to its MRI scanner, eye-tracking system, BIOPAC system, active noise control system and visual stimuli delivery system, the unit provides assistance with paradigms and scanning optimization.

=== Core microscopy unit ===
The center runs a core microscopy unit open to all Hebrew University laboratories. It is equipped with multi-photon, confocal and fluorescence microscopes, and provides consulting services.

== Community outreach ==
To make science more accessible, ELSC holds conferences, seminars and cultural events that are open to the general public. "Art & Brain Week" is an annual event organized in collaboration with the Jerusalem Cinematheque which offers scientific lectures followed by films or cultural programs.

The center's Martine de Souza-Dassault Brain Art Gallery, also open to the public, displays art based on the science of the brain, and sponsors an artist residency program in which scientists team up with artists to discuss the workings of the brain and its impact on art.

== See also ==
- Science and technology in Israel
- Architecture of Israel
