= Innovative Health Initiative Joint Undertaking =

European pharmaceutical research initiative

- Joint Technology Initiative on Innovative Medicines
- Keywords: Drug discovery, Drug development
- Project type: Joint Technology Initiative (JTI)
- Funding agency: European Commission; European Federation of Pharmaceutical Industries and Associations (EFPIA)
- Framework programme: FP7
- Objective: Re-invigorate the European bio-pharmaceutical sector and to make Europe more attractive for private research and development (R&D) investment in this sector
- Budget: Total: 2 billion EUR; Funding: 1 billion EUR
- Duration: 2008 – 2017
- Website: www.imi.europa.eu

The Innovative Health Initiative Joint Undertaking (IHI JU) is a European initiative to improve the competitive situation of the European Union in the field of pharmaceutical research. The IHI is a joint initiative (public-private partnership) of the DG Research of the European Commission, representing the European Communities, and the European Federation of Pharmaceutical Industries and Associations (EFPIA). IHI is laid out as a Joint Technology Initiative within the Seventh Framework Programme. Michel Goldman was the first executive director, from September 2009 until December 2014.

The Innovative Medicines Initiative is aimed towards removing research bottlenecks in the current drug development process. The IHI Joint Technology Initiative (IHI JTI), to be implemented by the IHI Joint Undertaking is meant to address these research bottlenecks. Its €2bn budget makes it the largest biomedical public-private partnership in the world.

The funding scheme has been criticised, requiring universities to invest more money than with EU FP7 programs. Besides the non-competitive financial aspects of participation in IHI projects for academia, this criticism also discusses that intellectual property is freely flowing to industry.

The Sixth Framework Programme's research projects InnoMed AddNeuroMed and InnoMed PredTox acted as pilot projects establishing the feasibility of this particular public-private partnership. Since then, the IHI has had four funding rounds: the first call had the topic Safety, while the second call was about Efficacy. Projects for these two calls are ongoing.

The IMI 2 started in 2014 and will run until 2024, while the IMI 1 is still running. Overall budget is €3.276 billion, taken for half from the European Horizon 2020 program. Goals of that second calls are to improve clinical trials success rate, deliver clinical proof of concept, biomarkers and new medicines.

== IMI-Train ==
In September 2014 IMI-TRAIN, an IMI/ENSO-funded education and training collaboration to support biomedical scientists and professionals, has been launched. IMI-TRAIN will serve as a collaboration platform for the currently IMI-funded education and training projects:

- EMTRAIN: European Medicines Research Training Network
- Eu2P: European programme in Pharmacovigilance and Pharmacoepidemiology
- Pharmatrain: Pharmaceutical Medicine Training Programme
- SafeSciMET: Safety Sciences Modular Education and Training

== See also ==
- International Labour Organization
- World Intellectual Property Organization
