= Frontiers in Plant Science =

- Discipline: Botany
- Language: English
- Edited by: Yunde Zhao

Publication details
- History: 2010–present
- Publisher: Frontiers Media
- Impact factor: 6.627 (2021)

Standard abbreviations
- ISO 4: Front. Plant Sci.

Indexing
- ISSN: 1664-462X
- OCLC no.: 731659269

Links
- Journal homepage

Frontiers in Plant Science is a peer-reviewed scientific journal covering all aspects of botany. It was established in 2010 and is published by Frontiers Media. The editor-in-chief is Yunde Zhao (University of California, San Diego).

== Abstracting and indexing ==
Since 2019, the journal has a score of 2 in the Norwegian Scientific Index, which "covers the most prestigious and rigorous channels, which publish 20 percent of the publications".

According to the Frontiers, the journal Frontiers in Plant Science 2021 impact factor is 6.627.
