= Frontiers Media =

Swiss academic publisher of open access journals

- Founded: 2007; 19 years ago
- Founder: Kamila Markram and Henry Markram
- Country of origin: Switzerland
- Headquarters location: Lausanne
- Publication types: Open access scientific journals
- Nonfiction topics: Medicine, life sciences, technology
- No. of employees: >1,400 (2022)
- Official website: www.frontiersin.org

Frontiers Media SA is a publisher of peer-reviewed, open access, scientific journals currently active in science, technology, and medicine. It was founded in 2007 by Kamila and Henry Markram. Frontiers is based in Lausanne, Switzerland, with offices in the United Kingdom, Spain, and China. In 2022, Frontiers employed more than 1,400 people, across 14 countries. All Frontiers journals are published under a Creative Commons Attribution License.

The quality of editorial rigour at Frontiers journals has been the subject of serious scrutiny. In 2015, Frontiers Media was classified as a possible predatory publisher by Jeffrey Beall, though Beall's list was taken offline two years later after Frontiers applied pressure to Beall's employer, the University of Colorado, in a decision that remains controversial. As of 2022, 96 Frontiers journals are listed in the Norwegian Scientific Index, of which 2 have a rating of "level 2" (top 20% of all journals in their field), over 88 have a rating of "level 1" (standard academic), one has a rating of level X (possibly predatory), and five have a rating of "level 0" (not academic).

In 2022, various Swiss authors and institutions had a national publishing agreement with Frontiers through the Consortium of Swiss Academic Libraries (CSAL).

== History ==
The first journal published was Frontiers in Neuroscience, which opened for submission as a beta version in 2007. In 2010, Frontiers launched a series of another 11 journals in medicine and science. In February 2012, the Frontiers Research Network was launched, a social networking platform for researchers, intended to disseminate the open access articles published in the Frontiers journals, and to provide related conferences, blogs, news, video lectures and job postings.

In February 2013, the Nature Publishing Group (NPG) (now Nature Research) acquired a controlling interest in Frontiers Media, however collaboration between the Nature Publishing Group and Frontiers ended in 2015.

Frontiers for Young Minds was launched in November 2013 during the Annual Meeting of the Society for Neuroscience in collaboration with NPG as a web-based science journal that involves young people in the review of scientific articles with the help of scientists who act as mentors.

In early September 2014, Frontiers received the ALPSP Gold Award for Innovation in Publishing from the Association of Learned and Professional Society Publishers.

In October 2015, Frontiers (in collaboration with NPG) launched Loop, a research network that is open to be integrated into any publisher's or academic organization's website, and Loop soon included a collaboration with ORCID to link and synchronize researcher profile information. The Technical University of Madrid was the first university to link their Loop profile to their institutional website.

In 2019, Frontiers joined the Initiative for Open Citations.

In May 2020, Frontiers Media launched its Artificial Intelligence Review Assistant software to external editors. The software helps identify conflicts of interest and plagiarism, assesses manuscript and peer review quality, and recommends editors and reviewers, although the software does not flag all forms of conflict of interest, such as undisclosed funding sources or affiliations.

In 2022, a group of publishers including Frontiers Media joined the International Association of Scientific, Technical, and Medical Publishers' STM Integrity Hub, an initiative to provide publishers with tools to combat journal article submissions with integrity issues from research paper mills.

== List of journals ==
The Frontiers journals use open peer review, where the names of reviewers of accepted articles are made public.

In February 2016, the company published 54 journals, a number that grew to over 230 journals by 2024. The collection of all the journals in the series is sometimes considered a megajournal, as is the BioMed Central series. Some journals, such as Frontiers in Human Neuroscience or Frontiers in Microbiology are considered megajournals on their own. Some journals published by Frontiers are:

- Frontiers in Aging
- Frontiers in Aging Neuroscience
- Frontiers in Agronomy
- Frontiers in Allergy
- Frontiers in Analytical Science
- Frontiers in Animal Science
- Frontiers in Applied Mathematics and Statistics
- Frontiers in Artificial Intelligence
- Frontiers in Astronomy and Space Sciences
- Frontiers in Behavioral Neuroscience
- Frontiers in Big Data
- Frontiers in Bioengineering and Biotechnology
- Frontiers in Bioinformatics
- Frontiers in Biomaterials Science
- Frontiers in Bird Science
- Frontiers in Blockchain
- Frontiers in Built Environment
- Frontiers in Cardiovascular Medicine
- Frontiers in Catalysis
- Frontiers in Cell and Developmental Biology
- Frontiers in Cellular Neuroscience
- Frontiers in Cellular and Infection Microbiology
- Frontiers in Chemical Engineering
- Frontiers in Chemistry
- Frontiers in Climate
- Frontiers in Clinical Diabetes and Healthcare
- Frontiers in Communication
- Frontiers in Communications and Networks
- Frontiers in Computational Neuroscience
- Frontiers in Computer Science
- Frontiers in Conservation Science
- Frontiers in Control Engineering
- Frontiers in Dementia
- Frontiers in Dental Medicine
- Frontiers in Digital Health
- Frontiers in Digital Humanities
- Frontiers in Drug Delivery
- Frontiers in Drug Discovery
- Frontiers in Earth Science
- Frontiers in Ecology and Evolution
- Frontiers in Education
- Frontiers in Electronic Materials
- Frontiers in Electronics
- Frontiers in Endocrinology
- Frontiers in Energy Research
- Frontiers in Environmental Chemistry
- Frontiers in Environmental Health
- Frontiers in Environmental Science
- Frontiers in Epigenetics and Epigenomics
- Frontiers in Ethology
- Frontiers in Evolutionary Neuroscience
- Frontiers in Food Science and Technology
- Frontiers in Forests and Global Change
- Frontiers in Freshwater Science
- Frontiers in Fungal Biology
- Frontiers in Future Transportation
- Frontiers in Gastroenterology
- Frontiers in Genetics
- Frontiers in Genome Editing
- Frontiers in Geochemistry
- Frontiers in Global Women's Health
- Frontiers in Hematology
- Frontiers in Health Services
- Frontiers in Horticulture
- Frontiers in Human Dynamics
- Frontiers in Human Neuroscience
- Frontiers in ICT
- Frontiers in Immunology
- Frontiers in Insect Science
- Frontiers in Integrative Neuroscience
- Frontiers in International Journal of Public Health
- Frontiers in Manufacturing Technology
- Frontiers in Marine Science
- Frontiers in Materials
- Frontiers in Mechanical Engineering
- Frontiers in Medical Technology
- Frontiers in Medicine
- Frontiers in Microbiology
- Frontiers in Molecular Biosciences
- Frontiers in Molecular Medicine
- Frontiers in Molecular Neuroscience
- Frontiers in Nanotechnology
- Frontiers in Network Physiology
- Frontiers in Neural Circuits
- Frontiers in Neuroanatomy
- Frontiers in Neuroenergetics
- Frontiers in Neuroengineering
- Frontiers in Neuroergonomics
- Frontiers in Neuroimaging
- Frontiers in Neuroinformatics
- Frontiers in Neurology
- Frontiers in Neurorobotics
- Frontiers in Neuroscience
- Frontiers in Nuclear Medicine
- Frontiers in Nutrition
- Frontiers in Oncology
- Frontiers in Ophthalmology
- Frontiers in Oral Health
- Frontiers in Pain Research
- Frontiers in Pediatrics
- Frontiers in Pharmacology
- Frontiers in Photonics
- Frontiers in Physics
- Frontiers in Physiology
- Frontiers in Plant Science
- Frontiers in Political Science
- Frontiers in Psychiatry
- Frontiers in Psychology
- Frontiers in Public Health
- Frontiers in Quantum Science and Technology
- Frontiers in Radiology
- Frontiers in Rehabilitation Sciences
- Frontiers in Remote Sensing
- Frontiers in Reproductive Health
- Frontiers in Research Metrics and Analytics
- Frontiers in Robotics and AI
- Frontiers in Science
- Frontiers in Sensors
- Frontiers in Signal Processing
- Frontiers in Sociology
- Frontiers in Soil Science
- Frontiers in Space Technologies
- Frontiers in Sports and Active Living
- Frontiers in Surgery
- Frontiers in Sustainability
- Frontiers in Sustainable Agrifood Systems
- Frontiers in Sustainable Cities
- Frontiers in Sustainable Food Systems
- Frontiers in Synaptic Neuroscience
- Frontiers in Systems Biology
- Frontiers in Systems Neuroscience
- Frontiers in Thermal Engineering
- Frontiers in Toxicology
- Frontiers in Transplantation
- Frontiers in Tropical Diseases
- Frontiers in Tuberculosis
- Frontiers in Urology
- Frontiers in Veterinary Science
- Frontiers in Virology
- Frontiers in Virtual Reality
- Frontiers in Water

as well as

- Acta Biochimica Polonica
- Acta Virologica
- Advances in Drug and Alcohol Research
- Aerospace Research Communications
- British Journal of Biomedical Science
- Dystonia
- Earth Science, Systems and Society
- European Journal of Cultural Management and Policy
- Frontiers for Young Minds
- Journal of Abdominal Wall Surgery
- Journal of Cutaneous Immunology and Allergy
- Journal of Pharmacy & Pharmaceutical Sciences
- Oncology Reviews
- Pastoralism: Research, Policy and Practice
- Pathology & Oncology Research
- Public Health Reviews
- Spanish Journal of Soil Science
- Transplant International

== Indexing and abstracting ==
As of 2026, 159 Frontiers journals are listed in the Norwegian Scientific Index, of which 2 have a rating of "level 2" (top 20% of all journals in their field), over 145 have a rating of "level 1" (standard academic), and 5 have a rating of "level 0" (not academic).

As of 2026, Frontiers publishes over 222 academic journals, including 69 journals indexed within the Science Citation Index Expanded, and 5 journals indexed within the Social Sciences Citation Index, with a total of 146 journals ranked with an impact factor. Furthermore, as of 2021, 15 Frontiers Media journals have been selected for inclusion in MEDLINE.

In broader databases, Frontiers has over 221 journals indexed in the Directory of Open Access Journals (DOAJ), over 60 journals listed in PubMed Central (PMC), and over 164 journals listed in Scopus.

The publisher has been on DOAJ's advisory board and council since 2019. Frontiers is also a member of the Open Access Scholarly Publishers Association (OASPA); a participating publisher and supporter of the Initiative for Open Citations; a member of the Committee on Publication Ethics (COPE); and a member of the International Association of Scientific, Technical, and Medical Publishers (STM). As of 2023, Frontiers publishes over 220 academic journals, and following the 2023 release of the Web of Science Group's Journal Citation Reports (JCR 2022) and Scopus' CiteScore, 72 of the journals published by Frontiers have a Journal Impact Factor and 79 journals have a CiteScore.

== Controversies ==
=== Editorial concerns ===
In May 2015, Frontiers Media removed the entire editorial boards of Frontiers in Medicine and Frontiers in Cardiovascular Medicine after editors complained that Frontiers Media staff were "interfering with editorial decisions and violating core principles of medical publishing". In total 31 editors were removed. Following this incident, Nature Publishing Group ended its collaboration with Frontiers with the intent "never to mention again that Nature Publishing Group has some kind of involvement in Frontiers".

In June 2015, Retraction Watch referred to the publisher as one with "a history of badly handled and controversial retractions and publishing decisions".

According to researchers referenced in a 2015 blog post quoted by Allison and James Kaufman in the 2018 book Pseudoscience: The Conspiracy Against Science, "Frontiers has used an in-house journals management software that does not give reviewers the option to recommend the rejection of manuscripts" and the "system is setup to make it almost impossible to reject papers". However, as of 2022, Frontiers maintains that reviewers are given the option to reject papers with specific recommendations.

In 2017, further editors were removed, allegedly for their rejection rate being high. In December 2017, Adam Marcus and Ivan Oransky of Retraction Watch wrote in the magazine Nautilus that the acceptance rate of manuscripts in Frontiers journals was reported to be near 90%.

In 2022, the editors of a special issue with the online journal Frontiers in Research Metrics and Analytics voiced their concerns about the editorial practices at Frontiers, including flaws in the peer review process, unwillingness to discuss these concerns, and forbidding the editors from writing about their concerns in the editorial of the special issue.

In January 2023, Zhejiang Gongshang University (浙江工商大学) in Hangzhou, China announced it would no longer include articles published in Hindawi, MDPI, and Frontiers journals when evaluating researcher performance.

Also in January 2023, Inria released recommendations on "grey-zone publishers", namely Frontiers and MDPI, highlighting stark differences in editorial process between titles owned by Frontiers and other journals in the fields of Computer Science and Mathematics, and urging "extreme vigilance about the quality of articles published by Frontiers."

In 2024, a study highlighted how MDPI, Frontiers, and Hindawi journals had massively increased their publishing of special issue articles, associated with very rapid article acceptances. This has raised concerns over the quality of the Frontiers peer review process.

A 2026 study found that over 20% of papers published by Frontiers in the field of cancer research were likely the product of fraudulent research paper mills.

=== Inclusion in Beall's list ===
In October 2015, Frontiers was added to Beall's List of "Potential, possible, or probable" predatory open-access publishers. The inclusion was met with backlash among some researchers. Daniël Lakens, researcher at the Eindhoven University of Technology, said "articles people have published in Frontiers are no longer judged based on their own quality, but are now seen as less valuable because Frontiers is on Beall's list" and that "[h]aving a single influential individual cast doubt on such a huge journal feels very unfair". At the time, the Committee on Publication Ethics (COPE) said that "there have been vigorous discussions about, and some editors are uncomfortable with, the editorial processes at Frontiers" but that "the processes are declared clearly on the publisher's site and we do not believe there is any attempt to deceive either editors or authors about these processes". Frontiers was a member of COPE; the statement concluded that "we have no concerns about Frontiers being a COPE member and are happy to work with them". For transparency, COPE added that one of Frontiers' employees, Mirjam Curno, sits on COPE's council, although that employee was not involved in the statement.

In July 2016 the maintainer of Beall's List, Jeff Beall, recommended that academics not publish their work in Frontiers journals, stating "the fringe science published in Frontiers journals stigmatizes the honest research submitted and published there", and in October of that year Beall reported that reviewers have called the review process "merely for show".

In September 2016, Frontiers demanded that the university where Beall worked force him to retract his claims. Beall deleted his blacklist in January 2017. Pressure by Frontiers was reported to be a large factor in the controversial shutdown of Beall's List.

=== Controversial articles ===
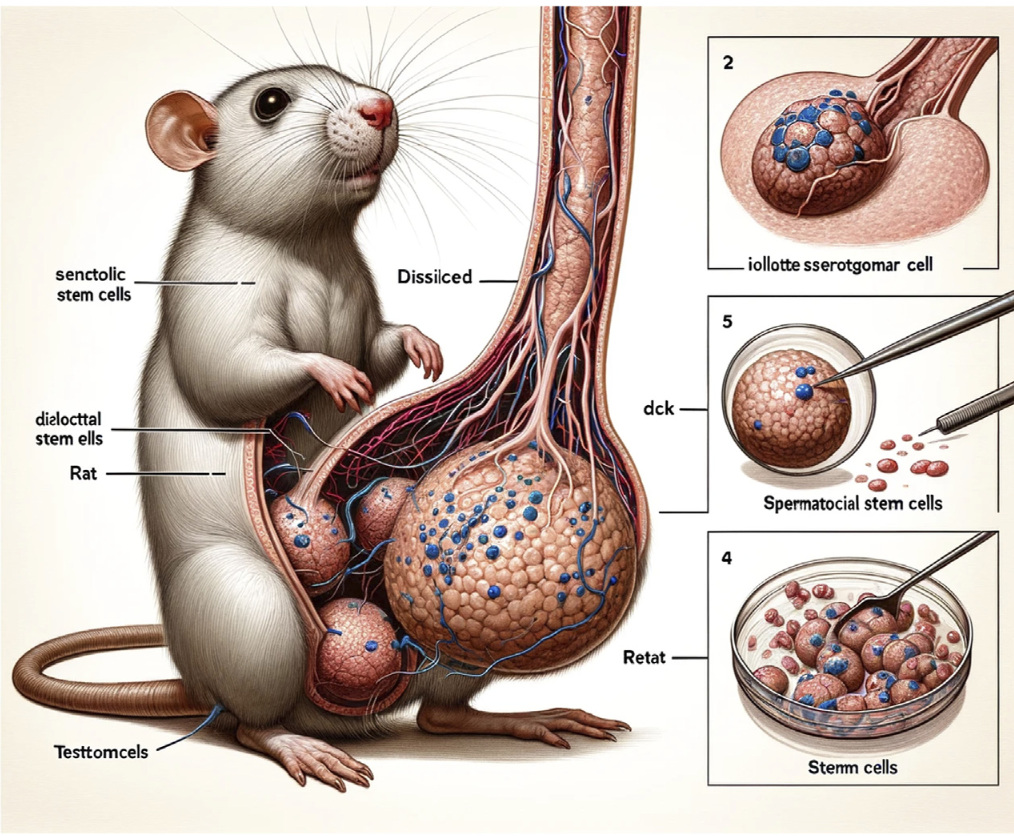
This widely-mocked AI-generated figure was captioned "Spermatogonial stem cells, isolated, purified and cultured from rat testes".

In April 2013, Frontiers in Psychology retracted a controversial article linking climate change denialism and "conspiracist ideation"; the retraction was itself also controversial and led to the resignations of at least three editors.

In late September 2014, Frontiers in Public Health published a controversial article that supported HIV denialism; three days later the publisher issued a statement of concern and announced an investigation into the review process of the article. It was eventually decided that the article would not be retracted but instead was reclassified as an opinion piece. It has since been retracted.

In November 2016, a paper in Frontiers in Public Health linking vaccines to autism was provisionally-accepted, then retracted. Public criticism noted the paper relied on flawed methodology for reliable results, basing its conclusions only on an online questionnaire, filled in by 415 mothers of school children who self-reported whether their children had neurodevelopmental disorders, and their vaccination status.

In 2021, a provisionally accepted controversial paper in Frontiers in Pharmacology on COVID-19 and the use of the antiparasitic drug ivermectin was ultimately rejected by the editors as it contained "unsubstantiated claims and violated the journal's editorial policies". This drew anger from the authors of the paper, who called the move "censorship". Retraction Watch noted that this was not the first time Frontiers provisionally accepted and then rejected a controversial paper.

A study published in Frontiers in Virology in February 2022 said that Moderna had patented a 19 nucleotide genetic sequence uniquely matching a part of the SARS-CoV-2 spike protein three years prior to the pandemic, arguing it was evidence that the virus was manufactured as part of a lab leak conspiracy. The study has been widely derided for its misunderstanding of statistical likelihood, particularly as the 19 nucleotide sequence is not unique to SARS-CoV-2, and is also found in organisms like bacteria and birds. Craig Wilen, an immunobiology professor of the Yale School of Medicine, likened the study to "complete garbage" and a "conspiracy theory" rather than legitimate research.

A now-retracted 2024 paper published in Frontiers in Cell and Developmental Biology was criticized for having figures AI generated with Midjourney, described as featuring "garbled text and a wildly incorrect diagram of a rat penis". Microbiologist and scientific integrity consultant Elisabeth Bik described it as being "a sad example of how scientific journals, editors, and peer reviewers can be naive—or possibly even in the loop—in terms of accepting and publishing AI-generated crap".
