= Frontiers in Sociology =

Peer-reviewed academic journal

- Discipline: Sociology
- Language: English
- Edited by: Hannah Bradby

Publication details
- History: Since 2016
- Publisher: Frontiers (Switzerland)
- Open access: Yes
- License: Creative Commons Attribution
- Impact factor: 2.2 (2024)

Standard abbreviations
- ISO 4: Front. Sociol.

Indexing
- ISSN: 2297-7775
- OCLC no.: 1005774032

Links
- Journal homepage; Online archive

Frontiers in Sociology is a peer-reviewed open-access academic journal covering all aspects of sociology. It was established in 2016 and is published by Frontiers Media, a controversial company that is included in Jeffrey Beall's list of "potential, possible, or probable predatory publishers".

== Abstracting and indexing ==
The journal is abstracted and indexed in Current Contents/Social & Behavioral Sciences, EBSCO databases, and Scopus.

The journal has a 2024 impact factor of 2.2. Since 2016, the journal has a score of 1 in the Norwegian Scientific Index, which "covers the most prestigious and rigorous channels".
