= Michel Goldman =

Belgian medical doctor (born 1955)

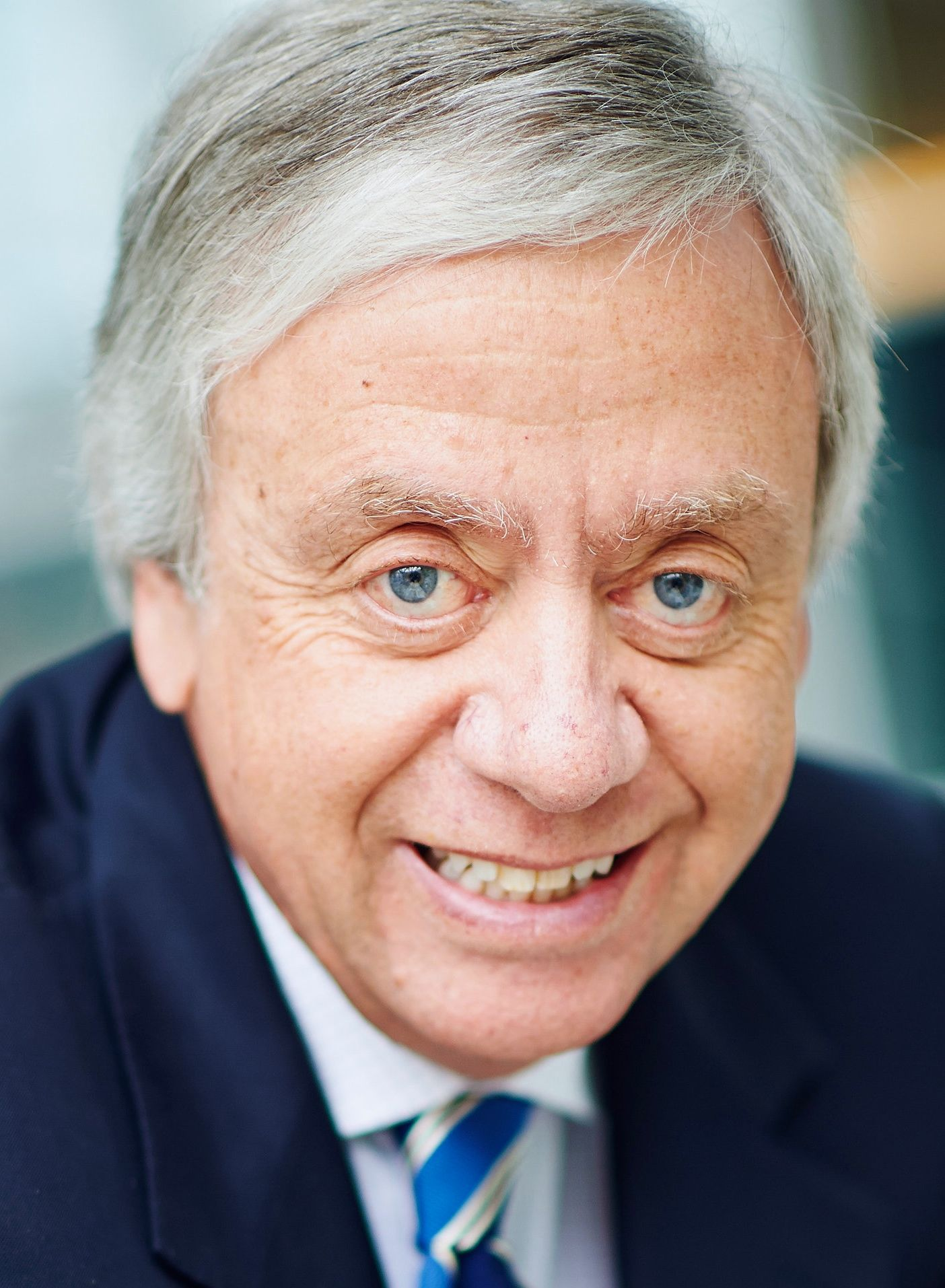
- Goldman in 2014
- Born: 1 January 1955 (age 71); Brussels, Belgium
- Awards: Medical Prize Lucien Steinberg (1992); Quinquiennal Prize of the FNRS, Belgium (2000); Doctor Honoris Causa degree, University of Lille 2 (2007)
- Scientific career
- Fields: Immunology, Pharmaceutical R&D, Research Policy
- Workplaces: Université libre de Bruxelles

Michel Goldman (born 1 January 1955) is a Belgian medical doctor who specialized in internal medicine and immunology.

== Biography ==
Michel Goldman graduated as a medical doctor (1978) from the Université libre de Bruxelles (ULB), Belgium, and received his PhD in medical sciences (1981) from Université de Genève, Switzerland. He is board certified in internal medicine (1984) and clinical biology (1993).

From 1990 to 2008, he heads the Department of Immunology-Hematology-Transfusion at Erasmus Hospital in Brussels, and from 2004 to 2009 serves as the first Director of the Institute for Medical Immunology built on the Charleroi campus of ULB, with the support of GSKBiologicals and the Walloon Region.

In 2009, Michel Goldman becomes the first executive director of the Innovative Medicines Initiative (IMI) a joint undertaking between the European Commission and the European Federation of Pharmaceutical Industries and Associations. Managing a budget of €2 billion, he has been responsible for the launch of 59 public-private consortia in areas of major importance, including antimicrobial resistance, Alzheimer's dementia, cancer, diabetes, immuno-inflammatory disorders, autism, chronic pulmonary diseases and drug safety.

Michel Goldman is Professor Emeritus in Immunology at ULB. He is a member of the Board of the Tuberculosis Vaccine Initiative, and of the Board of the Friends of the Global Fund Europe.

Starting from September 2015, Michel Goldman is leading the Institute for Interdisciplinary Innovation in Healthcare (I3h), a ULB centre that has the mission of fostering research, education and outreach networks for the benefit of patients and other stakeholders.

In January 2016 Michel Goldman has been appointed as the Field Chief Editor of Frontiers in Medicine.

== Awards and recognition ==
- 1992: Medical Prize Lucien Steinberg (shared with Pr. Peter Piot)
- 1999: Francqui Chair at the University of Namur
- 2000: Quinquiennal Prize of the Belgian National Fund for Scientific Research for Clinical Sciences
- 2001: Spinoza Chair at the University of Amsterdam
- 2003: Francqui Chair at the University of Liège
- 2006: Highly Cited Scientist recognition by the Thomson Institute for Scientific Information
- 2007: Doctor Honoris Causa degree of the University of Lille 2

== Selected publications ==
=== Biomedical Research ===
- Goldman, M; Rose, LM; Hochmann, A; Lambert, PH (1982). "Deposition of idiotype-anti-idiotype immune complexes in renal glomeruli after polyclonal B cell activation". Journal of Experimental Medicine. 155 (5): 1385–1399. doi:10.1084/jem.155.5.1385. PMC 2186687. PMID 7040591.
- Cogan, E; Schandené, L; Crusiaux, A; Cochaux, P; Velu, T; Goldman, M (1994). "Clonal proliferation of type 2 helper T cells in a man with the hypereosinophilic syndrome". New England Journal of Medicine. 330 (8): 535–538. doi:10.1056/nejm199402243300804. hdl:2013/ULB-DIPOT:oai:dipot.ulb.ac.be:2013/81828. PMID 8302319.
- Marchant, A.; Devière, J; Byl, B; De Groot, D; Vincent, JL; Goldman, M. (1994). "Interleukin-10 production during septicaemia". Lancet. 343 (8899): 707–708. doi:10.1016/s0140-6736(94)91584-9. PMID 7907683. S2CID 22985772.
- Tassignon, J; Ismaili, J; Le Moine, A; Van Laethem, F; Leo, O; Vandevelde, M; Goldman, M (1999). "Azodicarbonamide inhibits T cell responses in vitro and in vivo". Nature Medicine. 5 (8): 947–950. doi:10.1038/11392. PMID 10426321. S2CID 27599107.
- Goldman, M; Le Moine, A; Braun, M; Flamand, V; Abramowicz, D (2001). "A role for eosinophils in transplant rejection". Trends in Immunology. 22 (5): 247–251. doi:10.1016/s1471-4906(01)01893-2. PMID 11323281.
- Le Moine, A; Goldman, M (2003). "Non-classical pathways of cell-mediated allograft rejection: new challenges for tolerance induction ?". American Journal of Transplantation. 3 (2): 101–106. doi:10.1034/j.1600-6143.2002.00026.x. PMID 12603204.
- Wraith, D; Goldman, M; Lambert, PH (2003). "Vaccines and autoimmunity: what is the evidence ?". Lancet. 362 (9396): 1659–1666. doi:10.1016/s0140-6736(03)14802-7. PMID 14630450. S2CID 3022962.
- Goriely, S; Van Lint, C; Dadkah, R; Libin, M; De Wit, D; Demonte, D; Willems, F; Goldman, M (2004). "A defect in nucleosome remodeling prevents IL-12(p35) gene transcription in neonatal dendritic cells". Journal of Experimental Medicine. 199 (7): 1011–1016. doi:10.1084/jem.20031272. PMC 2211877. PMID 15051764.
- Goriely, S; Neurath, MF; Goldman, M (2008). "How microorganisms tip the balance between interleukin-12 family members". Nature Reviews Immunology. 8 (1): 82–86. doi:10.1038/nri2225. PMID 18084185. S2CID 32609431.
- Garçon, N; Goldman, M (2009). "Boosting vaccine power". Scientific American. 301 (4): 72–79. Bibcode:2009SciAm.301d..72G. doi:10.1038/scientificamerican1009-72. PMID 19780455.

=== Research and innovation policy ===
- Goldman, M (2012). "Public-private partnerships need honest brokering". Nature Medicine. 18 (3): 341. doi:10.1038/nm0312-341. PMID 22395691.
- Goldman, M (2013). "New frontiers for collaborative research". Science Translational Medicine. 5 (216): 216. doi:10.1126/scitranslmed.3007990. PMID 24353157. S2CID 34403570.
- Goldman, M; Seigneuret, N; Eichler, H.-G. (2014). "The Innovative Medicines Initiative: An engine for regulatory science". Nature Reviews Drug Discovery. 14 (1): 1–2. doi:10.1038/nrd4520. PMID 25503331. S2CID 205478670.
- Murphy, D; Goldman, M; Loth, E; Spooren, W (2014). "Public-private partnership: a new engine for translational research in neurosciences". Neuron. 84 (3): 533–536. doi:10.1016/j.neuron.2014.10.006. PMID 25442930.
- Joanette, Y; Hirsch, E; Goldman (2014). "The global fight against dementia". Science Translational Medicine. 6 (267): 267. doi:10.1126/scitranslmed.aaa4486. PMID 25520393.
- Lim, MD; Brumfield, MA; Goldman, M (2015). "Philanthropies as partners for drug development in public-private partnerships". Journal of Medicines Development Sciences. 1. doi:10.18063/JMDS.2015.01.002. S2CID 70881077.
- Gunn, M; Lim, M; Cross, D; Goldman, M (2015). "Public-private partnership for health innovation: time to assess research performance". Nature Biotechnology. 33 (8): 811–812. doi:10.1038/nbt.3305. PMID 26252134. S2CID 19884653.
