= Naomi Habib =

Israeli computational neuroscientist

- נעמי חביב
- Education: Hebrew University of Jerusalem
- Scientific career
- Fields: Computational neuroscience
- Workplaces: Hebrew University of Jerusalem
- Doctoral advisor: Nir Friedman; Hanah Margalit

Naomi Habib (Hebrew: נעמי חביב) is an Israeli computational neuroscientist who researches cognitive decline and resilience. She has worked as the Goren-Khazzam Lecturer in Brain Sciences and an assistant professor at the Hebrew University of Jerusalem since 2018.

== Life ==
Habib earned a Ph.D. in computational biology from the Hebrew University of Jerusalem in 2012. Her doctoral advisers were Nir Friedman and Hanah Margalit. Her dissertation was titled Computational Comparative Study of Transcriptional Regulation in Eukaryotes. She conducted a postdoctoral fellowship at the Broad Institute under Feng Zhang and Aviv Regev. She was researching the development of a single nucleus RNA-sequencing technology.

Habib is a computational neuroscientist who researches cognitive decline and resilience. She specializes in computational biology, genomics, and genome engineering. In August 2018, she returned to the Hebrew University of Jerusalem as the Gorem-Khazzam Lecturer in Brain Sciences and an assistant professor at the Edmond and Lily Safra Center for Brain Sciences. Her research includes Alzheimer's disease pathology.
