= Frontiers in Public Health =

- Language: English
- Edited by: Paolo Vineis

Publication details
- History: 2013–present
- Publisher: Frontiers Media

Standard abbreviations
- ISO 4: Front. Public Health

Indexing
- ISSN: 2296-2565 (print); 2296-2565 (web)

Frontiers in Public Health is a multidisciplinary open-access journal that is published online by Frontiers Media. The journal covers “occupational, mental and reproductive health, medicine and social policy, epidemiology, rehabilitation, obesity, family and social issues, quality of life and public health education and promotion.” It is based in Switzerland.

== Controversy ==
In late September 2014, Frontiers in Public Health published a controversial article that supported HIV denialism; three days later the publisher issued a statement of concern and announced an investigation into the review process of the article. It was eventually decided that the article would not be retracted but instead was reclassified as an opinion piece. It has since been retracted.

In June 2016, Frontiers in Public Health published a chemtrail conspiracy theory paper. It was later retracted.

In November 2016, a paper in Frontiers in Public Health linking vaccines to autism was provisionally-accepted, then retracted. Public criticism noted the paper relied on flawed methodology for reliable results, basing its conclusions only on an online questionnaire, filled in by 415 mothers of school children who self-reported whether their children had neurodevelopmental disorders, and their vaccination status.
