= Sabine Kastner =

German-born American cognitive neuroscientist

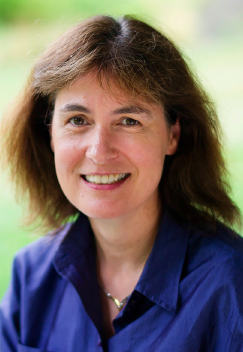
- Born: January 21, 1964 (age 62); Hannover, Germany
- Citizenship: German, American
- Education: Heinrich Heine University Düsseldorf; Georg August University of Göttingen
- Organization: Princeton University
- Known for: Cognitive neuroscience
- Website: scholar.princeton.edu/napl

Sabine Kastner is a German-born American cognitive neuroscientist. She is professor of psychology at the Princeton Neuroscience Institute at Princeton University. She also holds a visiting scientist appointment at the University of California at Berkeley.

She is an elected member of the Society for Experimental Psychology (2020), American Academy of Arts & Sciences (2022), National Academy of Sciences Leopoldina, Germany (2021), the International Neuropsychology Symposium (2016), and a Fellow of the American Psychological Society (2010). She received the Young Investigator Award of the Cognitive Neuroscience Society (2005), the Society for Neuroscience Award for Education in Neuroscience (2019), and the George A. Miller Prize in Cognitive Neuroscience.

== Biography ==
=== Early life and education ===
Kastner grew up in Hannover, Germany, where she attended the Wilhelm-Raabe-Gymnasium. She was the first in her family to earn a high school diploma. Ranking in the top 1% of high school students nationwide earned her a fellowship in the German National Scholarship Foundation. Kastner initially studied history and philosophy at the Georg-August-University in Göttingen (Germany). After earning the equivalent of a BA degree, Kastner decided to pursue degrees in medicine and neuroscience to prepare her for a career in science, and she studied at Georg-August-University (Göttingen, Germany), Heinrich-Heine-University (Düsseldorf, Germany), the Institute of Neurology (London, U.K.) and the Max-Planck-Institute for Biophysical Chemistry (Göttingen, Germany).

=== Academic career ===
Kastner was trained as a vision scientist and primate electrophysiologist by Otto Creutzfeldt and studied the neural basis of a color illusion as a PhD student at the Max-Planck-Institute for Biophysical Chemistry. She then became interested in cognition, studying neural correlates of visual search in the monkey visual system. Kastner then joined Leslie Ungerleider’s laboratory at the National Institute of Mental Health to receive training in functional magnetic resonance imaging. Together with Robert Desimone, she pioneered translating mechanistic principles from primate physiology into functional brain imaging studies in humans. This approach laid the groundwork for an understanding of attention function in the human brain.

In her laboratory at Princeton University, Kastner established the functional architecture of the attention network and defined functional principles for space-, feature and object-based attention, also extending them to natural vision. She was the first to show that cognitive mechanisms were not confined to the neocortex, but also operated in the thalamus, a deep and ‘old’ brain structure. In addition, she has studied various aspects of visual perception in the healthy, adult primate brain as well as in patients with brain lesions and during development. Combining functional brain imaging with intracranial electrophysiology, Kastner studies the human and non-human primate brain in direct comparison with the goal to establish functional principles underlying cognition that can be linked to behavior at the level of cognitive large-scale networks.

=== Honors ===
2026 Kastner was elected to the National Academy of Sciences.

=== Service ===
Kastner is the Editor-in-Chief of The Journal of Neuroscience and specialty chief editor of the children's open access science journal Frontiers for Young Minds. She has served as Editor-in-Chief of Progress in Neurobiology (2018-2022). She previously served as reviewing and senior editor at the Journal of Neuroscience, eLife, Neuropsychologia and NeuroImage and on the advisory boards for brainfacts.org and eNeuro.

Kastner served for the Society for Neuroscience as a member of the publications committee and is presently a member of the finance committee.

Kastner serves as adviser to the German Council of Science and Humanities for their excellence strategy program.

=== Public education and outreach ===
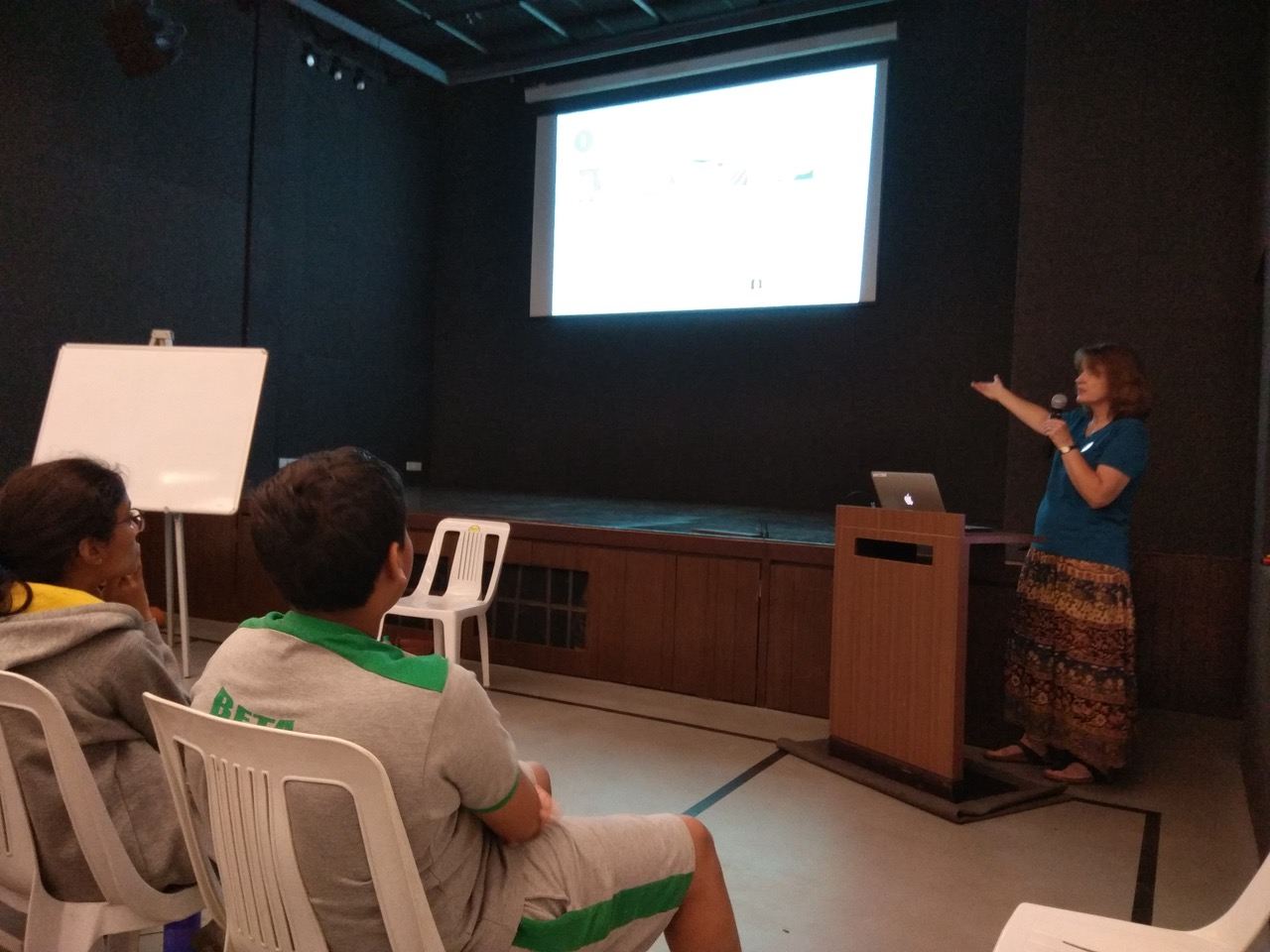
Dr. Kastner at Mumbai outreach

Kastner is active in public outreach activities such as fostering the careers of young women in science, promoting neuroscience in schools and public education and exploring the intersection of visual neuroscience and art.

=== Distinguished Lectures ===
- George A. Miller Lecture, Cognitive Neuroscience Society, 2023
- Keynote Lecture, 22nd International Conference on Biomagnetism, Birmingham, UK, 2022
- Special Lecture, Society for Neurosience Annual Meeting, San Diego, 2018
- Attneave Lecture, University of Oregon, 2018
- Inaugural Marianne Fillenz Lecture, Department of Anatomy & Physiology, University of Oxford, 2018
- Keynote Lecture, Vision Sciences Society meeting, St. Petersburg, 2016
- Creutzfeldt Lecture, 11th Meeting of the German Neuroscience Society, Göttingen, Germany, 2015
- Key Note Lecture, Human Brain Mapping, Honolulu, 2015
- Distinguished Fellow & SAGE Lecture, Sage Center for the Study of the Mind, Santa Barbara, 2014
- Donders Lecture, Donders Institute, Nijmwegen, Netherlands, 2014
- 2nd Homewood Brain and Cognition Lecture, Johns Hopkins University, Baltimore, 2012
- 4th Annual CCSN Invited Lecture, Washington University in St. Louis, 2012

== Personal life ==
Kastner has two children and is married to the American neuroscientist and novelist Michael Graziano.
