= Hermona Soreq =

Israeli biologist

- חרמונה שורק
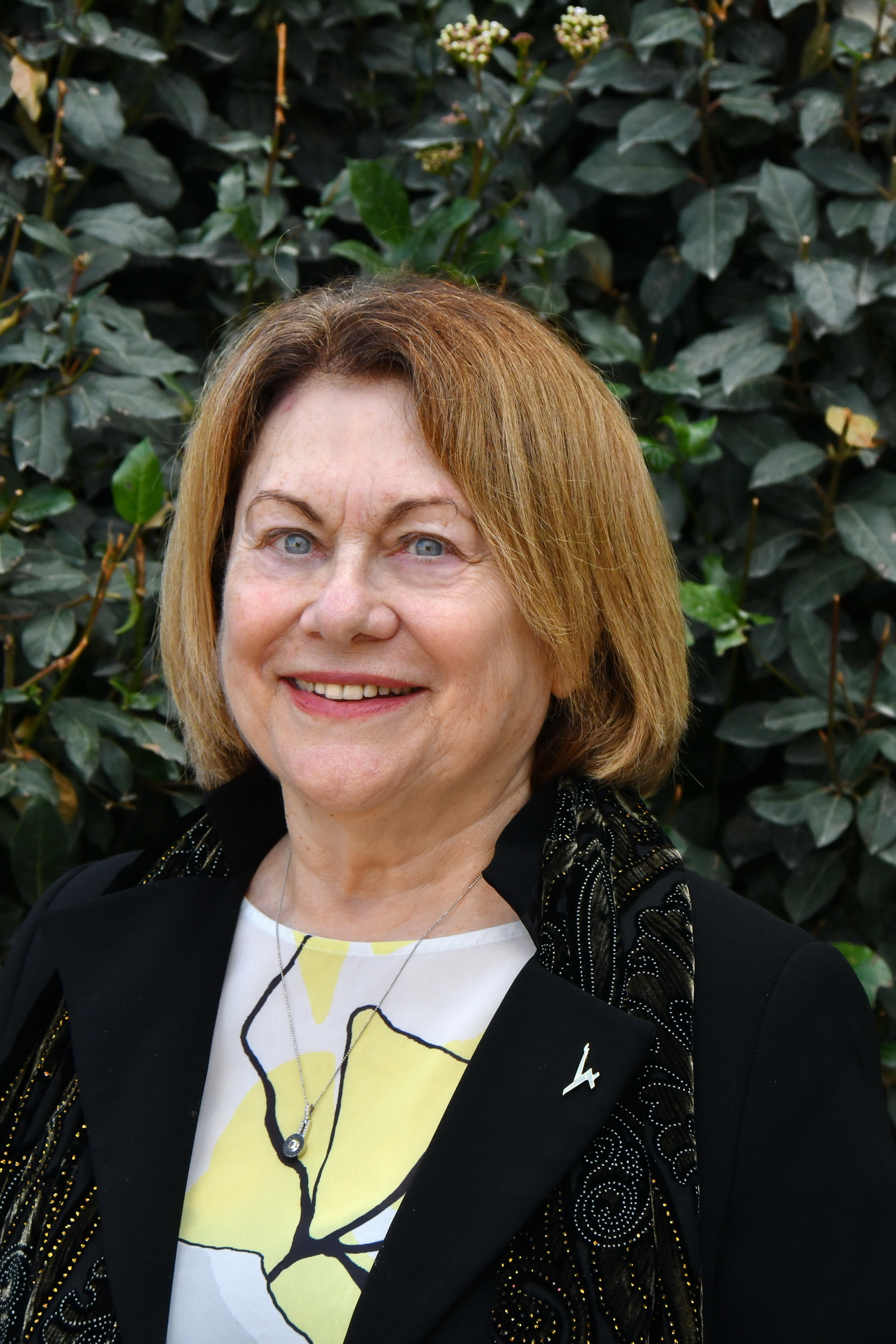
- Born: Hermona Even; April 3, 1947 (age 79); Tel Aviv, Israel
- Education: The Hebrew University of Jerusalem; Tel-Aviv University; Weizmann Institute of Science
- Known for: Research in microRNAs (miRs) and other non-coding RNA regulators of gene expression focusing on acetylcholine(ACh)-related processes
- Scientific career
- Fields: Molecular Neuroscience
- Workplaces: The Hebrew University of Jerusalem

Hermona Soreq (Hebrew: חרמונה שורק) is an Israeli professor of Molecular Neuroscience at The Hebrew University of Jerusalem. She is best known for her work on the signaling of acetylcholine and its relevance in stress responses and neurodegenerative diseases such as Parkinson's and Alzheimer's.

== Biography ==
Soreq (née Even) was born in Tel-Aviv. She completed her B.Sc. in biochemistry and microbiology at the Hebrew University, M.Sc. in biochemistry from Tel-Aviv University and Ph.D. in biochemistry from the Weizmann Institute in 1976. From 1977 to 1979, she was a post-doctoral Fogarty fellow, in molecular cell biology, at the Rockefeller University, New York.

== Scientific career ==
Soreq started her scientific career in the Weizmann Institute, where she served as Senior Scientist and then Associate Professor (1979-1986). In 1986 she became an Associate Professor of molecular biology and set up her laboratory in the Department of Biological Chemistry at the Hebrew University of Jerusalem. In 1989 she gained her professorship there. She has run her lab there, ever-since. She served as the head of the Silberman Institute of Life Sciences at the Hebrew University (1995-2000). In 2000 she was elected as President of the Israeli Society of Biochemistry and Molecular Biology, and served as such till 2002. In 2005 she was elected to serve a term of 3 years as the first female Dean of the Hebrew University's Faculty of Science.

Soreq is Charlotte Schlesinger Professor of Molecular Neuroscience at the Silberman Institute for Life Sciences and a founding member of the Hebrew University’s Edmond and Lily Safra Center for Brain Sciences, where she heads the Soreq group. Her major research interests are MicroRNAs (miRs) and other non-coding RNA regulators of gene expression, including transfer RNA fragments (tRFs). Soreq combines advanced sequencing technologies with computational neuroscience and transgenic engineering tools to investigate miR and tRF functions in the healthy and diseased brain and body, with a focus on acetylcholine (ACh)-related processes. Her studies found primate-specific "CholinomiR" silencers of multiple genes that compete with each other on suppressing their targets and discovered cholinergic brain-to-body regulation of anxiety and inflammation. In human volunteers, Soreq found cholinergic-associated pulse increases under fear of terror; and identified massive CholinomiRs decline in Alzheimer’s brains, which accompanies changes in long non-coding RNAs and points at Statins intervention with the onset of Parkinson’s disease and modifications in pseudogenes expression. In engineered mice, Soreq studies CholinomiR and CholinotRF responders to stress, epilepsy, inflammation and ischemic stroke; and found liver fattening, trait anxiety, blood pressure and inflammation under inherited interference with acetylcholinesterase (AChE)-targeting CholinomiRs. Soreq has found CholinomiR differences between brains of men and women with schizophrenia and bipolar disorder, and CholinomiRs decline accompanied by CholinotRF increases in blood cells from stroke patients; together, her work leads to precision medicine-driven prevention and/or intervention with diseases involving impaired ACh signaling.

=== Major landmarks of the Soreq group in the cholinergic field ===
- MiR-132 regulation of cholinergic signaling: Soreq found miR-132 suppression of AChE levels and activities, controlling neuro-immune signaling from brain to body, with a pronounced impact on liver hyperlipidemia.
- CholinomiRs-mediated suppression of stress reactions: miR-211 was identified as attenuator of epileptic seizures and its sequence homologue miR-204 was associated with stereotypic behavior; human carriers of a single nucleotide polymorphism (SNP) that modifies miR-608-binding site in AChE mRNA showed elevated brain AChE, blood pressure and inflammation but not PTSD; whereas the AChE-targeting miR-125b was shown to be schizophrenia-modulated.
- CholinomiRs-associated changes in stroke, cardiac and inflammatory bowel disease: Together with clinician collaborators, Soreq observed serum AChE changes that predict recovery and survival from ischemic stroke; drastic miR-132 increases in inflamed, but not non-inflamed intestinal biopsies, and risk of non-survival in cardiac patients with low AChE levels. Surprisingly, in stroke patients’ blood cholinomiRs are exchanged with cholino-targeted transfer RNA fragments.
- Finding cholinergic-mediated RNA metabolism impairments in neurodegenerating brains: Soreq found the decline in Alzheimer’s cholinergic neurons and Parkinson’s disease brains to be accompanied by RNA metabolism-related brain damages in human donors and cholinergic-deprived mice.
- Implicating cholinergic mechanisms to our stress-related daily life: The impact of stress-induced processes on our daily life in 2021 Israel is notably increasing the risk of disease; in a collaborative Big-Data study with clinical experts, Soreq and colleagues combined machine learning with patient serum tests which linked anxiety and metabolism regulating miRs. Soreq thus raised research discussion of cholinergic-regulating small RNAs at both the basic and biomedical aspects.

She is the author of over 280 peer-reviewed journal articles and 8 books

== Awards and honors ==
Soreq served on the boards of the Hebrew University, the Technion (Israel Institute of Technology) and Yissum (the Research Development Company of the Hebrew University). She was also an Adjunct Research professor at the Arizona State University Biodesign Institute. Her awards and honors include:

- 2005: Landau Prize for Biomedical Research
- 2008: Kaye Prize for Innovative research, The Hebrew University
- 2009: The Lise Meitner Alexander von Humboldt Foundation Award, Germany
- 2009: Visiting Miller Professorship, University of California, Berkeley
- 2013: National Center of Excellence (I-Core) on Trauma, member of Scientific Management
- 2013: Advanced ERC Research Award
- 2015: The Rappaport Prize for Bio-Medical Research, Israel
- 2017: ILANIT-Katzir Prize for exceptional achievements in the Life Sciences, Israel
- 2022: The EMET Prize. Sponsored by the A.M.N. Foundation for the Advancement of Science, Art and Culture in Israel, under the auspices of and in cooperation with the Prime Minister of Israel
- Honorary Doctorates from the University of Erlangen, Nűremberg, Germany (2007), Ben-Gurion University of the Negev, Israel (2007) and the University of Stockholm, Sweden, (1996)

== Leading Publications ==
- Loewenstein-Lichtenstein Y, Schwarz M, Glick D, Nørgaard-Pedersen B, Zakut H, Soreq H (October 1995). "Genetic predisposition to adverse consequences of anti-cholinesterases in 'atypical' BCHE carriers". Nat Med. 1 (10): 1082–5. doi:10.1038/nm1095-1082. PMID 7489367. S2CID 1906128.
- Friedman A, Kaufer D, Shemer J, Hendler I, Soreq H, Tur-Kaspa I (December 1996). "Pyridostigmine brain penetration under stress enhances neuronal excitability and induces early immediate transcriptional response". Nat Med. 2 (12): 1382–5. Bibcode:1996NatMe...2.1382F. doi:10.1038/nm1296-1382. PMID 8946841. S2CID 7955488.
- Kaufer D, Friedman A, Seidman S, Soreq H (May 1998). "Acute stress facilitates long-lasting changes in cholinergic gene expression". Nature. 393 (6683): 373–7. Bibcode:1998Natur.393..373K. doi:10.1038/30741. PMID 9620801. S2CID 4409716. Note (Erratum: doi:10.1038/nature16180, PMID 26605528). Accompanied by: Sapolsky RM (May 1998). "The stress of Gulf War syndrome". Nature. 393 (6683): 308–9. doi:10.1038/30606. PMID 9620793. S2CID 4321563.
- Meshorer E, Erb C, Gazit R, Pavlovsky L, Kaufer D, Friedman A, Glick D, Ben-Arie N, Soreq H (January 2002). "Alternative splicing and neuritic mRNA translocation under long-term neuronal hypersensitivity". Science. 295 (5554): 508–12. Bibcode:2002Sci...295..508M. doi:10.1126/science.1066752. PMID 11799248. S2CID 8773254.
- Shaked I, Meerson A, Wolf Y, Avni R, Greenberg D, Gilboa-Geffen A, Soreq H (December 2009). "MicroRNA-132 potentiates cholinergic anti-inflammatory signaling by targeting acetylcholinesterase". Immunity. 31 (6): 965–73. doi:10.1016/j.immuni.2009.09.019. PMID 20005135.
- Barbash S, Shifman S, Soreq H (May 2014). "Global coevolution of human microRNAs and their target genes". Mol Biol Evol. 31 (5): 1237–47. doi:10.1093/molbev/msu090. PMID 24600049.
- Hanin G, Yayon N, Tzur Y, Haviv R, Bennett ER, Udi S, Krishnamoorthy YR, Kotsiliti E, Zangen R, Efron B, Tam J, Pappo O, Shteyer E, Pikarsky E, Heikenwalder M, Greenberg DS, Soreq H (June 2018). "miRNA-132 induces hepatic steatosis and hyperlipidaemia by synergistic multitarget suppression". Gut. 67 (6): 1124–1134. doi:10.1136/gutjnl-2016-312869. PMC 5969364. PMID 28381526.
- Lobentanzer S, Hanin G, Klein J, Soreq H (October 2019). "Integrative Transcriptomics Reveals Sexually Dimorphic Control of the Cholinergic/Neurokine Interface in Schizophrenia and Bipolar Disorder". Cell Rep. 29 (3): 764–777.e5. doi:10.1016/j.celrep.2019.09.017. PMC 6899527. PMID 31618642.
- Winek K, Lobentanzer S, Nadorp B, Dubnov S, Dames C, Jagdmann S, Moshitzky G, Hotter B, Meisel C, Greenberg DS, Shifman S, Klein J, Shenhar-Tsarfaty S, Meisel A, Soreq H (December 2020). "Transfer RNA fragments replace microRNA regulators of the cholinergic poststroke immune blockade". Proc Natl Acad Sci U S A. 117 (51): 32606–32616. Bibcode:2020PNAS..11732606W. doi:10.1073/pnas.2013542117. PMC 7768686. PMID 33288717.
