= Frontiers in Medicine =

- Discipline: Medicine
- Language: English
- Edited by: Michel Goldman

Publication details
- History: 2014–present
- Publisher: Frontiers Media (Switzerland)
- Frequency: Upon acceptance
- Open access: Yes
- License: Creative Commons Attribution
- Impact factor: 5.091 (2020)

Standard abbreviations
- ISO 4: Front. Med. (Lausanne)

Indexing
- ISSN: 2296-858X
- LCCN: 2014243749
- OCLC no.: 894041183

Links
- Journal homepage; Online archive

Frontiers in Medicine is a peer-reviewed open access medical journal covering all aspects of medicine in 18 sections. It was established in 2014 and is published by Frontiers Media. The editor-in-chief is Michel Goldman (Institute for Interdisciplinary Innovation in healthcare).

== Abstracting and indexing ==
The journal is abstracted and indexed in PubMed and Scopus. According to the Journal Citation Reports, the journal has a 2020 impact factor of 5.091.
