= Idan Segev =

Israeli neuroscientist

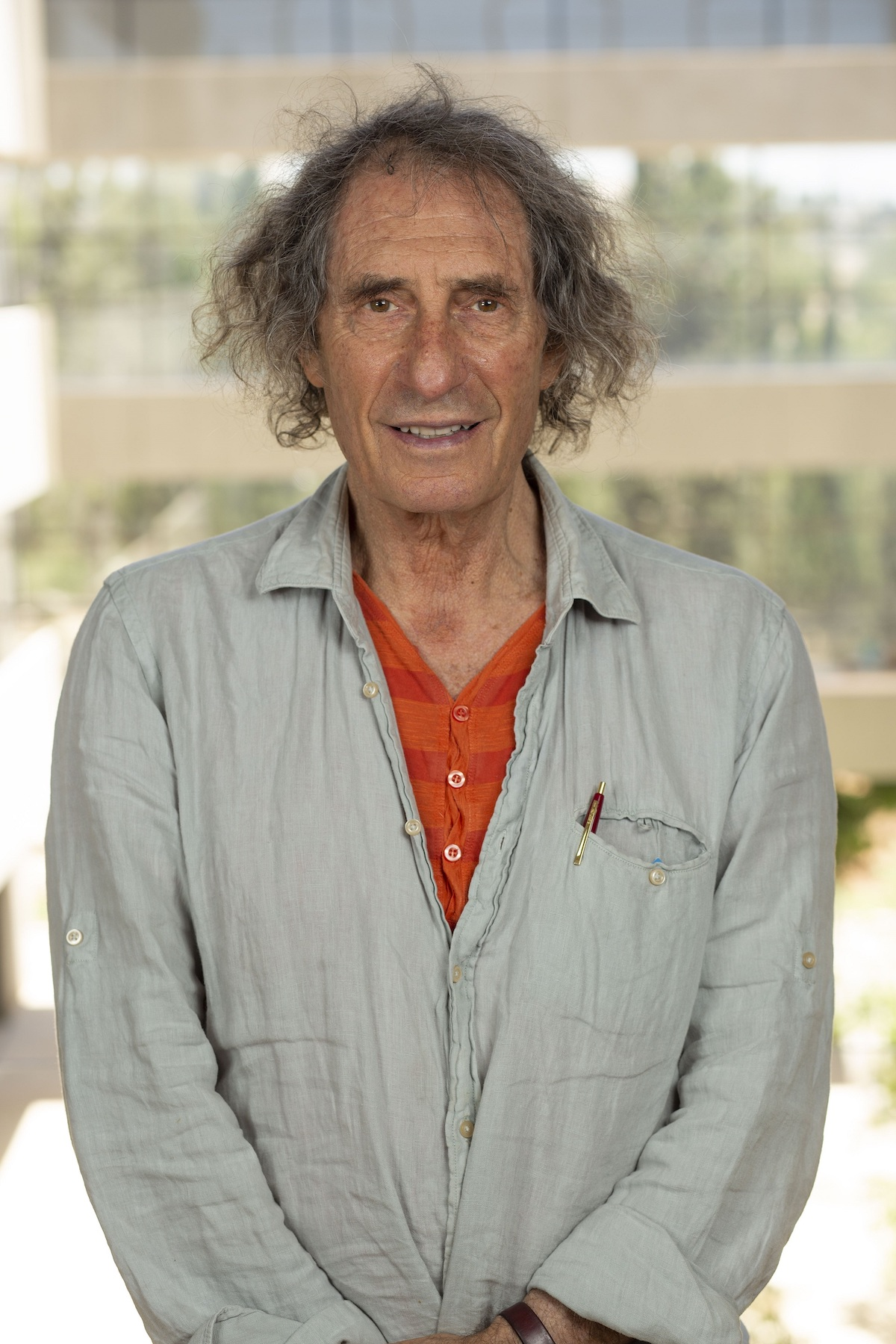
- Born: November 11, 1949; London, United Kingdom
- Education: Hebrew University of Jerusalem
- Known for: Dendritic modeling, Single neuron computation
- Spouse: Vered Aviv
- Awards: Casella Prize in memory of Italian neurophysiologist Cesare Casella from Almo Collegio Borromeo (2019), COMBINE (Collaborative Opportunities for Multidisciplinary, Bold and Innovative Neuroscience) award (2020)
- Scientific career
- Fields: Computational neuroscience
- Workplaces: Hebrew University of Jerusalem
- Doctoral advisor: Itzchak Parnas, Amnon Pazy

Idan Segev (born November 11, 1949) is an Israeli brain researcher and professor of computational neuroscience at the Edmond and Lily Safra Center for Brain Sciences (ELSC) of the Hebrew University of Jerusalem, where he also serves as head of the Department of Neurobiology and the Interdisciplinary Center for Neural Computation (ICNC). He is a senior partner in the Swiss Blue Brain Project and EU Human Brain Project.

== Early life and education ==
Idan Segev was born in London. His mother, Shoshana Ashman-Segev, was a piano teacher, writer and journalist. His father, Victor Segev, was a journalist and artist. His younger brother is a professor at Ben-Gurion University of the Negev. As a child he lived for several years in Paris. Later the family moved to Jerusalem, where he attended Leyada, the Hebrew University Secondary School. Segev is married to Vered, an artist and former dean of the Jerusalem Academy of Music and Dance. They have twin daughters.

In 1970, Segev began undergraduate studies in mathematics and biology at the Hebrew University of Jerusalem. He completed a master's degree at the same institution and commenced his doctoral studies in 1976. Between 1982 and 1985, Segev completed postdoctoral studies at the National Institutes of Health under the guidance of Wilfrid Rall, where he developed mathematical models of electrical signal flow in nerve cells and their dendritic trees.

== Career ==
In 1985, Segev joined the Hebrew University's Institute of Life Sciences as a researcher, and has been affiliated with the Edmond and Lily Safra Center for Brain Sciences since 2009. Since 2017, Segev has headed the Patrick Drahi Laboratory for Neural Computation. His research focuses on the neuronal networks of the mammalian and human brain, in an attempt to answer the question, "what differentiates the human brain from that of other animals?" Segev suggests that it is not only the size or number of brain cells but the details of their structure and the specific interconnectivity between them.

Segev has been studying the relationship between the brain and art. Following his participation in the Art of the Brain Conference at Kibbutz Kabri in 2004, he co-edited a collection of essays on the subject illustrated with brain-inspired etchings by leading Israeli artists.

In 2005, he joined the Blue Brain Project, working with Henry Markram of the École Polytechnique Fédérale de Lausanne (EPFL) to develop detailed digital reconstructions and simulations of the mammalian brain.

In 2013, he also joined the EU Human Brain Project, which combines theoretical, experimental, and clinical research to advance understanding of the healthy and diseased brain.

In 2015, it was reported that an international team of scientists including Segev had created the first detailed, computerized representation of brain tissue. After 20 years of biological experiments at EPFL and institutes in Israel, Hungary, the United States China, Sweden and the UK, the team presented the digital reconstruction of the region in a rat's brain that responds to touch (somatosensory system). This reconstructed simulated circuit enabled experiments that could not be performed using biological tissue.

In 2017, Segev and his team presented the first direct evidence that human neocortical neurons have distinct membrane properties that enhance their signal processing capabilities.

In 2018, at a 3-day conference at the newly opened Edmond and Lily Safra Center for Brain Sciences attended by brain researchers from around the world, Segev said that humanity was in the middle of its biggest revolution, "the machine learning revolution", which he described as bigger than the industrial revolution or the information revolution.

Almo Collegio Borromeo of Pavia awarded Segev the Casella Prize in 2019, and shared the 2020 COMBINE (Collaborative Opportunities for Multidisciplinary, Bold and Innovative Neuroscience) award together with five colleagues.

== Published works ==
=== Books ===
- Methods in Neuronal Modeling: From Synapses to Networks (1989)
- Methods in Neuronal Modeling: From Ions to Networks (1998)
- The Theoretical Foundation of Dendritic Function: The Collected Papers of Wilfrid Rall with Commentaries (2003)
- Augmenting Cognition (2011)
- Brain and art(editor) (2014)
- Perspectives on Consciousness: Inquiries into Subjective Experience across Disciples (editor) (2025)
