= Interdisciplinary Center for Neural Computation =

Israeli research centre

The Interdisciplinary Center for Neural Computation
- המרכז הבינתחומי לחישוביות עצבית
- Type: Public
- Established: 1992
- Location: Jerusalem, Israel
- Campus: Giva'at Ram(Edmond J. Safra)
- Nickname: ICNC
- Website: icnc.huji.ac.il

The Interdisciplinary Center for Neural Computation (ICNC) (Hebrew: המרכז הבינתחומי לחישוביות עצבית) is a research center at the Hebrew University of Jerusalem, Israel. Established in 1992, it brings together research in neurobiology, physics, computer science and psychology to investigate the computational processes of the nervous system.

The center has 26 faculty members, and facilities for studying and modeling the nervous system at various levels, including single neuron computation, signal processing in small and large cortical networks, and on system and behavioral levels.

The ICNC groups work together, using experimental and theoretical approaches ranging from molecular techniques, in vitro intracellular using DIC video microscopy and imaging methods with voltage-dependent dyes; in vivo multi-unit recordings in behaving animals and imaging techniques using fMRI. Theoretical approaches include cable and compartmental modeling, information and learning theory, statistical mechanics and techniques from signal processing theory.

A number of research centers in Europe, USA and Japan are now following the model established by the ICNC, including the Institute for Neuroinformatics (ETH/Univ. Zürich), Laboratories de Neurophysique (Univ. Paris V, Paris), the Gatsby Computational Neuroscience Unit (UCL, London), each of whom have sent missions to ICNC. The ICNC faculty members are intensely involved in teaching the 60 Ph.D. students at the “Ph.D. program for Neural Computation” and in supervising the Ph.D. theses of a total of 120 Ph.D. students (50% female). ICNC faculty co-founded, co-direct and teach at the yearly “EC advanced course in Computational Neuroscience” (Crete/Greece, Trieste/Italy and Obidos/ Portugal). The ICNC is well experienced in hosting international post-docs, sabbatical fellows and short-term visitors. The flow of 32 visitors (mostly at their Ph.D. and early post-doc training period) during the first 15 months of the EU grant under the 5th framework is a demonstration for the attractiveness of the ICNC facility to European users.

== Ph.D Program ==
minorThe Ph.D. Program in: "Brain Research Computation and Information Processing" is supported by a donation from Alice and Jack Ormut.

The goal of the multi-disciplinary doctoral program is to train students to address various aspects of computation and information processing in the brain.

The program provides students with theoretical and experimental expertise in:

- Neurobiology (information processing in nerve cells, structure and functional principles of the brain).
- Physics (neural networks, dynamic models, statistical mechanics and computation).
- Computer science (computation theory, learning, optimization).
- Psychology (cognition, memory, problem solving).

The program is designed to allow students with various backgrounds to supplement their knowledge in areas they have not studied, broaden their knowledge in topics crucial to every researcher in the field of brain sciences, and, finally, to allow each student to continue to broaden his/her knowledge in specific areas of interest.

The program is made up of three academic components:

- Required Courses - common to all students in the program.
- Optional Courses - courses that allow students to acquire expertise in the fields of research of their choice.
- Prerequisite Courses - The admissions committee will provide an individualized list of prerequisites for each student based upon his/her prior knowledge of the field.

The academic program is designed to allow students to complete the required coursework and prerequisites in four semesters.

Students who have completed their bachelor's degree in any field with an average of 85 or higher, or who have completed a master's degree in any field, are eligible to apply to the doctoral program. Admission is contingent on the approval of the program's admissions committee. Upon completion of three required courses, students will take a qualifying examination to determine their ability to continue in the doctoral program.

Students must also conduct a Ph.D. thesis project in accordance with the guidelines of the Ph.D. Student Committee.

Students who successfully complete the program are granted the degree of Doctor of Philosophy in Brain Sciences: Computation and Information Processing.
