= Hong Kong studies =

- Traditional Chinese: 香港學
Transcriptions
Yue: Cantonese
- Yale Romanization: Hēung góng hohk
- Jyutping: Hoeng1 gong2 hok6

Hong Kong studies or Hongkongology is a sub-field of East Asian studies involved in social sciences and humanities research on Hong Kong. It incorporates fields such as the study of Hong Kong language, society, culture, creative industries, economy, politics, history and environment.

== Academic discipline ==
In Hong Kong, the School of Modern Languages and Cultures, University of Hong Kong awards undergraduate level Bachelor of Arts honours degree in Hong Kong Studies. There is another university in Hong Kong which has established academy for the studies. The Academy of Hong Kong Studies, Education University of Hong Kong is an academy established in July 2015 to foster Hong Kong Studies within the regional universities. The Department of Social Sciences of the same university awards Bachelor of Social Sciences (Honours) in Global and Hong Kong Studies, and Master of Social Sciences in Global Hong Kong Studies.

Besides, Hong Kong Studies Initiative (HKSI) at the University of British Columbia also contributes in promoting the teaching and research of Hong Kong Studies.

National Sun Yat-Sen University has established the Taiwan-Hong Kong International Studies Center.

=== Scholarly journals ===
- Hong Kong Studies: a peer-reviewed scholarly journal published by The Chinese University of Hong Kong.

== Societies and institutions for Hong Kong studies ==
A number of scholarly societies and associations exist focused on Hong Kong studies, including:

Societies and institutions for Hong Kong studies
Organisation	Location	Founded	Focus
Society for Hong Kong Studies	Hong Kong	2017	a non-profit academic institute based in Hong Kong, which aims to enhance collaborations among scholars around the world.
Hong Kong Studies Association	United Kingdom	-	the HKSA aims to provide connections for scholars in European institutions.
Hong Kong Anthropological Society	Hong Kong	1978	focused on Hong Kong culture and ethnography.
Hong Kong Heritage Project	Hong Kong	2007	founded by Sir Michael Kadoorie to collect, preserve, and make available records and documentation related to Hong Kong's social and cultural heritage.
Hong Kong History Centre	History Department, the University of Bristol, United Kingdom	2022	focused on the history of Hong Kong through the support of early-career scholars, and the promotion of scholarly work.
Academy of Hong Kong Studies	Education University of Hong Kong, Hong Kong	2015	a scholarly association with an interdisciplinary focus on the study of Hong Kong.
Hong Kong Studies Hub	University of Surrey, United Kingdom	-	a scholarly organisation focused on methodological and theoretical approaches.
Global Hong Kong Studies	University of California, United States	-	focused on humanities and social sciences work on Hong Kong.
Hong Kong Studies Initiative	University of British Columbia, Canada	-	focused on the creation and dissemination of scholarly and community work focused on Hong Kong.

== Notable people ==
- Ackbar Abbas - scholar of globalisation, Hong Kong culture, architecture, cinema, postcolonialism, and critical theory, and author of Hong Kong: Culture and the Politics of Disappearance.
- Chan Koonchung - scholar, author, and developer of the 'Hong Kong as Method' approach
- Chan Shun-hing - known for his research on the intersection between Christianity and social movements in Hong Kong
- Chan Sze Chi - scholar of religiousity in Hong Kong.
- Joseph Cheng - scholar of Hong Kong politics and the founding editor of the Hong Kong Journal of Social Sciences and The Journal of Comparative Asian Development
- Robert Chung - scholar of electoral studies, political culture, public opinion, rural politics, and mobility studies, as well as president and chief executive officer of the Hong Kong Public Opinion Research Institute.
- Patrick Hase - historian specialising in the history of the New Territories.
- James Hayes - focused on the history and anthropology of the New Territories.
- Liz Jackson - scholar of the philosophy of education and educational theory including multiculturalism, civic education, Islamophobia, gender studies, critical and anti-racist pedagogy.
- Kuan Hsin-chi - scholar of political and legal culture and development.
- Li Long Lam - known for his study in Hong Kong pre-modern salt industry and coastal archaeology.
- Lo Hsiang-lin - researcher of Hakka language and culture as well as cultural exchange between the 'East' and 'West'.
- Bernard Mellor - historian whose works included several important histories of the University of Hong Kong.
- Paul Morris - educational scholar best known for his analysis of education policy in Hong Kong and former President of the Hong Kong Institute of Education.
- Ng Cho-nam - scholar of environmentalism and environmental policy.
- Steve Tsang - political scientist and historian whose expertise includes politics and governance.
- Chin Wan - localist scholar and author of the On the Hong Kong City-State series.
- Barbara E. Ward - social anthropologist who conducted research on different boat people communities in Hong Kong.
- Deric Daniel Waters - educator, scholar of building science and heritage conservationist and founding principal of the Morrison Hill Technical Institute
- Helena Wu - scholar of cultural studies and co-convenor of the Hong Kong Studies Initiative at the University of British Columbia.

== See also ==
- East Asian studies
- Oriental studies
