= Dan Waters (disambiguation) =

Dan Waters is a politician in Ontario, Canada.

Dan Waters may also refer to:

- Deric Daniel Waters (1920–2016), British scholar, known as Dan Waters on academic publications

== See also ==
- Daniel Waters (disambiguation)
- Daniel Walters (disambiguation)
