= Göran Aijmer =

Swedish anthropologist

- Born: 1936 (age 89–90)
- Occupation: social anthropologist
- Notable work: See list

Göran Aijmer (born 1936) is a Swedish social anthropologist. He is a professor at the University of Gothenburg in Sweden.

== Works ==
Works by Göran Aijmer include:

- Aijmer, Göran (1967). "Expansion and Extension in Hakka Society" (PDF). Journal of the Royal Asiatic Society Hong Kong Branch. 7: 42–79. ISSN 1991-7295.
- Aijmer, Göran (1968). "Being Caught by a Fishnet: On Fengshui in Southeastern China" (PDF). Journal of the Royal Asiatic Society Hong Kong Branch. 8: 74–81. ISSN 1991-7295.
- Aijmer, Göran (1980). Economic man in Sha Tin: vegetable gardeners in a Hong Kong valley. Curzon Press. ISBN 9780429770050.
- Aijmer, Göran (1986). Atomistic society in Sha Tin: immigrants in a Hong Kong valley. Acta Universitatis Gothoburgensis. ISBN 9789173461580.
- Aijmer, Göran (1990). "European Notions of Leadership and Chinese Ethnography". In Goodman, David S. G. (ed.). China and the West: Ideas and Activists. Manchester University Press. pp. 30–41. ISBN 978-0719029417.
