= English Renaissance =

Cultural and artistic movement in England

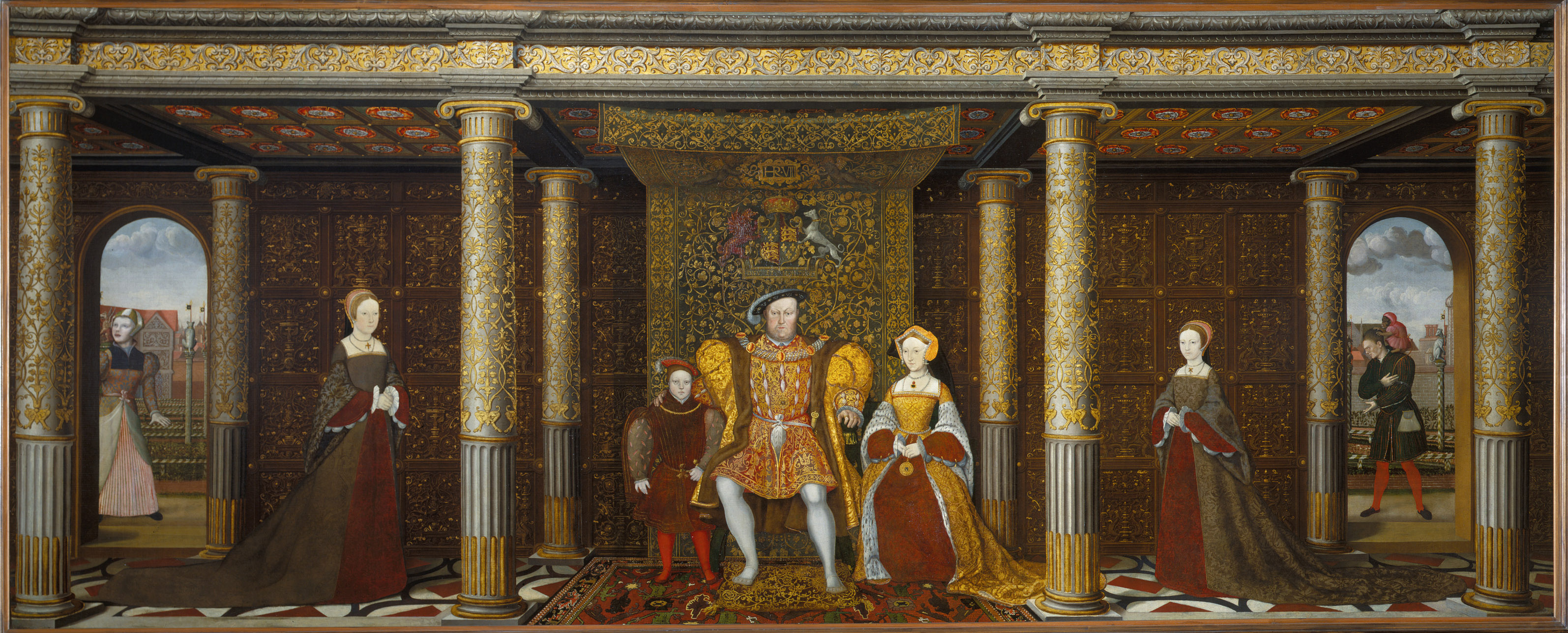
The Family of Henry VIII, c. 1545, at Hampton Court Palace; unknown artist

The English Renaissance was a cultural and artistic movement in England during the late 15th, 16th and early 17th centuries. It is associated with the pan-European Renaissance that is usually regarded as beginning in Italy in the late 14th century. As in most of the rest of Northern Europe, England saw little of these developments until more than a century later within the Northern Renaissance. Renaissance style and ideas were slow to penetrate England, and the Elizabethan era in the second half of the 16th century is usually regarded as the height of the English Renaissance. Many scholars see its beginnings in the early 16th century during the reign of Henry VIII. Others argue the Renaissance was already present in England in the late 15th century.

The English Renaissance is different from the Italian Renaissance in several ways. The dominant art forms of the English Renaissance were literature and music. Visual arts in the English Renaissance were much less significant than in the Italian Renaissance. The English period began far later than the Italian, which was moving into Mannerism and the Baroque by the 1550s or earlier.

== Literature ==
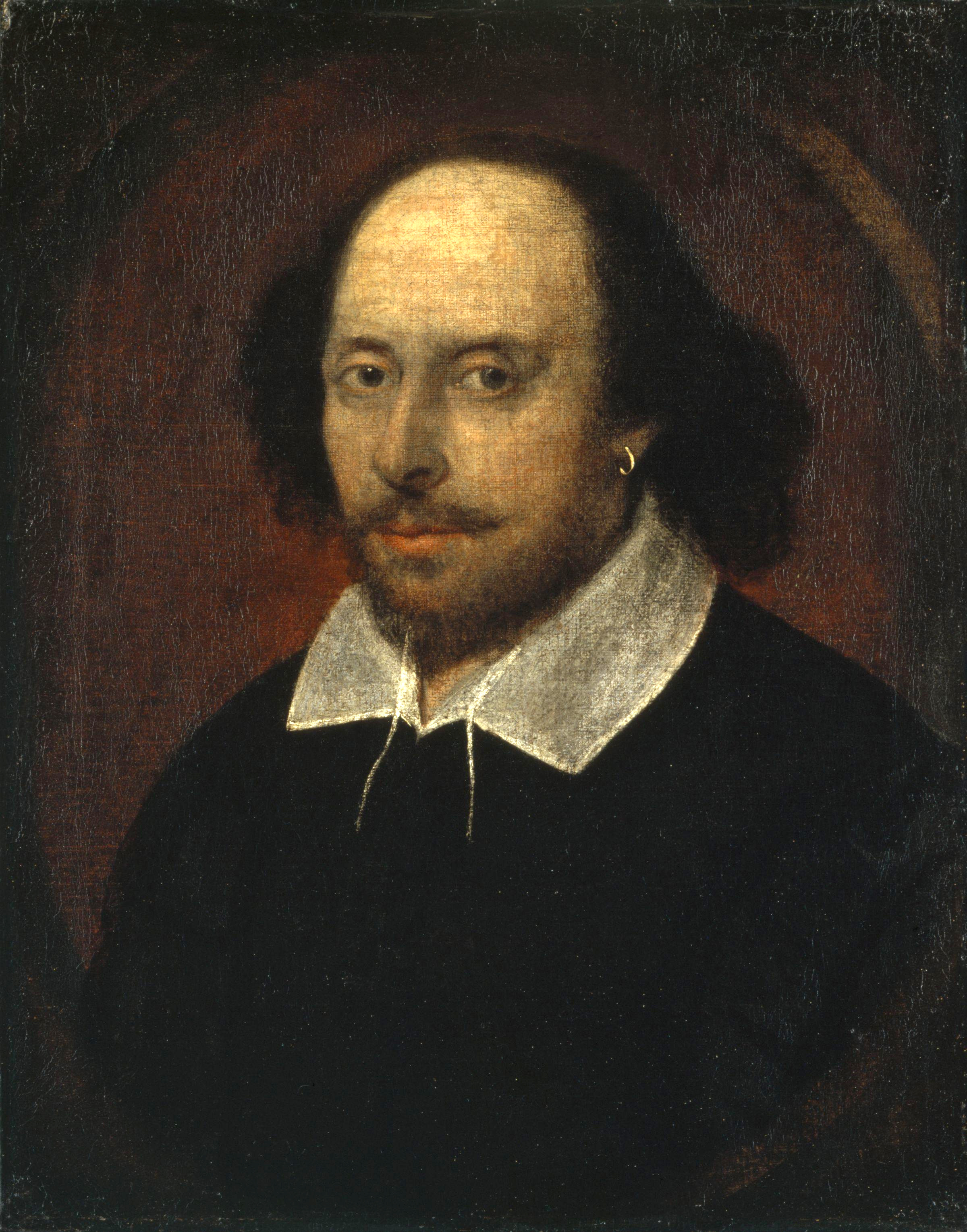
William Shakespeare, chief figure of the English Renaissance, as portrayed in the Chandos portrait (artist and authenticity not confirmed).

England had a strong tradition of literature in the English vernacular, which gradually increased as English use of the printing press became common by the mid-16th century. This tradition of literature written in English vernacular largely began with the Protestant Reformation's call to let people interpret the Bible for themselves instead of accepting the interpretation of the Catholic Church. Discussions of how to translate the Bible so that it could be understood by laymen but remain faithful to God's word became contentious, with people arguing how much license could be taken to impart the correct meaning without sacrificing its eloquence. The desire to let people read the Bible for themselves led William Tyndale to publish his own translation in 1526, giving way to Sir Rowland Hill's publication of the Geneva Bible in 1560, marking the re-establishment of the Church of England at the accession of Elizabeth I. These would be predecessors to the King James Version of the Bible.

Another early proponent of literature in the vernacular was Roger Ascham, who was tutor to Princess Elizabeth during her teenage years and is now often called the "father of English prose." He proposed that speech was the greatest gift to man from God and that to speak or write poorly was an affront. By the time of Elizabethan literature, a vigorous literary culture in both drama and poetry included poets such as Edmund Spenser, whose verse epic The Faerie Queene had a strong influence on English literature but was eventually overshadowed by the lyrics of William Shakespeare, Thomas Wyatt and others. Typically, the works of these playwrights and poets circulated in manuscript form for some time before they were published, and above all the plays of English Renaissance theatre were the outstanding legacy of the period. The works of this period are also affected by Henry VIII's declaration of independence from the Catholic Church and technological advances in sailing and cartography, which are reflected in the generally nonreligious themes and various shipwreck adventures of Shakespeare.

The English theatre scene, which performed both for the court and nobility in private performances and a very wide public in the theatres, was the most crowded in Europe, with a host of other playwrights as well as the giant figures of Christopher Marlowe, William Shakespeare and Ben Jonson. Elizabeth I herself was trained in Renaissance humanism by Roger Ascham, and wrote occasional poems such as "On Monsieur's Departure" at critical moments of her life. Philosophers and intellectuals included Thomas More and Francis Bacon. All the 16th-century Tudor monarchs were highly educated, as was much of the nobility, and Italian literature had a considerable following, providing the sources for many of Shakespeare's plays. English thought advanced towards modern science with the Baconian method, a forerunner of the Scientific method. The language of the Book of Common Prayer, first published in 1549, and at the end of the period the Authorised Version ("King James Version" to Americans) of the Bible (1611) had enduring and profound impacts on the English consciousness.

== Visual arts ==
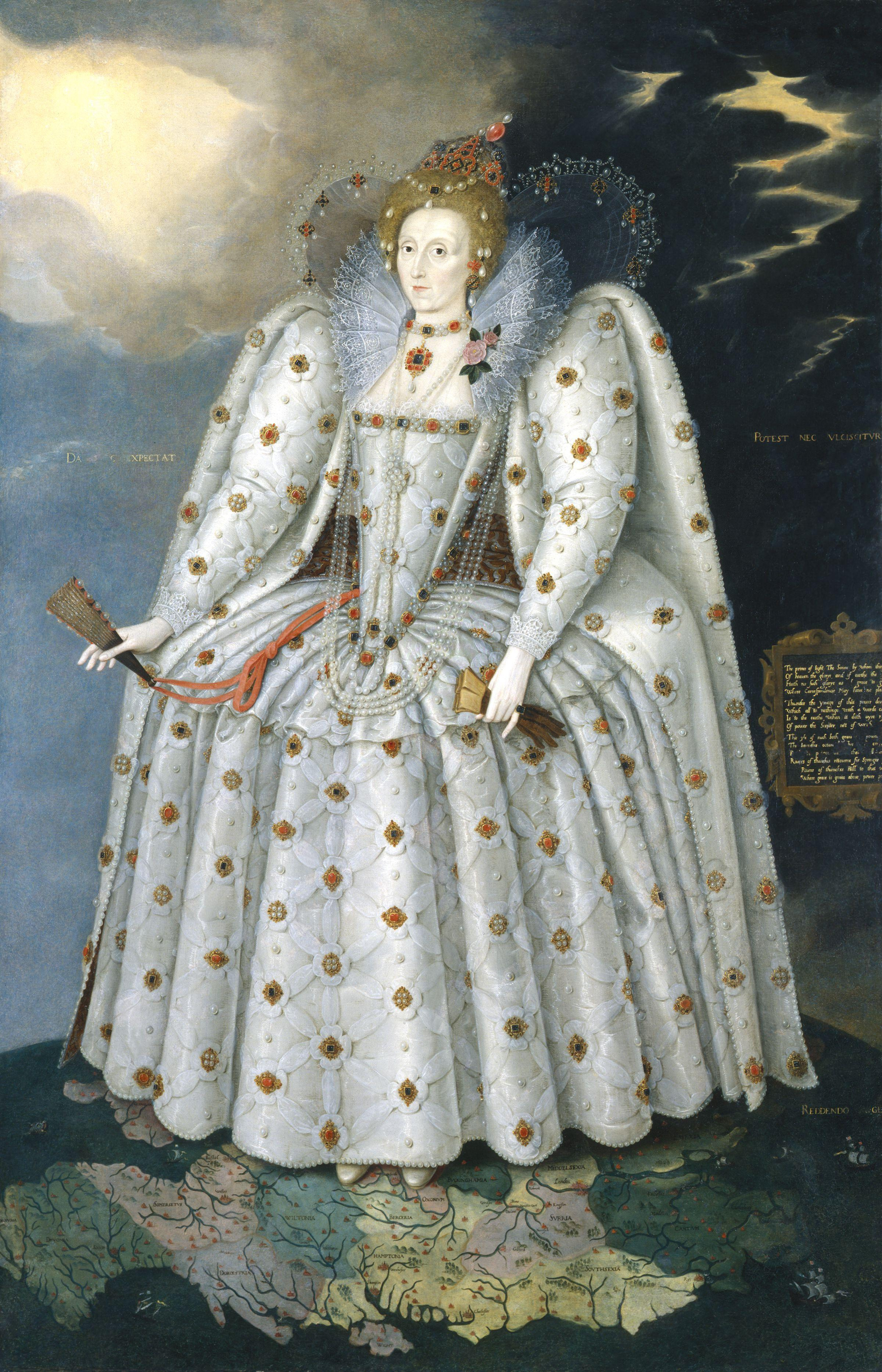
The Ditchley Portrait of Elizabeth I by the foreign Marcus Gheeraerts the Younger, c.1592

England was very slow to produce visual arts in Renaissance styles, and the artists of the Tudor court were mainly imported foreigners until after the end of the Renaissance; Hans Holbein was the outstanding figure. The English Reformation produced a huge programme of iconoclasm that destroyed almost all medieval religious art, and all but ended the skill of painting in England; English art was to be dominated by portrait painting, and then later landscape art, for centuries to come.

The significant English invention was the portrait miniature, which essentially took the techniques of the dying art of the illuminated manuscript and transferred them to small portraits worn in lockets. Though the form was developed in England by foreign artists, mostly Flemish like Lucas Horenbout, the somewhat undistinguished founder of the tradition, by the late 16th century, natives such as Nicolas Hilliard and Isaac Oliver produced the finest work, even as the best producers of larger portraits in oil were still foreigners. The portrait miniature had spread all over Europe by the 18th century. The portraiture of Elizabeth I was carefully controlled and developed into an elaborate and wholly un-realist iconic style, that has succeeded in creating enduring images.

== Women ==
Women also played an important role in the English Renaissance, although their contributions were often overlooked because society placed limitations on their education and opportunities. During this period women were generally expected to focus on marriage, motherhood, and managing the household, while the men were allowed to seek an education and explore their hobbies. However, women such as Elizabeth I demonstrated that a women could successfully rule a country, while Mary Sidney became known for her contributions to poetry and literature.

== Music ==
English Renaissance music kept in touch with continental developments far more than visual art, and managed to survive the Reformation relatively successfully, though William Byrd (c.1539/40 or 1543 – 1623) and other major figures were Catholic. The Elizabethan madrigal was distinct from, but related to, the Italian tradition. Thomas Tallis (c. 1505 –1585), Thomas Morley (1557 or 1558 – 1602), and John Dowland (1563–1626) were other leading English composers.

The colossal polychoral productions of the Venetian School had been anticipated in the works of Thomas Tallis, and the Palestrina style from the Roman School had already been absorbed prior to the publication of Musica transalpina, in the music of masters such as William Byrd.

The Italian and English Renaissances were similar in sharing a specific musical aesthetic. In the late 16th century Italy was the musical center of Europe, and one of the principal forms which emerged from that singular explosion of musical creativity was the madrigal. In 1588, Nicholas Yonge published in England the Musica transalpina—a collection of Italian madrigals that had been Anglicized—an event which began a vogue of madrigal in England which was almost unmatched in the Renaissance in being an instantaneous adoption of an idea, from another country, adapted to local aesthetics. English poetry was exactly at the right stage of development for this transplantation to occur, since forms such as the sonnet were uniquely adapted to setting as madrigals; indeed, the sonnet was already well developed in Italy. Composers such as Thomas Morley, the only contemporary composer to set Shakespeare, and whose work survives, published collections of their own, roughly in the Italian manner but yet with a unique Englishness; interest in the compositions of the English Madrigal School has enjoyed a considerable revival in recent decades.

== Architecture ==
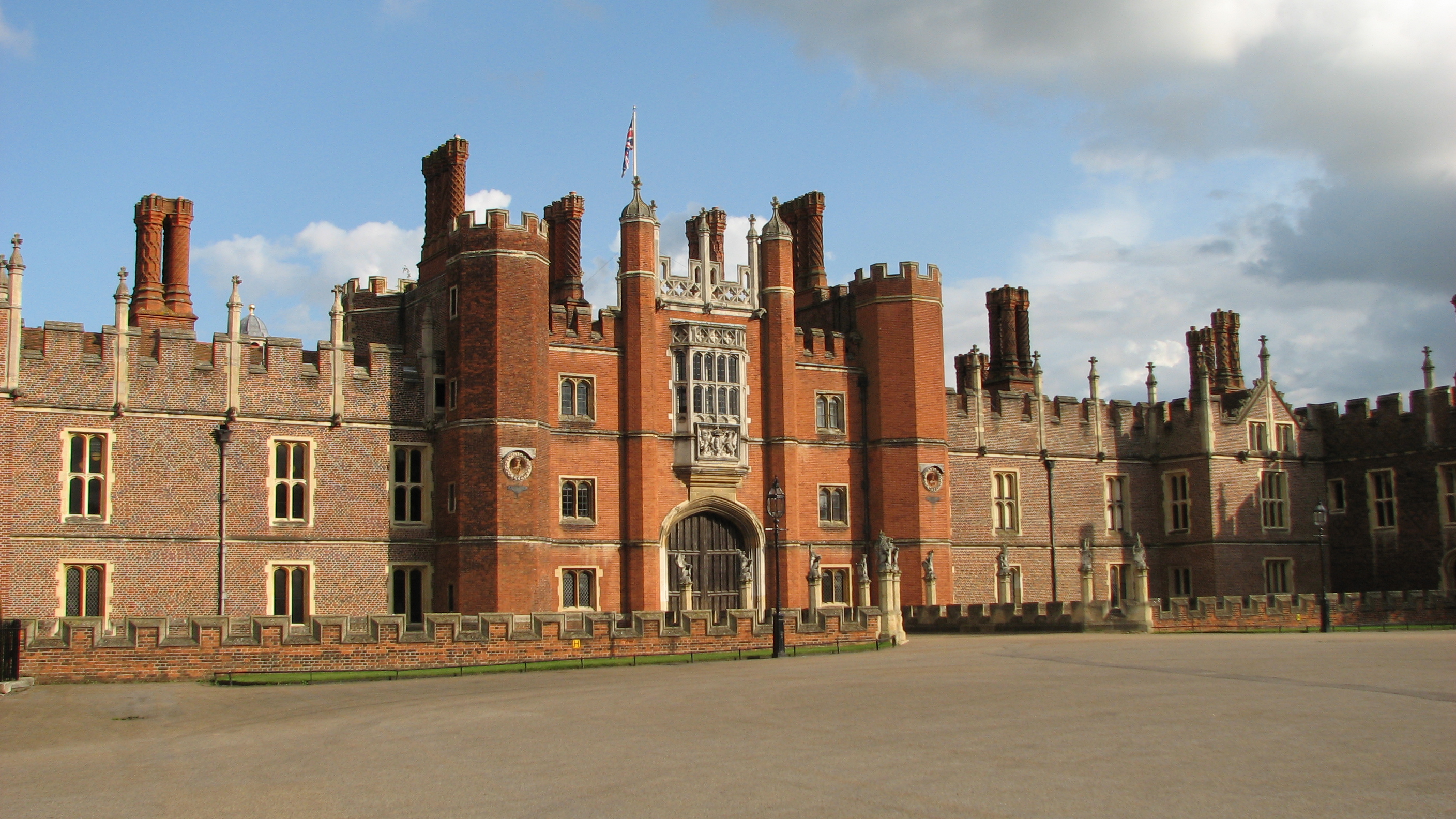
Hampton Court Palace

Despite some buildings in a partly Renaissance style from the reign of Henry VIII (1491–1547), notably Hampton Court Palace (begun in 1515), the vanished Nonsuch Palace, Sutton Place and Layer Marney Tower, and the building of Soulton Hall under Queen Mary I, it was not until dawning of Elizabethan architecture that a true Renaissance style became widespread, influenced far more by northern Europe than Italy.

The most famous buildings, of a type called the prodigy house, are large show houses constructed for courtiers, and characterized by lavish use of glass, as at "Hardwick Hall, more glass than wall", Wollaton Hall, Montacute House, Hatfield House and Burghley House, the style continuing into the early 17th century before developing into Jacobean architecture. Lesser, but still large, houses like Little Moreton Hall continued to be constructed and expanded in essentially medieval half-timbered styles until the late 16th century. Church architecture essentially continued in the late medieval Perpendicular Gothic style until the Reformation, and then stopped almost completely, although church monuments, screens and other fittings often had classical styles from about the mid-century. The few new church buildings post-Reformation were usually still Gothic in style, as in Langley Chapel of 1601.

== Major English Renaissance authors ==
Major literary figures in the English Renaissance include:

- Francis Bacon
- Francis Beaumont
- Thomas Campion
- George Chapman
- Francis Hubert
- Thomas Dekker
- John Donne
- John Fletcher
- John Ford
- John Milton
- Ben Jonson
- Thomas Kyd
- Christopher Marlowe
- Philip Massinger
- Thomas Middleton
- Thomas More
- Thomas Nashe
- William Rowley
- William Shakespeare
- James Shirley
- Philip Sidney
- Edmund Spenser
- William Tyndale
- John Webster
- Thomas Wyatt

== See also ==
- Tudor period
- Canons of Renaissance poetry
- Jacobean era
- Early modern Britain
- Walter Raleigh
