= Bernard Mellor =

British academic (1917–1998)

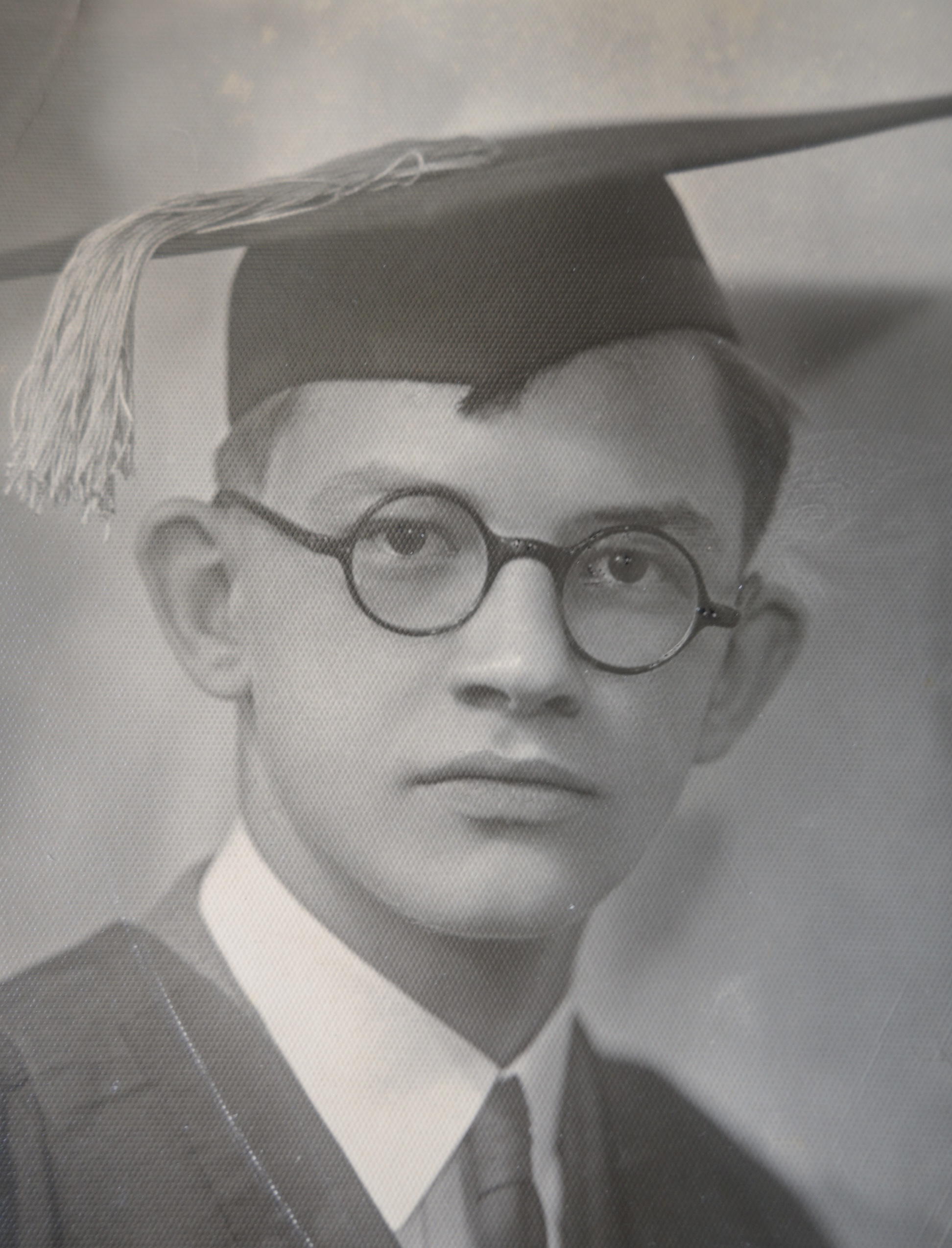
- Mellor, c. 1930s
- Born: 8 November 1917; Blackpool, Lancashire, England
- Died: 28 January 1998 (aged 80); Oxford, Oxfordshire, England
- Occupations: Intelligence agent; academic administrator

Academic background
- Education: Merton College, Oxford

Academic work
- Discipline: English literature
- Institutions: University of Hong Kong; University of Macau

Bernard Mellor (Chinese: 梅樂彬; 8 November 1917 – 28 January 1998) was a British academic active in Hong Kong and Macau. Born in Blackpool, England he studied literature at Merton College of the University of Oxford, where he was mentored by Edmund Blunden. He served in the Royal Artillery, British Indian Army, and MI6 during World War II. In 1944, he was stationed as an intelligence agent in Kunming, China, where he worked in deception campaigns alongside Peter Fleming. He travelled to Hong Kong in October 1945, and served as an education minister within the Civil Affairs Administration and as a lecturer at the University of Hong Kong. After a brief term as Acting Registrar and a return to Oxford, he was appointed as Registrar of the University of Hong Kong in January 1948. He served until 1974, and was awarded an honorary doctorate by the university. He was a founding member of the University of Macau, serving as a planning director from 1979 to 1988. In addition to his work as a registrar, he published a number of books on English poetry, alongside several books on the history of both universities. He died in Oxford in 1998.

== Early life ==
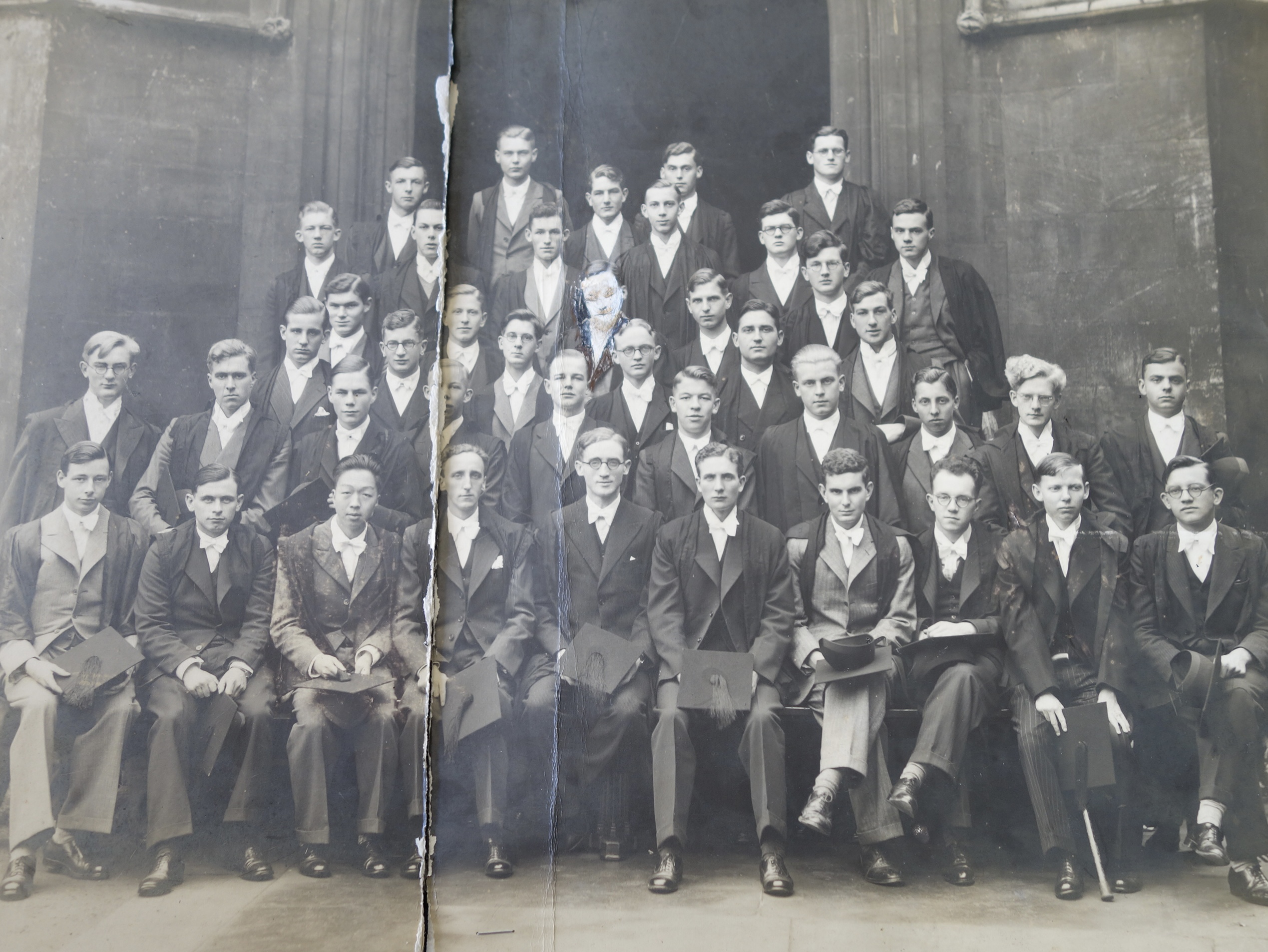
Bunny Mellor at Merton, bottom right, his friend Yang Xianyi, third from bottom left, 1930s.

Bernard Mellor was born on 8 November 1917 in Blackpool, Lancashire, England. The son of a local brewer, he initially sought to become a concert pianist as a youth, but was persuaded by his father to instead pursue academia. He attended Merton College at the University of Oxford from 1936 to 1940, where he studied literature. During his time at Oxford, he served as editor of the Cherwell student newspaper, alongside the paper's political correspondent, Edward Heath. He was mentored by Edmund Blunden, who would serve as a significant influence on his work. Additionally, he became friends with fellow student Yang Xianyi, by whom he was introduced to Chinese studies.

=== Military service ===
In 1940, during World War II, Mellor enlisted in the Royal Artillery, where he worked as a cook. While serving in an anti-aircraft unit during the Blitz, he wrote his first published work, a military cookbook entitled Ration Cooking for Small Detachments. He was commissioned as an intelligence agent in the 3rd Madras Regiment of the British Indian Army from 1942 to 1944, and designed an official uniform for the unit. He obtained his Master of Arts degree in 1943, during his service in the regiment.

In 1944, Mellor was sent to Kunming, China, where he served in MI6 (there known as the "Inter-Services Liaison Department"). For a period he worked in an espionage unit specializing in deception. This was headed by Peter Fleming, the elder brother of Ian Fleming. In this role, Mellor published a falsified version of the Illustrated London News for distribution in Burma. Following the end of the war, he was promoted to Major.

== University of Hong Kong ==
Mellor traveled to Hong Kong in October 1945, shortly after its liberation, where he served as the assistant director of education for the Civil Affairs Administration for a portion of 1945 to 1946. He was briefly appointed as a lecturer of English and the Acting Registrar of the University of Hong Kong in 1946. After this, he returned to Oxford. He met a swiss girl, Mauricette Jeanneret-Grosjean, in London through a classified advertisement in Times. She was looking for a position as an au pair to improve her English. Mellor offered to help her improve her English in exchange for contacts in Switzerland as he had wanted to visit the country for some time. The two fell in love and got married in Bern in September 1946, and would go on to have five sons.

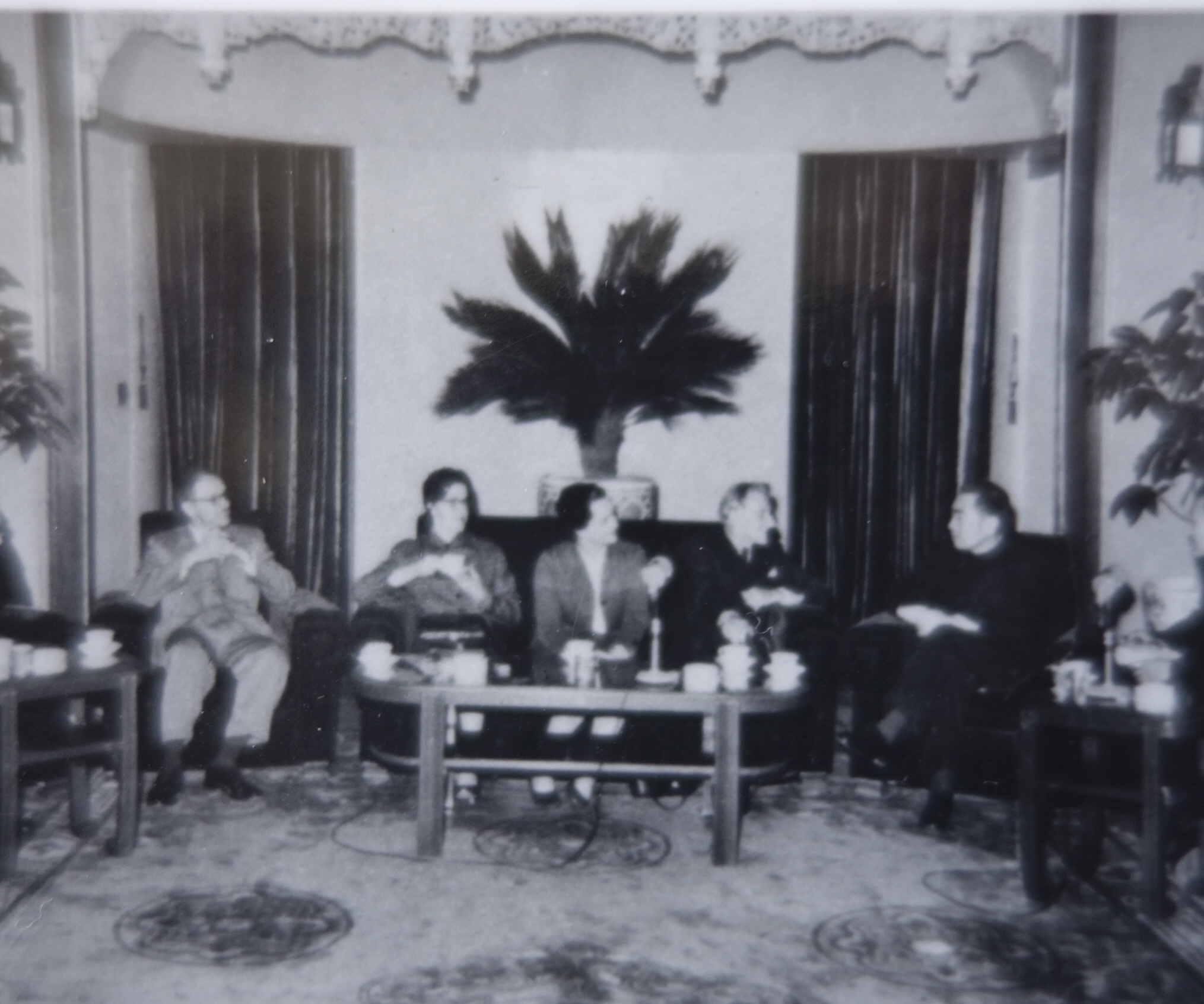
The Mellors & Blundens at the Summer Palace with Premier Zhou Enlai, 1955

In January 1948, Mellor returned to Hong Kong to serve officially in the position of Registrar. He served in this role until 1974, by which point he had served longer than any other registrar in the Commonwealth. He was referred to as Bunny Mellor among his colleagues at the university. He contributed to historical coverage of the institution, including a 1962 history of the university entitled The First Fifty Years, 1911-1961. Additionally, Mellor continued to publish works related to English poetry and literature, including a 1963 compilation of the two surviving works of 17th century poet Francis Hubert. In 1982, he published The University of Hong Kong: An Informal History, featuring a history of the university alongside a second volume consisting of various historical photos of the campus over time. Ten years later, he published Lugard in Hong Kong, extensively detailing Sir Frederick Lugard's term as Governor of Hong Kong and his foundation of the university.

From 1957 to 1958, Mellor worked as an academic consultant attached to the Embassy of the United Kingdom, Washington, D.C., at times working to advise scholars in Ottawa. During the early 1960s, he served on the board of New Asia College and Chung Chi College.

After leaving the University of Hong Kong, Mellor helped to found the University of East Asia (now the University of Macau), serving as its planning director and advisor from 1979 to 1988. He was appointed as an Officer of the Order of the British Empire in 1966. In 1974, he was awarded an honorary Doctorate of Letters by the University of Hong Kong. He died in Oxford on 28 January 1998.

== Published works ==
=== As author ===
- Mellor, Bernard (1960). The American Degree: A Comparative Study for British Students. Hong Kong University Press. ISBN 9780598163127.
- Mellor, Bernard (1962). "The American Foundations". In Harrison, Brian (ed.). University of Hong Kong: The First 50 Years, 1911-1961. University of Hong Kong Press.
- Edmund, Blunden; Mellor, Bernard (1963). Wayside Poems of the Seventeenth Century. Hong Kong University Press. ISBN 9780856560484.
- Edmund, Blunden; Mellor, Bernard (1964). Wayside Poems of the Early Eighteenth Century. Hong Kong University Press. ISBN 9780608137919.
- Edmund, Blunden; Mellor, Bernard (1971). Wayside Sonnets, 1750-1850. Hong Kong University Press. ISBN 9780196431239.
- Mellor, Bernard (March 1977). "Extraordinary Congregations: Notes for an Epic". Interflow. 8.
- Mellor, Bernard (1982). The University of Hong Kong: An Informal History. Hong Kong University Press. ISBN 9789882203013. JSTOR j.ctt2jc6h5.
- Mellor, Bernard (1988). The University of East Asia: Origin and Outlook. Macau: University of East Asia Press. ISBN 9789623080057.
- Mellor, Bernard (1992). Lugard in Hong Kong: Empires, Education and a Governor at Work 1907–1912. Hong Kong University Press. ISBN 9789622093164. JSTOR j.ctt2jc6jn.
- Mellor, Bernard (1998). "In India, in China, and Twice in Hong Kong". In Matthews, Clifford; Oswald, Cheung (eds.). Dispersal and Renewal: Hong Kong University During the War Years. Hong Kong University Press. ISBN 9789882201026. JSTOR j.ctt2jc7fn.

=== As editor ===
- Hubert, Francis (1961). Mellor, Bernard (ed.). The Poems of Sir Francis Hubert. University of Hong Kong Press. ISBN 9780856560552. JSTOR j.ctt2jc71v.
- Lindsay, Ride; May, Ride (1995). Mellor, Bernard (ed.). An East India Company Cemetery: Protestant Burials in Macao. University of Hong Kong Press. ISBN 9789622093843.
