= Hong Kong Studies (journal) =

- Discipline: Hong Kong studies
- Language: Chinese, English
- Edited by: Professor Michael O’Sullivan, Professor Eddie Tay, Dr. Michael Tsang, Dr. Tammy Lai-Ming Ho

Publication details
- History: 2018-present
- Publisher: The Chinese University of Hong Kong Press (Hong Kong)
- Frequency: Biannually
- Open access: Yes

Standard abbreviations
- ISO 4: Hong Kong Studies

Indexing
- ISSN: 2618-0510
- OCLC no.: 1118519769

Links
- Journal homepage

Hong Kong Studies (Traditional Chinese: 香港研究) is a biannual peer-reviewed open-access academic journal covering Hong Kong studies in Chinese and English. It is published by The Chinese University of Hong Kong Press and was established in 2018. The editors-in-chief are Professor Michael O'Sullivan, Professor Eddie Tay (Chinese University of Hong Kong), Dr. Michael Tsang (Newcastle University) and Dr. Tammy Lai-Ming Ho (Cha: An Asian Literary journal and Richard Charles Lee Canada-Hong Kong Library, University of Toronto).

The journal is the first academic journal covering exclusively Hong Kong studies.
