= USS Waters (DD-115) =

Wickes-class destroyer

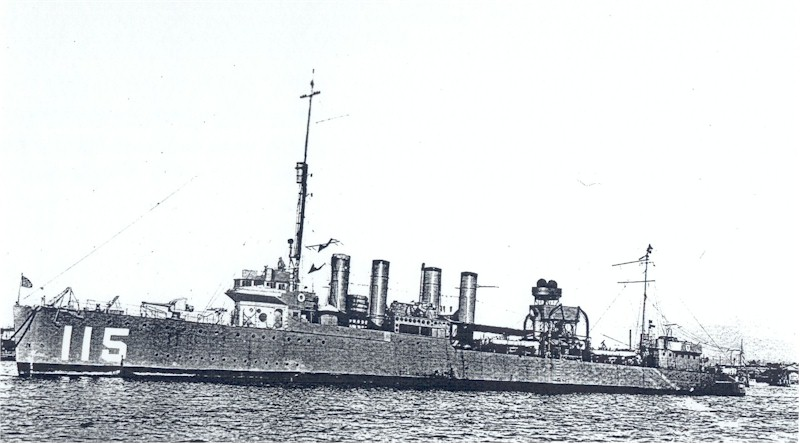
- USS Waters (DD-115)

History

United States
- Name: USS Waters
- Namesake: Daniel Waters
- Builder: William Cramp & Sons, Philadelphia
- Yard number: 452
- Laid down: 26 July 1917
- Launched: 3 March 1918
- Commissioned: 8 August 1918
- Decommissioned: 28 December 1922
- Identification: DD-115
- Recommissioned: 4 June 1930
- Decommissioned: 12 October 1945
- Reclassified: December 1942, APD-8
- Stricken: 24 October 1945
- Honors and awards: Seven battle stars for service during World War II
- Fate: Sold for scrap 10 May 1946

General characteristics
- Class & type: Wickes-class destroyer
- Displacement: 1154 tons
- Length: 314 ft 4 in (95.8 m)
- Beam: 30 ft 11 1/4 in (9.4 m)
- Draft: 9 ft 10 1/4 in (3.0 m)
- Speed: 35 knots (65 km/h)
- Complement: 122 officers and enlisted
- Armament: 4 × 4 in (102 mm)/50 caliber guns; 2 × 3 in (76 mm) guns; 12 × 21 in (533 mm) torpedo tubes; 2 × .30 cal (7.62 mm) machine guns; 2 × depth charge tracks; 1 × Y-gun

USS Waters (DD-115) was a Wickes-class destroyer in the United States Navy during World War I and World War II, later re-designated a high speed transport with the hull identification number APD-8. She was named in honor of Daniel Waters.

== Construction and commissioning ==
Waters was laid down on 26 July 1917 at Philadelphia by William Cramp & Sons. The ship was launched on 3 March 1918, sponsored by Miss Mary Borland Thayer. The destroyer was commissioned at the Philadelphia Navy Yard on 8 August 1918.

== Service history ==
=== World War I ===
Although her active service began late in World War I, Waters still managed to get in two round-trip voyages to the British Isles and one to the Azores before the armistice in November 1918. On 11 August, she joined a convoy at Tompkinsville, New York, and put to sea for England. She escorted her charges safely into Devonport on 23 August and stood out again four days later in the screen for four ships headed home.

The destroyer delivered the small convoy at New York on 6 September and, following a three-day layover, departed once again—this time bound for Ireland. Eleven days later, she entered the port at Buncrana. She remained there for eight days before again putting to sea. On 8 October, Waters arrived in New York and, but for a run to Newport, Rhode Island, on 31 October and 1 November, remained there until she put to sea with a convoy again on 4 November. This one was made up of 11 merchantmen bound for the Azores. Waters and her convoy were still three days steaming time from Ponta Delgada on 11 November 1918, when the armistice brought hostilities in Europe to a close. She entered the Portuguese island port with the convoy on 14 November. Eight days later, Waters headed west again and arrived at New York on 28 November.

=== Inter-war period ===
The destroyer remained there under repairs until mid-January 1919. On 15 January, she put to sea for another voyage to the Azores. Waters stayed in Ponta Delgada from her arrival on 21 January until 17 February when she headed back to the United States. She reached Boston on 25 February and moved to Philadelphia early in March for another series of repairs. On 3 April, she got underway for a brief run, via New York, to Guantanamo Bay, Cuba.

The destroyer returned to New York on 14 March and remained there through the end of the month. On 1 May, she stood out of port, in company with Craven, Dent, Hopewell, Philip, Roper, and Stockton, to take up station as part of the picket of destroyers dotting the path of the transatlantic flight to be conducted by Navy flying boats. After an overnight stop at Trepassey Bay, Newfoundland, on 4 and 5 May, Waters dropped anchor off Santa Cruz in the Azores on 10 May.

On 17 May, she got underway at 0643 and arrived at her station, located between the islands of Corvo and Flores, at 0750. There, she lay to await the passage of the three seaplanes attempting the flight. Finally, at about 1112, her crew heard the drone of the engines of a single seaplane as NC-4, the only one of the three seaplanes to successfully complete the flight, passed overhead.

That afternoon, the warship left her station to search for NC-1 which had made a forced landing at sea. During the search, she received word that the third plane, NC-3, was also lost in the fog. Just after noon the following day, she received word that NC-1 had been found and its crew rescued by the Greek cargo ship Ionia. Accordingly, Waters returned to her anchorage off Santa Cruz that night.

Early the next morning, she weighed anchor to participate in the search for NC-3; however, she soon learned that NC-3 had been sighted off Ponta Delgada, navigating on the surface, and heading for that port under its own power. That same day, 19 May, the warship departed the Azores and shaped a course for Newport, Rhode Island, where she arrived on 23 May.

The destroyer operated out of Newport and New York until mid-July. She was among the destroyers which escorted the battleship Pennsylvania out to sea on 8 July when Secretary of the Navy Josephus Daniels embarked in the battleship to meet George Washington, off New York harbor and to welcome President Woodrow Wilson as he returned home from the peace negotiations in Europe.

On 14 July, Waters sailed from New York, via Hampton Roads and the Panama Canal, to the west coast. She pulled into San Diego on 5 August and, after six weeks of operations which included a voyage to the Hawaiian Islands, was placed in reserve at San Diego on 21 September 1919.

==== 1920s ====
On 24 February 1920, Waters came out of reserve and moved to Bremerton, Washington, where she began a nine-month overhaul preparatory to her return to active service. While the destroyer was at Puget Sound, the Navy adopted the alphanumeric system of hull designations, and Waters became DD-115 on or about 17 July 1920. She completed her reconditioning on 30 November and returned to San Diego at the end of the first week in December.

During the first few months of 1921, she operated as a unit of Division X, a special organizational unit, to which Dorsey and Dent were also attached, pending the reconstitution of Division 14 in its entirety. In January and February, she made a cruise to Central and South America. She stopped in the Panama Canal Zone on her way south and visited Valparaíso and Mejillones Bay in Chile during the first two weeks of February and then returned to Panama for nine days of battle practice with the Fleet. On 23 February, she headed home and, after visits to Costa Rica and El Salvador, reached San Diego on 11 March.

Waters remained there until 21 June when she got underway north and, following brief stops at San Pedro and Mare Island, entered Bremerton, Washington, on 27 June to prepare at the Puget Sound Navy Yard for duty in the Far East. Almost a month later, she returned south to San Francisco, whence she sailed for the Far East on 21 July. After stops at Pearl Harbor, Midway, and Guam, Waters steamed into Manila Bay on 24 August and reported for duty with the Asiatic Fleet at the Cavite Navy Yard.

The destroyer remained in the vicinity of Luzon through most of her tour of duty in the Orient. She visited Olongapo and Manila frequently and conducted combat training and torpedo exercises off the northwestern shores of the island in Lingayen Gulf. On 3 June 1922, she departed the Philippines and headed north for the Asiatic Fleet's usual summer cruise to Chinese waters. She arrived at Shanghai three days later and, for the remaining seven weeks of her tour in the Orient, visited Chinese ports such as Yantai and Qinhuangdao.

On 25 August, the warship weighed anchor at Yantai to return to the United States. She stopped at Nagasaki in Japan, Midway Island, and Pearl Harbor en route to San Francisco, where she finally arrived on 3 October. After a week of repairs at Mare Island Navy Yard, Waters steamed south and, upon her arrival at San Diego on 23 October, immediately began preparations for inactivation. On 28 December 1922, Waters was decommissioned there and was laid up at the destroyer base.

==== 1930s ====
On 4 June 1930, following more than seven years of inactivity, Waters was recommissioned at San Diego. After a month of refurbishing, she began operations along the west coast on 18 July and continued that routine for the next 18 months.

On 1 February 1932, she departed the west coast for the first time since her return from the Far East in 1922. She arrived in Lahaina Roads in the Hawaiian Islands on 12 February and took part in a landing exercise as a unit of the antisubmarine screen. The destroyer spent most of her time in Lahaina Roads but managed brief visits to Oahu and Hilo.

Waters returned to San Diego on 21 March and resumed normal operations until late January 1933. On 24 January, the warship arrived at Mare Island where she was placed in Rotating Reserve Squadron 20. She passed the next six months idly, moored to pierside at Mare Island with a severely reduced crew on board.

Early in July 1933, Waters returned to active service as a unit of Destroyer Division (DesDiv) 5, Destroyer Squadron (DesRon) 2, Battle Force Destroyers. She left Mare Island on 10 July, arrived at San Diego two days later, and resumed operations along the west coast. After more than eight months of such activity, the warship put to sea from San Diego on 9 April 1934 for an extended voyage to the Atlantic.

Waters reached Balboa, Canal Zone, on 22 April, transited the canal three days later, and was moored at Cristobal for a fortnight. On 5 May, she sailed for the gunnery range at Culebra Island near Puerto Rico. For the next three weeks, Waters participated in maneuvers in conjunction with Fleet Problem XV, a three-phased exercise which encompassed an attack upon and defense of the Panama Canal, the capture of advanced bases, and a major fleet engagement. On 25 May, the destroyer shaped a course north to Rhode Island. After a stop at New York City, she stood into Newport on 6 July and conducted tactical exercises out of Newport for two months.

On 7 September, she embarked upon a leisurely voyage back to San Diego. Along the way, she stopped at Hampton Roads, Tampa, Florida, and Guantanamo Bay, Cuba. Consequently, the warship did not transit the canal until 25 October. She reached San Diego on 8 November and went back into the Rotating Reserve on 19 December.

The warship returned to active duty in May 1935, and resumed operations along the west coast as a unit of DesDiv 19. Late in April 1936, she steamed south to the Panama Canal where she again joined in the maneuvers associated with the annual fleet concentrations which were conducted on the Pacific side of the isthmus. She returned to San Diego at the end of the first week in June and conducted normal operations for a month before leaving the west coast on 6 July.

Her voyage to Hawaii came as a result of DesDiv 19's assignment to the Submarine Force in conjunction with sonar tests. Sometime during the first half of the year, Waters and her sisters in the division had received the latest sound gear—high frequency directional sonar which allowed a destroyer to locate a submarine more accurately. Previously, sonar could at best indicate the presence of a submarine somewhere near the destroyer. The new equipment enabled submarine hunters to estimate the interloper's bearing and distance and therefore increased the probability of success of the destroyer's depth charge attacks. From July 1936 until late June 1939, Waters and her division mates cooperated with units of the Submarine Force in experiments to develop the techniques which translated the theoretical potential of the new technological developments into efficient antisubmarine warfare doctrine. Waters departed Hawaii for the west coast on 20 June 1939. She reached San Diego ten days later and was assigned to the Underwater Sound Training School. Between that time and America's entry into World War II, the destroyer continued to develop the Navy's antisubmarine warfare capability by teaching techniques which she had developed to sonar operators and officers assigned to the Fleet.

=== World War II ===
When the Japanese launched their surprise attack on Pearl Harbor, Waters was in port at San Diego and still operating with the Sound School. She received word of the hostilities at 11:25 and immediately began preparations to put to sea. That afternoon, the destroyer made a three-hour antisubmarine sweep of the approaches to San Diego. On 8 December, she departed San Diego in the screen of Hawaii-bound aircraft carrier Saratoga. Six days later, the carrier and her screen, DesDiv 50, entered Pearl Harbor. During her ten days at Oahu, Waters periodically conducted patrols of the sea approaches to the harbor. Two days before Christmas, she got underway homeward with a task unit built around the cruisers St. Louis, Helena, and Raleigh. She escorted the cruisers into San Francisco on 29 December and returned to San Diego on 30 December.

==== 1942 ====
After a month patrolling the California coast, Waters slipped her moorings at San Diego on 31 January 1942 and headed north for duty with the defense forces of the 13th Naval District. She arrived at Bremerton, Washington, on 5 February and, six days later, continued north to Alaska. For the next ten months, the destroyer escorted supply ships from Seattle, Washington, to and between the bases along the Alaskan coast and through the Aleutians chain. She was later assigned to the forces of the Northwestern Sea Frontier as a unit of Task Force 8, the Alaskan defense force. Her mission, however, remained the same as she plied the cold Waters of the northeastern Pacific between such ports as Kodiak, Dutch Harbor, Chernofski, Adak, and Sitka—returning periodically to Seattle.

The exigencies of the campaign for Guadalcanal— where neither side enjoyed the overwhelming local naval and air supremacy which insured victory in every other amphibious operation of the war—necessitated an increase in the number of high-speed transports. These hybrid warships combined the functions of transports and of destroyers into one. The concept of the high-speed transport embodied sufficient armament for the ship to defend herself against smaller warships and to support the troops she carried with sufficient speed to enable her to outrun more heavily armed ships. Overage flushdeck destroyers such as Waters were the first ships to be so converted to fill this role.

Waters entered the Puget Sound Navy Yard on 19 December 1942 to begin conversion and later that month was redesignated APD-8. During the modifications, her forward boilers were removed to make room for the troops she would carry while her torpedo tubes came off to accommodate landing craft and their davits. Though the ship retained her four-gun main battery configuration, she swapped her obsolete single-purpose 4-inch (102 mm) guns for more up-to-date dual-purpose 3-inch (76 mm) guns. Her antiaircraft defenses were further augmented by the addition of several single 20 mm mounts. She completed conversion in February and returned to San Diego on 10 February.

==== 1943 ====
On 17 February, Waters stood out of San Diego, bound for the South Pacific. After a five-day stop at Pearl Harbor, she resumed her voyage and reported for duty with the South Pacific Amphibious Force at Noumea, New Caledonia, on 21 March. Five days later, she got underway for Espiritu Santo where she arrived the following day. For the next three weeks, the high-speed transport conducted amphibious training at Espiritu Santo with units of the 4th Marine Raider Battalion. On 18 April, Waters headed for the Fiji Islands. She arrived at Suva two days later, embarked men and equipment of Carrier Air Group 11, and proceeded via Espiritu Santo to the Solomons. She arrived off Guadalcanal on 25 April, disembarked her passengers, unloaded cargo, and departed the same day.

During the next nine days, she made a circuitous voyage that took her first to Efate, thence to the Fijis, and from there back to Espiritu Santo where she arrived on 4 May. Eleven days later, the warship exited Segond Channel and set a course for Pago Pago in American Samoa where she stopped from 19 to 23 May. The next stop on her itinerary was Auckland, New Zealand, where she laid over from 29 May to 5 June while her crew enjoyed their last real shore leave for quite some time. Waters returned to Nouméa on 8 June and got underway the following day with a convoy bound for the southern Solomons. She and her charges arrived off Guadalcanal on 14 June, and the high-speed transport began patrolling the anchorage off Koli Point.

With her arrival in the Solomons, Waters began almost a year engaged in the type of operations for which ships of her type were ideally suited. The remnants of the Japanese defense forces had evacuated Guadalcanal over three months before, and the American Navy, Marine Corps, and Army possessed relatively secure bases—at that island and across Ironbottom Sound at Port Purvis on Florida Island—from which to begin the climb up the Solomons staircase toward the Bismarcks and Rabaul. Operating from Purvis Bay at Florida Island, Waters shuttled troops and supplies north to the invasions of various central and northern Solomon Islands—New Georgia, Vella Lavella, Bougainville, Treasury Island, and the Green Islands subgroup. After the move toward the Bismarcks began in earnest, she supported both initial invasions and consolidation operations.

New Georgia, the center island of a cluster which, with Vella Lavella, made up the southern branch of the Solomon Archipelago, constituted the second rung on the ladder to Rabaul. While Waters waited for the assault on that island, scheduled for the end of June, she patrolled the anchorages of Ironbottom Sound between Guadalcanal and Florida Island. On 16 June, she fought her first action when attacking Japanese planes dropped a stick of bombs close aboard. She returned the compliment more accurately than her adversaries, as her antiaircraft battery splashed two of the offending bombers.

Four days later, she received orders to move to Guadalcanal to embark five officers and 187 men of the 4th Marine Raider Battalion, part of a force hastily collected to occupy Segi Point on the southern coast of New Georgia. The Japanese were then moving in on a coastwatcher named Kennedy who held the plantation on the point, and Rear Admiral Richmond K. Turner decided to advance the date of the opening of the Segi Point phase of the New Georgia operation in order to keep possession of the beachhead which for all intents and purposes was already established there and to protect Kennedy and his native guerrillas. Waters and Dent transited the Slot during the night of 20 and 21 June and, early the next morning, threaded their way through the uncharted shoal water between New Georgia and Vangunu to Segi Point. In less than two hours, the two former flushdeckers disembarked their passengers and stood out to sea again. After a daylight passage back down the Slot, Waters and her sister ship returned to Guadalcanal late that afternoon and thence moved to Port Purvis without incident.

On 25 June, Waters moved to Guadalcanal to embark more troops, this time the "Barracudas" scout troops of the Army's 172nd Infantry. Until 29 June, she practiced amphibious landings at Purvis Bay; then headed north for the landings on Rendova, a small island south of New Georgia and directly opposite Munda, the main objective of the operation. The troops she carried were to have led the assault on Rendova and to have secured a beachhead for the main invasion force. However, heavy weather obscured the beacon fires which were to have guided them ashore, and the "Barracudas" landed some 10 miles (20 km) down the coast from their objective. By the time they reembarked and moved up the coast, the troops were able to land unopposed across a beachhead already established by units of the main invasion force. Waters completed disembarkation and unloading operations without further incident and, by 0855, stood down Blanche Channel in company with Dent to return to Purvis Bay, where she anchored that afternoon.

Rendova had been taken primarily as a stepping-stone to the main objective—Munda—as well as its airstrip— and to provide locations for supporting heavy artillery and its observation posts. By the time troops began shuttling from Rendova to Zanana—located to the east of Munda Point—for the planned occupation, Waters had picked up more troops at Guadalcanal and had landed them on the opposite coast of New Georgia. She departed Guadalcanal on 4 July and, the following morning, sent them ashore at Rice Anchorage on the northern coast of the island. The force she landed, a mixture of Marine Corps and Army units, succeeded in isolating and reducing the Japanese garrisons at Bairoko and on Enogai Inlet while the troops in the south concentrated upon the seizure of Munda without fear of interference from the north.

During the next ten days, she made two more runs to New Georgia carrying reinforcements and supplies to Rendova and returning to Guadalcanal with casualties. On the morning of 13 July, in the aftermath of the naval battles of Kula Gulf and Kolombangara, she escorted the cruisers Honolulu and St. Louis into Purvis Bay. Two days later, she received orders to head for Vella Lavella—located northwest of New Georgia—to pick up survivors from Helena which had been sunk during the Battle of Kula Gulf. She embarked three war correspondents at Koli Point and cleared Guadalcanal at 1325 on 15 July. At 2258 that night, she hauled in sight of her destination and began searching for the Helena sailors. At 0159 on 16 July, she lowered her boats to enter Paraso Bay. Later, she moved to Lambu Lambu cove, where her boats picked up 40 survivors from the sunken cruiser. She completed rescue operations at 0450 and departed Vella Lavella for Guadalcanal. She disembarked the 40 survivors at Tulagi just after 1300 and anchored in Purvis Bay an hour later.

For the next month, Waters transported supplies, reinforcements, and garrison troops from Guadalcanal to Rendova and New Georgia and evacuated casualties in support of the mopping up of New Georgia and the capture of the remainder of the smaller islands of the group. During these operations, she served both as a transport and as escort for the slower and less well-armed landing ship tanks (LSTs) and landing craft infantry (LCIs) which were used so extensively for transportation throughout the campaigns in the southwestern Pacific.

In mid-August, while the troops she had ferried to New Georgia over the previous seven weeks continued to mop up that island and the smaller ones surrounding it, Waters trained her sights on a new objective. Though Kolombangara, the big round island just to the northwest of New Georgia, appeared to be the next step in the ascent to Rabaul, American commanders had become intrigued with the possibility of by-passing, or "leapfrogging," its strong garrison and isolating it by occupying Vella Lavella, the next island above it on the southern arm of the Solomons chain.

Accordingly, Waters and six other fast transports loaded troops and equipment at Guadalcanal on 13 and 14 August. Two other transport groups, both composed of slower ships—LSTs and LCIs—departed ahead of her and her sisters who cleared Guadalcanal just before 1600 on 14 August. On the way up the Slot, the faster transports took over the lead from the tank landing ships and landing craft and arrived off Vella Lavella at 0529 the following morning. Since there was no organized Japanese garrison on the island, troops from Waters and the other fast transports established and consolidated their beachhead quickly. By 0730, she was steaming back down the Slot toward Guadalcanal and Purvis Bay. During the first hour of the passage, planes from the enemy air raids which halfheartedly contested the Vella Lavella landings attacked the transports. Waters's antiaircraft battery engaged the attackers, but neither side scored. The remainder of the trip proved uneventful, and Waters dropped anchor in Purvis Bay at 2133 that night.

Over the next two months, Waters transported replacement troops, reinforcements, and supplies to New Georgia and Vella Lavella. On the return trips, she evacuated casualties and later, after both islands had been secured and garrison forces had moved in, began evacuating the combat-weary veterans of the campaign. These operations signaled the close of the central Solomons phase of the campaign to isolate Rabaul. Future operations centered upon Bougainville, the northernmost major island in the Solomons. In preparation for the invasion of that island, Waters participated in simulated amphibious landings at Kukum Beach on Guadalcanal on 26 October. Later that day, she embarked New Zealand troops and laid a course up the Slot to the Treasury Islands, a small pair located not far south of Bougainville and ideally suited as a staging base for small craft and PT boat patrols. The warship landed her portion of the Treasuries assault force expeditiously on 27 October and returned south to Purvis Bay the next day.

Waters remained at Purvis Bay for the remainder of October and into the first week of November. Consequently, she missed the 1 November landings on Bougainville at Cape Torokina. However, she moved to Guadalcanal on 4 November, loaded elements of the second echelon, and stood out toward Bougainville. She entered Empress Augusta Bay at 0609 on 6 November and disembarked her passengers by 0733. She then stood out of the bay and took up patrol position outside and helped to screen the entrance to the bay until the following day when she steamed back toward Purvis Bay.

For the following two weeks, Waters shuttled troops and equipment back and forth between Guadalcanal and Bougainville. All but the last of those trips were relatively peaceful affairs which began with troop embarkation at Guadalcanal, disembarkation at Empress Augusta Bay after passage up the Slot, and a return voyage with casualties bound for Guadalcanal. During the last voyage, however, enemy dive bombers attacked her convoy just as it arrived off Cape Torokina at 0755 on 17 November; the warship's antiaircraft batteries quickly engaged the intruders and scored a kill on a Japanese Aichi D3A "Val." During a lull in the attacks, Waters disembarked her troops, but another air raid at 0615 delayed the embarkation of wounded, and she did not complete the operation until 0845. She laid off Cape Torokina until 1819 when she formed up with a south-bound convoy and headed back to Guadalcanal. On 19 November, she disembarked the casualties at Kukum Beach and returned to Purvis Bay at about 1330.

After 11 days in port at Purvis Bay, Waters departed the Solomons for the first time since her arrival the previous June. On 1 December, she stood out of Purvis Bay for Nouméa, where she arrived on 3 December. Two days later, she weighed anchor again to escort Liberty ships Amy Lowell and Juan Cabrillo, (Note: The following ships were Liberty ships : MCE-734 SS Amy Lowell operated by Seas Shipping Co., MCE-291 SS Juan Cabrillo operated by American-Hawaiian Steamship Co., MCE-509 SS Walter Colton operated by Seas Shipping Co. See Capt. Walter W. Jaffee "The Liberty Ships from A to Z".) as far as Lady Elliot Island and then continued independently to Australia. She reached Sydney on 10 December and began nine days of shore leave and repairs.

On the morning of 20 December, she sailed for New Caledonia. On 23 December, she received orders to rendezvous with the Liberty ship Walter Colton, and to escort that ship into Nouméa. The warship reached the rendezvous point on Christmas Eve Day and began a fruitless two-day search for Walter Colton. Early in the evening of 25 December, she gave up the search and entered Nouméa alone.

Four days later, Waters returned to sea and, on 30 December 1943, joined the screen of a Guadalcanal-bound convoy. En route back to the Solomons, Waters received orders detaching her from the convoy and instructions to rendezvous with Sea Barb (Note: The following ships were Maritime Commission C3-S-A2 type : MC-277 SS Sea Barb, MC-277 SS Sea Cat. Both were operated by the War Shipping Administration for the US Army. See Capt. Walter W. Jaffee "The Freighters from A to Z".) and see that ship safely to Auckland, New Zealand. She made the rendezvous that same day, 5 January 1944, escorted her to her destination, and came about to return to Nouméa. Waters arrived in Nouméa on 9 January and, a week later, entered drydock for three days. On 20 January, the day after she left the dock, the fast transport headed back to the Solomons and, two days later, arrived in Purvis Bay.

==== 1944 ====
After a brief excursion as target ship for TF 38 on 24 and 25 January, she moved to Guadalcanal on 28 January and embarked a reconnaissance party for the initial raid on the Green Islands, a small pair north of Buka and Bougainville. She departed Guadalcanal the same day and headed up the Slot. En route, she stopped at Vella Lavella on 29 January to embark a further 112 troops, all members of the 30th Battalion, New Zealand Commando Force. That evening, the fast transport and the embarked raiders rehearsed the landing at Vella Lavella. The next morning, she started out on the last leg of the journey. The landing force reached the Green Islands around 2400 that night, and the commandos landed, unopposed, on Nissan, the larger of the two islands. At 0120 on 31 January, Waters received word that the landing had succeeded. Later that evening, she moved in toward the Nissan transport area to recover the reconnaissance party which had completed its mission. She completed reembarkation before dawn on 1 February and steamed back down the Slot. Later that day, she and Hudson parted company with the rest of the task group to return the New Zealanders to Vella Lavella. Afterward, she continued on toward Guadalcanal, where she arrived on 2 February.

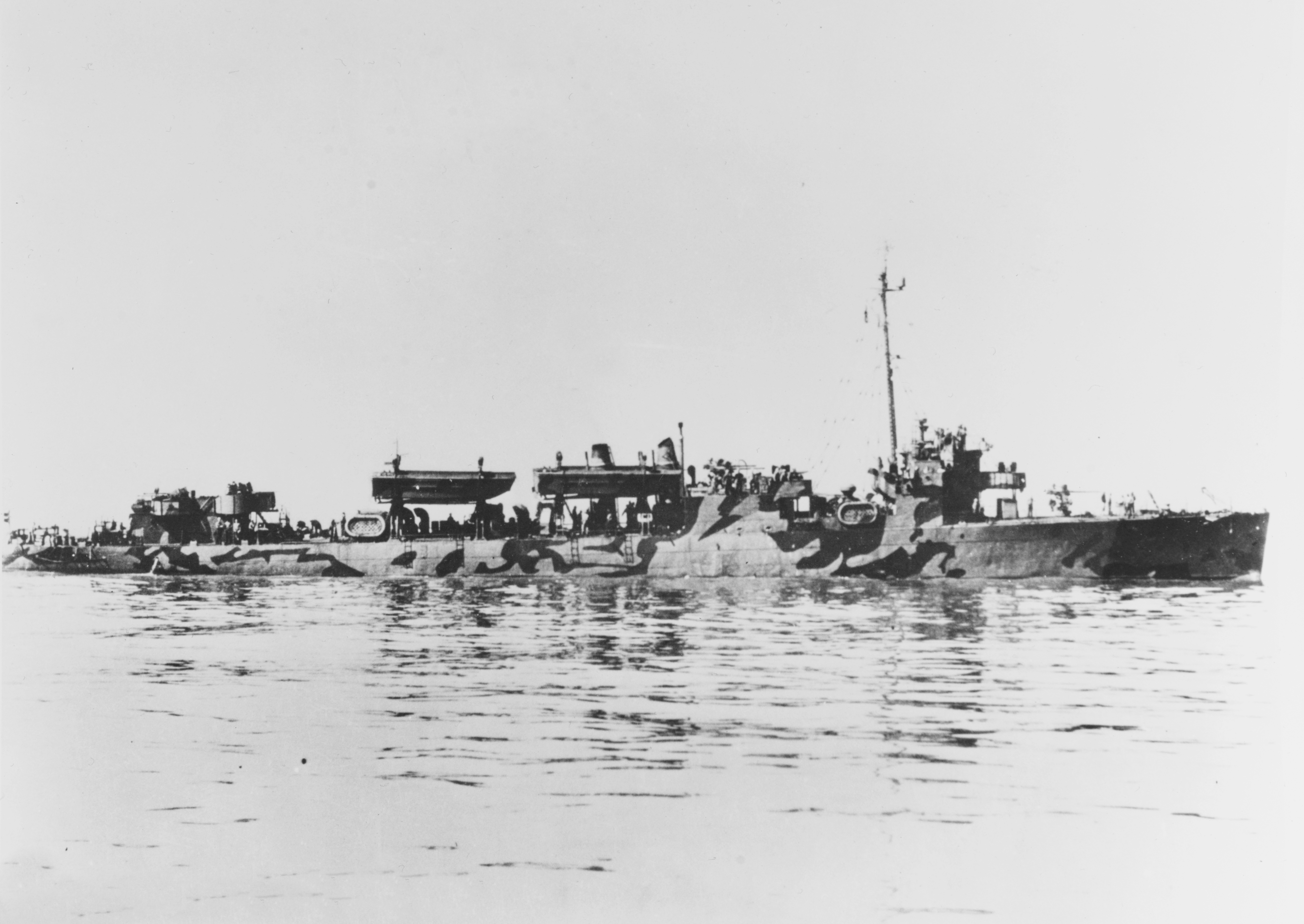
Waters as a high-speed transport.

After offloading her remaining passengers at Guadalcanal, Waters returned to Purvis Bay for an 11-day stay. On 13 and 14 February, the fast transport retraced her steps of two weeks before. On 13 February, she embarked troops at Guadalcanal and steamed northwest up the Slot. The following day, she stopped at Vella Lavella and took on additional troops, mostly members of the 207th Battalion, 3rd New Zealand Division, before continuing on to the Green Islands for the actual occupation. At 0625 on 15 February, the task force arrived off Nissan and began landing the occupation force. The minuscule enemy garrison did not oppose the landing and Waters completed her part of the mission and cleared the area by 0846. She returned to Florida Island on 16 February. Between 18 and 21 February, the warship made another round-trip voyage to the Green Islands to ferry a mixed bag of Navy, Army, and New Zealand forces before reentering Purvis Bay for the remainder of the month.

During the first half of March, she made two more voyages to the Green Islands—via Bougainville—before returning to Purvis Bay on 16 March to prepare for the occupation of Emirau Island. At 0630 on 17 March, she shifted from Florida Island to Guadalcanal, where she embarked units of the newly reconstituted 4th Marines. At 1800, she passed through Indispensable Strait with the Emirau invasion force and laid in a course to the northwest of the Solomons and New Ireland. At 0615, she arrived in the St. Matthias Islands and began disembarking troops for the invasion of Emirau, the southernmost island of the group. Once again, Waters' troops made their landing unopposed. The fast transport completed unloading by 1030 and took up station to patrol the transport area against enemy submarines. Finally, at 1930 that evening, she formed up with the other ships of the force and headed back to the southern Solomons. On the evening of 22 March, the force retransited Indispensable Strait and, the next morning, broke up off Savo Island to return to their various anchorages. Waters reentered Purvis Bay at 1130 and let go her anchor.

The fast transport remained in Purvis Bay for the remainder of March and the first week in April. On 8 April, she stood out of the anchorage, picked up passengers at Guadalcanal, and took departure for Pearl Harbor in company with Stringham. She made a brief stop at Funafuti, in the Ellice Islands, on 11 April and moored at the DE docks in Pearl Harbor on 18 April. The warship completed repairs by 1 May and began amphibious training at Kauai to prepare for the Marianas operation.

On 21 May, while Waters was in Pearl Harbor, an LST moored near her exploded. (Note: The first explosion occurred aboard LST 353. See West Loch Disaster.) The resulting fire quickly spread to ships moored nearby. Though Waters was unable to get underway immediately and clear the area, her crew responded quickly by manning the fire-fighting equipment and wetting down the decks. Further explosions occurred during the afternoon, showering her with debris and injuring one of her crewmen, but the warship sustained relatively minor damage—a few sprung doors, cut cables, some sprung bulkheads, a bent yardarm brace, and a slightly damaged hull frame. Later, her crew responded to the emergency by launching the ship's boats and rescuing 75 survivors from the oil and fire-covered Waters surrounding the stricken LSTs. The fires smoldered for two days after the incident, and fire-fighting parties were called away intermittently. However, Waters soon completed repairs of the damage caused on 21 May and resumed amphibious exercises in preparation for Operation Forager

On 28 May, Waters stood out of Pearl Harbor for Kawaihae Bay, where she embarked marines the following day. That same day, she joined TF 51 and departed the Hawaiian Islands en route to Eniwetok Atoll, the staging point for the invasion of Saipan. She entered Eniwetok Lagoon at 0900 on 8 June and remained at anchor there for three days. On 11 June, TF 52—the Northern Attack Force—sortied from Eniwetok and headed for the Marianas. Waters served as flagship for both TransDiv 12 and TG 52.8, the Eastern Landing Group, administrative and operational organizations, respectively; the same six fast transports made up both organizations.

As she led her task group on the approach to Saipan late in the evening of 14 June, Waters made sonar contact with a submarine. She attacked with depth charges around 2200 and was unable to reestablish the contact after the barrage. Though the evidence did not support crediting her with a confirmed kill, her crew observed an oil slick which suggested that she had at least damaged an enemy submarine. She resumed her place in formation just before 2300 and continued to close Saipan, the northernmost of the Marianas islands.

At 0510, she went to general quarters in anticipation of the landing and moved into the transport area off the lower portion of Saipan's western coast. She received orders to patrol 2,000 yards (1.8 km) to seaward of the transport area, and she led TransDiv 12 to that station at around 0715. The assault force hit the beaches at about 0845, but Waters' complement of marines remained embarked throughout the day and the night of 15 and 16 June while she screened the transport area. She closed the transports once—at 1835—to help repel an air attack and, later, screened them during night retirement.

A little after 0800 on 16 June, Waters and the other APDs of TransDiv 12 closed the Charon Kanoa beaches and disembarked their troops—members of the 1st Battalion, 2nd Marine Regiment—originally intended for a secondary landing on the eastern coast at Magicienne Bay but landed at the main beachhead because of unexpectedly stiff resistance ashore and an impending battle at sea. She completed debarking marines by 0858 and formed her division in column to take up screening station for the transports. The fast transport reached her assigned position at 1330 and relieved Bagley.

She remained off Saipan until late June, shepherding the transports of TF 51. During that time, she helped repel several air attacks but did not actually participate in the great air battle of the Philippine Sea fought on 19 and 20 June 1944. Before departing the Marianas on 2 July, the warship also made two unsuccessful attacks on enemy submarines and bombarded Japanese positions on Tinian.

On 2 July, the fast transport cleared the Marianas to escort TG 51.4 to Eniwetok. She reached her destination two days later and, after a 48-hour layover, exited the lagoon to return to the Marianas. Waters resumed patrols of the transport area off Saipan upon her arrival there on 12 July. That night, she delivered night illumination and harassment fire on Tinian near Tinian Town, probably to discourage any attempt by the Japanese on that island to reinforce their comrades in the Saipan garrison. She resumed antisubmarine patrols the next day, and on 14 July, she departed the Marianas once more—this time to escort Patuxent and Sea Cat to Eniwetok. After reaching Eniwetok on 17 July, the warship spent the next 11 days undergoing repairs and then stood out of the lagoon on 28 July to screen another task unit on its voyage to Saipan. She arrived in the Marianas two days later, parted company with the task unit, and entered the anchorage off Guam, which American forces had invaded while the fast transport was at Eniwetok.

Following three days of screening transports in Agat Bay, she joined a task unit built around the battleships Colorado and Pennsylvania. Waters reached Eniwetok on 6 August, remained overnight, and then steamed out of the lagoon to escort Colorado to Pearl Harbor.

Waters arrived in Pearl Harbor on 12 August but departed again six days later. On 22 August, she entered San Francisco. After six weeks of repairs and modifications, the fast transport left San Francisco on 7 October to return to Hawaii. Upon arrival in Pearl Harbor on 14 October, she began additional repairs in preparation for training with underwater demolition teams (UDT) which she began at the end of October. She completed that training by the beginning of January 1945 and, on 10 January, departed Pearl Harbor with TG 52.11, built around the battleships Texas and Nevada. The task group reached Ulithi Atoll on 23 January, and Waters remained until 10 February when she got underway to join in the assault on Iwo Jima. She arrived in the Marianas on 12 February, conducted rehearsals at Saipan and Tinian, and continued on to the Bonin-Volcano group two days later.

==== 1945 ====
She arrived off Iwo Jima on the morning of 16 February as part of the screen for the fire support group. During the three days before the actual invasion, Waters protected the bombardment battleships from enemy submarines and supported the UDTs in their preinvasion reconnaissance of Iwo Jima's beaches. On the day of the assault, she joined the transports and screened them during the landings. The warship remained in the vicinity of Iwo Jima until the first week in March, supporting UDT operations and patrolling against Japanese submarines. On 5 March, the high-speed transport cleared the area with TransDiv 33 and a four-ship screen and headed for Guam. She remained at Guam for a day and a night, arriving there early on 8 March and departing again the next day. She entered Ulithi again on 11 March and began preparations for the last campaign of World War II—Operation Iceberg, the assault on Okinawa.

Following ten days in Ulithi lagoon, Waters steamed out of the atoll on 21 March and joined TG 54.2, part of Rear Admiral M. L. Deyo's Gunfire and Covering Force, for the voyage to the Ryukyus. During the approach for the preinvasion bombardment on 26 March, Waters fired upon a "Val" which tried to crash into Gilmer. Though she claimed no kill, Waters' antiaircraft battery was probably instrumental in deflecting that kamikaze's aim and causing him to miss his target by a mere 75 yards (69 m). Over the four days before the landings, she screened the "old" battleships while they softened up Okinawa's defenses and supported UDT reconnaissance missions and demonstrations along the Okinawa coastline. Late on the 31st, she joined Tractor Group "Fox" to cover its approach to the beaches on the following morning.

During the first week of the assault, she conducted patrols off those same beaches. On 6 April, she teamed up with Morris to splash a "Betty". Early that evening, a kamikaze crashed Morris, and Waters rushed to her assistance, helping to control the fires that blazed on board the destroyer for two hours. Two days later, Waters entered Kerama Retto for fuel and to await reassignment. The following day, she received orders to screen Mine Squadron (MinRon) 3 and, for the remainder of the month, supported minesweeping operations. On 3 May, she took up familiar duty protecting the transport area from submarines, but that assignment proved to be a brief one.

The following day, she joined the escort of a Ulithi-bound convoy. On 6 May, she and Herbert were diverted to Leyte Gulf, where they arrived on the 8th. There, they picked up a convoy of LSTs and shepherded them back to Okinawa, arriving on the 15th. After four days at Okinawa—punctuated by frequent Japanese air attacks, she departed once again in the escort of a convoy bound for Saipan. The fast transport reached her destination on 24 May, underwent repairs, and shifted to Guam on 5 June to unload her UDT equipment. From Guam, she moved to Ulithi for another week of repairs from 6 to 13 June. On 17 June, the warship returned to Okinawa with another convoy and, after two days at Kerama Retto, cleared the Ryukyus for the last time.

During this voyage, which ultimately took her home, she fired her last shot in anger on 24 June when she dropped a barrage of depth charges on an underwater sound contact. Following the attack, she lost contact and continued on her way. After stops at Saipan, Eniwetok, and Pearl Harbor, the warship finally hauled into San Pedro, California, on 21 July. Soon after her arrival, she began an extensive overhaul at the Western Steel & Pipe Company. On 2 August, she resumed her former classification as a destroyer and became DD-115 once again. The war ended on 14 August while she was still in the yard; and, in September, she was moved to Terminal Island, and the overhaul became preinactivation preparations. On 12 October 1945, the veteran of two world wars was decommissioned at Terminal Island. Her name was struck from the Navy list on 24 October 1945, and she was sold for scrapping on 10 May 1946.

Waters received seven battle stars for service during World War II.

== Bibliography ==
- Wright, C. C. (2003). "Question 40/02: Submarines Expended as Targets 1922". Warship International. XL (4): 286–298. ISSN 0043-0374.
