= Daniel Waters =

Daniel Waters may refer to:

- Daniel Waters (minuteman) (1731–1816), officer in the Continental Navy and the United States Navy
- Daniel Waters (novelist) (born 1969), American author of young adult novels
- Daniel Waters (screenwriter) (born 1962), American screenwriter and film director
- Dan Waters, politician in Ontario, Canada

== See also ==
- Daniel Walters (disambiguation)
- Daniel Watters (born 1971), American swimmer
