= Barbara E. Ward =

British anthropologist

Barbara E Ward
- Born: 2 January 1919; Nottingham, England
- Died: 1983 (64 Years Old)
- Education: The London School of Economics
- Occupation: Social Anthropologist

Barbara E. Ward (1919–1983) was a British social anthropologist and academic, who specialized in sinological anthropology.

== Life ==
Ward was born 2 January 1919 in Nottingham, England. She studied history at Newnham College, an all-women's college of the University of Cambridge. She then attended the University of London, where she gained a diploma in education (a teaching qualification) in 1942. For the next five years she taught in England and West Africa. While teaching in Ghana, she became interested in social anthropology. In 1949, she completed a master's degree from the London School of Economics having studied the Ewe speaking people of Ghana.

In 1950, Ward moved to Hong Kong where she focused her attention to the fishing community. For three years, she spent performing field work among the Kau Sai group in the Eastern New Territories. She taught sociology at Chinese University of Hong Kong, rising to the rank of reader.

In 1973, she was invited to act as the head of the International Institute for Environmental Affairs. However she only agreed on the condition that the name be changed to the International Institute for Environment and Development to which it still remains today.

During her academic career, she lectured at the University of London, Cornell University, the University of Cambridge, and the Chinese University of Hong Kong.

At the end of her life she was preparing a book on the boat people of Hong Kong.

== Selected works ==
- Ward, Barbara E. (1957). The Interplay of East and West: Elements of Contrast and Co-Operation. George Allen & Unwin.
- Ward, Barbara E. (1963). Women in the new Asia: the changing social roles of men and women in South and South-east Asia. Paris: UNESCO.
- Ward, Barbara E.; Law, Joan (1982). Chinese festivals in Hong Kong. Hong Kong: China Books & Periodicals. ISBN 978-9621000026.
- Ward, Barbara E. (1985). Through Other Eyes. Hong Kong: Chinese University. ISBN 978-9622013247.
- Ward, Barbara E. (1985). "Kau Sai, an Unfinished Manuscript" (PDF). Journal of the Royal Asiatic Society Hong Kong Branch. 25: 27–118. ISSN 1991-7295.
