= City College Norwich =

Sixth Form college in Norwich, Norfolk, England

Location
- Ipswich Road; Norwich, Norfolk, NR2 2LJ; England; 52.618°N 1.287°E

Information
- Type: Further education college
- Established: 1891; 135 years ago
- Department for Education URN: 130764 Tables
- Ofsted: Reports
- Gender: Co-educational
- Website: www.ccn.ac.uk

City College Norwich is a college of further and higher education in Norfolk, England. It is one of the largest colleges in the country. The College has expanded in recent years following mergers with Easton College in 2020 and Paston College in North Walsham in 2017.

== Overview ==
City College Norwich has over 11,000 students on a wide range of full and part-time courses for young people and adults. These include around 1,000 students on higher education courses and 1,500 learners on Apprenticeships.

The College can trace its origins back to 1891 when the first Technical School in Norwich was opened. City College Norwich moved to its current site on Ipswich Road, in Norwich, Norfolk, England, in 1953. The college also has a site at Norfolk House in Norwich city centre, which is home to its School of Higher Education.

In its most recent inspections, in 2013, 2017, 2021 and 2024, City College Norwich was graded as 'Good' by Ofsted. Its provision for learners with high needs is rated as 'Outstanding'.

In 2009 the College won a Queen's Anniversary Prize for Higher and Further Education for its work with students with Autism The College's RUGroom provides a safe haven and a social and study space for students with AS and other Autistic Spectrum Disorders. The unique ingredient has been the involvement of the College's AS learners – who named themselves "The Really Useful Group" – in the design of an AS friendly physical environment which developed into the RUGroom. The RUGroom was opened in February 2008 by Charles Clarke, a member of parliament at the time.

In 2010, the College's Students' Union was a runner-up in the NUS Further Education Union of the Year award.

== Campuses ==
The College's main campus in Norwich is located close to the city centre on Ipswich Road. The Norwich Building was opened in 1953 and other buildings have been opened at various times since. A planned redevelopment of the entire Ipswich Road site did not go ahead due to mismanagement of a college building programme by the Learning and Skills Council in 2009. Despite this setback, the college site has undergone substantial redevelopment in recent years, with a new £5.7M Creative Arts Building and the redevelopment of Broadland Drive which included a new centre for learners with Profound and Multiple Learning Disabilities.

The Ipswich Road campus is also home to the Debut Restaurant, based within the College's Hotel School, which is open to the public during term time. Members of the public can also visit the College's Solutions Hair Salon and Beauty Salon and Solutions Gym. There is also a theatre on campus, Platform Theatre, which stages regular productions by music, musical theatre, dance and acting students.

The College also has a site at Norfolk House in the centre of Norwich, where University of East Anglia-validated degrees and other Higher Education programmes are taught. Courses in Aviation Engineering, and a degree in Professional Aviation Engineering Practice, are taught at the International Aviation Academy Norwich (IAAN), at Norwich Airport. A shop "Ego", staffed by the College's retail students, opened in 2011, giving retail students the opportunity to experience the full range of roles within a real working environment. A £9m building for digital skills training is due to open in 2020-21.

Provision at Paston College in North Walsham is based on two sites in the heart of the town, the Griffons and the Lawns.

Easton College, located in the village of Easton, occupies over 200 hectares of countryside. Facilities include a working farm, Equestrian Centre, and Easton Tennis Centre

== Principal ==
The principal of City College Norwich is Jerry White, being appointed in the summer for 2022 taking over from Corrienne Peasgood. Peasgood worked as a lecturer, senior lecturer, director, vice principal, deputy principal and acting principal, before taking over as principal of the college from Dick Palmer in 2012. Palmer went on to lead the TEN Group as its chief executive from 2012 to 2017.

== Notable alumni ==
- Tom Aikens – professional and Michelin starred chef
- Franklin Allen – economist
- Sam Claflin – actor
- Stephen Fry – comedian and actor
- Sigala - musician
- Rodolfo González – motor racing driver
- Alfie Hewett – wheelchair tennis player
- Jon McGregor – novelist and short story writer
- Derek Rayner, Baron Rayner – former CEO of Marks and Spencer
- Deric Daniel Waters – educator, scholar of building science and heritage conservationist
- Beth Orton - musician
- Peter Jay and the Jaywalkers - music group formed by students
