= Chan Shun-hing =

Hong Kong professor

Chan Shun-hing (Chinese: 陳慎慶) is a professor in the Department of Religion and Philosophy at Hong Kong Baptist University, known for his research on the intersection between Christianity and social movements in Hong Kong.

== Biography ==
Chan obtained both his Bachelor of Arts in Music (1983) and Master of Divinity at the Chinese University of Hong Kong (1986). Upon the completion of his MDiv, he went to New College, University of Edinburgh, to do a Master of Theology and graduated in 1987. He finished his PhD in Sociology at the Chinese University of Hong Kong in 1996 and joined Department of Religion and Philosophy in the Hong Kong Baptist University that year as an assistant professor. He is promoted to professor since 2014.

He is outspoken in terms of the progress of democracy in Hong Kong and its relation to Christianity. He is actively involved in the Hong Kong Democratic Development Network, a non-governmental organisation that helps promote democracy in Hong Kong. His articles also appear in pro-democratic outlets such as Apple Daily.

He is currently a member of the Advisory Panel of Radio Television Hong Kong.

== Works ==
- Chan Shun-hing and Jonathan Wilson Johnson, eds (2021). Citizens of Two Kingdoms: Civil Society and Christian Religion in Greater China. Leiden: Brill. ISBN 9789004459373
- Leung, Beatrice and Chan Shun-hing (2003). Changing Church and State Relations in Hong Kong, 1950-2000. Hong Kong: Hong Kong University Press. ISBN 9789622096127
