= Daniel Walters =

Daniel or Dan(ny) Walters may refer to:

- Danny Walters (American football) (born 1960), American football player
- Nathaniel Walters (1875–1956), commonly known as Danny Walters, rugby player
- Danny Walters (actor) (born 1993), British actor
- Dan Walters (1966–2020), baseball player

== See also ==
- Daniel Waters (disambiguation)
