= Patrick Hase =

Hong Kong historian

Patrick Hugh Hase (Chinese: 夏思義) is a historian specialised in the history of the New Territories, Hong Kong. He is a retired civil servant of Hong Kong under the British governance, living there from 1972 to present (as of 2020).

== Biography ==
Patrick Hase started working in Hong Kong in 1972. In the first six months of his arrival, the Hong Kong Government assigned him to study Cantonese, eventually he became fluent in it. In the 1980s, he worked as the District Officer of Sha Tin District. He retired as Assistant Director of Social Welfare in 1996.

== Bibliography ==
Patrick Hase's bibliography includes:

Books

- Hase, P. H., ed. (1999). In the Heart of the Metropolis: Yaumatei and its People. Joint Publishing. ISBN 9789620417474.
- Hase, Patrick H. (2008). The Six-Day War of 1899: Hong Kong in the Age of Imperialism. Hong Kong: Hong Kong University Press. ISBN 9789622098992.
- Hase, Patrick H. (2013). Custom, Land and Livelihood in Rural South China: The Traditional Land Law of Hong Kong's New Territories, 1750-1950. Royal Asiatic Society Hong Kong Studies Series. Hong Kong University Press. ISBN 978-988-8139-08-8.
- Hase, Patrick H. (2017). Forgotten Heroes: San On County and its Magistrates in the Late Ming and Early Qing. City University of Hong Kong Press. ISBN 9789629373061.
- Hase, P. H. (2020). Settlement, Life, and Politics - Understanding the Traditional New Territories. Royal Asiatic Society Hong Kong studies series. City University of Hong Kong Press. ISBN 9789629374419.
- Hase, Patrick H. (November 2024). Villages and Market Towns in Hong Kong: Settlement and History. The Chinese University of Hong Kong Press. ISBN 9789882373174.

Book chapters

- Hase, Patrick H.; Lee, Man-Yip (1992). "Chapter 5: Sheung Wo Hang Village, Hong Kong: A Village Shaped by Fengshui". In Knapp, Ronald G. (ed.). Chinese Landscapes: The Village As Place. University of Hawaii Press. pp. 79–94. ISBN 9780824814137.
- Hase, Patrick (1995). "Alliance of Ten". In Faure, David; Siu, Helen (eds.). Down to Earth : The Territorial Bond in South China. Stanford, California: Stanford University Press. pp. 123–160. ISBN 978-0-8047-2434-0. OCLC 31815055.

Journal articles

- Hase, Patrick (1981). "Notes on Rice Farming in Shatin" (PDF). Journal of the Royal Asiatic Society Hong Kong Branch. 21: 196–206. ISSN 1991-7295.
- Hase, Patrick H. (1983). "Old Hau Wong Temple, Tai Wai, Sha Tin" (PDF). Journal of the Royal Asiatic Society Hong Kong Branch. 23: 233–240. ISSN 1991-7295.
- Hase, Patrick H.; Hayes, James; Iu, K.C. (1984). "Traditional Tea Growing in the New Territories" (PDF). Journal of the Royal Asiatic Society Hong Kong Branch. 24: 264–281. ISSN 1991-7295.
- Hase, Patrick (1988). "A Traditional New Territories Latrine" (PDF). Journal of the Royal Asiatic Society Hong Kong Branch. 28: 222–226. eISSN 1991-7287. ISSN 0085-5774.
- Hase, P.H. (1989). "Cheung Shan Kwu Tsz, An Old Buddhist Nunnery in the New Territories and its Place in Local Society" (PDF). Journal of the Royal Asiatic Society Hong Kong Branch. 29: 121–157. ISSN 1991-7295.
- Hase, P.H. (1990). "Ta Kwu Ling, Wong Pui Ling and the Kim Hau Bridges" (PDF). Journal of the Royal Asiatic Society Hong Kong Branch. 30: 257–265. ISSN 1991-7295.
- Hase, P.H. (1990). "A Village War in Sham Chun" (PDF). Journal of the Royal Asiatic Society Hong Kong Branch. 30: 265–281. ISSN 1991-7295.
- Hase, P.H. (1990). "Sha Tau Kok in 1853" (PDF). Journal of the Royal Asiatic Society Hong Kong Branch. 30: 281–297. ISSN 1991-7295.
- Hase, Patrick H. (1992). "Bandits in the Siu Lek Yuen Yeuk" (PDF). Journal of the Royal Asiatic Society Hong Kong Branch. 32: 214–215. ISSN 1991-7295.
- Hase, P.H. (1993). "Eastern Peace: Sha Tau Kok Market in 1925" (PDF). Journal of the Royal Asiatic Society Hong Kong Branch. 33: 147–202. ISSN 1991-7295.
- Hase, Patrick (1996). "Traditional Life in the New Territories: The Evidence of the 1911 and 1921 Censuses" (PDF). Journal of the Royal Asiatic Society Hong Kong Branch. 36. ISSN 1991-7295.
- Hase, P.H. (1999). "Beside the Yamen: Nga Tsin Wai Village" (PDF). Journal of the Royal Asiatic Society Hong Kong Branch. 39: 1–82.
- Hase, Patrick (June 2003). The Historical Heritage of Ho Chung, Pak Kong, and Sha Kok Mei, Sai Kung (PDF) (article). S.Y. Consultancy Services Co. Ltd.

== Distinctions ==
- PhD, University of Cambridge
- Former President, Royal Asiatic Society Hong Kong Branch
