= Li Long Lam =

Hong Konger field archaeologist

- Citizenship: Hongkonger

Academic background
- Education: Jilin University (Ph.D.); University of London (M.A.); Wuhan University (B.H.)
- Doctoral advisor: Zhang Zhongpei

Academic work
- Discipline: Archaeology
- Institutions: Hong Kong Antiquities and Monuments Office, University of Chinese Academy of Sciences, Hong Kong Archaeological Society
- Main interests: History of Hong Kong, salt industry

Chinese name
- Chinese: 李浪林
Transcriptions
Standard Mandarin
- Hanyu Pinyin: Lǐ Lànglín

Professor Li Long Lam (Chinese: 李浪林; Mandarin: Li Lang Lin) is an experienced coastal and field archaeologist in Hong Kong. Graduated with a Bachelor of History at Wuhan University, he later received his master's degree at the University of London and his Doctor of Philosophy in Archaeology at Jilin University. He worked in Shenzhen before coming to Hong Kong to work at the Antiquities and Monument Office. From1988-2018, he worked in Hong Kong for over 30 years. In 1994, when Prof Li participated in the excavation in Kowloon Walled City, he discovered two stone-pieces (inscribed with Chinese characters 'North Door' and 'Kowloon Walled City') that are still on display near the Kowloon Walled City Park nowadays. Before his retirement in 2018, Dr. Li was a Curator at the Hong Kong Antiquities and Monuments Office. He is now a visiting professor at University of Chinese Academy of Sciences. Since 2021, he is appointed as the President of the Committee at the Hong Kong Archaeological Society.

== Academic Research ==
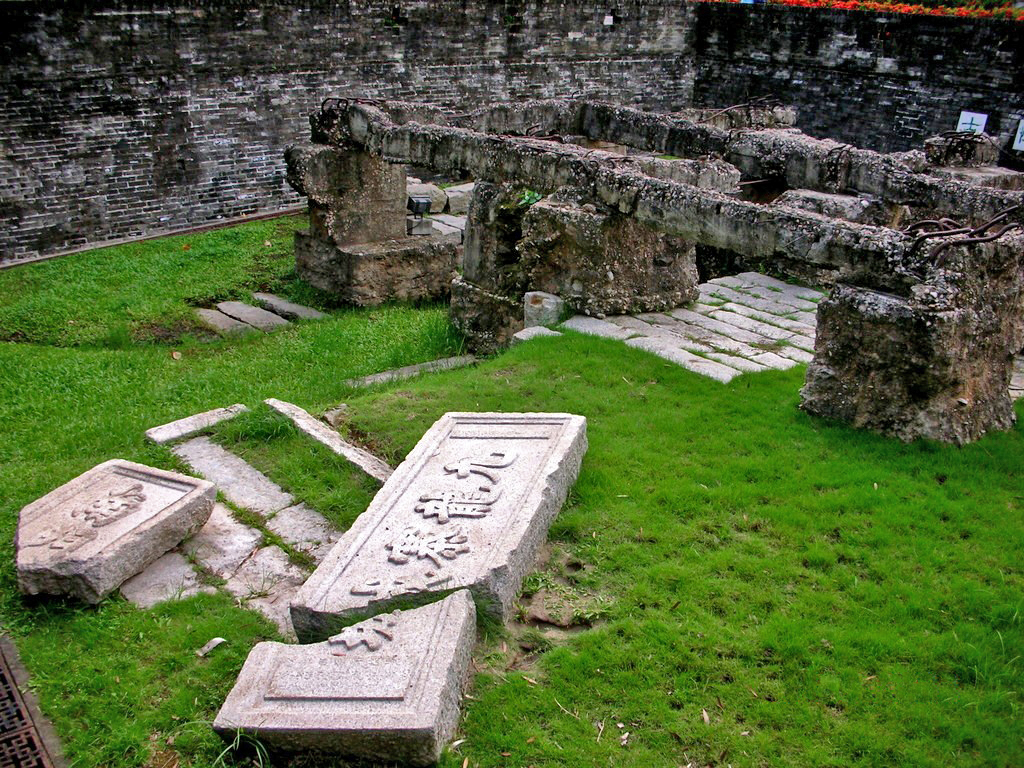
Remnants of Kowloon Walled City's South Gate and its entrance plaques excavated by Li.

Li is famous for his study in Hong Kong pre-modern salt industry and coastal archaeology. Back in the 20th Century, there had been numerous sites of industry excavated along Hong Kong coastlines. The sites were believed to be lime or ceramic kilns by that time. Li was the first to argue that a number of sites are not kilns but stoves to produce salt. His argument alters the understanding of Hong Kong economic status in fifth to tenth Century Southeast Asia and eventually earned him a seat at the University of Chinese Academy of Sciences.

Li also participated in multiple important excavations, including the Kowloon Walled City excavation in 1994, the Tai Fu Tai Mansion project in 2001, a widely concerned Mong Kok excavation in 2004, and the Chi Ma Wan excavation.
