= James Hayes (historian) =

Hong Kong historian (1930–2023)

James William Hayes (8 November 1930 – 6 July 2023) was a Hong Kong historian and civil servant.

== Education ==
James Hayes held a BA from Queen Mary College, University of London, and an MA in history. He completed a Ph.D. from the University of London's School of Oriental and African Studies (SOAS) in 1975.

== Biography ==
James Hayes worked in Hong Kong's New Territories for almost half his thirty-two years of government service. He joined the British Hong Kong government as Cadet Officer Class II in 1956. He retired as Regional Secretary of the New Territories in 1987. He wrote extensively on the history and anthropology of the New Territories.

Hayes died on 6 July 2023, at the age of 92.

== Bibliography ==
James Hayes' bibliography includes:

Books

- Hayes, James (1977). The Hong Kong region, 1850-1911: institutions and leadership in town and countryside. Archon Books. ISBN 9780208016263.
- Hayes, James (1983). The rural communities of Hong Kong: studies and themes. Oxford University Press. ISBN 9780195815047.
- Hayes, James (1993). Tsuen Wan: Growth of a 'new Town' and its People. Oxford University Press. ISBN 9780195851663.
- Hayes, James (1996). Friends & teachers: Hong Kong and its people, 1953-87. Hong Kong University Press. ISBN 9789622093966.
- Hayes, James (2001). South China Village Culture. Oxford University Press. ISBN 9780195919899.
- Hayes, James (2006). The great difference: Hong Kong's New Territories and its people, 1898-2004. Hong Kong University Press. ISBN 9789622097940.

Book chapters

- Hayes, James (1964). "The Settlement and Development of a Multiple-clan Village". In Topley, Marjorie (ed.). Aspects of Social Organization in the New Territories (PDF). Hong Kong: Cathay Press. pp. 10–15. OCLC 56615727. Archived from the original on 14 April 2018. "Royal Asiatic Society Hong Kong Branch. Weekend Symposium. 9th-10th May, 1964"
- Hayes, James (1977). "Chapter 4: A Multilineage Settlement of Cantonese Farmers". The Hong Kong Region, 1850 to 1911: Institutions and Leadership in Town and Countryside. Archon Books. ISBN 9780208016263.
- Hayes, James (1985). "Chapter 3: Specialists and Written Materials in the Village World". In Johnson, David; Nathan, Andrew J.; Rawski, Evelyn S. (eds.). Popular Culture in Late Imperial China. University of California Press. pp. 75–111. doi:10.1525/9780520340121-006.
- Hayes, James W. (1991). "Government and village: Reactions to modern development by long-settled communities in the New Territories of Hong Kong" (PDF). JASO Occasional Paper. Vol. 8. pp. 107–138. Archived from the original on 19 January 2017.
- Hayes, James (15 June 1994). "Chapter 3: San Po Tsai (Little Daughters-in-Law) and Child Betrothals in the New Territories of Hong Kong from the 1890s to the 1960s". In Jaschok, Maria; Miers, Suzanne (eds.). Women and Chinese patriarchy: submission, servitude, and escape. Zed Books. pp. 51–53. ISBN 978-1856491266.
- Hamilton, Eric; Schofield, Walter; Peplow, S. H.; Tsui, Paul; Coates, Austin; Hayes, James (2010). Strickland, John (ed.). Southern District Officer Reports: Islands and Villages in Rural Hong Kong, 1910-60. Hong Kong University Press. ISBN 9789888028382.

Journal articles

- Hayes, James W. (1962). "The Pattern of Life in the New Territories in 1898" (PDF). Journal of the Royal Asiatic Society Hong Kong Branch. 2: 75–102. ISSN 1991-7295.
- Hayes, James W. (1963). "Cheung Chau 1850-1898: Information from Commemorative Tablets" (PDF). Journal of the Royal Asiatic Society Hong Kong Branch. 3: 88–106. ISSN 1991-7295.
- Hayes, James W. (1964). "Peng Chau between 1798 and 1899" (PDF). Journal of the Royal Asiatic Society Hong Kong Branch. 4: 71–96. ISSN 1991-7295.
- Hayes, James (1966). "Old British Kowloon" (PDF). Journal of the Hong Kong Branch of the Royal Asiatic Society. 6: 120–137.
- Hayes, James W. (1969). "Removal of Villages for Fung Shui Reasons. Another Example from Lantau Island, Hong Kong" (PDF). Journal of the Royal Asiatic Society Hong Kong Branch. 9: 156–158. ISSN 1991-7295.
- Hayes, James W. (1970). "The San on Map of Mgr. Volontieri" (PDF). Journal of the Royal Asiatic Society Hong Kong Branch. 10: 193–196. ISSN 1991-7295.
- Hayes, James W. (1970). "A Casualty of the Cultural Revolution" (PDF). Journal of the Royal Asiatic Society Hong Kong Branch. 10: 196–197. ISSN 1991-7295. Archived from the original (PDF) on 14 March 2022.
- Hayes, James (1971). "Visit to the Tung Lin Kok Yuen, and other places on Hong Kong Island" (PDF). Journal of the Royal Asiatic Society Hong Kong Branch. 11: 195–197.
- Hayes, James (1971). "Rope-making and Dyeing/Calendering on Ap Lei Chau, Hong Kong" (PDF). Journal of the Royal Asiatic Society Hong Kong Branch. 11: 199–200.
- Hase, Patrick H.; Hayes, James; Iu, K.C. (1984). "Traditional Tea Growing in the New Territories" (PDF). Journal of the Royal Asiatic Society Hong Kong Branch. 24: 264–281. ISSN 1991-7295.
- Hayes, James (1999). "Feng Shui and Roadworks at Tong Fuk Village, 1958" (PDF). Journal of the Royal Asiatic Society Hong Kong Branch. 39: 255–259. ISSN 1991-7295.
- Hayes, James (2002). "Hong Kong's Chinese associations: Their ceremonial occasions and their helpers" (PDF). Journal of the Royal Asiatic Society Hong Kong Branch. 42: 67–99. ISSN 1991-7295.
- Hayes, James. "Afterthoughts on "South China Village Culture" (Hong Kong: Oxford University Press (China), 2001" (PDF). Journal of the Royal Asiatic Society Hong Kong Branch. 42: 393–398. ISSN 1991-7295.
- Hayes, James (2002). "From rice to riches: A personal journey through a changing China (Jane Hutcheon)" (PDF). Journal of the Royal Asiatic Society Hong Kong Branch. 42: 472–474. ISSN 1991-7295.
- Hayes, James (2012). "Village Literacy and Scholarship: Village Scholars and their Documents". Journal of the Royal Asiatic Society Hong Kong Branch. 52: 77–137. ISSN 1991-7295. JSTOR 23890026.
- Hayes, James (2020). Baker, Hugh D.R. (ed.). A Pattern of Life—Essays on Rural Hong Kong by James Hayes. City University of Hong Kong Press. ISBN 978-962-937-553-9.

== Distinctions ==
- Former President, Royal Asiatic Society Hong Kong Branch (1983–1990)
- Companion of the Imperial Service Order (1986)
- Doctor of Letters honoris causa, The University of Hong Kong (1992)
- Honorary Fellow, The Hong Kong University of Science and Technology (2008)
- Honorary Institute Fellow, Hong Kong Institute for the Humanities and Social Sciences, The University of Hong Kong
