= Royal Asiatic Society Hong Kong Branch =

Organisation for the study of Asia

Royal Asiatic Society Hong Kong Branch is an organisation to encourage interest in Asia broadly, with an emphasis on Hong Kong. The society was founded in 1847 and folded 1859. It was revived on December 28, 1959. Its parent association is the Royal Asiatic Society of Great Britain and Ireland.

The Society is open to all with an interest in the art, literature and culture of China and Asia, with special reference to Hong Kong.

== History ==
In 1847 the Hong Kong branch of the Royal Asiatic Society was founded under its parent society, the Asiatic Society of Great Britain and Ireland. The latter had in turn been founded in 1823 by Sir Henry Thomas Colebrooke and others. In 1824 the Asiatic Society received a Royal Charter from patron King George IV and was charged with ‘the investigation of subjects connected with and for the encouragement of science, literature and the arts in relation to Asia.’ In around 1838, branches were formed in Mumbai and Chennai, and Sri Lanka in 1845. The Hong Kong branch followed in 1847, with further branches in Shanghai, Japan, Malaya, and Korea being founded before the end of the 19th century. The Hong Kong branch folded in 1859, and was revived on 28 December 1959.

The Hong Kong Branch was based upon the structure of the Royal Asiatic Society in London. Sir John F. Davis, Governor of Hong Kong, was asked to be President, more for his interest and learning than for his office. The Society was made a Branch of the Royal Asiatic Society, which Davis had helped to found. The Asiatic Society became the Hong Kong Branch of the Royal Asiatic Society in January 1847.

Davis and his successor Sir John Bowring, also a scholar as well as Governor of Hong Kong, kept the Society active through their personal energy. Early officers of the Society included Thomas Francis Wade, who later created the Wade system of romanization of Chinese. Governor George Bonham granted the Society use of space in the Supreme Court building, but when Bowring left Hong Kong in May 1859 the Society folded. James Legge, as well and later Harry Parkes were not successful in their efforts to revive it. The Hong Kong Branch was resuscitated a century later, on December 28, 1959.

== Publications ==
The original Society published six volumes of Transactions, the first in 1847 and the last in 1859. The revived Society's Journal of the Hong Kong Branch of the Royal Asiatic Society has been placed online by University of Hong Kong. Access is free for issues three years after the publication date.

== People ==
Former presidents include:

- Sir John F. Davis
- Sir John Bowring
- James W. Hayes (1983–1990)
- David Gilkes
- Deric Daniel Waters (1996–2001)
- Patrick Hase
- Robert Nield
- Michael Broom

== See also ==
- Royal Asiatic Society China
