= Daniel Waters (minuteman) =

Daniel Waters (June 20, 1731 – March 26, 1816) was an officer in the Continental Navy and in the United States Navy.

== Biography ==
He was born on June 20, 1731, in Charlestown, Massachusetts, and was one of the "minutemen" who engaged the British at the onset of the American Revolutionary War. Later placed in charge of a small gunboat during the siege of British troops in Boston, Waters was appointed by General George Washington to command the schooner Lee on January 20, 1776. He was soon actively engaged in the ensuing assault upon British communications, capturing one enemy vessel in February and another in May. Aided by Warren, Lee seized an armed troopship with 94 Scottish Highlander troops on board in early June. Later in the month, Waters and Lee shared with other vessels the capture of transports Howe and Annabella.

Again at the recommendation of Washington, Waters was appointed a captain in the Continental Navy on March 15, 1777, and given command of the frigate Fox. Shortly thereafter, Waters and Fox, along with Hancock, were forced to surrender to superior British forces off Halifax, Nova Scotia. Following an exchange in 1778, Waters made a cruise to the West Indies in the spring of 1779 in the Continental sloop General Gates. He then commanded the Massachusetts ship General Putnam in an ill-fated expedition against Castine, Maine, in which the American ships were destroyed in the mouth of the Penobscot River to prevent their capture .

Waters' most famous exploit occurred on Christmas Day, 1779, when he led the Boston privateer Thorn in a successful, two-hour action against two enemy privateers of about equal armament, but more heavily manned. In the fierce fight, during which Governor William Tryon and Sir William Erskine were captured, Waters was wounded. John Adams was to write of this engagement: "There has not been a more memorable action this war."

Waters' last cruise was in the Massachusetts privateer Friendship, to which he was appointed in January 1781. Following the war, Waters retired to his farm in Malden, Massachusetts, where he died on March 26, 1816.

== Namesake ==
USS Waters (DD-115) was named for him.

== See also ==
- Bibliography of early United States naval history
