= Deric Daniel Waters =

British educator and heritage conservationist

Deric Daniel Waters ISO BBS
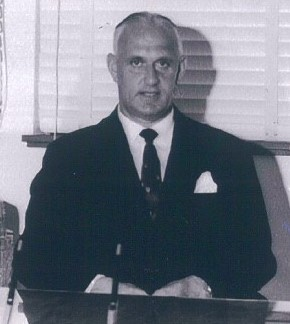

President of the Royal Asiatic Society Hong Kong Branch
- In office 1996–2001

Member of the Antiquities Advisory Board
- In office 1990–1998

Assistant Director (Technical Education) of the Education Department of Hong Kong
- In office 1974–1980

Principal of the Morrison Hill Technical Institute
- In office 1969–1972

Personal details
- Born: 5 November 1920 Norwich, England
- Died: 27 January 2016 (aged 95) Hong Kong
- Spouse: Vera Wateres
- Education: City College Norwich; Loughborough University (MPhil, PhD)
- Civilian awards: Imperial Service Order (1981); Bronze Bauhinia Star (1998); Honorary Fellow, Lingnan University (2014)

Military service
- Allegiance: United Kingdom
- Branch/service: Royal Engineers
- Years of service: 1939-1946
- Unit: 249 Field Company, Royal Engineers
- Military awards: War Medal 1939–1945 with Mention in Despatches; Defence Medal; 1939–1945 Star; Africa Star; Italy Star

Deric Daniel Waters or Dan Waters ISO BBS (Chinese: 華德斯; 5 November 1920 – 27 January 2016) was a British educator, scholar of building science and heritage conservationist. He was the founding principal of the Morrison Hill Technical Institute in Hong Kong from 1969 to 1972, Assistant Director (Technical Education), Education Department of Hong Kong from 1974 to 1980. Waters retired in 1980 and obtained his MPhil from Loughborough University in 1982 and PhD in 1985. He was a Fellow of the Hong Kong Institute of Directors, Fellow of the Chartered Institute of Building, Fellow of the Royal Society for Public Health and an Associate Member of the British Institute of Management.

Waters had served as the President of the Royal Asiatic Society Hong Kong Branch from 1996 to 2001, and remained as an Honorary Fellow of the society. He was appointed as a member of the Antiquities Advisory Board between 1990 and 1998.

Waters was also an author. He published several books about Hong Kong studies and many articles on the Journal of Royal Asiatic Society Hong Kong Branch, as well as articles regarding technical education and building science and conservation.

== Early life and career ==
Waters was born in November 1920 at Norwich, England. During World War II, he had served in the British Army. In 1939, he was conscripted and sent to the 249 Field Company of Royal Engineers, and shipped to North Africa as part of the Eighth Army. After the North African campaign, he was shipped towards Italy. Waters landed on Salerno, Italy during Operation Avalanche. At Salerno he was wounded by landmines. After that he took part in the Battle of Anzio. Waters was mentioned in dispatches for his excellent service during the war. In September 1946, he ended his military service in Trieste and returned to England.

After the war, Waters returned to his family construction company which was established by his great-grandfather in 1853. He became the managing director of the company, in-charge of restoration of old buildings. He also studied at City College Norwich and later taught building science there.

== Education career ==
In autumn 1954, Waters joined the Colonial Service as Education officer (Technical Education). He set sail to Hong Kong by RMS Canton. When he arrived in Hong Kong, the Education Department of Hong Kong assigned him to the Hong Kong Technical College (today's Hong Kong Polytechnic University) located at Wood Road, Wan Chai. He worked as a senior lecturer in the Department of Building. In 1963, Waters was promoted to the Head of Department. In 1969, the Education Department appointed Waters as the founding principal of the Morrison Hill Technical Institute (today's IVE (Morrison Hill)).

In 1972, he was transferred to the Education Department to oversee the establishment of several technical institutes in Hong Kong. From 1974 to 1980, he was Assistant Director (Technical Education) of the department.

Waters retired in 1980 from the Hong Kong Civil Service. One year later he was awarded the Imperial Service Order for his long and meritorious services for the British Empire.

== Study back in England ==
After Water's retirement, he studied at the Department of Education, Loughborough University of Technology. He obtained Master of Philosophy in 1982 and Doctor of Philosophy in 1985. Waters's Master's thesis was entitled "The technical institutes in Hong Kong 1969 to 1980: A study of their development" and his Doctoral thesis was "The planning of craft and technician education in Hong Kong 1957 to 1982".

== Heritage conservation career ==
Waters was a member of the Hong Kong Antiquities Advisory Board between 1990 and 1998.

In 1998, the former Chief Executive of Hong Kong Tung Chee-hwa awarded Waters Bronze Bauhinia Star for his valuable contribution to the work of heritage conservation in Hong Kong and for his long and dedicated service as a member of the Antiquities Advisory Board.

== Personal life and death ==
Waters married Vera Chan Lai-hing on April 21, 1960, at Hong Kong St. Anthony's Church. At 57, Waters earned his black belt in Karate. In January 2006, the Waters held a talk on "One couple two cultures : Western-Chinese couples talk about love and marriage", co-organized by Royal Asiatic Society Hong Kong Branch and Hong Kong Public Libraries, which is recorded in the Hong Kong Oral History Collection of the Library.

On 27 January 2016, Waters died in Hong Kong, at aged 94. A lamp at the lawn near Li Ka Shing Tower of the Hong Kong Polytechnic University was named after him in recognition of his remarkable contribution to education.

== Honours and awards ==
=== Civilian Honours ===
- A Companion of the Imperial Service Order (ISO) (1981)
- The Bronze Bauhinia Star (1998)

=== Institution awards and recognition ===
- Associate Member of the British Institute of Management
- Fellow of the Chartered Institute of Building
- Fellow of the Hong Kong Institute of Directors
- Fellow of the Royal Society for Public Health
- Honorary Fellow of the Royal Asiatic Society
- Honorary Fellow, Lingnan University (2014)
- Construction Industry Honorary Award, Chartered Institute of Building (Hong Kong Branch) (2014)

=== Military Honours ===
- War Medal 1939–1945 with Mention in Despatches
- Defence Medal
- 1939–1945 Star
- Africa Star
- Italy Star

== Publications ==
- Understanding Technical English (1973)
- 21st Century Management: Keeping Ahead of the Japanese and Chinese (1991)
- The Economics and Financing of Hong Kong Education (1992)
- Faces of Hong Kong: An Old Hand's Reflections (1995)
- One couple two cultures : 81 Western-Chinese couples talk about love and marriage (2005)
