= Francis Hubert =

Sir Francis Hubert (died 1629) was an English poet.

== Life ==
He is thought to have been the son of Edward Hubert, one of the six clerks in chancery. Hubert, who appears to have been a member of the Middle Temple, was appointed clerk in chancery 9 March 1601. He was buried at St. Andrew's, Holborn, on 13 December 1629.

== Works ==
A poem by Hubert entitled The Historie of Edward the Second, surnamed Carnarvon, one of our English Kings: together with the fatall Downfall of his two Vnfortunate Favorites, Gaveston and Spencer, was completed in the reign of Elizabeth I of England, but owing to the freedom with which it treated kings, favourites, and affairs of state, a license for its publication was refused. A surreptitious and incorrect edition appeared in 1628, and in the following year Hubert issued the first authentic edition, London, 1629 (other editions, 1631 and 1721), with portrait of the author. Manuscript copies are in the Harleian MSS., Nos. 558 and 2393, the former in the handwriting of Ralph Starkie. Hubert also published ‘Egypt's Favorite. The Historie of Joseph, divided into four parts … Together with Old Israels progresse into the land of Goshen,’ London, 1631.
