= American Medical Society for Sports Medicine =

- Abbreviation: AMSSM
- Formation: 1991
- Legal status: Non-profit
- Purpose: Education, training, standards and advocacy of sports medicine physicians
- Headquarters: Leawood
- Region served: United States
- Members: Doctors (MDs)
- President: Tracy Ray, MD

The American Medical Society for Sports Medicine (AMSSM) is a large sports medicine membership organization, representing over 3000 physicians in the United States, established in 1991. AMSSM includes members who serve as team physicians at the youth level, NCAA, NFL, MLB, NBA, WNBA, MLS, and NHL, as well as Olympic and Paralympic teams.

== Sports medicine practice in the United States ==
Sports medicine is a subspecialty area of medicine in the USA. The AMSSM represents non-surgical sports medicine physicians (MDs) practicing primary care sports medicine. The primary specialty options for non-surgical sports medicine practice in the USA are multiple, including family practice, physiatry, pediatrics, internal medicine and emergency medicine.

Sport and exercise medicine physicians are able to prescribe pharmaceuticals, use diagnostic ultrasound and order other radiological imaging and blood tests, perform minor surgical procedures as well as advise on exercise prescription. Branches of particular interest include concussion in sport and sports cardiology.

The AMSSM is differentiated from other sports medicine organizations in the US as follows:

- The American Orthopaedic Society for Sports Medicine is the primary surgical subspecialty organization for MDs (orthopedic surgeons)
- The American Osteopathic Academy of Sports Medicine is the primary sports medicine organization for DOs.
- The American College of Sports Medicine is the broader organization which includes both physicians and non-physicians, like Athletic Trainers and Exercise Physiologists and other Sports Scientists.

== Position Statements ==
The AMSSM publishes multiple Position Statements including on concussion, cardiac screening of athletes, mental health, cardiac consequences of COVID in sport, ultrasound and sexual violence in sport.

It also shares and endorses consensus statements of/with other organizations.

== History ==
The AMSSM was established in 1991, when sports medicine was officially recognized as a subspecialty branch of medicine in the USA. Past Presidents include Jonathan Drezner, Chad Asplund, Katherine Dec, Cindy Chang, Kimberley Harmon, Robert Dimeff, James Puffer, Doug McKeag and John Lombardo.

== See also ==
- Clinical Journal of Sport Medicine
- FIMS
- British Association of Sport and Exercise Medicine
- Exercise is Medicine
- Australasian College of Sport and Exercise Physicians
- Canadian Academy of Sport and Exercise Medicine
- American Orthopaedic Society for Sports Medicine
- American Medical Society for Sports Medicine official website
