= Sports medicine =

Branch of medicine for training and sports injuries

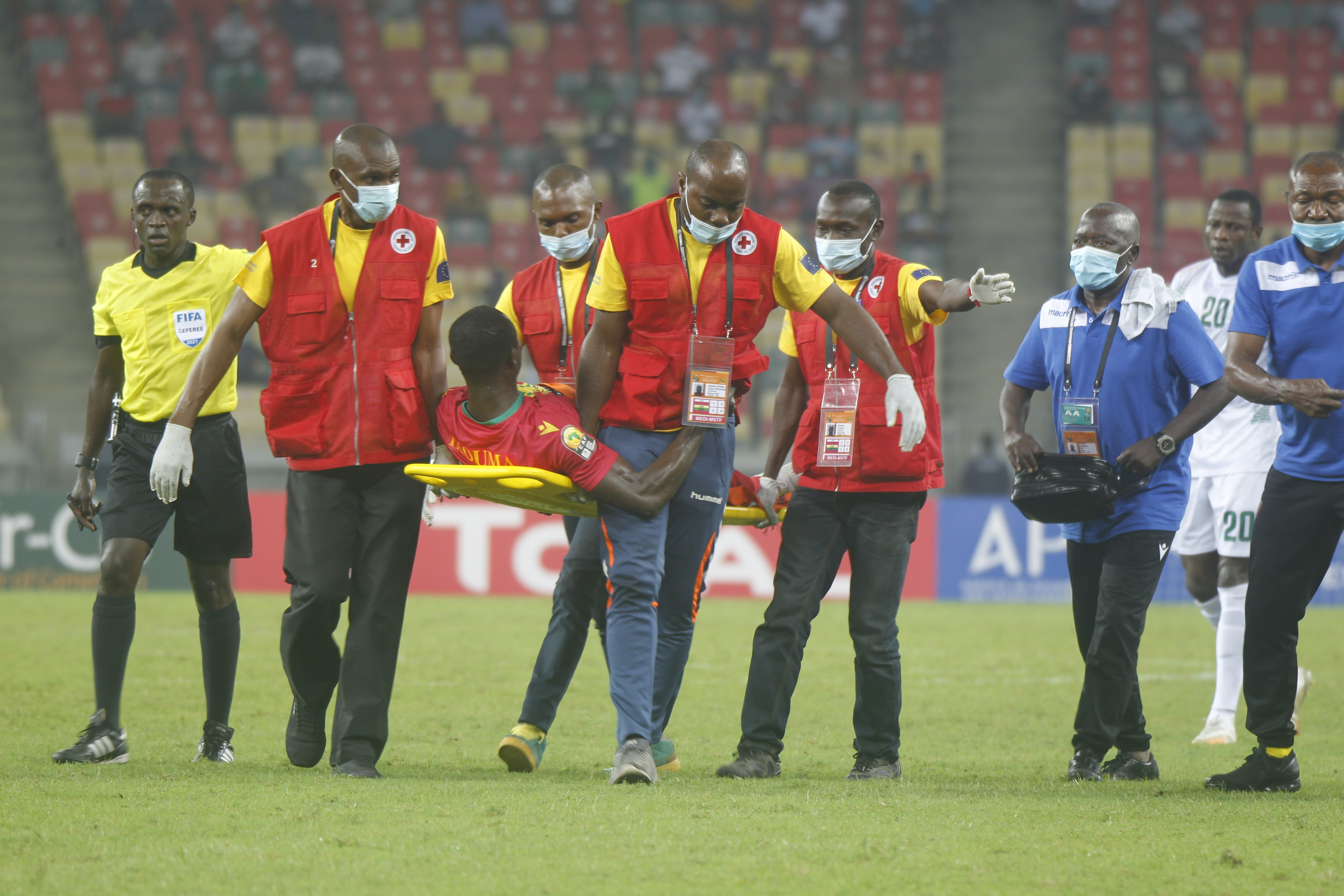
- An injured player is carried from the field during a football match.
- System: Musculoskeletal, cardiovascular
- Focus: Sports especially athletics
- Significant diseases: Trauma; Muscle strain; Concussion; Tendinopathy; Athletic heart syndrome; Sports injuries
- Significant tests: Musculoskeletal tests; ECG; Ultrasound; Cardiac stress test; Projectional radiography
- Specialist: Sports physician
- Glossary: Glossary of medicine

Sports medicine physician, Sport and Exercise Medicine (SEM) physician
Occupation
- Names: Physician
- Occupation type: Specialty
- Activity sectors: Medicine

Description
- Competencies: Exercise prescription, Therapeutic injections
- Education required: Doctor of Medicine (M.D.); Doctor of Osteopathic medicine (D.O.); Bachelor of Medicine, Bachelor of Surgery (M.B.B.S.); Bachelor of Medicine, Bachelor of Surgery (MBChB)
- Fields of employment: Hospitals, Clinics, Professional sports, College athletics, university

Sports medicine is a branch of medicine that deals with physical fitness and the treatment and prevention of injuries related to sports and exercise. Although most sports teams have employed team physicians for many years, it is only since the late 20th century that sports medicine emerged as a distinct field of health care. In over 50 countries, sports medicine (or sport and exercise medicine) is a recognized medical specialty (with similar training and standards to other medical specialties or sub-specialties).

In the majority of countries where sports medicine is recognized and practiced, it is a physician (non-surgical) specialty, but in some (such as the USA), it can equally be a surgical or non-surgical medical specialty, and also a specialty field within primary care. In other contexts, the field of sports medicine encompasses the scope of both medical specialists as well as allied health practitioners who work in the field of sport, such as physiotherapists, athletic trainers, podiatrists and exercise physiologists.

== Scope ==
Sports medicine can refer to the specific medical specialty or subspecialty of several medical and research disciplines in sports. Sports medicine may be called Sport and Exercise Medicine (SEM), which is now well established in many countries. It can broadly also refer to physicians, scientists, trainers, and other paramedical practitioners who work in a broad setting. Sports medicine specialists include a broad range of professions. All sports medicine specialists have one main goal in mind, to heal and rehabilitate injuries for return to everyday life and return to play, as well as to prevent future injuries. They work with all different types of people, and not just athletes. The various sports medicine experts often work together as a team to ensure the best recovery plan for the individual. Team members can include orthopedic surgeons, certified athletic trainers, sports physical therapists, physical medicine and rehabilitation specialists, and specialty SEM physicians. Research within the field is also highly multidisciplinary. A 2023 systematic review noted a 12.1% increase in female authorship in major orthopedic sports medicine journals, with nearly 60% of this growth driven by professionals holding degrees other than an MD.

Specializing in the treatment of athletes and other physically active individuals, SEM physicians have extensive education in musculoskeletal medicine. SEM doctors treat injuries such as muscle, ligament, tendon and bone problems, but may also treat chronic illnesses that can affect physical performance, such as asthma and diabetes. SEM doctors also advise on managing and preventing injuries.

European templates for SEM specialization generally recommend four years of experience in:

- internal medicine with special emphasis on cardiology, emergency medicine and clinical nutrition
- orthopedics and traumatology
- physical and rehabilitation medicine
- fellowship at a recognized sports medicine centre.

=== Related medical specialties ===
- Exercise medicine
- Podiatry
- Sports cardiology
- Emergency medicine
- Lifestyle medicine
- General practice
- Adolescent medicine
- Physical medicine and rehabilitation
- Rheumatology
- Orthopaedic sports medicine
- Pediatrics
- Occupational medicine

== Establishment as a medical specialty ==
=== Historical roots of sports medicine ===
Although sports medicine was only established formally as a specialty in the 20th Century, the history of doctors having involvement in treating athletes goes back to ancient times in Greek, Roman and Egyptian societies.

=== Modern establishment of the specialty ===
Continental European countries were the first to establish medical groups with a focus on sport in the earliest part of the 20th Century. Possibly the earliest establishment of a society of Sports Medicine was the DGSP in Germany in 1912. The Italian version of this page Medicina dello sport states that Sports Medicine societies were first established in Switzerland (1922) followed by France (1929) and Italy (1929) (Italian Sports Medicine Federation). In Germany in the 1920s, an attempt was made to upskill thousands of doctors and other health professionals in sport and exercise medicine, without establishing it as a distinct specialty at that stage, but it failed due to lack of funding in the Depression. Sports medicine was established as a distinct specialty in Italy, the first country to do so, in 1958. The European Union of Medical Specialists has defined necessary training requirements for the establishment of the specialty of Sports Medicine in a given European country. In May 2024, the EU approved cross recognition of sports medicine qualifications between 11 different countries. It is a goal of the European Federation of Sports Medicine Associations to eventually establish Sports Medicine as a specialty in all European countries.

In Australia and New Zealand, Sport and Exercise Medicine (SEM) is a stand-alone medical specialty, with the Australasian College of Sport and Exercise Physicians being one of Australia's 15 recognized medical specialty Colleges. Australia, New Zealand and the UK have been cited as pioneer countries in the establishment of SEM as a stand-alone specialty.

The USA (and many other countries) follow the model of recognizing Sports Medicine as an official subspecialty of multiple other primary medical specialties. The most common primary specialties prior to a sports medicine subspecialty in the USA are family practice, orthopedics and physiatry.

Country	Specialist sports physician association	Fully recognized specialty? (Year)	Training requirements	General sports medicine association
Argentina		Yes	2-year training program	
Australia	Australasian College of Sport and Exercise Physicians	Yes (2009)	4-year training program	Sports Medicine Australia
Austria	Austrian Society of Sports Medicine (OSMV)	Subspecialty	3-year Diploma	
Belarus	Belarus Sports Medicine Association	Yes		
Belgium	The Belgian Federation of Sport and Exercise Medicine	Subspecialty	1 year	
Bosnia Herzegovina	Sports Medicine Association Bosnia Herzegovina	Yes	5 years	
Brazil	Brazilian Society of Exercise and Sports Medicine	Yes	3 years	
Bulgaria	Bulgarian Scientific Society of Sports Medicine and Kinesitherapy	Yes	4 years	
Canada	Canadian Academy of Sport and Exercise Medicine	Subspecialty		
China	Chinese Association of Sports Medicine	Yes		
Croatia	Croatian Sports Medicine Society	Yes		
Cuba		Yes		
Czech Republic	Czech Society of Sports Medicine	Yes	5 years	
Denmark		No		Danish Association of Sports Medicine
Estonia		Yes		
Finland	Finnish Society of Sports Medicine	Yes	5 years	
France	Sport and Exercise Medicine French Association (SFMES)	Yes		
Georgia	Georgian Association of Sports Medicine	Yes		
Germany	German Federation for Sports Medicine (DGSM)	Subspecialty		
Hungary	National Institute for Sports Medicine	Subspecialty		
India	Indian Society of Sports and Exercise Medicine (ISSEM)	Yes (1987 for PG Diploma & 2013 for MD)	2 & 3 years	Indian Association of Sports Medicine & Indian Federation of Sports Medicine
Indonesia	Indonesia Sports Medicine Association (PDSKO)	Yes	3,5 years	Indonesian Sports Health Supervisory Association
Ireland	Faculty of Sports and Exercise Medicine	Yes (2017)		
Israel	Israel Society of Sports Medicine	Yes		
Italy	Federazione Medico Sportiva Italiana (FMSI)	Yes (1958)	5 years	
Japan	Japan Medical Association Certified Sports Health Medical System	Yes (1994)		The Japanese Federation of Physical Fitness & Sports Medicine
Latvia	Latvian Sports Medicine Association	Yes	4 years	
Lithuania		Yes		
Malaysia	College of others (Sports Physician), Academic of Medicine of Malaysia, National Specialist Registrar (NSR)	Yes	4 years	Malaysian Association of Sports Medicine
Malta		Yes		
Mexico		Yes		
Netherlands	Netherlands Association of Sports Medicine NASM – VSG	Yes (2014)	4 years	
New Zealand	Australasian College of Sport and Exercise Physicians	Yes (1998)	4 years	Sports Medicine New Zealand
North Macedonia		Yes		
Norway		No		Norwegian Sports Medicine Association
Poland		Yes		
Portugal	Sociedade Portuguesa de Medicina Desportiva	Yes		
Qatar	ASPETAR	Yes		
Romania		Yes		
Russia	Russian Association of Sports Medicine and Rehabilitation of Patients and the Disabled	Yes	2 years	
Serbia	Sport Medicine Association of Serbia	Yes	3 years	
Singapore		Yes (subspecialty) (2011)	3 years (after primary specialty training)	Sports Medicine Association Singapore (SMAS)
Slovakia	Slovak Society of Sports Medicine	Subspecialty	(6 years)	
Slovenia	Slovenian Sports Medicine Association	Yes		
South Africa	College of Sport and Exercise Medicine of South Africa	Yes (2022)		South Africa Sports Medicine Association (SASMA)
South Korea		Subspecialty		Korean Society of Sports Medicine (KSSM)
Spain	SMD (Sociedad Española de Medicina del Deporte)	Yes	3 years	
Sri Lanka	Sri Lanka Sports Medicine Association	Yes	3 years	
Sweden		No		Swedish Society for Physical Activity and Sports Medicine
Switzerland	Swiss Society for Sports Medicine (SGSM)	Subspecialty		
Turkey	Turkish Sports Medicine Association	Yes		
Ukraine	Ukrainian Sport Medicine and Physical Exercises Specialists Association (USMPESA)	Yes		
United Kingdom	Faculty of Sport and Exercise Medicine UK	Yes (2006)	4 years	British Association of Sport and Exercise Medicine
United States of America	American Medical Society for Sports Medicine; American Orthopaedic Society for Sports Medicine; Physiatric Association of Spine, Sports and Occupational Rehabilitation; American Osteopathic Academy of Sports Medicine	Subspeciality (1994) of: Emergency Medicine; Family Practice; Orthopedics; Pediatrics; Physical Medicine & Rehabilitation	1–2-year Fellowships	American College of Sports Medicine
Uruguay		Yes		

== Public health ==
SEM physicians are frequently involved in promoting the therapeutic benefits of physical activity, exercise and sport for the individuals and communities. SEM Physicians in the UK spend a period of their training in public health, and advise public health physicians on matters relating to physical activity promotion.

== Common sports injuries ==
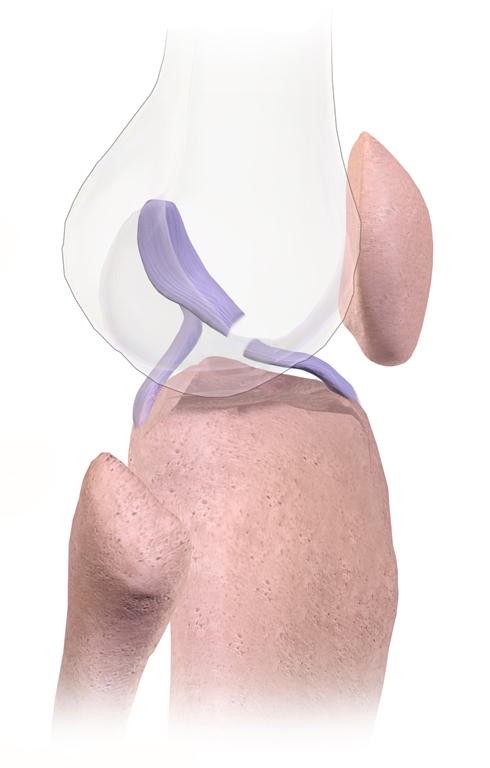
An ACL Tear

Common sports injuries that can result in seeing a sports medicine specialist are knee and shoulder injuries, fractures, ankle sprains, concussions, cartilage injuries, and more. A sports medicine specialist can also be seen for advice in other areas of health, like nutrition, exercise, supplements, and how to prevent injuries before they occur. A sports medicine specialist works to help make the performance of the athlete more advanced, as well as ensuring their safety while performing the activity. Sports injuries generally affect soft tissue or bones within the body and are commonly treated without surgery.

== Treatment for sports injuries ==
Different types of sports injuries require different treatments and major injuries involve surgery, but most do not. Common treatments include medication, such as pain relievers or anti-inflammatory medication, icing, physical therapy, and/or immobilization of the injured area. Physical therapy is used to get the injured area back into regular movements and to reduce the discomfort of the affected area. PRICE is an acronym that is used for the common treatment of these injuries. It stands for protection, rest, ice, compression, and elevation.

== Prevention of injuries ==
Sport injuries can be prevented or reduced in severity through well-designed physical therapy. Examples can include structured strength and conditioning programs that strengthens stabilizing joints and muscles to prevent sprains, and the core and upper torso muscles to build up the rib cage's resilience to prevent or attenuate rib fractures and contusions during sporting incidents. In addition, nutritional guidance, mental conditioning, and regular monitoring and assessments can help optimize an athlete's recovery and improve their self-awareness in knowing when they are pushing their bodies too hard and to make informed decisions during training and competition.

== Controversies in sports medicine ==
=== Concussion in sport ===
The management of concussion in sport has been extremely controversial over the past 20 years due to the discovery and reporting of Chronic traumatic encephalopathy as a disease that is common in ex-athletes, particularly footballers. Sporting codes have been accused of being complicit in understating the long-term damage caused by concussions by allowing too many head impacts to occur and for the players to be able to return to play too quickly after received concussions. A seminal series of consensus papers has been the international guidelines on the management of concussion in sport. These consensus statements have been seen on the positive side as being sports medicine leaders moving the management of concussion in a more conservative direction over time and encouraging a standard set of tests and assessments. On the negative side, they have been seen as conflicted and allowing return to play too rapidly.

=== Transgender people in sport ===
A social debate exists over where transgender athletes should compete when it comes to single-gender competitive or professional sports teams. A movement led by conservatives has contributed to sports bans for trans athletes on local, national, and international levels. Scientific studies have shown similar levels of fitness between female cisgender and female transgender athletes.

=== Drugs in sport ===
Doping in sport has a long history with doctors in the sports medicine world being both heroes and villains on different occasions. The presence of trained sports medicine professionals at elite sporting events has been critical in the fight against doping, but sometimes doctors become the enablers of doping and are part of the scandal themselves.

=== Sports scandals involving medicine ===
Major scandals where doctors were prominent include:

- Bloodgate
- USA Gymnastics sex abuse scandal
- Operación Puerto doping case
- Biogenesis scandal
- Eva Carneiro scandal, involving Chelsea F.C. and José Mourinho

== Allied health team members ==
Different medical professionals for sports injuries require different forms of training, but for sports injuries, they mainly all work with the diagnosis and treatment of these injuries. All sports medicine professionals work with people of all age ranges, professional athletes, or even adolescents playing any sport. The main two allied health professions for sports injuries are athletic trainers (in the USA) and physical therapists (physiotherapists) in most other countries.

=== Athletic trainer ===
Athletic trainers are typically part of a sports medicine team in the US in particular, providing primary care, injury and illness prevention, wellness promotion, emergency care, therapeutic intervention and rehabilitation to injuries. When an athlete is injured, an athletic trainer is key to treatment and rehabilitation working closely with the athlete throughout rehabilitation. Athletic trainers are often the ones who assess the injury first and provide initial care.

=== Physiotherapist ===
Physiotherapists are a primary sports medicine team member in most countries of the world. Physiotherapists can specialize in many areas with sports physiotherapy as a major subspecialty. Physiotherapists are a main factor in the recovery stage of an injury as they set up an individualized recovery plan. Physiotherapy is underfunded within most health systems so that it is generally much more accessible in higher-income countries and, even within these countries, is much more accessible to higher-income earners. In countries like Denmark and Australia there are many more physiotherapists than in lower-income countries.

=== Podiatrist ===
Podiatrists treat issues related to the foot or ankle, which is a common area where athletes get injuries. They specialize in the diagnosis and treatment of foot-related issues by performing tests and referring physical therapists. Podiatrists can also perform surgeries or prescribe medication as forms of treatment.

=== Other practitioners ===
Exercise physiologists, strength and conditioning coaches, personal trainers, chiropractors, osteopaths, sports psychologists, and sports nutritionists or dietitians can be part of the sports medicine team.

== Journals ==
Journal	Established	Scimago Ranking	Region/country	Publisher
British Journal of Sports Medicine	1964	4.329	United Kingdom	BMJ Group
American Journal of Sports Medicine	1972	3.021	United States	SAGE Publishing
Knee Surgery, Sports Traumatology, Arthroscopy	1992	1.806	Germany; Europe	Springer Science+Business Media
Medicine & Science in Sports & Exercise	1969	1.703	United States	Lippincott Williams & Wilkins
Clinical Journal of Sport Medicine	1990	0.990	Canada	Lippincott Williams & Wilkins
Journal of Science and Medicine in Sport	1984	1.724	Australia	Elsevier
The Physician and Sportsmedicine	1973	0.651	United States	Informa Healthcare
Research in Sports Medicine	1988	1.397		Routledge
Sports Health	2009	1.212	United States	SAGE Publications
Exercise and Sport Sciences Reviews	2000	1.945	United States	Lippincott Williams & Wilkins
The Journal of Strength and Conditioning Research	1987	1.569	United States	Lippincott Williams & Wilkins

== See also ==
- Exercise physiology
- Physical therapy
- Sports injuries
- Infectious diseases (athletes)
