= Exercise medicine =

Branch of medicine as it relates to Exercise

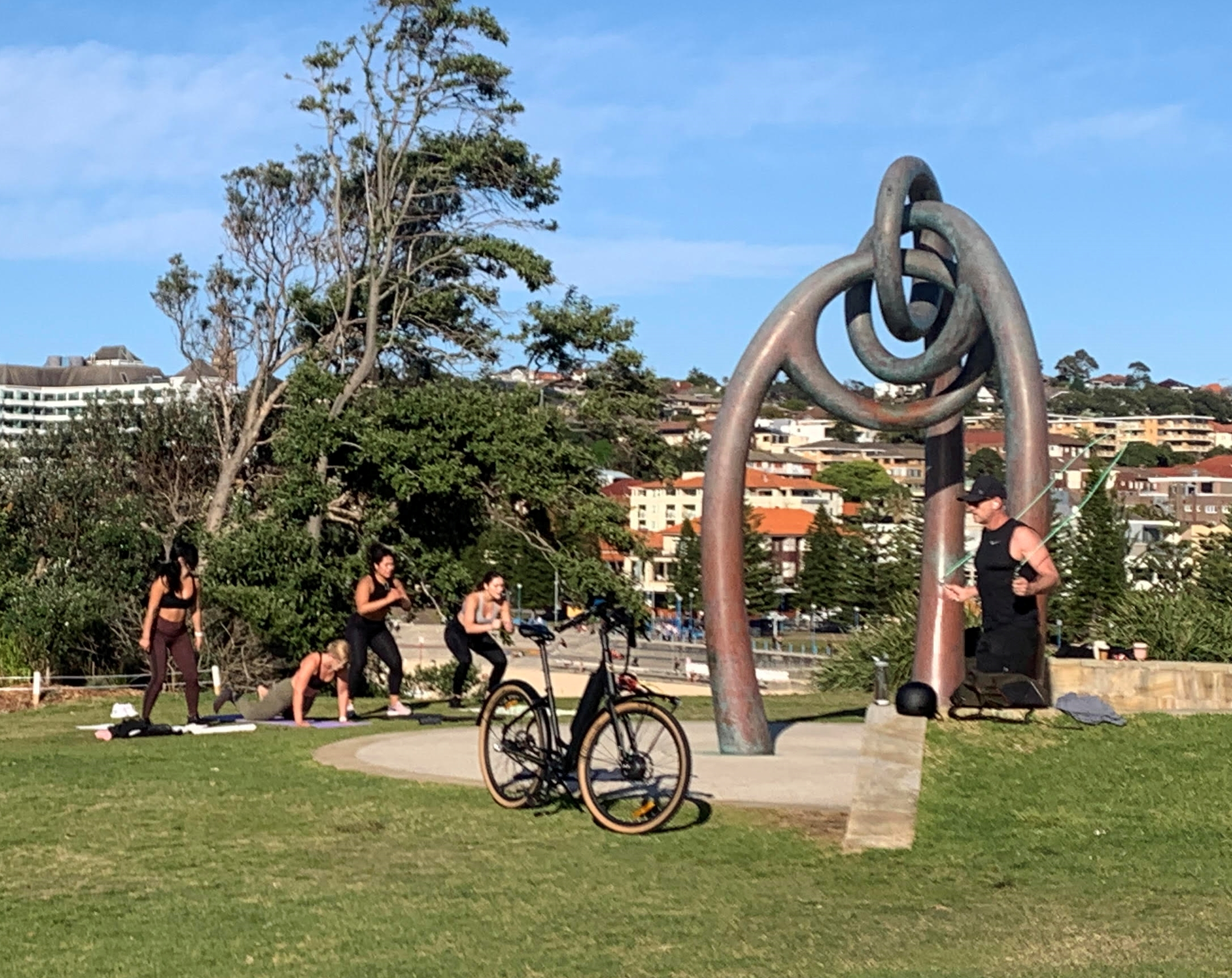
- System: Musculoskeletal, cardiovascular
- Specialist: Sport and Exercise Medicine (SEM) physician
- Glossary: Glossary of medicine

Sport and Exercise Medicine (SEM) physician
Occupation
- Names: Physician
- Occupation type: Specialty
- Activity sectors: Medicine

Description
- Competencies: Exercise prescription
- Education required: Doctor of Medicine (M.D.); Bachelor of Medicine, Bachelor of Surgery (M.B.B.S.); Bachelor of Medicine, Bachelor of Surgery (MBChB)
- Fields of employment: Hospitals, Clinics, university
- Related jobs: sports medicine physician

Exercise medicine is a branch of medicine that deals with physical fitness and the prevention and treatment of injuries and illness with exercise. In some countries, Sport and Exercise Medicine (SEM) is a recognized medical specialty (with similar training and standards to other medical specialties). Exercise medicine is therefore an emerging physician (non-surgical) specialty, but there is also a belief that exercise is treatment of such fundamental benefit that it should be incorporated into all medical specialties. Allied health practitioners also can specialize in exercise such as exercise physiologists, physiotherapists, athletic trainers and podiatrists.

Whereas the signature treatment of the specialty of surgery is operative procedures, and the signature treatment of most medical (physician) specialties is the prescription of pharmaceuticals, the signature treatment of Sport and Exercise Medicine is exercise prescription. SEM physician consultations are generally lengthy (over 30 minutes) and 74% involve prescription of exercise, with exercise prescription being the most common treatment.

== Evidence for the efficacy of exercise as a medical treatment ==
There is an enormous amount of evidence proving that exercise (when prescribed as a medical treatment) is effective at preventing and treating most of the major chronic diseases, including cancer, cardiovascular diseases, arthritis, osteoporosis, back pain, diabetes, depression and other mental illnesses and falls in the elderly.

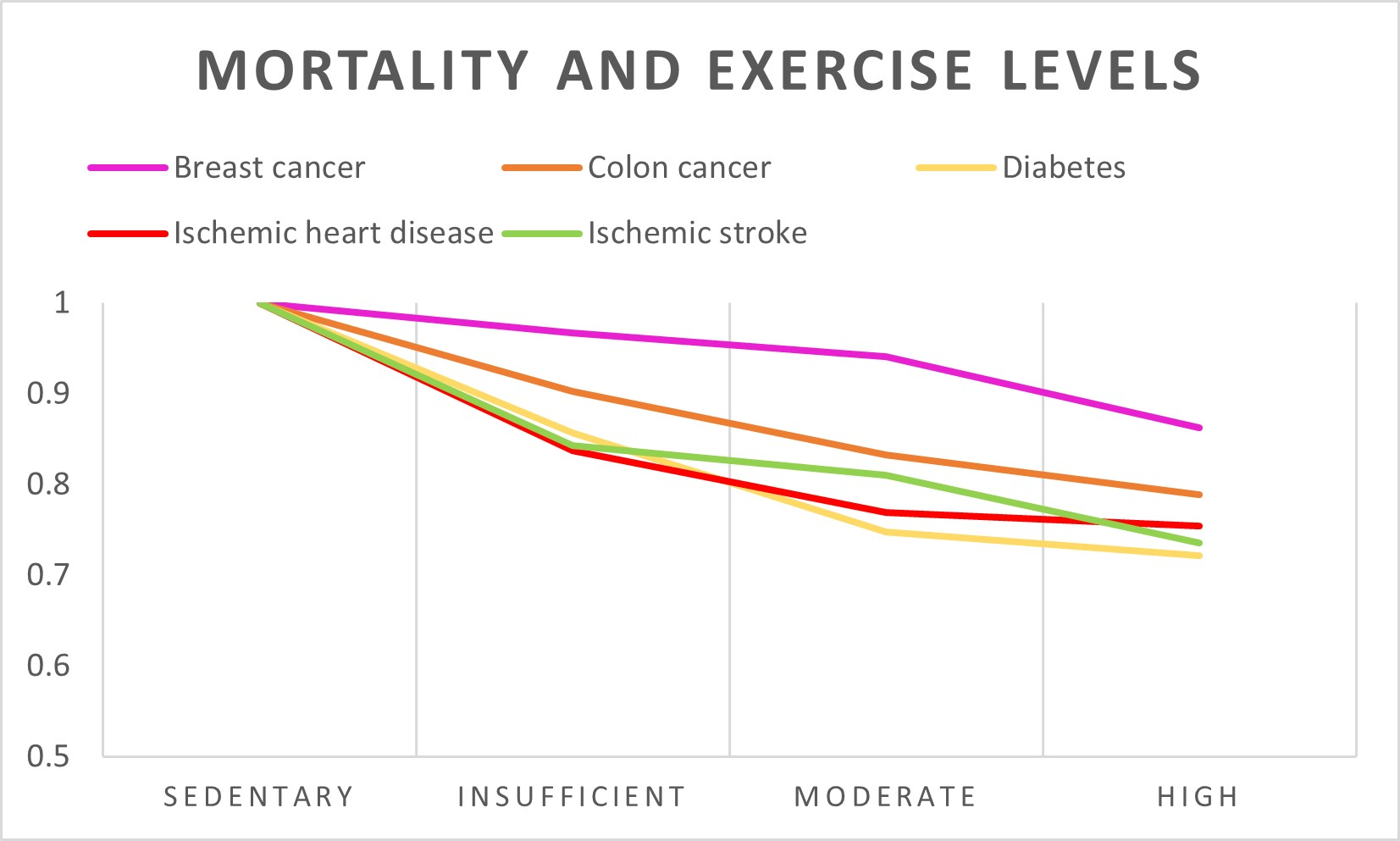
Exercise and mortality from certain diseases, adapted from

Exercise has been shown to reduce all-cause mortality in a large number of primary studies and meta-analyses.

=== Exercise and osteoarthritis ===
When compared to hip replacement and knee replacement respectively, exercise does not provide the same level of pain relief in the medium term as these major surgeries. However, less invasive surgery is not superior to exercise for mild-moderate knee osteoarthritis. Early knee replacement may not be cost-effective compared to an exercise program followed by crossover to knee replacement if necessary. Whereas exercise leads to reduced all-cause mortality, knee and hip replacement lead initially to reduced all-cause mortality then increased mortality after 11 years or more.

=== Exercise and cardiovascular disease ===
There are multiple ways in which exercise can reduce cardiovascular disease and mortality, including through lowering blood pressure and lowering LDL cholesterol levels. Although multiple mechanisms are possible, the relationship between exercise as measured by accelerometer data and cardiovascular mortality is strong (inverse, non-linear).

=== Exercise and cancer ===
Exercise prescription is now a recognized treatment for cancer, as studies have shown that exercise is associated with superior mortality outcomes and lower recurrence rates.

=== Exercise and mental illness ===
Exercise both prevents and treats mental illnesses, including depression in particular, with positive effects likely for anxiety, bipolar disorder and suicidality.

== Exercise dosing ==
Exercise prescription is not simply a matter of advising or demanding that a patient increases their exercise levels. It requires significant expertise and experience, with core competencies well described. Sudden increase of exercise levels is likely to lead to painful musculoskeletal symptoms or even injury (preventing further exercise).

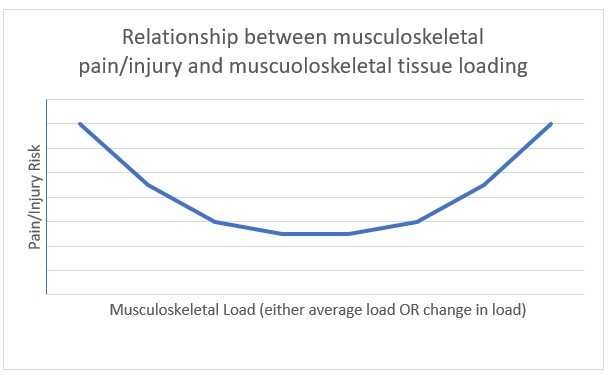
Both underloading and overloading can lead to injury

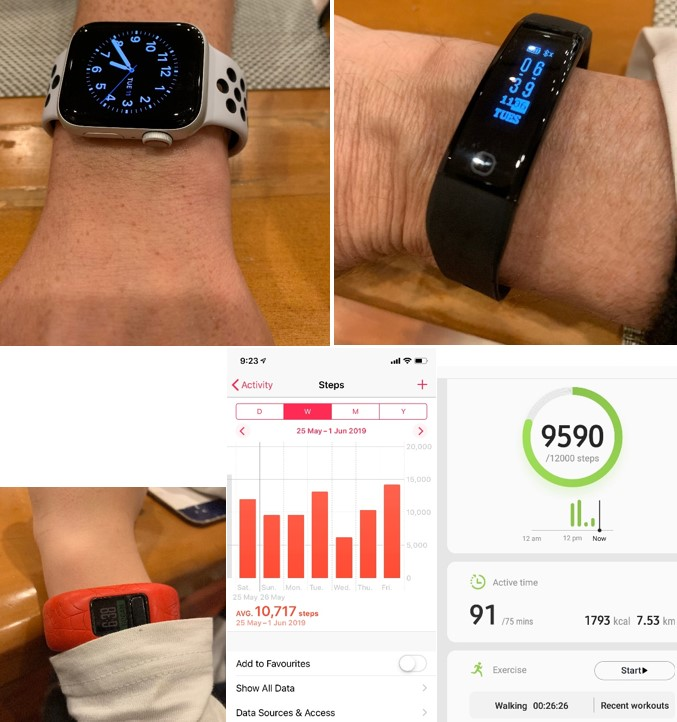
Use of wearable technology to measure exercise loads

The lifetime prevalence of hip and knee osteoarthritis is 13% for competitive runners, 10% for non-runners, but only 4% for moderate social runners, demonstrating a U-shaped curve between running load and arthritis risk (high and low dose = higher risk; moderate load = lower risk). With respect to back pain, increasing levels of exercise reduce risk of back pain, but having occupational manual loading increases the risk. The bottom of the U-shaped curve for injury risk and loading is sometimes referred to as the Goldilocks zone (not too little exercise but not too much). There also may be a Goldilocks zone for physical activity and all-cause mortality, but at a very high level and with an eccentric U-shape (that is, low exercise levels are far riskier for all-cause mortality than extremely high exercise levels).

== Differentiation from Sports medicine ==
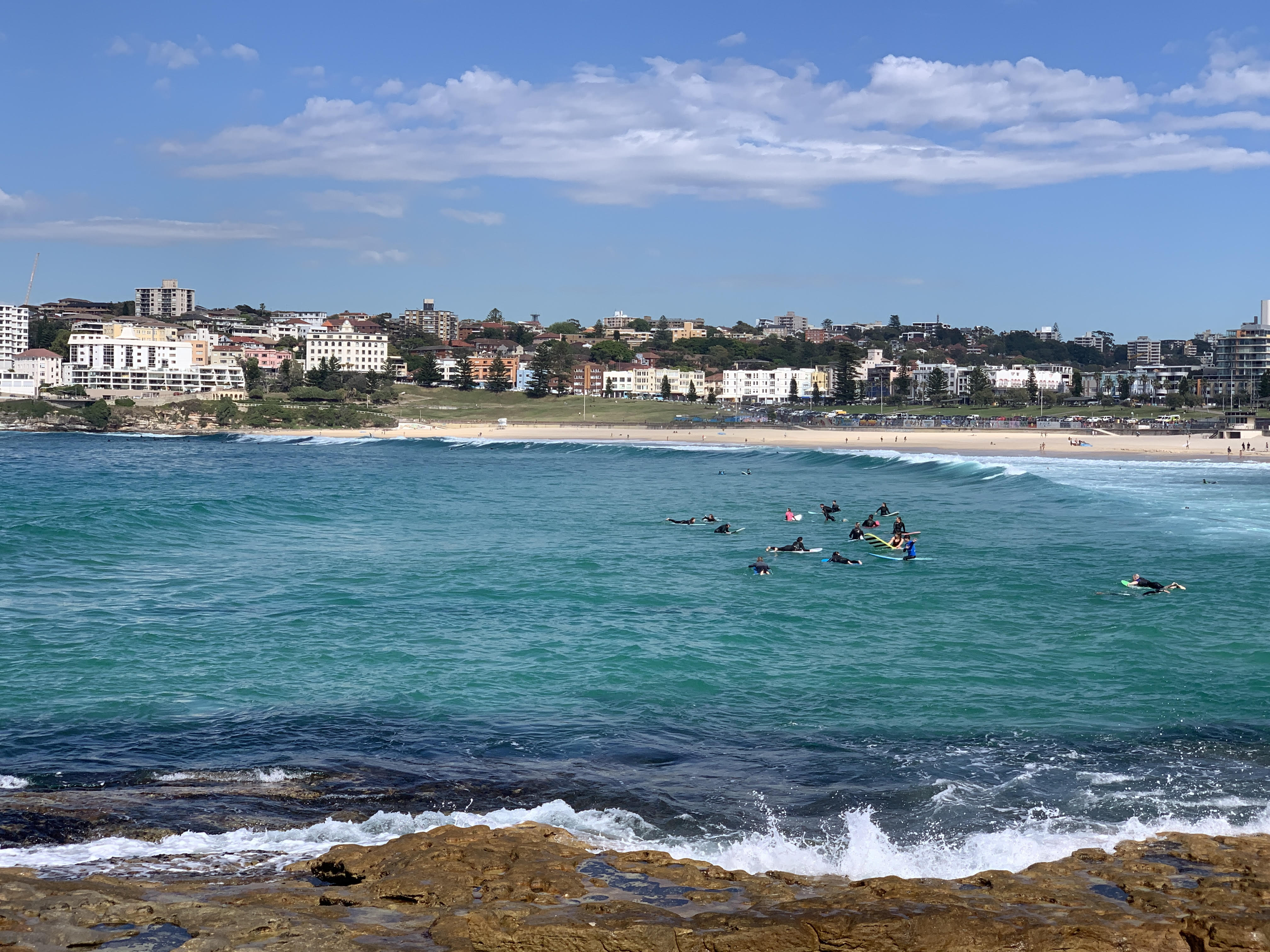
Recreational exercise such as swimming and surfing has multiple health benefits

The difference between sport and exercise (and hence the differentiation between Sports medicine and Exercise medicine) is subtle, but important. Basically, sport is exercise with an added element of competition (whether against an opponent or oneself, aiming to maximum performance improvements). There is good evidence that competitive and professional athletes have higher rates of certain conditions than the general population, such as osteoarthritis, but equally strong evidence that the life expectancy of elite athletes is longer than the general population.

== Establishment as a medical specialty ==
Sports medicine is a recognized medical specialty or subspecialty in over 50 countries. In some of these countries, the formal name of the specialty is 'Sport and Exercise Medicine', emphasizing the differentiation between sports medicine (performance-orientated) and exercise medicine (health-orientated). These countries include Australia and New Zealand, with the peak body being the Australasian College of Sport and Exercise Physicians and one of Australia's 15 recognized medical specialty Colleges, the United Kingdom (Faculty of Sport and Exercise Medicine UK), Canada (Canadian Academy of Sport and Exercise Medicine), Belgium, Brazil, France, India and Ireland.

== Exercise as an alternative treatment to low-value care ==
There is increasing evidence that many 'traditional' medical interventions are ineffective at best and potentially harmful at worst. Examples of low-value care include knee and shoulder arthroscopy, spinal fusion surgery and opiate prescription for chronic non-cancer pain. Exercise prescription, with evidence of efficacy for treatment of knee osteoarthritis and back pain, can be used as an alternative to traditional interventions with poor efficacy and greater side effects.

=== Exercise as a method to reduce carbon emissions from healthcare ===
Healthcare is responsible for 3-10% of carbon emissions in Western countries. Although most healthcare is considered 'essential', it is important that the necessity of carbon-intensive healthcare options, such as surgery, is critically assessed as there is an international agreement that net zero emissions must be reached to avoid breakdown of the Earth's climate. Exercise as a medical treatment has perhaps the lowest carbon footprint of any medical treatment. An increased focus on exercise prescription as an effective alternate to carbon-intensive medical treatments is an important part of healthcare reform, which needs to be 'transformational' to reach goals of net-zero emissions from healthcare.

== Differentiation from "Exercise Is Medicine" (EIM) ==
'Exercise is Medicine' is a trademarked non-profit venture of the American College of Sports Medicine. By comparison, 'Exercise Medicine' is a specific subspecialty of 'Sport and Exercise Medicine'. The concept of 'Exercise is Medicine' is that all medical specialists should be prescribing exercise regularly as an adjunct to a standard consultation. The aims of the 'Exercise is Medicine' movement and the specialty of Exercise Medicine are generally synergistic, with both aiming to improve physical activity in the population (for whom a large proportion is inactive). Exercise Medicine specialists also consult a smaller subsection of the population who are temporarily over-active and require a slight reduction in load in order to overcome injury or chronic pain. The concept of 'Exercise is Medicine' is as a 5-minute addition to almost every medical consultation, treating exercise as a 'vital sign', which has the potential of enormous reach. Exercise medicine specialists aim to also cater for some of those patients who don't respond to the first line measure of a brief written exercise prescription by providing longer specialized consultations with a focus solely on exercise. Exercise Is Medicine has been criticized for making exercise come across as exclusively a medical treatment when it should be seen more broadly as a public health strategy and protective risk factor that should be available to everyone.

=== Further reading on EIM ===
- Cairney, John; McGannon, Kerry R.; Atkinson, Michael (8 August 2018). "Exercise is medicine: critical considerations in the qualitative research landscape". Qualitative Research in Sport, Exercise and Health. 10 (4): 391–399. doi:10.1080/2159676X.2018.1476010. ISSN 2159-676X.

== Journals ==
- Medicine & Science in Sports & Exercise
- Exercise and Sport Sciences Reviews
- British Journal of Sports Medicine
- Journal of Exercise Science & Fitness
- BMJ Open Sport & Exercise Medicine
- Exercise Medicine
- PLOS One sports and exercise medicine
- Qualitative Research in Sport, Exercise and Health

== See also ==
- Exercise
- Exercise physiology
- Physical fitness
- Physical therapy
- Sports science
- Sports training
