= Faculty of Sport and Exercise Medicine UK =

- Abbreviation: FSEM
- Formation: 2006
- Legal status: Non-profit
- Purpose: Education, training, standards and advocacy of sports physicians
- Headquarters: Edinburgh
- Location: Scotland
- Region served: United Kingdom
- Members: Doctors
- President: Dr Natasha Jones
- Website: https://www.fsem.ac.uk/

The Faculty of Sport and Exercise Medicine UK (FSEM) is a not-for-profit professional organisation responsible for training, educating and representing over 500 doctors in the United Kingdom. These doctors practise in the speciality of sport and exercise medicine (SEM). The FSEM is housed in the Royal College of Surgeons Edinburgh, but is an intercollegiate faculty of the Royal Colleges of Physicians and RCSEd

== SEM practice in the United Kingdom ==
Sport and exercise medicine is a speciality area of medicine. In the UK, the status of SEM is of a stand-alone speciality with FSEM (UK) being the specialist body administering training and education. The three pillars of medicine upon which the specialty is based are Musculoskeletal Medicine, Exercise Medicine and Team Care. SEM physicians are able to prescribe drugs, perform minor surgical procedures, use diagnostic ultrasound and order other radiological imaging and blood tests, as well as providing exercise prescriptions for injury and disease.

== History ==
In 1998, the Intercollegiate Academic Board of Sport and Exercise Medicine (IABSEM) was formed under the auspices of the Academy of Medical Royal Colleges. In 2001, the Department of Health produced a document, "Developing specialties in medicine", to be used as a template for the formation of new specialities. In 2004, an application was submitted and it was approved by the Department of Health in February 2005.

In 2006, the Faculty of Sport and Exercise Medicine (UK) was established. The successful bid for the 2012 London Olympics was seen as a very helpful event in establishing the faculty and the specialty in the UK.

The FSEM (UK) also publishes position statements.

=== Past presidents ===
- Dr John Etherington
- Dr Paul D Jackson
- Dr Roderick D Jaques
- Prof Mark E Batt
- Prof Charles S B Galasko

== See also ==
- FIMS
- British Association of Sport and Exercise Medicine
- Exercise is Medicine
- Australasian College of Sport and Exercise Physicians
- Canadian Academy of Sport and Exercise Medicine
