= Australasian College of Sport and Exercise Physicians =

Organization of Doctors in Australia and New Zealand

- Abbreviation: ACSEP
- Formation: 1985
- Legal status: Non-profit
- Purpose: Education, training, standards and advocacy of sports physicians
- Headquarters: Melbourne, Victoria
- Location: Australia
- Region served: Australia and New Zealand
- Members: Doctors
- President: Dr Dan Exeter
- Staff: 8
- Website: www.acsep.org.au

The Australasian College of Sport and Exercise Physicians (ACSEP) is a not-for-profit professional organisation responsible for training, educating, and representing over 350 doctors in Australia and New Zealand. These doctors practise medicine in the specialty of sport and exercise medicine (SEM). The ACSEP is the smallest of the 15 recognised specialist medical Colleges in Australia with approximately 260 Fellows and Registrars in 2020. Australia and New Zealand, along with the UK, have been cited as pioneer countries in the establishment of SEM as a stand-alone specialty.

== Sport and exercise medicine practice in Australia and New Zealand ==
Sport and exercise medicine is a specialty area of medicine, although the structure of SEM training varies substantially from country to country. In Australia and New Zealand the status of SEM is of a stand-alone specialty with ACSEP being the specialist College administering training and education. In Australia and New Zealand, patients are encouraged or required to visit a General Practitioner before being referred to a specialist. Doctors wishing to specialize in sport and exercise medicine must complete a medical degree, a minimum of three years of pre-specialty general medical training, a minimum of 4 years of specialty (advanced) training with the ACSEP, pass examinations, publish a research paper in the field of SEM and undertake annual continuous medical education to stay active. The ACSEP is one of the few specialist medical colleges in Australia and NZ that conducts training primarily in private practice, others being the Royal Australian College of General Practitioners and Australian College of Rural and Remote Medicine.

Although sports physicians can prescribe drugs, perform minor surgical procedures, use Diagnostic ultrasound and order other radiological imaging and blood tests, the signature treatment of SEM practice is exercise prescription. Careers within SEM in Australia and NZ include:

- Clinical sports medicine practice, treating musculoskeletal injuries in athletes, but also treating illness and working in areas such as sports cardiology, managing concussion and exercise-induced asthma
- Clinical exercise medicine practice assisting with non-athletic patients who are trying to exercise move for general health. Exercise is known to treat and/or prevent cancer, cardiovascular disease, mental health disorders, arthritis and back pain, diabetes and osteoporosis, which are many of Australia's health priorities.
- Working in professional and elite sport as a team doctor
- Working in professional and elite sport as an administrator. The majority of major sports in Australia have Chief Medical Officers who oversee medical and health policy within the sport
- Working in research/academic publication

Some of the major conditions typically treated by SEM include Osteoarthritis, Tendinopathy, Back pain, Muscle strain, Concussions in sport, Sprained ankle, Anterior cruciate ligament injury, Dislocated shoulder.

Sports and exercise medicine physicians working in specialist SEM practice and the ACSEP are differentiated from the more broad bodies Sports Medicine Australia and Sports Medicine New Zealand which represents not only doctors but also Allied Health practitioners working in the Sports medicine field, including occupations such as Physiotherapist, Exercise Physiologist, Podiatrist and other branches of Sports science. The worldwide parent body for these more broad sports medicine associations is FIMS.

=== Funding ===
Sport and exercise medicine in New Zealand is essentially funded by the Accident Compensation Corporation, which is a no-fault government insurer covering all injuries which occur in NZ, including sports injuries. Professional sports also directly employ some SEM physicians.

In Australia, Medicare has traditionally provided very limited funding for patients of SEM physicians. Medicare rebates for SEM physicians were lowered in 2010, and were not increased until 2025, so that much of the expense in consulting a SEM physician was borne by the patient. Initial referred consultations with a SEM specialist under Medicare in Australia had a bulk-billing rate of only 9% in 2018–19, which is the lowest for any type of specialist under Medicare in Australia. A typical cost for consultation was A$225 in 2018–19, of which only $73.85 was refunded by Medicare, leaving patients $151 out of pocket. A 2016-2018 review of Medicare recommended that SEM consultation rebates for SEM physicians increase to achieve parity with other specialist physicians (p 29–37), although no formal response to this review was ever made by the Department of Health. Instead, the ACSEP was referred to multiple other committees for further consideration. In 2024, the Medicare Benefits Schedule Review Advisory Committee (MRAC) also recommended that ACSEP Fellows practised as non-procedural physicians using referral-based long consultations and therefore should be made eligible for Consultant Physician rebates under Medicare. The other traditional specialties of medicine in Australia were accused of creating a "hostile environment" stopping sports medicine from being recognized adequately under Medicare over the first 25 years of the 21st Century. Finally, on July 1, 2025, SEM physicians in Australia were granted parity with other specialist physicians (consultant physicians) in Australia and their patients finally allowed to claim long consultation item numbers.

=== Annual conference ===
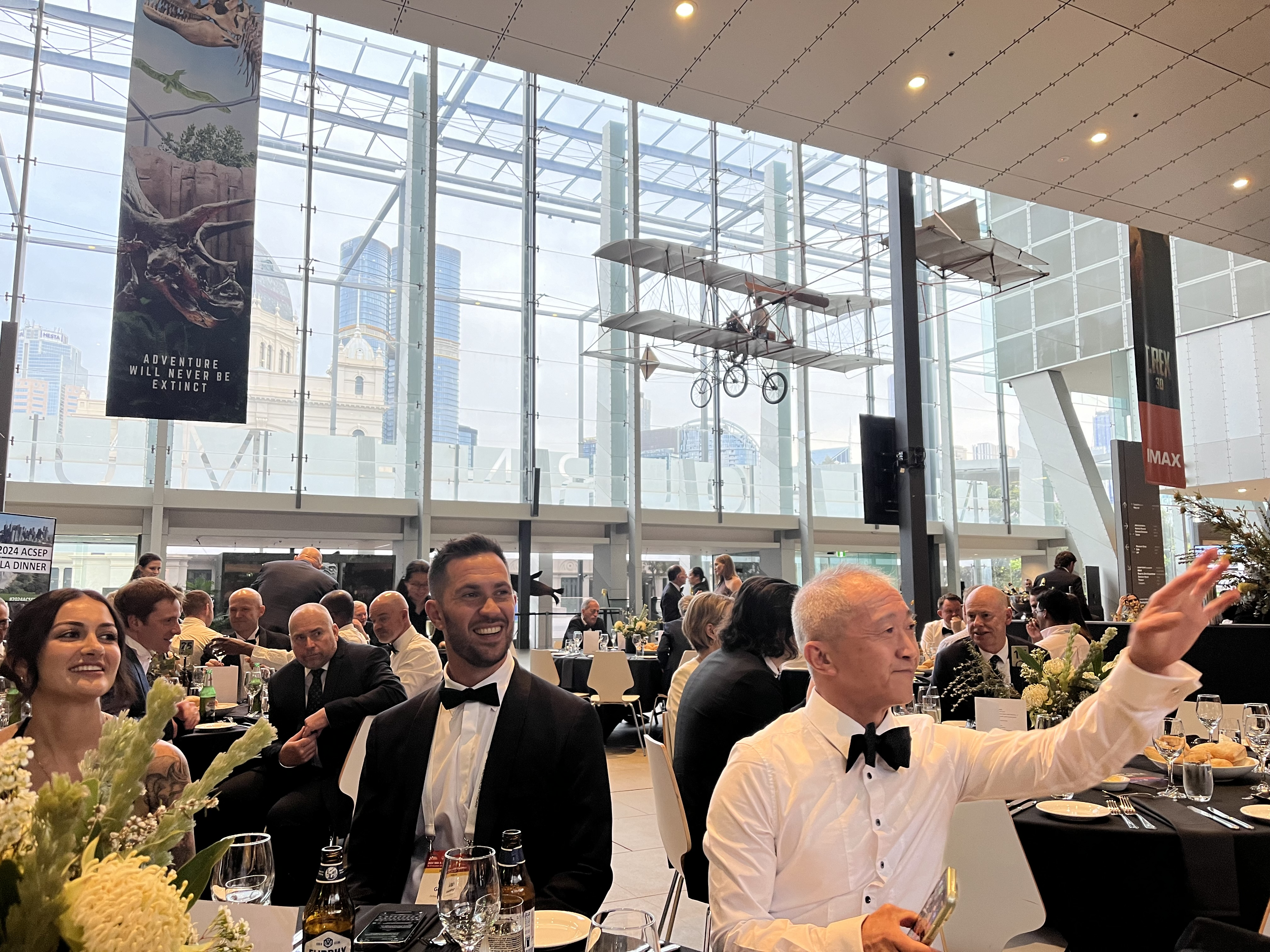
Annual conference dinner ACSEP 2024, Melbourne

Generally in spring of each year (October-November), the ACSEP holds an annual scientific conference. In some years this is in conjunction with the conferences of Sports Medicine Australia or Sports Medicine New Zealand. The conference venue rotates with NZ hosting approximately every 4th year. The date is chosen partly due to the seasonal nature of the professional football codes in Australasia in autumn and winter, which would make a suitable date in these seasons problematic. A highlight is the annual dinner with awarding of Fellowships to newly graduated Fellows. The college is small enough that individual career-to-date citations for new Fellows can be made at the dinner.

== History ==
The ACSEP was originally formed as the Australian College of Sports Physicians (ACSP) in 1985 by a group of doctors with vocational interest in sports medicine. Some of the original sports physicians in Australia were GPs who took an interest in sport and eventually chose to practise full-time in this area. In the late 1980s, a decision was made to pursue a stand-alone medical specialty with a formal structure of entry and Fellowship exams and multi-year training program. The ACSP granted honorary Fellowship (FACSP) to ten Fellows of other recognized specialty colleges in Australia who acted as examiners. All applicants for the inaugural FACSP qualification had to show the equivalent of current practice in sports medicine and pass an exam, which first took place in 1991. This examination continued to become the Part 2 ACSP examination.

In 1992, the first registrars (trainees) were admitted onto the ACSP training program, which was conducted in private practice initially in Melbourne and Sydney. The ACSP first part examination was developed.

In 1993, the first training position at a government institution was created at the Australian Institute of Sport (AIS) in Canberra.

In 1993 New Zealand Fellows were admitted for the first time.

In 1998, sports medicine was recognized as a vocational specialty in New Zealand.

In 2000, ACSEP Fellows were instrumental in providing athlete care services for all sports in the Sydney Olympic Games. The training program was well established with 17 training posts in the year 2000.

In 2000, sports physicians were first recognized by Medicare in Australia and awarded consultation item numbers equivalent to vocationally-registered General Practitioners.

In 2006, the Faculty of Sport and Exercise Medicine UK was established with many of the structures and training programs established using the existing structures of the ACSP.

In 2008, the ACSP was successfully assessed by the Australian Medical Council as having fulfilled all the criteria for establishment as a specialist medical College in Australia. This has been successfully reviewed in 2013 and 2019.

In 2010, Medicare recognized sports physicians as specialists in Australia.

In 2014, the National Office, which was initially established in Sydney, moved to Collins St in the Melbourne CBD.

In 2016, the ACSP changed its name to include Exercise in the title alongside sport with the college abbreviation becoming ACSEP. Exercise medicine is thought to be an emerging branch of SEM aimed at keeping the population healthy by assisting with Exercise Prescription.

By 2020, the ACSEP had over 50 training positions (registrars) with over 200 specialist doctors in total in Australia and New Zealand, and other affiliated members.

In 2020, New Zealand Sport & Exercise Physicians published a consensus statement in response to the Coronavirus pandemic. A similar statement was published in Australia by the Australian Institute of Sport.

On July 1, 2025, Australian SEM Physicians were granted parity with other Consultant Physicians in Australia under Medicare and their patients allowed to claim for referred long consultation items.

== Notable Sport and exercise physicians in Australasia ==
Notable sport and exercose physicians in Australia and New Zealand (who are ACSEP Fellows) include Peter Larkins, Nathan Gibbs, Rachel Harris, Martin Raftery, Peter Fricker, Karim M. Khan, Lesley Rumball and Dave Gerrard and Peter Brukner OAM. Merv Cross was appointed as one of the inaugural honorary Fellows.

Dr Geoff Thompson AM was named the Northern Territory Australian of the Year in 2020. In June 2023, four Sport and Exercise physicians were awarded in the King's Birthday Honours of Australia for services to sports medicine, Peter Harcourt, AM, Diana Robinson, AM, David Hughes, AM and David Humphries OAM. The majority of the doctors working for AFL clubs are sport and exercise physicians.

=== Office bearers ===
The key office bearers at the ACSEP are:

Position	Office Holder
President	Dan Exeter
President Elect	Dr Rachel Harris
Board Chair	Phil Calvert
Chief Executive Officer	Sudi Sekhar

Sport and exercise medicine physicians are generally appointed as the Chief Medical Officers (CMOs) for most of the major sporting competitions in Australian and New Zealand, along with medical coverage for major sporting events.

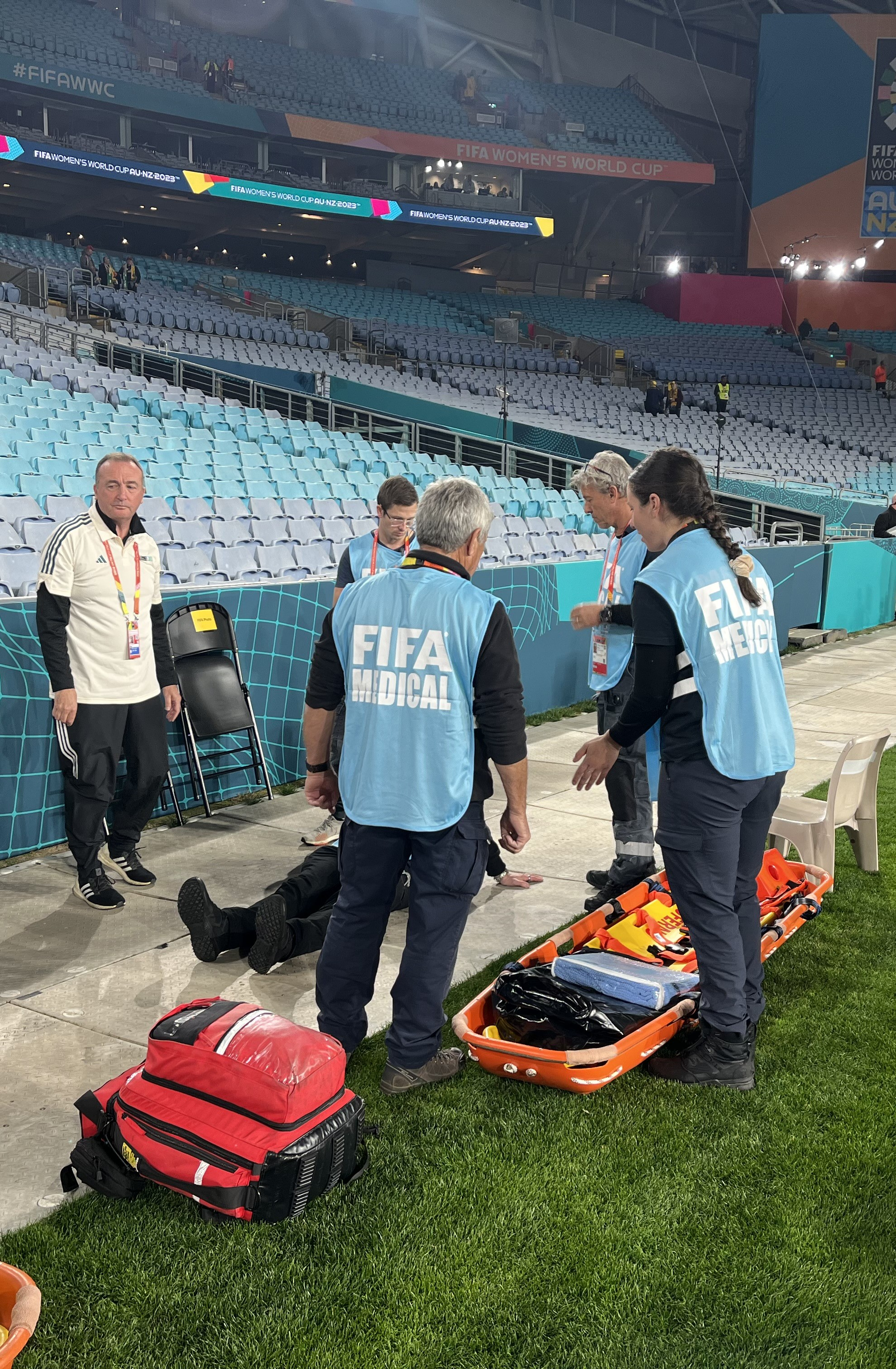
A pre-match medical briefing at a sporting competition

Current sport CMOs are:

Organisation	Chief Medical Officer
Australian Football League	Dr Michael Makdissi
Australian Institute of Sport	Dr David Hughes, AM
Cricket Australia	Dr John Orchard, AM
Football Federation Australia	Dr Mark Jones
NSW Institute of Sport	Dr Corey Cunningham
Netball Australia	Dr Susan White, AM
New Zealand Rugby	Dr Ian Murphy
National Rugby League	Dr Sharron Flahive
Queensland Academy of Sport	Dr Sharon Stay
Rugby Australia	Dr Warren McDonald
SASI	Dr Geoff Verrall
Tennis Australia	Dr Carolyn Broderick
Victorian Institute of Sport	Dr Susan White, AM
Western Australian Institute of Sport (WAIS)	Dr Carmel Goodman

Sport and Exercise Medicine Physicians constituted the majority of panel members for the Australian government COVID-19 Sports and Health Advisory Committee (C19SHAC), reporting to the Australian Health Protection Principal Committee as part of response to the Coronavirus pandemic in Australia.

== Controversies in Australasian sports medicine ==
Sports medicine is one of the most visible medical specialties in Australia and New Zealand because of the prominence of professional sport in these countries. Issues that have had very high public profile that have involved sports medicine include Concussions in Australian sport, the Impact of the COVID-19 pandemic on sports, the Essendon Football Club supplements saga, Cronulla-Sutherland Sharks supplements saga, Drugs in sport in Australia, and serious injuries to high-profile players, such as Phillip Hughes (who died playing cricket in Australia). A criticism/controversy of doctors who work in professional sport is that generally they are paid by their team which creates a potential conflict of interest between the best interests of the team and the best interests of the long-term health of the player (patient). The management of on-field concussion is a particular area of controversy, with club doctors given both responsibility for player safety and accountability. Individual doctors working in professional and elite sport have been publicly criticised or accused of helping clubs cover up drug use or poor behaviour of players or engaging in such behaviour themselves. It is not known whether the professional sport environment is associated with a higher rate of poor medical practice or whether the high public profile of sport leads to accusations being publicly made far more often in Sports Medicine than in other fields.

Within clinical practice of Sport and Exercise Medicine in Australia, there is a criticism that some of these specialists are overly willing to use or recommend speculative new treatments such as Stem Cell injections. The ACSEP has a position statement exercising caution over the use of Stem Cells but does not forbid individual members from doing so.

There is also criticism of SEM physicians in Australia that they undertake too much surgical assisting, as this is generously funded under Medicare in Australia. A recent Medicare review report however still found that the majority of Medicare billing for sport and exercise Medicine physicians was through consultations, not procedures.

== Partners ==
- National Rugby League to create the Dr Ken Crichton Fellowship
- Accident Compensation Corporation to work to reduce injuries in New Zealand.
- University of Washington's Center for Sports Cardiology to produce a module for training physicians in the interpretation of Electrocardiography in Athletes.
- Australia's National Osteoarthritis Strategy.
- Australian Institute of Sport, the Australian Medical Association and Sports Medicine Australia in the Concussion in Sport Australia Position statement.

== Journals ==
The ACSEP subscribes to many sport and exercise medicine journals but has a particular relationship as a member society with the Clinical Journal of Sport Medicine and the British Journal of Sports Medicine.

== See also ==
- Australian Institute of Sport
- Accident Compensation Corporation
- Sports Medicine Australia
- Canadian Academy of Sport and Exercise Medicine
- FIMS
- British Association of Sport and Exercise Medicine
- Exercise is Medicine
- New Zealand College of Musculoskeletal Medicine
