= Exercise prescription software =

Exercise prescription software is a branch of computer software designed to aid in the construction of exercise programmes or regimes for patients who require some kind of ongoing rehabilitation.

Exercise prescription is common in physiotherapy practices where traditionally patients would be given a printed handout with diagrams and instructions describing any rehabilitation exercises. As high speed internet becomes prevalent in the home, and paperless offices are more desirable, prescribed exercises may be e-mailed to patients. diagrams may be replaced by instructional videos, and new technologies (apps for mobile devices, wearable devices, and online support forums) have expanded the ways in which exercise may be prescribed and monitored.

In addition to traditional software tools, recent advancements have introduced AI-based systems to the realm of exercise prescription software. These systems use real-world exercise data, heart rate metrics, and other health indicators to tailor exercise prescriptions, thereby enhancing the precision and effectiveness of rehabilitation programs. Such developments represent a significant shift towards more personalized and data-driven approaches in exercise prescription and monitoring.

== See also ==
- Exercise is Medicine
- Exercise prescription
