= Josephine Rathbone =

Josephine Rathbone may refer to:

- Josephine Adams Rathbone, American librarian
- Josephine Langworthy Rathbone, American physiologist
