= Exercise and Sport Sciences Reviews =

- Discipline: Sports medicine, exercise science
- Language: English
- Edited by: Sandra K. Hunter

Publication details
- History: 1973-present
- Publisher: Lippincott Williams & Wilkins
- Frequency: Quarterly
- Impact factor: 6.642 (2021)

Standard abbreviations
- ISO 4: Exerc. Sport Sci. Rev.

Indexing
- CODEN: ESSRB8
- ISSN: 0091-6331 (print); 1538-3008 (web)
- LCCN: 72012187
- OCLC no.: 1783628

Links
- Journal homepage; Online access; Online archive

Exercise and Sport Sciences Reviews is a quarterly peer-reviewed review journal covering sports medicine and exercise science. It was established in 1973 as a hardcover book series, and became a quarterly peer-reviewed journal in January 2000. It is published by Lippincott Williams & Wilkins, and is an official journal of the American College of Sports Medicine. The editor-in-chief is Sandra K. Hunter, Ph.D., FACSM (Marquette University). According to the Journal Citation Reports, the journal has a 2021 impact factor of 6.642.
