= The Journal of Strength and Conditioning Research =

- Discipline: Sports science Exercise science
- Language: English
- Edited by: Nicholas A. Ratamess Jr.

Publication details
- Former name: Journal of Applied Sport Science Research
- History: 1987–present
- Publisher: Lippincott Williams & Wilkins
- Frequency: Monthly
- Impact factor: 2.060 (2016)

Standard abbreviations
- ISO 4: J. Strength Cond. Res.

Indexing
- ISSN: 1064-8011 (print); 1533-4287 (web)
- LCCN: 94664011

Links
- Journal homepage; Online access; Online archive

The Journal of Strength and Conditioning Research is a monthly peer-reviewed medical journal which publishes research on aerobic conditioning, including physical strength. It was established in 1987 as the Journal of Applied Sport Science Research, obtaining its current name in 1993. It is published by Lippincott Williams & Wilkins on behalf of the National Strength and Conditioning Association, of which it is the official journal. The editor-in-chief is Nicholas A. Ratamess Jr. (The College of New Jersey). According to the Journal Citation Reports, the journal has a 2016 impact factor of 2.060, ranking it 28th out of 81 journals in the category "Sport Sciences".
