= Lifestyle medicine =

Aspects of medicine focused on food, exercise, and sleep

Lifestyle Medicine
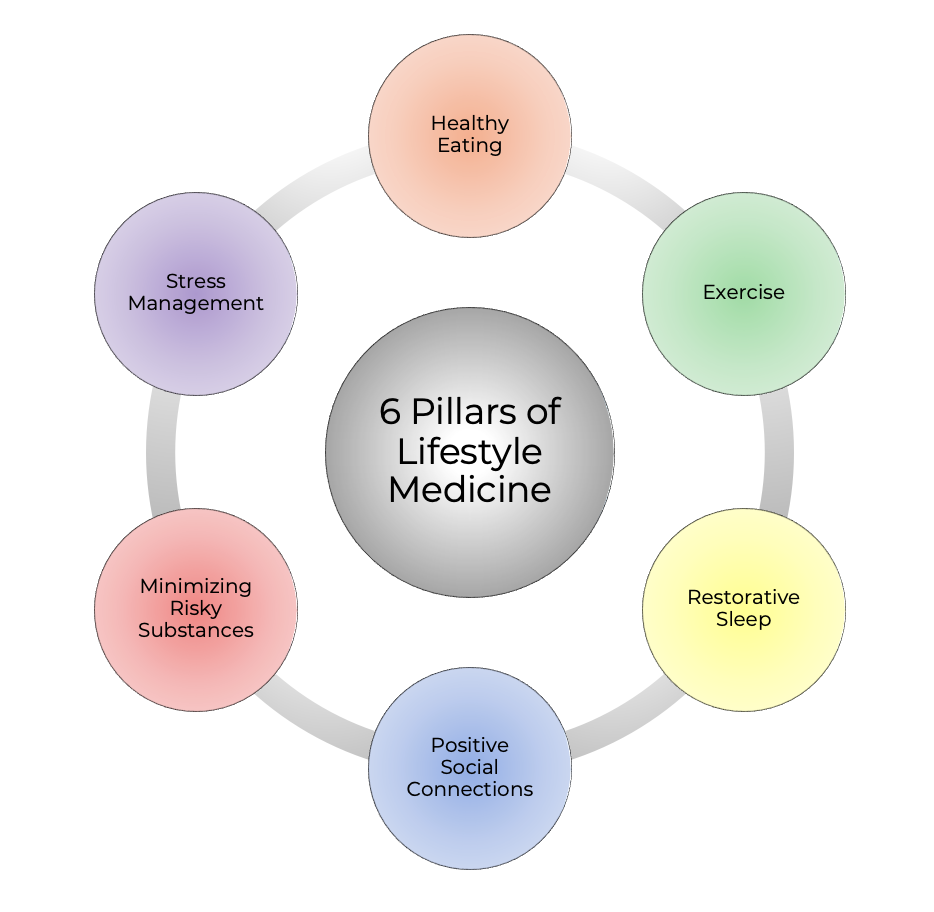
- The focus of Lifestyle Medicine is on these 6 pillars.
- Focus: nutrition, sleep, physical activity, stress management, tobacco/alcohol cessation, and healthy relationships
- Significant diseases: Non-communicable diseases (NCD); Lifestyle-related diseases (LRD); Chronic illnesses; Hypertension; Cardiovascular diseases; Diabetes; Obesity; Metabolic syndrome; Substance use
- Specialist: Lifestyle medicine physician

Lifestyle medicine (LM) is a branch of medicine focused on preventive healthcare and self-care dealing with prevention, research, education, and treatment of disorders caused by lifestyle factors and preventable causes of death such as nutrition, physical inactivity, chronic stress, and self-destructive behaviors including the consumption of tobacco products and drug or alcohol abuse. The goal of LM is to improve individuals' health and wellbeing by applying the 6 pillars of lifestyle medicine (nutrition, regular physical activity, restorative sleep, stress management, avoidance of risky substances, and positive social connection) to prevent chronic conditions such as cardiovascular diseases, diabetes, metabolic syndrome and obesity.

Lifestyle medicine focuses on educating and motivating patients to improve the quality of their lives by changing personal habits and behaviors, including adopting healthier diets that minimize ultra-processed foods, such as a Mediterranean diet or whole food, plant-predominant dietary patterns. Lifestyle factors such as poor dietary patterns, physical inactivity, tobacco use, alcohol addiction and dependence, drug addiction and dependence, as well as psychosocial factors such as chronic stress and a lack of social support and community, contribute to chronic disease. In the clinic, major barriers to lifestyle counseling are that physicians feel ill-prepared and are skeptical about their patients' receptivity. Encouraging healthy decisions may help prevent illnesses or improve their long-term management.

== Practice ==
Lifestyle interventions require behavior changes that may be challenging for health professionals, communities, and patients. The task of the LM practitioner is to motivate and support healthy behavior changes through evidence-based approaches to prevent and manage chronic conditions. LM emphasizes personalized care and uses patient-centered approaches such as goal-setting, shared decision-making, and self-management. Coaching patients on how to cook healthy food at home, for example, can be part of a lifestyle-oriented medical practice. Focusing on the health needs of an individual also includes considering the person's social and economic needs.

LM uses behavioral science to equip and encourage patients to make lifestyle changes. There are many theories of behavior change; the transtheoretical model is considered particularly suited to lifestyle medicine. It posits that individuals progress through six stages of change: precontemplation, contemplation, preparation, action, maintenance, and termination. Stage-matched interventions are most likely to result in successful behavior changes. LM practitioners are encouraged to adopt counseling methods such as motivational interviewing (MI) to identify patient readiness to change and provide stage- appropriate lifestyle interventions. These skills have been shown to be more effective than giving advice like "Exercise more and eat healthy".

LM is similar to preventive medicine in that it also bridges the gap between conventional medicine and public health. LM interventions such as behavioral change counseling are used as an adjunct to pharmacotherapy. Like other branches of medicine, LM promotes healthy lifestyle choices to prevent and treat diseases. Overall wellness and self-management are crucial components of lifestyle medicine and reinforce the idea of living healthier through behavioral change. Health promotion is the foundation of LM and encourages individuals to participate in their own care and well-being.

== Levels ==
LM may be practiced on three levels. The first level involves recognition by all healthcare professionals that lifestyle choices determine health status and are important modifiers of the response to pharmaceutical and/or surgical treatments. All practitioners are encouraged to include lifestyle advice along with standard treatment protocols. The second level is specialty care (e.g., Exercise medicine and Physiatry) in which LM interventions are the focus of treatment and pharmaceutical and/or surgical treatments are an adjunct to be used as necessary. The third level is population/community health programs and policies. Proponents recommend that lifestyle intervention advice be included in public health/preventive medicine guidance and policies for the prevention and treatment of chronic diseases.

== Interprofessional education and collaboration ==
Lifestyle medicine (LM) can be incorporated into the training of healthcare professionals, including education on evidence-based lifestyle interventions such as plant-based nutrition, stress management, physical activity, sleep, relationship skills, and substance-use reduction. LM can also be incorporated into interprofessional education, in which students from two or more healthcare professions learn together with the aim of developing collaborative approaches to patient-centered care.

Healthcare professionals may benefit from training in discussing behavioral lifestyle changes with patients and assessing factors related to the social determinants of health. Such discussions may support patients in making decisions related to their lifestyle and healthcare goals.

There are many educational pathways to becoming an expert in LM. Physicians can become certified or accredited by the International Board of Lifestyle Medicine (IBLM), American Board of Lifestyle Medicine (ABLM), European Lifestyle Medicine Organization (ELMO), and British Society of Lifestyle Medicine (BSLM).Additionally, formal academic programs are available, including the Master of Science (MSc) in Lifestyle Medicine at the University of Thessaly, developed in collaboration with ELMO. The Lifestyle Medicine Global Alliance (LMGA) is an organization that connects LM professionals from nations around the world to collaborate, share resources, and create solutions for preventing and reversing non-communicable and chronic diseases.

== See also ==
- Active living
- American College of Lifestyle Medicine
