= ACSM American Fitness Index =

The ACSM American Fitness Index (Fitness Index) is an initiative of the American College of Sports Medicine that aims to quantitatively measure the overall health and fitness level of the 100 largest cities by population in America. Today, the 100 most populous cities are ranked annually. As of 2024, Arlington, VA was ranked as the fittest city in America; Oklahoma City, OK ranked as the least fit city, both for the seventh year in a row.

The Fitness Index's goal is to provide local policy-makers with the information necessary to improve the health, fitness, and quality of life of community residents by promoting healthier lifestyles and physical activity.

== Methodology ==
Ranks and scores are assigned by weighing various indicators and rewarding or penalizing the city as appropriate. These indicators are classified into two broad categories: Personal Health, which measures the health habits and outcomes for city residents, including their physical activity, diet, and chronic health problems, and Community and Environment, which includes scores to measure the walkability, bikeability, availability and convenience of local parks, community recreation facilities like pools, tennis courts, and baseball diamonds, and presence of local policies like Complete Streets and physical education requirements in schools.
