= New Zealand College of Musculoskeletal Medicine =

- Abbreviation: NZCMM
- Formation: 1980
- Legal status: Nonprofit
- Headquarters: Auckland, New Zealand
- Members: Doctors
- President: Dr S Thomson
- Website: nzcmm.org.nz
- Formerly called: New Zealand Association of Musculoskeletal Medicine

The New Zealand College of Musculoskeletal Medicine (NZCMM) is a professional association that is responsible for training and representing Musculoskeletal Medicine Specialists and General Practitioners with a Special Interest in Musculoskeletal Medicine in New Zealand.

Musculoskeletal Medicine Specialists are also known as Musculoskeletal Physicians. They are trained in the basic sciences, assessment, and management of disorders of the musculoskeletal system. There is a strong focus in critical reasoning and biostatistics. Management domains may include education and reassurance, rehabilitation planning, manual therapy, medication, and image-guided injections using ultrasound or fluoroscopy.

The NZCMM has been recognized by the Medical Council of New Zealand (MCNZ) as the Vocational Education Advisory Body to manage the vocational branch of Musculoskeletal Medicine since 2000. The name was changed from the New Zealand Association of Musculoskeletal Medicine (NZAMM) on 4th October 2021 on advice from the Medical Council to provide a more consistent naming scheme with other institutions tasked with vocational training.

The CAMM (Certificate of Attainment in Musculoskeletal Medicine) is the qualification that is recognised by the MCNZ to practice in the vocational scope of Musculoskeletal Medicine and is awarded on successful completion of the NZCMM training program. Graduates are permitted to use the designation Fellow of the New Zealand College of Musculoskeletal Medicine (FNZCMM) or Fellow of the Australasian Faculty of Musculoskeletal Medicine (FAFMM).

== See also ==
- Accident Compensation Corporation
- Australasian College of Sport and Exercise Physicians
