= Geoffrey Thompson (doctor) =

- Born: 1945 (age 80–81); South Australia
- Occupations: Sport and exercise medicine physician
- Awards: Northern Territory Australian of the Year 2020

Geoffrey Thompson FACSEP (born 1945) is an Australian sports physician who was a finalist in the 2020 Australian of the Year award, being named Northern Territory Australian of the Year.

== Royal Australian Air Force and Flying Doctor service ==
He was called up to the Australian Defence Force in 1967, transferring soon to the Royal Australian Air Force (RAAF) because he had a pilot’s licence. He moved with his wife to Darwin in 1971. In 1974, when Cyclone Tracy hit Darwin, he assisted with the RAAF effort to evacuate the city as both pilot and doctor.

== Career as a sports physician ==
He was motivated to study to become a Sport and Exercise Medicine physician after studying under Kenneth H. Cooper at Dallas.

He was the inaugural President of the Sports Medicine Australia (Northern Territory branch) and was one of the Foundation Fellows of the Australasian College of Sport and Exercise Physicians.

He is Chief Medical Officer for the Australian Paralympic Committee.

He is a member of the Australian Sports Drug Medical Advisory Committee Review Panel.

He has a particular interest in advancing healthcare in indigenous athletes in the Northern Territory.

== Northern Territory Australian of the Year winner 2020 ==
Geoff Thompson was awarded the NT Australian of the Year in 2020 and was a finalist in the Australian of the Year awards.

=== Video profiles ===
- Geoffrey Thompson NT AOTY msn.com
- Dr Geoffrey Thompson - YouTube
