= Medicine & Science in Sports & Exercise =

- Discipline: Sports science
- Language: English
- Edited by: Andrew Jones, Ph.D., FACSM

Publication details
- Former name(s): Medicine and Science in Sports
- History: 1969-present
- Publisher: Lippincott Williams & Wilkins on behalf of the American College of Sports Medicine (United States)
- Frequency: Monthly
- Impact factor: 6.289 (2021)

Standard abbreviations
- ISO 4: Med. Sci. Sports Exerc.

Indexing
- CODEN: MSPEDA
- ISSN: 0195-9131 (print); 1530-0315 (web)
- LCCN: 80644663
- OCLC no.: 846855575

Links
- Journal homepage; Online access; Online archive

Medicine & Science in Sports & Exercise is a monthly peer-reviewed that focuses on research in the field of sports and exercise science. It was established in 1969 and is published by Lippincott Williams & Wilkins on behalf of the American College of Sports Medicine. The editor-in-chief is Andrew (Andy) Jones, Ph.D., FACSM (University of Exeter).

According to the Journal Citation Reports, the journal holds an impact factor of 6.289.
