= Leawood =

Leawood could refer to:

- Leawood, Kansas
- Leawood, Missouri
- Leawood Gardens, suburb in Adelaide, Australia
