= Josephine Langworthy Rathbone =

American physiologist

- Josephine L. Rathbone, from a 1940 newspaper.
- Born: June 25, 1899; New York City
- Died: July 3, 1989 (aged 90)
- Occupations: Physiologist, educator, college professor, writer

Josephine Langworthy Rathbone (June 25, 1899 – July 3, 1989) was an American physiologist whose research and work involved physical education and relaxation. She taught at Teachers College, Columbia University from 1930 to 1958, and was a founding member of the American College of Sports Medicine (ACSM).

== Early life ==
Josephine Langworthy Rathbone was born in New York City and raised in East Orange, New Jersey, the daughter of Henry Bailey Rathbone and Floy Pearl Langworthy Rathbone. As a child, she published The Mardean Review, a neighborhood newsletter, with her younger brother. She attended Wellesley College, where she survived the 1918 Influenza pandemic, and studied psychology with Eleanor Gamble. She earned a bachelor's degree in zoology in 1921, a teaching certificate in 1922, and a master's degree in 1923. In 1936 she earned one of the first doctoral degrees granted in physical therapy at Columbia University. Her doctoral thesis was titled Residual neuromuscular hypertension: implications for education.

== Career ==
=== Academic career ===
Rathbone spent a summer at Woods Hole Oceanographic Institution, and taught at New Britain Normal School as a new college graduate. She taught hygiene and physical education and coached rowing at Wellesley for five years. She was professor of health and physical education at Teachers College, Columbia University from 1930 to 1958. She emphasized the need for American troops, athletes, and working women to learn and practice relaxation techniques for better health and performance. At Columbia she ran a relaxation clinic, treating patients for whom relaxation was prescribed but difficult, and introduced ideas from yoga into physical therapy work. She was later on the faculty at Springfield College in Massachusetts, from 1959 to 1980.

=== Writing ===
She wrote a popular textbook in her field, Corrective Physical Education (1934), and Recreation in Total Rehabilitation (1959, with Carol Lucas). She also wrote books for a general readership, including Health in Your Daily Living (1948, with Frank S. Rathbone) and Teach Yourself to Relax (1957). "In this chaotic world, with its widespread political and economic experimentation," she wrote in the opening lines of another book, Relaxation (1943), "the human element is threatened as never before. Its goals are indistinct and unsatisfying. It has no sense of security. It is being driven to overexertion in response to the demand for maximum production and all-out effort." She also wrote syndicated newspaper columns on relaxation in the 1950s.

=== Organizations ===
Rathbone and her husband were founders of the Federation of Sports Medicine in 1954. The organization soon changed its name to the American College of Sports Medicine (ACSM). She was awarded the ACSM's highest honor in 1974, to mark the twentieth anniversary of its founding. She served a term as vice-president of the American Physical Therapy Association in the 1930s. She was also a fellow of the American Association for Health, Physical Education, and Recreation (AAHPRD), and served on national committees of the YMCA and American Physical Education Association.

== Personal life ==
Rathbone married fellow physiologist Peter V. Karpovich in 1945. Karpovich died in 1975. Josephine L. Rathbone died in 1989, aged 90 years. Her papers, including a memoir "My Twentieth Century", are held at Springfield College.

== Works ==
- Rathbone, Josephine L. (March 1937). "Residual Neuromuscular Hypertension: Implication for Physiotherapy". Physical Therapy. 17 (2): 43–46. doi:10.1093/ptj/17.2.043.
