= Infectious diseases (athletes) =

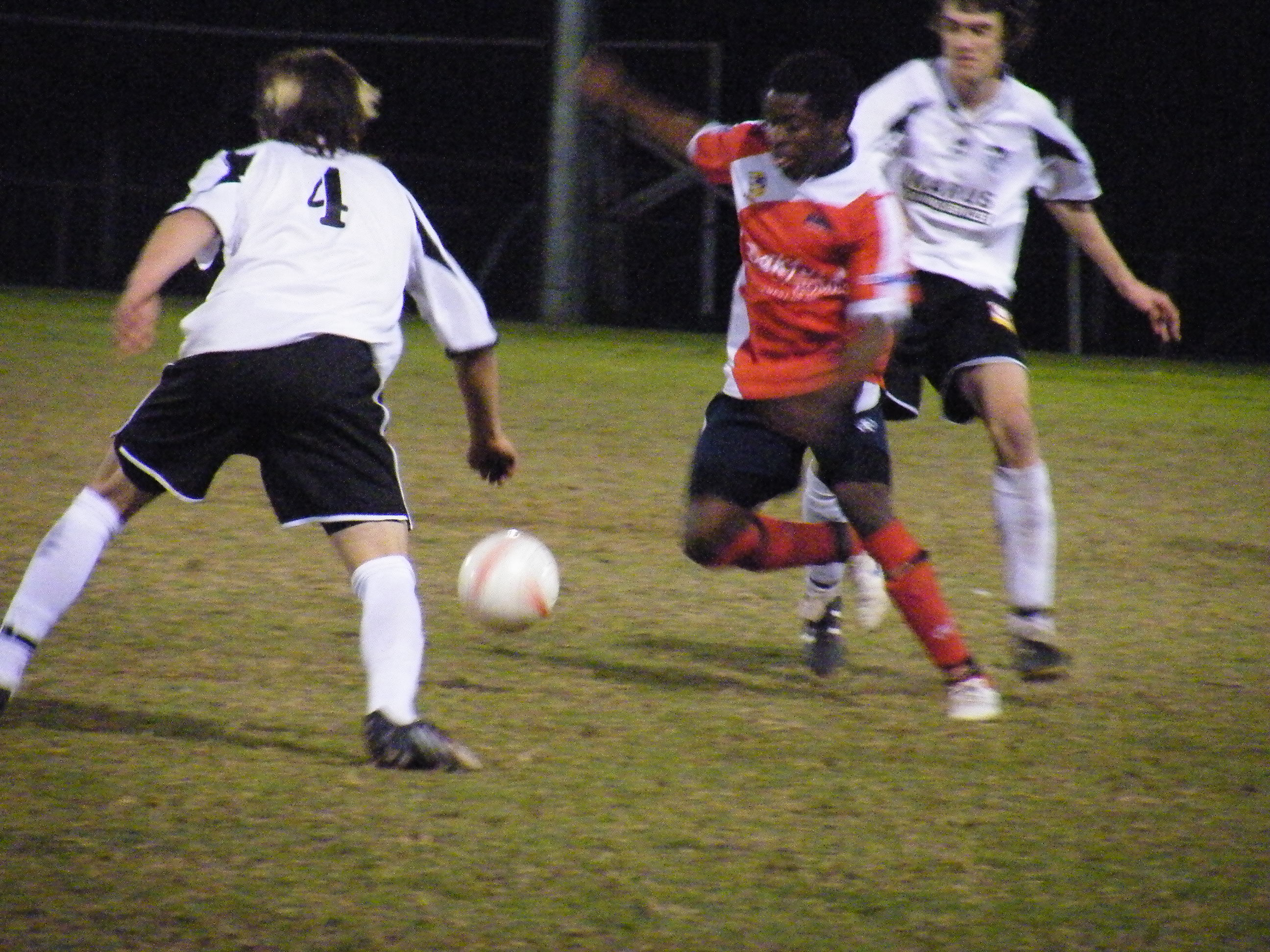

Infectious diseases are often a serious issue for athletes, and those in the care of athletes must often be alert to the possibility of getting an infectious disease for the following reasons:

- There is the chance, or even the expectation, of contact or collision with another player, or the playing surface, which may be a mat or artificial turf.
- The opportunities for skin breaks, obvious or subtle, are present and compromise skin defenses.
- Young people congregate in dormitories, locker rooms, showers, etc.
- There is the possibility of sharing personal toilet articles.
- Equipment, gloves and pads and protective gear, is difficult to sanitize and can become contaminated.

However, in many cases, the chance of infection can be reduced by relatively simple measures.

== Herpes gladiatorum ==
Wrestlers use mats which are abrasive and the potential for a true contagion (Latin contagion-, contagio, from contingere to have contact with) is very real. The herpes simplex virus, type I, is very infectious and large outbreaks have been documented. A major epidemic threatened the 2007 Minnesota high school wrestling season, but was largely contained by instituting an eight-day isolation period during which time competition was suspended. Practices, such as 'weight cutting', which can at least theoretically reduce immunity, might potentiate the risk. In non-epidemic circumstances, herpes gladiatorum affects about 3% of high school wrestlers and 8% of collegiate wrestlers. There is the potential for prevention of infection, or at least containment, with antiviral agents which are effective in reducing the spread to other athletes when given to those who are herpes positive, or who have recurrent herpes gladiatorum. The NCAA specifies that a wrestler must:
- be free of systemic symptoms (fever, malaise, etc.).
- have developed no new blisters for 72 hours before the examination.
- have no moist lesions; all lesions must be dried and have progressed to a FIRM ADHERENT CRUST.
- have been on appropriate systemic antiviral therapy for at least 120 hours before and at the time of the meet or tournament.

Active herpetic infections shall not be covered to allow participation.

== Impetigo ==
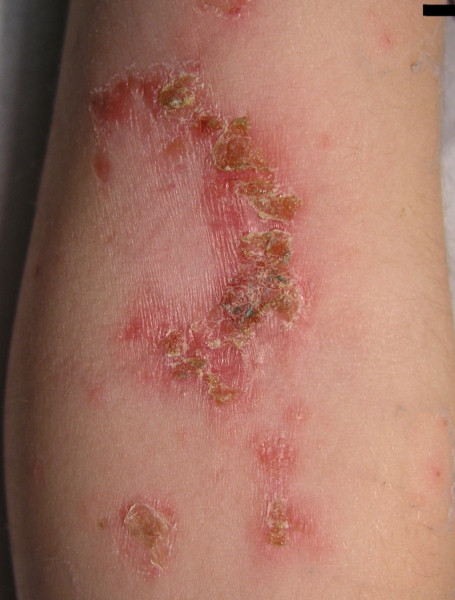

This superficial intra-dermal infection spreads by contact. A red, tender 'spot' quickly develops blisters or vesicles which rupture to develop a golden crust. Over the past 20 years, the pathogen has changed from being overwhelmingly hemolytic streptococcal to staphylococcus aureus (80%), streptococcal (10%), and the remainder due to a combination of the two.
The lesions appear most frequently on the face, around the mouth or nose, but there are often multiple sites that may include the buttocks and trunk. There is a seasonal predilection for summer and fall and contact sport is a definite risk factor. Amongst other regulations, the NCAA require an absence of new lesions for 48 hours before a meet or tournament, and at least 72 hours of completed antibiotic therapy.

The NCAA specifies that a wrestler must:
- not have developed any new skin lesion for 48 hours before a meet or tournament
- have no moist or exudative lesions at meet or tournament time
Gram stain of exudate from questionable lesions (if available) should be performed.
Active purulent(pus discharging) lesions shall not be covered to allow participation.

== Ringworm ==
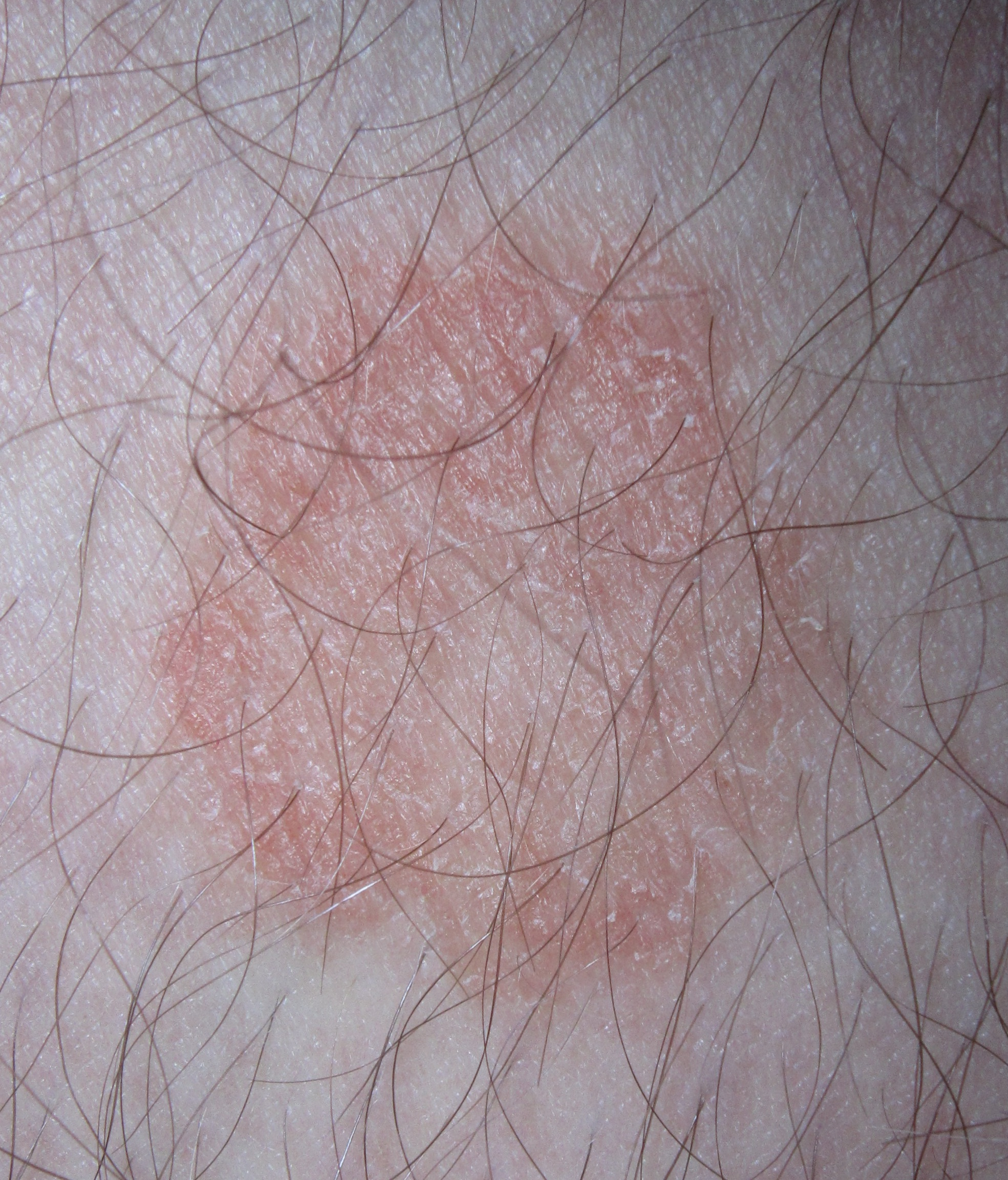

Ringworm, more properly called Tinea, presents as a reddish/brown raised or bumpy patch which may be lighter in the center, giving the appearance of a ring. It is caused by one of three parasitic fungi and is named after the body site involved. Consequently, the name does not indicate the fungal type, for example, Tinea corporis (body) and Tinea manum (hand). Ringworm spreads readily by direct skin-to-skin contact, and by using a contaminated hairbrush or other source. Some studies have indicated that spread may be reduced by prophylaxis with anti-fungal agents applied to the skin. Again, there are NCAA prohibitions on participation unless lesions are completely and securely covered in wrestling, or that one week of treatment has been completed in case of extensive involvement.
The NCAA specifies that to participate:
- at least 72 hours of topical therapy is required for skin lesions.
- at least two weeks of systemic antifungal therapy is required for scalp lesions.
- wrestlers with extensive and active lesions will be disqualified and those with localized lesions will be disqualified if such lesions cannot be "properly covered".
- the disposition of tinea cases will be decided on an individual basis as determined by the examining physician and/or certified athletic trainer.

== Infectious mononucleosis ==
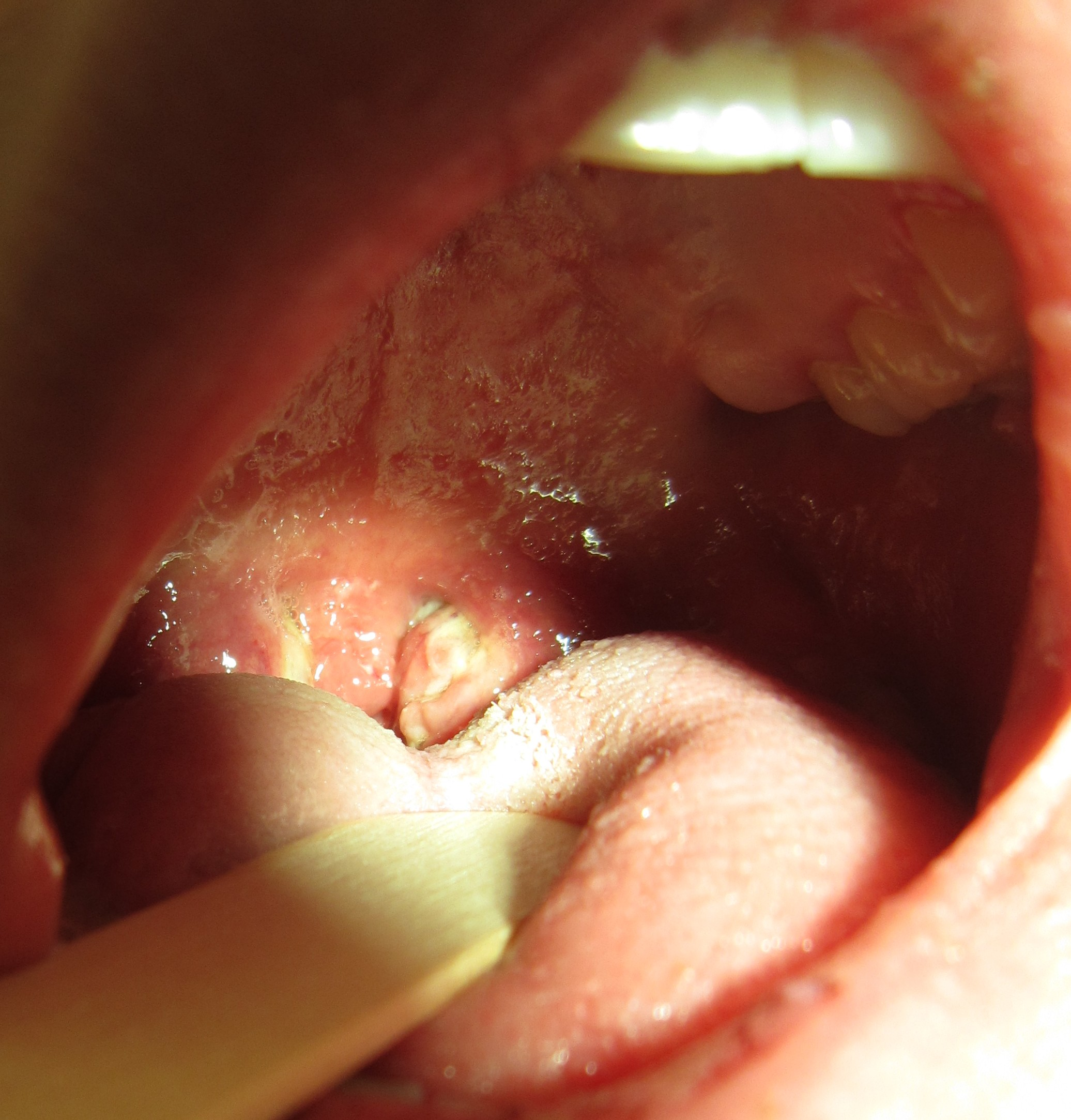

This was recognized as a clinical syndrome in the 1800s consisting of fever, pharyngitis and adenopathy. The term glandular fever was first used in 1889 and the association with Epstein-Barr virus infection in the late 1960s. Sprunt and Evans described the characteristics of Epstein-Barr virus infectious mononucleosis in 1920. It is primarily transmitted by oropharyngeal secretions. A study demonstrated that 13% of susceptible university freshmen developed antibodies to Epstein-Barr virus within nine months of enrollment. Seventy-four percent of those developed the clinical syndrome recognized as infectious mononucleosis.

Of most importance in the care of the athlete is the enlargement of the spleen, which may extend beyond the protection normally offered by the lower ribs, and also be softer and consequently more vulnerable to rupture. Most patients do not have a palpable spleen on examination and the sensitivity of physical examination for splenic enlargement has been estimated at about 6%, (94% undetected).

The risk of rupture during infectious mononucleosis has been estimated at one per thousand and one review indicated that almost all ruptures occurred in the first three weeks. This has led to the suggestion that athletes be withheld from exertion for a minimum of four weeks from the onset of illness. Others have suggested ultrasound examination at three weeks to assist with decision making concerning return to activity.

== Methicillin-resistant Staphylococcus aureus ==
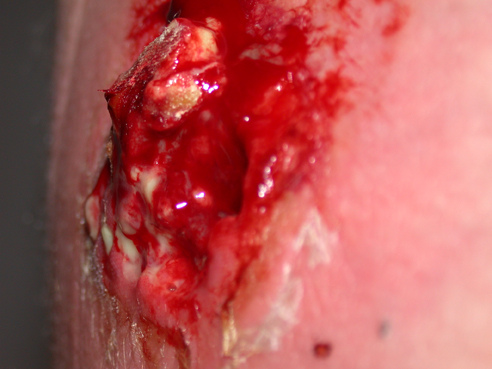

MRSA refers to a resistant variation of a common bacterium which has evolved to survive beta-lactam antibiotics, including penicillin and methicillin. First discovered in the United Kingdom in 1961, it is now worldwide. It is popularly referred to as a "superbug", more appropriately as multiple resistant Staphylococcus aureus. It most commonly colonizes the anterior third of the nasal cavity and otherwise healthy people may carry MRSA without symptoms, from weeks to years.

There are three postulates relating to the development of multiple resistant 'staph'. One is the widespread, inappropriate use of antibiotics particularly for viral infections where they can do no good. Another is the inclusion of antibiotics in animal feed. A third is simply genetic selection of the "fittest bacteria". The commonest presentations include pustules, furuncles, carbuncles and abscesses, although misdiagnosis as a "spider bite" is not uncommon.

The Centers for Disease Control have defined the five "C's" that make up the major risk factors as Crowding, frequent skin Contact, Compromised skin, sharing Contaminated personal care items, and lack of Cleanliness. Consequently, it is incumbent on those who look after athletes to stress adequate hygiene, cover open lesions completely with clean, dry dressings, advise against sharing of towels, bar soap, and personal care items, disinfect surfaces that contact bare skin and maintain equipment hygienically.

== Hepatitides and Human immunodeficiency virus ==
Hepatitis B, hepatitis C and Human immunodeficiency virus infection are classical examples of blood-borne diseases. Unlike hepatitis A, which is spread by the fecal-oral route and is indicative of a breakdown in food safety or potable water protection, hepatitis B, C and HIV are spread by contact with bodily fluids, most frequently blood, although in the case of HIV, not exclusively so. Also, unlike hepatitis A in which the sufferer almost always recovers completely, or rarely dies, both hepatitis B and C often give rise to chronic carrier states and indolent disease in many. At present, Hepatitis C is the most common reason for liver transplantation in the US while HIV is currently incurable, although its clinical course can be modified. In any case, between them, they have changed awareness of infectious disease in sports, and certainly changed management on the playing surface. Ironically, evidence for transmission of any of the three as a result of injury and/or contact on the playing surface is exceedingly limited and the greatest risk to the athlete surrounds behavior that may take place off court. A case report in 1982 described 5 of 10 members of a Japanese high school sumo wrestling club who contracted hepatitis. It was hypothesized that spread had occurred through skin cuts and abrasions. An outbreak of HBV in an American football team was reported in 2000. Eleven of 65 athletes were found to be HBV positive in a 19-month surveillance period. Contact with open wounds of an HBV carrier was again hypothesized. Both of those case reports originated in Japan. HBV transmission has been estimated to be 50 to 100 times more likely than the risk of transmission of HIV. HBV is also more environmentally stable, is resistant to alcohol and some detergents, and to be capable of surviving on environmental surfaces for more than seven days. The risk of transmission in sport has been estimated at between one transmission in every 10,000 to 50,000 games to one transmission in every 850,000 to 4.25 million games. These calculations are based on the estimated prevalence of HBV among athletes and it should be appreciated that aggressive and successful HBV immunization programs have been promoted since. Another study has described the prevalence of HBV infection in athletes as being no different from blood donors of the same age. Regardless, prudent preventive measures as advocated by the Pediatrics Committee on Sports Medicine and Fitness and paraphrased as follows are in wide use:

- Athletes should not share personal items, such as razors, toothbrushes, and nail clippers.
- Athletes must cover areas of broken skin with an occlusive dressing before and during participation.
- Disposable vinyl or latex gloves should be worn to avoid contact with blood or other bodily fluids visibly tinged with blood and any object such as equipment, bandages or uniforms contaminated with these fluids.
- Athletes with active bleeding should be removed from competition as soon as possible and the bleeding stopped. Wounds should be cleaned with soap and water. Skin antiseptics may be used if soap and water are not available. Wounds must be covered with an occlusive dressing that remains intact during play before athletes return to competition.
- Minor cuts or abrasions that are not bleeding do not require interruption of play but can be cleaned and covered during scheduled breaks. During these breaks, if an athlete's equipment or uniform fabric is wet with blood, the equipment should be cleaned and disinfected, or the uniform should be replaced.
- Equipment and playing areas contaminated with blood must be cleaned until all visible blood is gone and then disinfected with an appropriate germicide such as a freshly made bleach solution containing one part bleach in 10 parts of water. The decontaminated equipment or area should be in contact with the bleach solution for at least 30 seconds. The area may be wiped with a disposable cloth after the minimum contact time or be allowed to air dry.

These recommendations are echoed and expanded in the Sports Medicine Handbook of the National Collegiate Athletic Association.
