= Clinical Journal of Sport Medicine =

- Discipline: Sports medicine
- Language: English
- Edited by: Chris Hughes

Publication details
- History: 1990–present
- Publisher: Lippincott Williams & Wilkins
- Frequency: Bimonthly
- Open access: Hybrid
- Impact factor: 3.165 (2019)

Standard abbreviations
- ISO 4: Clin. J. Sport Med.

Indexing
- ISSN: 1050-642X (print); 1536-3724 (web)

Links
- Journal homepage

The Clinical Journal of Sport Medicine (CJSM) is a peer-reviewed medical journal in the sports medicine field. It is published by Lippincott Williams & Wilkins. It was established in 1990 by the Canadian Academy of Sport and Exercise Medicine with Gordon Matheson as the founding editor. It is also the official journal of the Australasian College of Sport and Exercise Physicians, the American Medical Society for Sports Medicine (AMSSM) and American Osteopathic Academy of Sports Medicine. It is the pre-eminent non-surgical sports medicine journal of North America. In North America (USA and Canada), sports medicine is a subspecialty field of medicine with an even split between surgical and non-surgical subspecialties. The surgical branch of sports medicine is a subspecialty field of orthopedics, whereas the non-surgical branch draws from specialties including family practice, physiatry, pediatrics, internal medicine and emergency medicine. The journal editor-in-chief is Christopher Hughes.

== Abstracting and indexing ==
It has a current ranking of Orthopedics 16/82, Sport Sciences 16/85 and Physiology 22/81 with an Impact Factor of 3.165. These rankings generally place the journal in the top quartile of the fields related to sports medicine.

== Concussion in sport articles ==
A specific focus of research is sports concussion articles, with many of these housed in a specific collection.

== Consensus statement articles ==
CJSM publishes regular consensus statements from bodies such as the AMSSM and others.
