= American College of Sports Medicine =

Membership organization of sports medicine and exercise science professionals

- Abbreviation: ACSM
- Formation: 1954
- Headquarters: Indianapolis, Indiana
- Members: 50,000+
- CEO: Katie Feltman
- Website: https://www.acsm.org/

The American College of Sports Medicine (ACSM), headquartered in Indianapolis, Indiana, is a sports medicine and exercise science membership organization. Founded in 1954, ACSM holds conferences, publishes books and journals, and offers certification programs for personal trainers and exercise physiologists.

== History ==
The American College of Sports Medicine was founded in 1954 as the "Federation of Sports Medicine" in New York City at the Hotel Statler on April 22, as part of the afternoon program of the American Association for Health, Physical Education, and Recreation (AAHPER). The following year, the American College of Sports Medicine (ACSM) was officially incorporated, and 11 individuals were designated as founders. This group was composed of seven men and one woman with careers in physical education, as well as three physicians. The physical educators were Clifford Brownell, Ph.D. Ernst Jok, M.D., Peter Karpovich, M.D., Leonard Larson, Ph.D. Grover Mueller, M.S., Neils Neilson, Ph.D., Josephine Rathbone, Ph.D. and Arthur Steinhaus, Ph.D. Although they had training in physical education or were employed in departments of physical education, Jokl, Larson, Karpovich, and Steinhaus were primarily involved in research dealing with the physiology of exercise. The physicians were Louis Bishop, M.D., Albert Hyman, M.D., and Joseph Wolffe, M.D. All three were practicing cardiologists.

The ACSM national headquarters moved to Indianapolis in 1984, joining organizations such as the National Collegiate Athletic Association, the National Federation of State High School Associations, and national sport-specific governing bodies.

== Membership ==
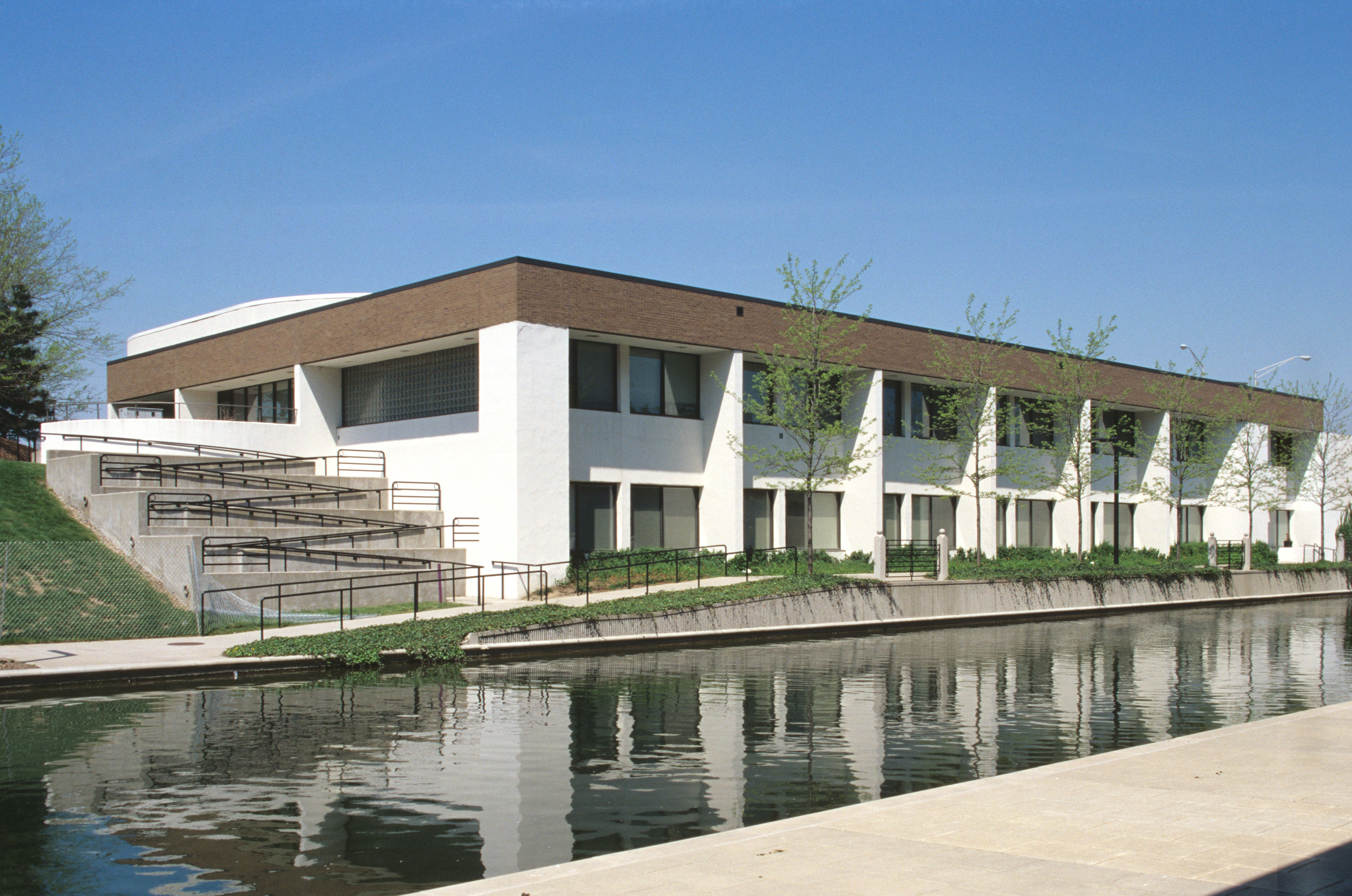
1998. Camera facing northwest from east side of Central Canal. Two story building; ramp access to canal on left side of building.

In the early 21st century, the ACSM had more than 20,000 national and international membership is offered in four categories:

- Alliance of Health Fitness Professionals
- Professional
- Professional-in-Training
- Students

== Regional chapters ==
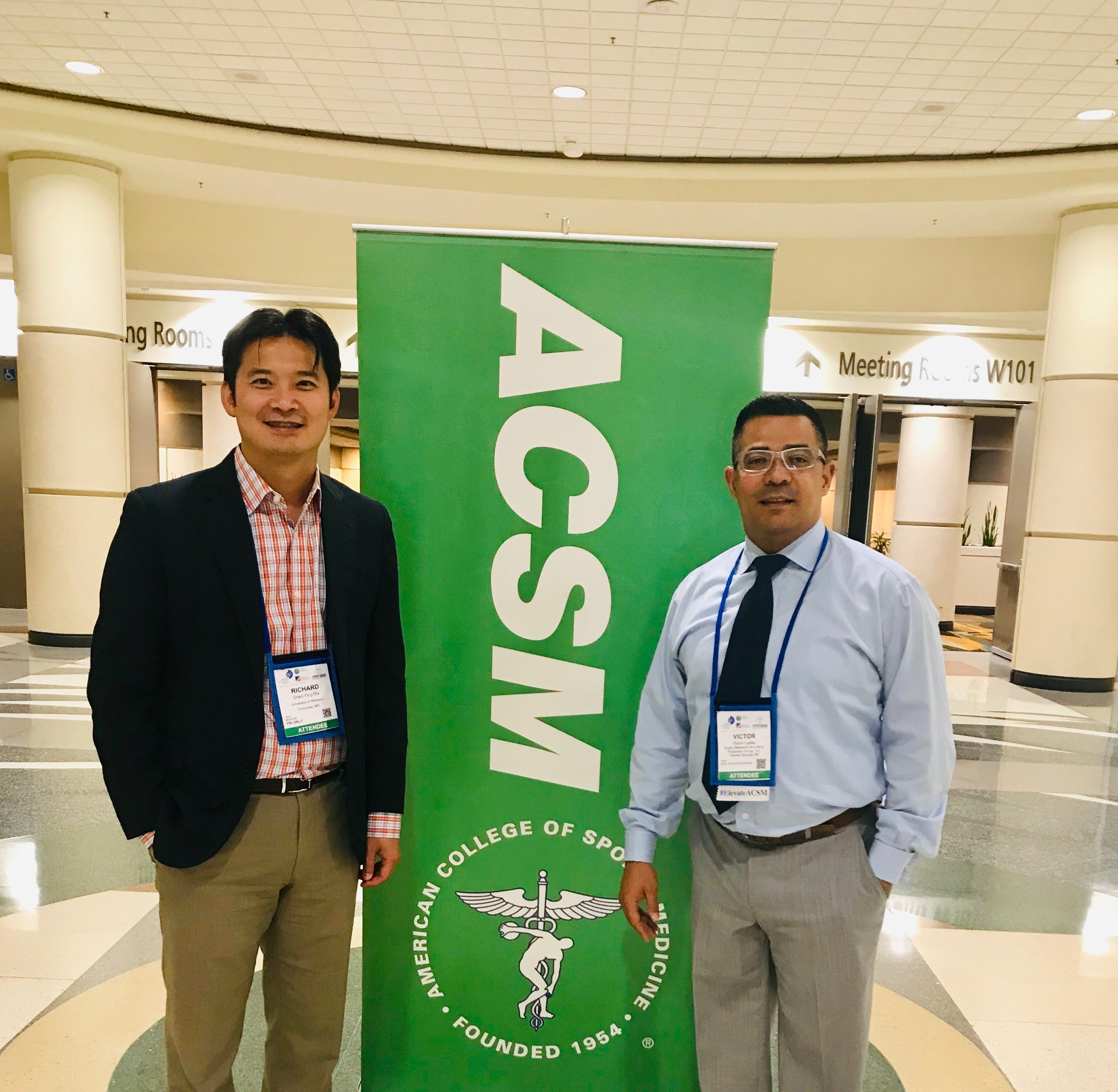
2019 ACSM Annual Meeting

ACSM has 11 regional chapters throughout the United States:

- Central States ACSM Regional Chapter
- Greater New York ACSM Regional Chapter
- Mid-Atlantic ACSM Regional Chapter
- Midwest ACSM Regional Chapter
- New England ACSM Regional Chapter
- Northland ACSM Regional Chapter
- Northwest ACSM Regional Chapter
- Rocky Mountain ACSM Regional Chapter
- Southeast ACSM Regional Chapter
- Southwest ACSM Regional Chapter
- Texas ACSM Regional Chapter

== Journals, books and publications ==
The American College of Sports Medicine publishing program includes six journals, several books and various multimedia resources.

=== Journals ===
ACSM's six leading scholarly journals include research, clinical reports and health-and-fitness information.

- Medicine & Science in Sports & Exercise
- Exercise and Sport Sciences Reviews
- Current Sports Medicine Reports
- ACSM's Health & Fitness Journal
- Translational Journal of the American College of Sports Medicine
- Exercise, Sport, and Movement

=== Books ===
ACSM publishes several books and multimedia resources.

ACSM is best known for ACSM's Guidelines for Exercise Testing and Prescription, first published in 1975.

Some of ACSM's most popular titles include:

- ACSM's Clinical Exercise Physiology
- ACSM's Complete Guide to Fitness and Health
- ACSM's Health/Fitness Facility Standards and Guidelines
- ACSM's Introduction to Exercise Science
- ACSM's Nutrition for Exercise Science
- ACSM's Resources for the Exercise Physiologist
- ACSM's Resources for the Personal Trainer
- ACSM's Foundations of Strength Training and Conditioning

== Certifications ==
ACSM offers different certifications for fitness and clinical exercise professionals, and a number of credential and specialty certificate programs.

- Group Exercise Instructor
- Certified Personal Trainer
- Certified Exercise Physiologist
- Certified Clinical Exercise Physiologist

== Foundation ==
The American College of Sports Medicine Foundation is a 501(c)(3) nonprofit organization affiliated with and developed to support the American College of Sports Medicine, Inc. Each year the ACSM Foundation awards more than $100,000 in research awards and scholarships.

== See also ==
- Board of Certification, Inc.
- Personal Trainer
- Sports Medicine
- Exercise is Medicine
- ACSM American Fitness Index
