= Exercise Is Medicine =

Nonprofit initiative

Exercise is Medicine (EIM) is a nonprofit initiative co-launched on November 5, 2007, by the American College of Sports Medicine and the American Medical Association, with support from the Office of the Surgeon General and the 18th Surgeon General Regina Benjamin.

== Overview and history ==
The Exercise is Medicine (EIM) initiative calls for physical activity to be included as a standard part of medical treatment and the patient care process. EIM urges healthcare providers to assess the physical activity levels of their patients at every visit, provide physically inactive patients with brief counseling, and 'write' a basic exercise prescription. Before leaving the clinic setting, inactive patients should also receive a referral to available physical activity resources in the community to assist with becoming more physically active. EIM should be differentiated from Exercise Medicine, which is a medical specialty that exists in some countries, as part of Sport & Exercise Medicine.

EIM was started by American College of Sports Medicine President Robert E. Sallis, MD, FACSM in 2007, who has continued to serve as the chair of the EIM initiative since its inception. Under the guidance of Dr. Sallis and the EIM advisory board, Adrian Hutber, PhD, served as the first vice president and has overseen the global development of the initiative over its first decade of existence. From 2007 to 2017, EIM grew into a "global health" initiative with a presence in more than 40 countries worldwide. The initial five years of the initiative focused on increasing global awareness that "exercise is good medicine". More recently, efforts have shifted toward the strategic implementation of the EIM Solution in healthcare systems.

== Implementation ==
The Exercise is Medicine Solution is the practical implementation of EIM in a health system. The EIM Solution is designed as a simple, brief four-step process that can be carried out in the clinical setting in under five minutes by the entire healthcare team.

1. The first step, and initiator, of the EIM Solution, is the systematic assessment of every patient's physical activity levels. The Physical Activity Vital Sign is an evidence- and practice-based tool consisting of two questions to determine whether the patient is meeting the established physical activity guidelines. This tool for assessing patient physical activity levels has been successfully integrated into several healthcare systems including the Kaiser Permanente health systems of Northern and Southern California, as well as in Intermountain Health.
2. The second step is to provide brief advice or counseling regarding the importance of regular physical activity, specifically relevant to that patient's medical history and situation. Several physical activity counseling models have been shown to be effective in increasing patient physical activity levels including the "5As" (Ask, Advise, Agree, Assist, Arrange), motivational interviewing, and the use of the transtheoretical model.
3. The third step of the EIM Solution is to provide eligible patients (i.e., patients who are not completing 150 minutes of moderate to vigorous aerobic activity in a week) with a basic physical activity prescription, depending on the health, fitness level, and preferences of the patient. Prescriptions can be given out in a number of different formats including exercise prescriptions entered into the electronic health record and provided to the patient in the after-visit summary paperwork or a pad (a format patients are familiar with in receiving prescriptions for medications). The first major exercise prescription program was the Green Prescription started by the Sport and Recreation New Zealand in 1998.
4. The final, and perhaps most crucial, component of the EIM Solution is ensuring that all eligible patients receive a physical activity referral to supportive resources to assist them in engaging in greater physical activity levels. Patients may be referred to existing physical activity resources within a health system (i.e., wellness programs, cardiac rehabilitation programs, physical therapy), self-directed programs (i.e., walking programs, smartphone apps), or community-based resources. Within the community setting, all physical activity places (i.e., YMCA centers, Jewish Community Centers, and other community fitness centers), and exercise professionals should be considered for inclusion in a physical activity network.

== The EIM Global Health Network ==
Over its first decade of existence, EIM has expanded to include partners in more than 40 countries. The EIM Global Health Network consists of EIM Regional Centers in Chile (EIM Latin America), Germany (EIM Europe), and Singapore (EIM Southeast Asia) that help oversee the expansion and development of the initiative in their respective regions.

To establish an EIM National Center, national leaders in a country are required to enlist the support of a national primary care organization, a national sports medicine and/or exercise science organization, as well as a leading academic institution. It is also strongly encouraged that the National Ministry of Health is invited to participate as a part of the National Center. The National Center is hosted by a national institution (an academic institution, health organization, or other non-profit organization) under the direction of a National Center Director, acting on behalf of the National Center Advisory Board.

== See also ==
- Exercise prescription
- Physical therapy
- Exercise Medicine
