= British Association of Sport and Exercise Medicine =

The British Association of Sport and Exercise Medicine (BASEM) is the British professional association for sports medicine in the United Kingdom.

== History ==
It was founded in 1952 at Westminster Hospital, as the British Association of Sport Medicine (BASM). From the 1960s it worked with the British Olympic Association (BOA).

In the 1960s it looked at the medical ethics of the sport of boxing, due to the serious brain injuries, with doctors at the Royal National Throat, Nose and Ear Hospital. It brought in new rules for boxing in January 1964 with the British Boxing Board of Control. If a match was suspended from a knockout or a boxer was counted out, that boxer could not compete for at least 21 days. It worked with the Amateur Boxing Association, now known as England Boxing. In 1969 the Royal College of Physicians had found that one in six boxers would later suffer long-term neurological damage (chronic traumatic encephalopathy).

It worked heavily with the detection of unethical substances that would possibly enhance performance, and sports injuries.

A similar organisation, the British Association of Sports Science (BASS), was founded in 1984.

== Structure ==
It is headquartered in Auckley on the B1396, east of Doncaster, South Yorkshire, near the airport, and near The Hayfield School. It is a member of the Fédération Internationale de Medicine Sportive (International Federation of Sports Medicine). It was incorporated as a company in November 1985 when known as the British Association of Sport and Medicine (BASM).

== Function ==
It produces the British Journal of Sports Medicine, published by BMJ.

== See also ==
- Amateur Athletic Association of England (AAA)
- National Centre for Sport and Exercise Medicine (NCSEM)
