= Exercise prescription =

Fitness-related activity plan for a specified purpose

Exercise prescription commonly refers to the specific plan of fitness-related activities that are designed for a specified purpose, which is often developed by a fitness or rehabilitation, or Exercise medicine specialist for the client or patient. Due to the specific and unique needs and interests of the client/patient, the goal of exercise prescription should focus on motivation and customization, thus making achieving goals more likely to become successful. Exercise prescription should take into account the patient's medical history, and a pre-examination of a patient's physical fitness to make sure a person has the capacity to perform the exercises.

== Patient referral ==
In the United Kingdom there is a scheme called "Exercise on prescription" or "Exercise Referral" in which doctors are able to prescribe exercise to those with conditions that benefit from it, such as asthma, depression, or obesity. The initiative particularly aimed to lower the rate of heart disease. National standards for such initiatives from doctors were established by the Department of Health in 2001. Exercise on prescription aims to prevent deterioration of conditions, and views exercise as a preventative health measure. Fitness classes or a course at the local gym are available on prescription at a reduced rate to people who might benefit from them. It aims to make it easier for people to follow their doctors' advice about taking more exercise or losing weight. Such preventative measures hope to lead to savings for the National Health Service.

Researchers in New Zealand have also discussed the benefits of exercise referral by medical practitioners there. In New Zealand it is known as a green prescription, while in the United States a similar initiative is known as Exercise is Medicine. A green prescription is a referral given by a doctor or nurse to a patient, with exercise and lifestyle goals written on them. The term, used by health practitioners in New Zealand draws parallel to the usual prescriptions given to patients for medications, and emphasizes the importance of exercise in improving their condition, and not relying on drugs. The green prescription is written after discussing the issues and goals in the consultation. Studies have shown that an increase in exercise, better sense of well-being, and a decrease in blood pressure results from using the method. A decreased risk of coronary heart disease has not been shown. This was shown in two studies, one that surveyed patients in Auckland and Dunedin, and another that was done in 42 practices in the same region of New Zealand.

General practitioners like the idea as it formalizes what they are telling the patient about how their lifestyle changes are necessary. There has previously not been sufficient education of general practitioners on Exercise Prescription, compared to drug and procedural education, although the need to confidently prescribe exercise increases as the evidence shows of its benefits. If not confident or in difficult cases, General practitioners can refer on to Exercise physiologists, Physiotherapists or Sport & Exercise medicine specialists.

Research in Australia has suggested that an exercise prescription program would be very beneficial and many ICU physiotherapists are already performing this practice, however there is no national standards to govern how this practice is administered so there is great variety in the ways this is administered therefore more research is needed.

== For specific diseases ==
=== Osteoarthritis ===
Studies show that exercise prescription aids in both preventing and minimizing the effects of joint disorders such as osteoarthritis. Evidence shows that in addition to the general physiological, psychological and functional benefits gained from exercise, greater quadriceps strength has a mitigating effect on knee joint pain.

=== Depression ===
A large body of research indicates that exercise prescription has beneficial effects for patients with depression. One study shows a significant improvement for a randomized group of women with major depressive disorder engaging in a twice-weekly resistance training program compared to a control group. The reasons for this marked change is thought to have biochemical, physiological and psychosocial aspects.

=== Migraine ===
Although routine physical activity could be an aggravating factor for migraine, physical exercise is considered to be part of a non-pharmacological strategy for migraine prevention. Migraine patients tend to have less pleasure in physical activity due to fear-avoidance and anxiety sensitivity.

=== Peripheral arterial disease (PAD) ===
Blockage or closing of the arteries of the lower limbs impairs blood flow to the legs and results in significant reduction in physical capacity. Alternate exercise prescriptions to walking are considered. Aerobic exercises such as arm-cranking or cycling are recommended. Risk factors for disease progression should also be taken into account when aiming to improve waling ability. Functional capacity should be determined prior to commencement of prescribe exercise programs.

=== Diabetes mellitus ===
The number of individuals diagnosed with diabetes mellitus are rapidly increasing and a lot of evidence suggests this is due to an insufficiently active lifestyle. Benefits of exercise include stress reduction, reduced risk of heart disease, lowers blood pressure, helps control weight and aids insulin in improving management of diabetes. Exercise that is not too strenuous is recommended. Such activities may include walking, swimming, gardening, cycling or golfing. Incidental activities are encouraged, such as using the stairs instead of an escalator/lift or walking short distances instead of driving. Dr. Gebel, who works at James Cook University's Centre for Chronic Disease Prevention, conducted a study reporting increased health benefits through incorporation of more vigorous exercise. He stated that this could include 'vigorous gardening', not necessarily meaning going to the gym. Diabetes Australia suggest 30 minutes of exercise daily as a suitable target, which can be divided into three 10-minute sessions throughout the day. Exercise programs however should be tailored and delivered by individuals with appropriate qualifications.

=== Cancer ===
Exercise is not only recommended for preventing many types of cancer, but is now recommended as part of treatment for many cancers based on the results of scientific trials.

=== Chronic obstructive pulmonary diseases (COPD) ===
Patients with COPD can have an improved quality of live if the correct exercise program is prescribed to them. This program should help increase aerobic capacity (rate that a person can take oxygen from the air), increase endurance, and decrease dyspnea (shortness of breath).

== Exercise recommendations ==
According to Exercise and Sport Science Australia, a minimum amount of 210 minutes of moderate intensity exercise or 125 minutes of vigorous intensity exercise should be performed per week. Exercise should include both aerobic and resistance training. For greater health benefits, exercise should be performed regularly with no more than a two-day gap between training sessions. Exercise that improves cardiorespiratory fitness should be done 5–7 days a week for 30 to 60 minutes at a moderate intensity. If the exercise is done at a vigorous intensity the training sessions only have to be performed 3–5 days a week for 20 to 60 minutes each session. Flexibility should be trained for at least 10 minutes after a training session and should be done at least twice a week.

=== Elderly ===
Research has found that having a well planned exercise routine can greatly benefit the elderly. It an reduce the risks of coronary heart disease, diabetes mellitus and insulin resilience, hypertension and obesity as well as vast improvements in bone density and muscle mass.

== Exercise program development ==
Exercise prescription is designed to modulate acute exercise programming variables to create the adaptations desired by the individual or sport. With aerobic exercise prescription, the type of exercise, duration of exercise, frequency, and duration is adjusted. For resistance exercise prescription, the type of exercise, total session volume, rest period, frequency, and intensity are determined. Prescription of stretching and other activities is also commonly seen. Exercise prescription can be divided into 5 components:

- Type of exercise or activity (e.g., walking, swimming, cycling)
- Specific workloads (e.g., watts, walking speed)
- Duration and frequency of the activity or exercise session
- Intensity guidelines – Target heart rate (THR) range and estimated rate of perceived exertion (RPE)
- Precautions regarding certain orthopedic (or other) concerns or related comments

== See also ==
- Exercise prescription software
- Exercise medicine
- Exercise physiology
- Green exercise
- Kinesiology
- Sports medicine
- Exercise is Medicine
