= Lippincott Williams & Wilkins =

Book-publishing imprint of Wolters Kluwer

- Parent company: Wolters Kluwer
- Founded: 1998
- Country of origin: United States
- Headquarters location: Philadelphia, Pennsylvania, U.S.
- Publication types: books, journals
- Nonfiction topics: Medicine
- Official website: www.lww.com

Lippincott Williams & Wilkins (LWW) is an American imprint of the American Dutch publishing conglomerate Wolters Kluwer. It was established by the acquisition of Williams & Wilkins and its merger with J.B. Lippincott Company in 1998. Under the LWW brand, Wolters Kluwer, through its Health Division, publishes scientific, technical, and medical content such as textbooks, reference works, and over 275 scientific journals (most of which are medical or other public health journals). Publications are aimed at physicians, nurses, clinicians, and students.

Lippincott had its headquarters in Philadelphia, Pennsylvania, with other United States locations in Baltimore, Maryland, New York City, New York, Hagerstown, Maryland, and Ambler, Pennsylvania, as well as locations in London, Hong Kong, and Sydney. Most of those offices are still in service under Wolters Kluwer.

== History ==
The publisher traces its origins to a Philadelphia bookstall opened by Benjamin Warner and Jacob Johnson in 1792. Joshua Ballinger Lippincott assumed control of the firm in 1836, and it later operated as the J. B. Lippincott Company for much of the 19th and 20th centuries.

In 1978, J.B. Lippincott Company was sold to Harper & Row, after which it shifted its publishing focus exclusively to health care. In 1990, it was sold by News Corporation to Wolters Kluwer. It was later merged with Raven Press in 1995 to become Lippincott-Raven Publishers, which then merged with Williams & Wilkins, ultimately forming Lippincott Williams & Wilkins in 1998.

LWW grew out of the gradual consolidation of various earlier independent publishers by Wolters Kluwer. Predecessor Wolters Samson acquired Raven Press of New York in 1986. Wolters Samson merged with Kluwer in 1987. The merged company bought J. B. Lippincott & Co. of Philadelphia in 1990; it merged Lippincott with the Raven Press to form Lippincott-Raven in 1995. In 1997 and 1998, Wolters Kluwer acquired Thomson Science (owner of the Current Opinion medical journals), and Plenum and merged the medical publications of each with Lippincott-Raven. In 1998, Wolters Kluwer bought Waverly, parent of Williams & Wilkins of Baltimore and merged it into Lippincott-Raven to form LWW. Waverly had acquired Lea & Febiger of Philadelphia in 1990. In 2000, Wolters Kluwer bought Springhouse Corporation from Reed Elsevier. In 2002 LWW ceased being an operating company and completed the path to being simply a brand of the conglomerate.

== See also ==
- Journals published by LWW
