= UNSW Faculty of Law and Justice =

Faculty of the University of New South Wales, Sydney, Australia

- Motto: Where Law Meets Justice
- Parent school: University of New South Wales
- Established: 1971; 55 years ago
- School type: Public
- Dean: Professor Andrew Lynch
- Location: Sydney, New South Wales, Australia; 33.917093°S 151.227890°E
- Enrollment: 2,625 (2021)
- Faculty: 116 (2021)
- Website: www.unsw.edu.au/law-justice

The Faculty of Law and Justice of the University of New South Wales is a law school situated in Sydney, Australia. It is widely regarded as one of Australia's top law schools. The 2025 QS World University Rankings ranks the UNSW Law Faculty 12th in the world, first overall for law in Australia, and 2nd in the Asia-Pacific region, and the 2021 Times Higher Education subject rankings also rank it second in Australia, making it the top ranked law school in New South Wales according to both tables, as well as being the top undergraduate Law school in the country.

The Faculty comprises the School of Global and Public Law; the School of Criminal Justice, Law and Society; and the School of Corporate and Private Law. It further comprises 13 affiliated research and specialist legal centres, including a community legal centre, the Kingsford Legal Centre, as well as the Refugee Advice and Casework Service. The Faculty is also co-founder and operator of the Australasian Legal Information Institute (AustLII), which provides free access to case law, legislation and other primary legal resources online. It offers legal education for all career stages: undergraduate law dual degree programs, the Juris Doctor for graduates, postgraduate coursework, postgraduate research, and continuing legal education short courses.

== History ==
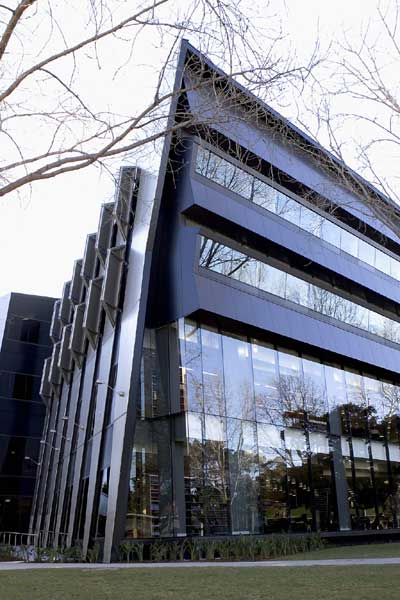
The UNSW Law Building

On 13 July 1964, the University's Council approved the creation of the UNSW Faculty of Law. On 24 January 1966, the Foundation Chair of Law was created, with the appointee to also be the Dean of the Faculty of Law. On 8 September 1969, Wootten was appointed to this position, where, in 1971, he would oversee the first teaching classes in the faculty.

The Faculty opened on 1 March 1971 with 219 undergraduate students. Prior to this, only the University of Sydney offered law degrees in New South Wales. The task of establishing the new law school was given to John Halden Wootten QC, a former judge of the Supreme Court of New South Wales, who was appointed Foundation Dean in 1969.

In 1976, the Faculty moved to occupy five floors of the UNSW Library Tower on upper campus. In 2006, the Faculty moved to a new law building on lower campus. The official opening took place on 21 September 2006 by the then Chief Justice of Australia Murray Gleeson. A quotation from Hal Wootten, Founding Dean, is set out on a wall of the law building: "a law school should have and communicate to its students a concern for those on whom the law may bear harshly."

In 2021 (the 50th anniversary of the Faculty), the Faculty was renamed to the UNSW Faculty of Law and Justice to highlight the Faculty's commitment to social justice. The new Faculty incorporates law programs as well as criminology and criminal justice. 2021 also saw the Faculty structured into three schools: Corporate and Private Law; Global and Public Law; and Criminal Justice, Law and Society.

Currently the Faculty teaches approximately 2,675 students.

== Reputation ==
=== Standing and rankings ===
In 2025, the QS World University Rankings placed UNSW Faculty of Law and Justice 12th on its list of the best law schools in the world, and first in Australia. The law school is ranked second in Australia after the University of Melbourne by the ARWU 2017 subject rankings, and second in Australia by the 2020 Times Higher Education subject rankings. The UNSW Law School was noted as one of the primary faculties in helping to place the University 1st in Australia and 33rd in the globe for most millionaires produced.

In the 2011, 2012 and 2013 Good Universities Guide, UNSW was the only law school in Australia to receive top ratings across all criteria, which include: teaching quality, generic skills, overall satisfaction, and success in obtaining a job. From 2006 to 2009, the Federal Government's assessment of excellence in tertiary education found that the Faculty lead all Australian universities for the quality of learning and teaching in law.

Among the Go8 law schools, UNSW Law topped the Quality Indicators for Learning and Teaching (QILT) 2014 survey, conducted and funded by the Australian Government Department of Education and Training, which measured the perspectives of recent students and graduates on experience as students and employment and salary outcomes. UNSW Law achieved the highest percentage in each of these categories, and continued to do so as of 2016.

=== Student achievements ===
In the past three years, five UNSW law graduates have won Rhodes scholarships. In 2018, three UNSW law graduates won New Colombo Plan Scholarships.

UNSW law students have achieved success in a number of international advocacy competitions, including:

- World Champion (2003, 2007, 2013), World Runner-Up (2005, 2016), and the Best Speaker in the English speaking rounds (2010, 2013) in the Jean-Pictet International Humanitarian Law Competition.
- World Runner-Up (2008) and World Quarter-Finalists (2013) in the Philip C. Jessup International Law Moot Court Competition.
- World Champion and Asia-Pacific Round Champion (2008) in the Manfred Lachs Space Law International Moot Competition.
- World Champion (2016, 2018) and World Runner-Up (2010) in the International Chamber of Commerce International Mediation Competition.
- Best Claimant and Best Respondent Memorandum in the World (2010) in the Willem C. Vis International Commercial Arbitration Moot.
- Semi-finalists (2013, 2014, 2015), quarter-finalists (2016), best memorials (2013, 2016), best speaker (2014) and best prosecution (2016) in the International Criminal Court Moot.

== Location ==
The Law Faculty is situated in the Law Building on the University's main campus in Kensington, Sydney.

The building is four levels high and was designed by Melbourne architects Corbet Lyons. Features of the building include light-filled atria space, open staircases, landscaped courtyards and an agora running up through floors. There are 13 classrooms with 40-plus seats, two Harvard-style lecture rooms with 90 seats and a 350-seat auditorium. Other features include a new Moot Court and student lounge. The Herbert Smith Freehills Law Library is occupied over two levels.

== Curriculum and classes ==
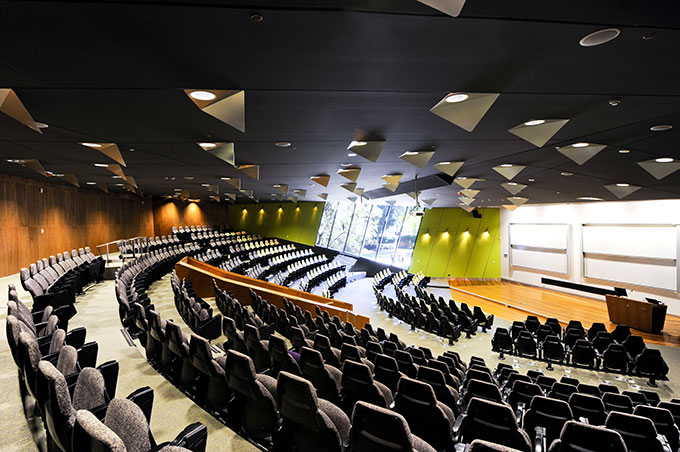
UNSW Law Building - Auditorium

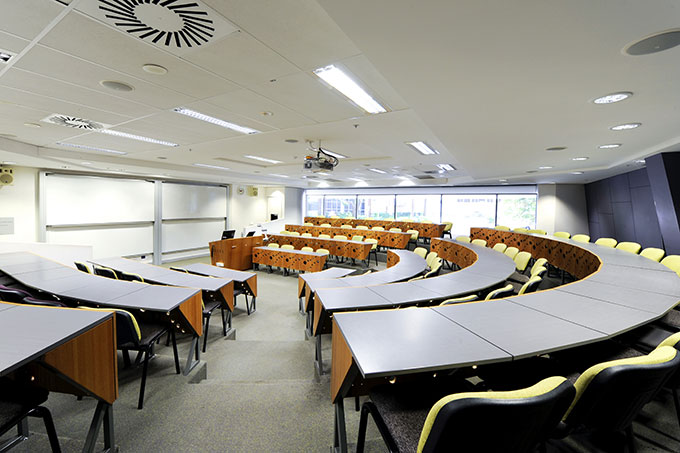
UNSW Law Building - Classroom

The Law Faculty offers both an undergraduate and a graduate law program, namely the combined Bachelor of Law (LLB) with a Bachelor in another discipline, and the graduate Juris Doctor (JD) program.

After an extensive curriculum review, the Faculty introduced a new curriculum in 2013.

=== Combined law curriculum ===
The combined law program, which involves a five-year undergraduate course of study comprising a Bachelor of Laws and a Bachelor in another discipline, is currently made up of the following course study structure:

- Year 1: Introducing Law & Justice; Torts; Principles of Private Law and five non-law courses.
- Year 2: Crime & the Criminal Process; Criminal Laws; Principles of Public Law; and five non-law courses.
- Year 3: Contracts; Lawyers, Ethics and Justice; Court Process, Evidence & Proof; Equity & Trusts; Administrative Law; and three non-law courses.
- Year 4: Resolving Civil Disputes; Federal Constitutional Law; Business Associations; Law in the Global Context; Land Law and three non-law courses.
- Year 5: Eight law electives.

For students commencing their degree before 2019, the program structure is:

- Year 1: Introducing Law & Justice; Torts; and six non-law courses.
- Year 2: Principles of Private Law; Principles of Public Law; Crime & the Criminal Process; Criminal Laws; and four non-law courses.
- Year 3: Contracts; Administrative Law; Equity & Trusts; Lawyers, Ethics and Justice; and four non-law courses.
- Year 4: Land Law; Resolving Civil Disputes; Business Associations; Court Process, Evidence & Proof; Federal Constitutional Law; Law in the Global Context; and two non-law courses.
- Year 5: Eight law electives.

=== Juris doctor curriculum ===
The Graduate Juris Doctor program, which involves a three-year graduate course of study, is made up of the following course study structure:

- Year 1: Introducing Law & Justice; Crime & the Criminal Process; Principles of Private Law; Principles of Public Law; Torts; Criminal Laws; Contracts; Lawyers, Ethics & Justice.
- Year 2: Law in the Global Context; Resolving Civil Disputes; Equity & Trusts; Administrative Law; Law & Social Theory/ Legal Theory/ Theories of Law & Justice; Court Process, Evidence & Proof; Land Law; Federal Constitutional Law.
- Year 3: Business Associations; and seven law electives.

The academic study load of the JD program differs from that of undergraduate dual law program in that for a full-time study mode it requires a full study load of four law subjects each semester in contrast to only part law study load each semester in the undergraduate dual law program.

Electives for the JD program are selected from postgraduate subjects such as those within but not limited to Master of Laws (LL.M). Core subjects in the program are taught solely within the JD cohort, with postgraduate electives taught with the postgraduate cohort and standard electives (if chosen) taught with the undergraduate dual law cohort.

The UNSW JD program has previously been criticised for over-enrollment, with reports that a few students attempted to 'buy' their way into classes for as much as $10k.

=== Class format ===
The Law Faculty does not use a lecture and tutorial system common in faculties in England and still used by some other Australian law schools. Rather, the Faculty has long conducted classes in a seminar-format. Students are asked to contribute to class discussion using the Socratic method; basic learning is done through reading materials prior to class, and class time is devoted to examining the complexities and critical exploration of the material, though the level of Socratic questioning varies between teachers and courses. First year classes ordinarily have a maximum of 28 students. Most upper-year classes have a maximum of 44 students. Some upper-year courses have up to 90 students.

=== Overseas exchange programs ===
The Law Faculty offers a number law subjects taught at overseas institutions through international arrangements, including courses at Columbia Law School, UC Berkeley School of Law, and Shanghai Jiao Tong University. It also offers exchange programs at over 60 universities, including Sciences Po, Panthéon-Assas University, University College London, Tilburg University, McGill University, National University of Singapore, University of Hong Kong, Tsinghua University, Peking University, and others.

== Admissions ==
In 2015 and 2016, entry to the undergraduate combined law program required an ATAR mark of 99.7, the highest entry requirement for admission to a law degree in Australia.

From 2017, entry into the undergraduate combined law program will be based on both an ATAR or academic result, as well as the results from a Law Admission Test (LAT) (not to be confused with the Law School Admission Test used in the United States). The test will consist of two questions requiring written responses. It is designed to assess aptitudes and skills that are relevant to success in the law program, including critical thinking and analysis, and organising and expressing ideas in a clear and fluent way. Applicants will have two hours to complete the test. The first LAT test was held on Monday 26 September 2016 for entry into 2017 admission. LAT results will be valid for two years. There are about 330 students admitted per year. (Rough estimate due to nonspecific number of 2019 student intake)|

The introduction of the LAT, allowed faculty to better differentiate candidates and was no longer a reflection on their sole performance in the ATAR. Candidates were now assessed on the basis of both their ATAR and LAT performance. Previously, in 2016 entry into the program required an ATAR mark of 99.7, this was lowered to an ATAR mark of 98 in 2017 with the introduction of the LAT. Admission to the program in 2022, required a median ATAR of 97.5 as well as student's performance in the LAT.

The UNSW JD (Juris Doctor/J.D.) is the professional law degree for graduates of disciplines other than law, or with a law degree from an overseas institution. It is the equivalent of the undergraduate Bachelor of Laws for the purpose of admission as a legal practitioner, but is only open to university graduates. Entry into the JD program is based on academic results in previous university degrees earned by the applicant. The JD is also open to international applicants. Approximately 33% of cohort holds postgraduate qualifications.

== Tuition fees ==
The undergraduate law program offers Commonwealth Supported Places (CSP).

The Juris Doctor program offers both Commonwealth Supported Places (CSP) and Full-Fee places. Commonwealth Supported Places are offered to the most competitive domestic applicants and the remaining eligible domestic applicants will be offered a full-fee place in the JD program. As a guide, to be competitive for a CSP, applicants would have achieved at least a distinction average in previous Bachelor or master's degree. Applicant's eligibility to be offered a CSP place may be improved if they have also completed an optional honours year or research degree.

The tuition fees for 2016 are as follows:

- Commonwealth Supported Places (CSP): AU$10,440 per year at Commonwealth funded Maximum Student Contribution amount (per EFTSL) as per 2016 rates.
- Full-Fee Places - Domestic: AU$38,640 per year (based on a full-time year of 48 units of credit) or $805 per unit of credit.
- Full-Fee Places - International: AU$41,040 per year (based on a full-time year of 48 units of credit) or $855 per unit of credit.

FEE-HELP is a Commonwealth government loan available to help eligible students pay part or all of their tuition fees. FEE-HELP is available only to domestic students on CSP or Full-Fee places. In 2016, the FEE-HELP limit is AU$99,389.

== Law centres within the faculty ==
There is a number of UNSW Law Centres, which contribute to the Faculty's research as well as providing internships and clinical legal education to students.

=== Andrew & Renata Kaldor Centre for International Refugee Law ===
The Andrew & Renata Kaldor Centre for International Refugee Law was founded in October 2013 by former refugees Andrew AM and Renata Kaldor AO, who were awarded honorary doctorates by UNSW in November 2018.

Dedicated to the study of international refugee law, it is a world-leading research centre. It undertakes research on displacement issues in Australia, the Asia-Pacific region and around the world, and contributes to public policy by proposing legal, sustainable and humane solutions to forced migration. In June 2019, the Centre published a document citing seven principles which should be key to Australia's refugee policy, supported by law and evidence-based research.

=== Australasian Legal Information Institute (AustLII) ===
The Australasian Legal Information Institute is operated jointly by the Faculties of Law at the UTS and the UNSW. AustLII offers free access online to case law, legislation and other primary legal resources and is "Australia's largest online legal public library."

=== Gilbert + Tobin Centre of Public Law ===
In 2000, Danny Gilbert, managing partner of law firm Gilbert + Tobin, agreed to support a centre for public law at UNSW, and in 2001 the Gilbert + Tobin Centre of Public Law was founded. It functions as a research centre specialising in constitutional and administrative law, Indigenous legal issues, and human rights. The Centre's Advisory Committee is chaired by The Hon John Basten AO KC.

The Centre has hosted a number of projects, including: the Australian Research Council Laureate Fellowship: Anti-Terror Laws and the Democratic Challenge Project; the International Refugee and Migration Law Project; the Charter of Human Rights Project; the Referendums project; the Electoral Law Project; and the Federalism Project. The Centre also hosts an annual Constitutional Law Conference attended by practitioners, academics, and judges involved or interested in public law issues.

=== Kingsford Legal Centre ===
The Faculty hosts the Kingsford Legal Centre which is both a teaching centre offering clinical legal education and a community legal centre which provides free legal advice and referral and ongoing assistance to the residents of the local area in relation to legal problems. The Centre takes on cases where there is no other source of assistance or where acting for the client will benefit the community by achieving change in the law or government policy. The Centre advises on matters including domestic violence, debt, criminal law, employment law, legal aid, victim's compensation, motor vehicle accidents, consumer matters and accidents and injuries. It has a statewide specialisation in discrimination law.

=== Others ===
As of March 2021, the following centres are also affiliated to the faculty:

- Australian Human Rights Institute
- Centre for Crime, Law & Justice
- Centre for Law, Markets & Regulation (formerly Centre for International Finance and Regulation)
- Herbert Smith Freehills China International Business and Economic Law (CIBEL) Centre
- Indigenous Law Centre

== Other groups and centres ==
There are a number of research groups attached to the Faculty of Law, including (as of July 2019)

- Environmental Law Group
- IMF Bentham Class Actions Research Initiative
- International Law & Policy Group
- Legal Education Research Group
- Network for Interdisciplinary Studies of Law
- Private Law Policy & Research Group
- Southeast Asia Law and Policy Forum
- UNSW Law Initiative for Bio-legalities

Affiliated centres:

- Australian Pro Bono Centre
- Diplomacy Training Program
- Refugee Advice & Casework Service (RACS)
- The Grata Fund
- Youth Law Australia

The Cyberspace Law and Policy Centre (formerly listed here) appears to be defunct.

== Faculty publications ==
The Faculty publishes the UNSW Law Journal, one of Australia's leading academic, peer-reviewed legal journals. The journal is produced entirely by a voluntary student board, selected on academic merit and editorial skills, and assisted from time to time by faculty advisors. Submissions for publication are received from local and international academics, judges, and legal professionals from a wide range of practice areas. The journal is distributed among a diverse set of subscribers, including judges, government departments, non-government organisations, law firms, and more than 250 universities worldwide. Four editions are published each year.

Other Faculty publications and journals include: Australian Indigenous Law Review; Australian Journal of Human Rights; Australasian Journal of Natural Resources Law and Policy; Human Rights Defender; and Indigenous Law Bulletin.

== Notable people ==
=== Faculty ===
- Lyria Bennett Moses, Professor and Head of the School of Law, Society and Criminology
- Louise Chappell, Scientia Professor and Director of the Australian Human Rights Institute
- Michael Coper, former Professor of Constitutional Law and member of the Inter-State Commission
- Nicholas Cowdery, Professorial Fellow and former NSW Director of Public Prosecutions
- James Edelman, former Conjoint Professor and current justice of the High Court of Australia
- Arthur Emmett, Adjunct Professor of Law and Acting Judge of Appeal
- Guy Goodwin-Gill, Professor of Public International Law and Deputy Director of the Kaldor Centre for International Refugee Law
- Robert Hayes, former Associate Professor of Law
- Michael Kirby, Visiting Professorial Fellow and former justice of the High Court of Australia
- Ian Ramsay, former Associate Dean
- Ronald Sackville, former Dean, Professor of Law and current Commissioner of the Royal Commission into Violence, Abuse, Neglect and Exploitation of People with Disability
- Ben Saul, former Associate Professor
- Julius Stone, former Professor of Law
- Selwyn Selikowitz, Professorial Fellow and former judge of the High Court of South Africa
- Mark Weinberg, former Professor of Law and later Commonwealth Director of Public Prosecutions and judge
- George Williams, former Dean, current Vice Chancellor of Western Sydney University
- George Winterton, former Professor of Law
- Hal Wootten, foundational Dean, Emeritus Professor of Law and founder of the Aboriginal Legal Service
- Lucia Zedner, Conjoint Professor of Criminal Justice

==== Endowed Chairs ====
- Ross Buckley, King & Wood Mallesons Chair in Disruptive Innovation and Law
- Megan Davis, Balnaves Chair in Constitutional Law and Pro Vice-Chancellor Indigenous
- Dimity Kingsford Smith, MinterEllison Chair in Risk and Regulation

=== Alumni ===
Notable alumni include:

Federal Court judges

- Annabelle Bennett (5 May 2003 - 23 March 2016)
- Anna Katzmann (2 February 2010 -)
- Brigitte Markovic (24 August 2015 -)
- Matthew Myers
- John Nicholas (16 November 2009 -)

NSW Supreme Court judges

- Natalie Adams (LLM) (5 April 2016 -)
- Trish Henry (LLB) (30 January 2019 -)
- Megan Latham (former ICAC Commissioner) (12 April 2005 -)
- Anthony Meagher (LLB) (Court of Appeal: 10 August 2011 -)
- Lucy McCallum (LLB 1986) (NSW Supreme Court: 30 January 2008; NSW Court of Appeal: 27 January 2019 -)
- Kelly Rees (LLB) (5 September 2018 -)

NSW District Court judges

- Bob Bellear, Australia's first Indigenous judge (LLB 1978)

Other judges

- David Mossop, Judge of the Supreme Court of the Australian Capital Territory
- Pat O'Shane, Magistrate; former Chancellor of the University of New England; Australia's first Aboriginal barrister (LLB 1976)
- David Wong, Chief Judge of The High Court of Sabah and Sarawak (LLB 1977)

Attorneys-General

- Brad Hazzard, former NSW Attorney-General and current Member of Parliament
- Robert McClelland, former Commonwealth Attorney-General (LLB 1981)
- Gabrielle Upton, former NSW Attorney-General and Member of the NSW Legislative Assembly for Vaucluse

Politics and government

- Elizabeth Broderick, former Australian Sex Discrimination Commissioner
- Andrew Cheng, former Member of the Legislative Council of Hong Kong
- Jason Clare, Member of the House of Representatives for Blaxland, Shadow Minister for Communications
- David Coleman, Member of the House of Representatives for Banks
- Michael Forshaw, Senator
- Peter Garrett, musician and politician, former Member of the House of Representatives for Kingsford Smith, former Commonwealth Minister for the Environment, Heritage and the Arts (LLB 1977)
- Damien Miller, Australian Ambassador to Denmark
- Melissa Parke, United Nations senior lawyer, former member of the House of Representatives for Fremantle
- Marise Payne, Senator and first female Minister for Defence
- Eleni Petinos, Member of the NSW Legislative Assembly for the district of Miranda (LLB 2011)
- Eric Roozendaal, former Treasurer of New South Wales and member of the New South Wales Legislative Council
- Paul Tse, Member of the Legislative Council of Hong Kong

Business and law

- Satyajit Das, author, international expert and consultant on financial derivatives, risk management and capital markets
- Stuart Fuller, Global Managing Partner, King & Wood Mallesons
- David Gonski, prominent businessman, Chancellor of UNSW
- Stuart Littlemore QC, barrister, writer and original host of ABC's Media Watch

Others

- Monica Attard, award-winning Australian journalist and former host of ABC's Media Watch
- Larissa Behrendt, Aboriginal writer
- Matthew Reilly, Best-selling author
- Emile Sherman, Film producer
- Rebel Wilson, Comedian and actress
