= Tickle v Giggle =

Legal case heard in the Federal Court of Australia

- Court: Federal Court of Australia
- Full case name: Roxanne Tickle v Giggle for Girls Pty Ltd (No 2)
- Decided: 23 August 2024
- Citations: [2024] FCA 960; (2024) 333 IR 296

Case history
- Prior action: Discontinued action in the Federal Circuit and Family Court of Australia (SYG808/2022)
- Appealed to: Federal Court of Australia (Full Court)

Holding
- found unlawful indirect discrimination; upheld the SDA's gender-identity provisions as within Commonwealth power; upheld Queensland birth-certificate law

Court membership
- Judge sitting: Robert Bromwich

Area of law
- discrimination, gender recognition

Giggle v Tickle
- Court: Federal Court of Australia (Full Court)
- Full case name: Giggle for Girls Pty Ltd v Roxanne Tickle
- Decided: 15 May 2026
- Citation: [2026] FCAFC 64

Case history
- Appealed from: Federal Court of Australia
- Subsequent actions: Special leave to appeal refused, High Court of Australia, 10 September 2026

Holding
- found unlawful direct discrimination instead (both by excluding Tickle and by refusing to re-admit her); special measure exemption did not permit gender identity discrimination

Court membership
- Judges sitting: Perry, Abraham, Kennett

Case opinions
- Decision by: Perry

Tickle v Giggle was a gender identity discrimination claim brought under the Australian Sex Discrimination Act 1984, subsequently appealed to the Full Court of the Federal Court of Australia.

Giggle for Girls was a social media app for women. Its membership policy excluded trans women, and on that basis Roxanne Tickle, a transgender woman from New South Wales was removed from the app. Tickle sued Giggle in 2022. In August 2024, the Federal Court of Australia found at first instance that she had been discriminated against indirectly (that is, through a rule that applied to everyone but that placed her at a disadvantage) and ordered Giggle and Grover to pay her damages and cover the costs of the case.

It was the first case to test the parts of that Act which protect people against gender identity discrimination, protections that had been added in 2013.

Both Tickle and Giggle's chief executive, Sall Grover, appealed. The appellate court heard the appeals in Sydney from 4 to 6 August 2025 and delivered its decision on 15 May 2026. The court dismissed Grover's appeal and allowed Tickle's cross-appeal: it set aside the first instance judge's declaration of indirect discrimination and substituted a declaration that Giggle and Grover had unlawfully directly discriminated against Tickle in two respects (by excluding her from the app and by refusing to re-admit her) and increased the damages to A$20,000. Grover sought leave from the High Court of Australia for a further appeal, but it was refused.

== Background ==
=== Factual background ===
In 2020, Sall Grover founded Giggle for Girls, a mobile app designed as a social networking platform for women that excluded trans women. The name, Giggle, is described as a collective noun for women, with the app presented as catering to women on the basis of sex assigned at birth, offering a safe online space for them to connect and find support in various areas such as finding roommates, freelancing, emotional support, and activism. Grover has said she was driven to develop a digital platform for women by her desire to guard against the advances of predatory men, a view that was informed by her experience with misogyny and sexual violence.

Although originally allowing transgender women, Grover later changed the app's membership policies to restrict access to adults assigned female at birth. To screen out prospective users who did not appear female, it relied on technology developed by Kairos, a company that offers facial recognition software, which performed "gender detection" on the selfie each user submitted at sign-up. According to evidence Grover gave at trial, the software was deliberately set below its maximum reliability so as to err towards admitting users who identified as women; photographs it accepted could nonetheless be examined afterwards by a Giggle staff member, who could reach a different conclusion and revoke a user's access, and a substantial number of users initially admitted by the software were later removed in this way.

By 2021, the app reportedly had 20,000 users from 88 countries.

Roxanne Tickle is recognised, by an updated Queensland birth certificate, as being of the female sex. She downloaded the Giggle App in about February 2021 and was granted access after the software accepted her registration selfie, using it until around September 2021, when she found her access limited and received a "User Blocked" message. The court found it most likely that she had been removed not by the software but through a later human review of accepted registrations, probably carried out by Grover herself, rather than by being singled out.

=== Impact ===
The app was particularly criticised for excluding transgender women. In response to criticism, Grover said that the exclusion of trans women was intentional, began self-identifying as a trans-exclusionary radical feminist, and referred to trans women as "males".

The app's facial recognition software was also criticised by Giggle users for failing to identify women of colour as female.

Grover decided to shut down the app in July 2022, and it was taken offline the following month. She alleged that "due to me speaking up in defence of my own company and my own sex-based rights, I have received death threats, rape threats, general threats of violence and countless instances of misogynistic abuse."

== Proceedings ==
The proceedings unfolded in phases and before more than one court. After conciliation at the Australian Human Rights Commission (AHRC) was unsuccessful, Tickle brought and then discontinued an initial claim in the Federal Circuit Court in 2022, before recommencing the action in the Federal Court of Australia, which heard the matter at trial in 2024.

=== Preliminary ===
In January 2022, Roxanne Tickle, a transgender woman from New South Wales who was denied membership of the app, brought a complaint to the AHRC. The AHRC offered conciliation between the parties, but the respondents declined to take part and the complaint was terminated in April 2022 on the ground that there was no reasonable prospect of the matter being settled, a step that entitled her to bring proceedings in a court within 60 days. Tickle filed her first proceeding in the Federal Circuit Court in June 2022, but discontinued it the following month, out of concern that she would be unable to meet an adverse costs order if her claim did not succeed.

Tickle recommenced the action, this time in the Federal Court, in December 2022, and was granted $50,000 from Grata Fund, a not-for-profit legal fund associated with the University of New South Wales, to help cover the costs of the case. Because the AHRC's termination notice had issued in April 2022, the fresh proceeding fell outside the 60-day period allowed under the Australian Human Rights Commission Act 1986 for bringing such a claim, and the respondents (represented by Katherine Deves) filed a notice of objection to competency arguing that the case had been commenced out of time. On 1 June 2023, Bromwich dismissed the objection and granted Tickle an extension of time so that the proceeding could continue; he also dismissed the respondents' separate application for security for costs.

The AHRC participated in the case by sending representatives to the court, including Anna Cody, the Sex Discrimination Commissioner. The commission took the role of a friend of the court and offered submissions on points of law; while the Commission sought earlier conciliation between the parties, it declined to offer submissions regarding the facts. Reem Alsalem, the United Nations Special Rapporteur on Violence Against Women and Girls, sought to intervene in the case in March 2024 but was refused on the ground that her submission was made too late; she was instead asked to submit her opinion to the Australian Human Rights Commission to inform its own submission. Consistent with the position advanced by Giggle, Alsalem's paper argued that the definition of "woman" in international human rights treaties, particularly the Convention on the Elimination of All Forms of Discrimination Against Women (CEDAW), refers to individuals assigned female at birth and that sex and sex-based discrimination in that context is understood as a biological category.

=== Trial ===
The hearing began before Justice Robert Bromwich in April 2024, with Giggle and Grover represented by Bridie Nolan. The court was required to examine the application of the Australian government's 2013 amendments to the 1984 Sex Discrimination Act, which relate to gender identity and had not been tested in court prior to this case. The hearing concluded after several days of arguments.

The essential facts of what had taken place were largely not in dispute, and the evidence at the hearing centred on the documentary record together with the affidavit and oral evidence of Tickle and Grover. Tickle gave evidence about her transition and her use of the app; her account was largely uncontradicted and was accepted by the court.

Grover gave affidavit evidence and was cross-examined. She described conceiving the app as an online "women-only safe space". In cross-examination she maintained that she regarded Tickle as a "biological male", declined to accept that a person assigned male at birth who had transitioned socially, medically and legally was a woman, and described such people as "male people".

The respondents also led further evidence in support of their defence. On the meaning of "woman" in the SDA, they provided three documents described as expert reports, prepared by Colin Wright, Kathleen Stock, and Helen Joyce. Wright's and Stock's reports were admitted as expert evidence without objection, but Joyce's report was not accepted as expert evidence. None of the three authors gave oral evidence. Bromwich held that none of the reports assisted the respondents, because the case turned on gender identity discrimination and the legal meaning of "sex", rather than the issues the reports addressed. In support of their contention that the app was a "special measure" under section 7D of the SDA, the respondents read a further 14 affidavits from app users and others attesting to the importance of "female-only spaces", and most of them made clear they meant spaces limited to those of female sex at birth. None of these witnesses gave oral evidence.

=== Arguments ===
The central question the court was expected to determine was whether the social networking app could be considered a special measure to advance women's equality under the Sex Discrimination Act, where the exclusion of men is permitted under law. Grover also raised two constitutional challenges: that section 22 of the Sex Discrimination Act was outside the scope of Commonwealth authority, and that there was an inconsistency between the Births, Deaths and Marriages Act 1994 (Qld) and the SDA.

=== First instance judgment ===
On 23 August 2024, Bromwich handed down his verdict, finding that Tickle had been indirectly discriminated against under the Sex Discrimination Act. The court ordered Giggle and Grover to pay A$10,000 to Tickle in damages, plus legal costs.

In discussing his reasoning, Bromwich rejected Grover's argument that sex was unchangeable, finding that the 2013 amendments "point forcefully to an understanding of sex, as it is deployed in the SDA, that is changeable and not necessarily binary, contrary to the respondents' submissions", and that "in its contemporary ordinary meaning, sex is changeable". He also rejected the contention that sex is confined to a "biological" category, finding that "The word sex was, and remains, undefined in the SDA.", "sex is not confined to being a biological concept referring to whether a person at birth had male or female physical traits, nor confined to being a binary concept, limited to the male or female sex, but rather takes a broader ordinary meaning, informed by its use, including in State and Territory legislation.", and "for the purposes of the SDA, the determination of the sex of a person may take into account a range of factors, including biological and physical characteristics, legal recognition and how they present themselves and are recognised socially".

Regarding the treatment of Giggle as a "special measure", Bromwich found that "even if the Giggle App could have been considered a special measure to achieve equality between men and women, that would not have allowed the respondents to discriminate on the basis of gender identity, which is distinct from discrimination against women on the basis of sex under the SDA. The respondents' argument therefore conflicted both with longstanding law as to how sex should be understood in the SDA, and the gender identity provisions of the SDA".

Bromwich found that Grover had behaved in an "offensive and belittling way" towards Tickle whilst in court by laughing at a caricature of Tickle. He also rejected both of the constitutional challenges raised by Grover. On the first, he found that "section 22 is supported by the Commonwealth's external affairs power, as an enactment of Article 26 of the International Covenant on Civil and Political Rights (1966)", specifically as it states "the law shall prohibit any discrimination and guarantee to all persons equal and effective protection against discrimination on any ground such as race, colour, sex, language, religion, political or other opinion, national or social origin, property, birth or other status"; Bromwich considered "other status" to encompass gender identity. On the second, he found that there was no inconsistency between the two statutes, which "can and do operate harmoniously". Bromwich also stated in his judgement that Grover and her legal team had presented their case in a "disjointed and somewhat incoherent way".

== Appeal ==
In October 2024, Grover launched an appeal against the judgement. The anti-LGBTQ and anti-abortion non-profit Alliance Defending Freedom donated $15,000 to Grover to support her appeal.

Proceedings began in the Federal Court on 4 August 2025. Giggle's legal team was led by Noel Hutley SC, and Tickle's team by Georgina Costello KC. The Sex Discrimination Commissioner Anna Cody was granted leave to appear as amicus curiae, and Equality Australia and the Lesbian Action Group were granted leave to intervene.

On 15 May 2026, the Full Court of the Federal Court dismissed Grover's appeal and allowed Tickle's cross-appeal. The court set aside the primary judge's declaration of indirect discrimination and instead found two acts of direct discrimination against Tickle under the Sex Discrimination Act 1984 (direct and indirect discrimination being mutually exclusive), ordering the appellants to pay $20,000 in damages. On 10 September 2026, the High Court of Australia refused special leave for Giggle to appeal from the Full Court of the Federal Court's May judgment.

== Response ==
Following the appeal decision on 15 May 2026, multiple prominent conservative politicians expressed a strong desire to rewrite the Sex Discrimination Act to make the definition of sex be only based on sex at birth. Opposition Leader Angus Taylor said it would be a "first-term priority" should his party form government. One Nation's Pauline Hanson also vowed to try to remove protections for gender identity from the Sex Discrimination Act.

New South Wales Premier Chris Minns said that biological sex differences should be "reflected in the law". He went on to state that, "if you're born biologically male and you change your government certificates to be female, it will not mean that you can change from a male prison to a female prison." These comments drew backlash from LGBTQ organizations and members of other political parties. NSW Greens MP Amanda Cohn stated the comment was a "harmful capitulation to right-wing culture wars".

Tasmanian Premier Jeremy Rockliff, Equality Tasmania, and the Australian Human Rights Commission expressed support for the ruling.

== See also ==
- For Women Scotland Ltd v The Scottish Ministers, which considered the meaning of "woman" for the sex-based provisions of the British Equality Act 2010
