= John Bloomfield (academic) =

Australian sport academic (1932–2022)

John Bloomfield AO
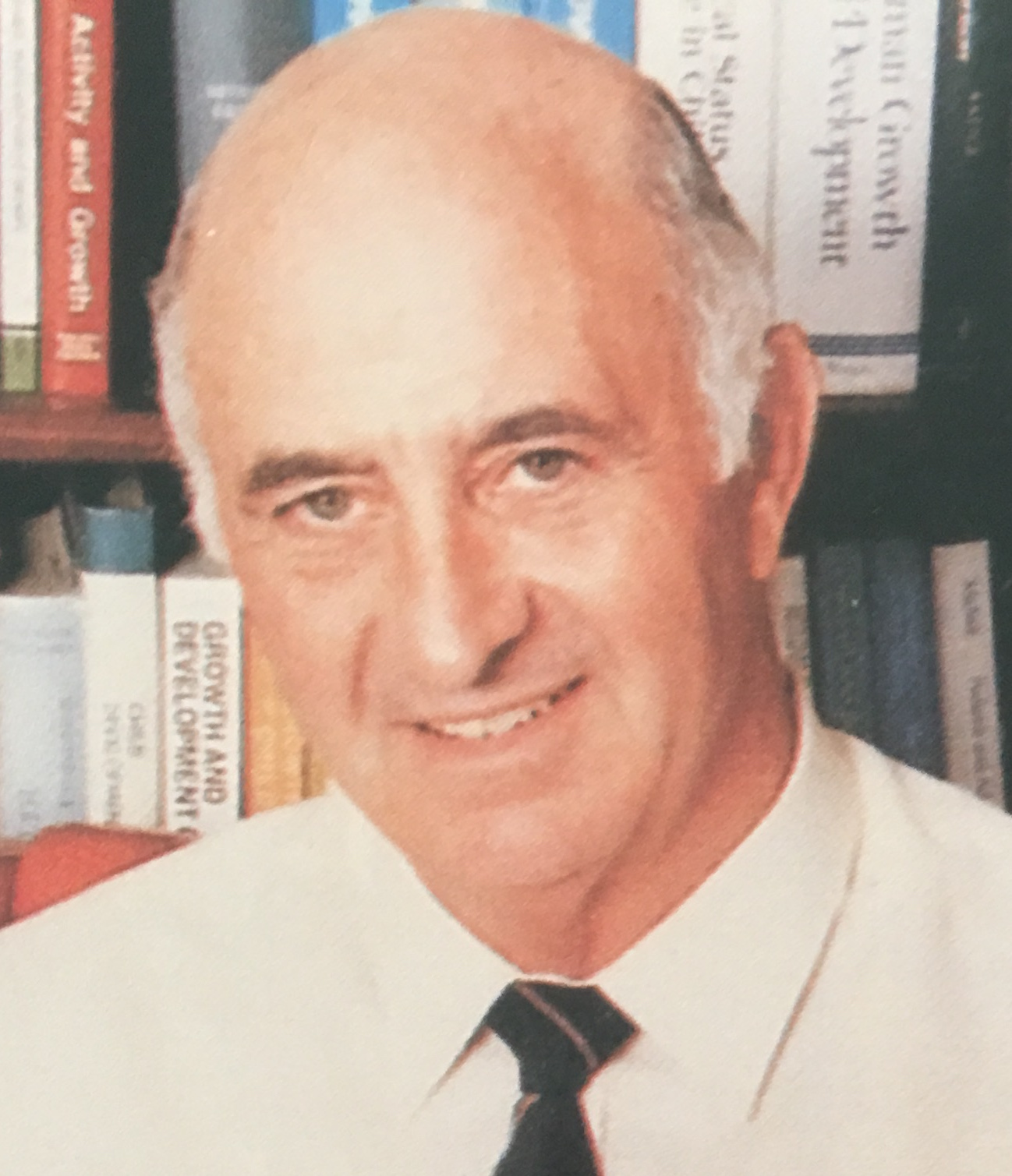
- Bloomfield in 1982
- Born: 12 December 1932; Mittagong, New South Wales, Australia
- Died: 1 October 2022 (aged 89)
- Education: Sydney Teachers' College; University of Oregon
- Spouse: Noelene Bloomfield (nee Watt)
- Awards: Member of the Order of Australia (1982); Officer of the Order of Australia (2020)
- Scientific career
- Fields: Sport science, Exercise physiology, Sport in Australia
- Workplaces: University of Western Australia

John Bloomfield AO (12 December 1932 – 1 October 2022) was an Australian sport and sport science academic and author. Bloomfield played a crucial role in the development of the Australian high performance sport system between 1973 and 1989, particularly in relation to the Australian Institute of Sport and the Australian Sports Commission. While active in the above, he lectured and conducted research at the University of Western Australia and, from time to time, in North America and Eastern and Western Europe.

== Personal ==
Bloomfield was born on 12 December 1932. In 1959, he married Noelene Watt and they have two sons - Ken and Alan and one daughter - Leigh. He grew up in the Kiama, New South Wales due to his father moving there in 1939 as the headmaster of Kiama Central School. He attended Wollongong High School, then Sydney Teachers' College and later University of Oregon.

== University ==
Bloomfield left Australia in 1960 on a Fulbright Scholarship to undertake post graduate studies at the University of Oregon. In 1967, he was awarded a PhD at the University of Oregon and was appointed to The University of Western Australia(UWA) in 1968 to head up its new Physical Education program. In 1974, he became the Foundation Professor in the then Department of Human Movement, becoming Australia's first professor to specialize in sport and exercise science. As a result of his experience, Bloomfield has advised ten Australian universities in regard to establishing similar degree courses. In 1997, he was made Emeritus Professor at the University of Western Australia and between 2001-2008 he was Honorary Professor at the University of Notre Dame at Freemantle. Bloomfield has authored or co-authored over 100 national or international scientific papers and book chapters and is the author of several major books and reports on sport.

== Sport ==
Bloomfield grew up in Kiama, New South Wales and became a successful surf life saver. In 1951/1952, he won the branch, state and Australian Junior Belt Championship and represented Australia several times in the 1950s. He won the Belt Race at The Royal International Carnival in 1954 at Bondi, New South Wales; and in 1956 he won a silver medal in the Surf Race at the International and Australian Surf Championship Carnival, Torquay, Victoria> The carnival was a display event held during the 1956 Melbourne Olympic Games. He wrote a book titled Know How to Surf.

In 1972 the Whitlam Government commissioned him to prepare a White Paper on the development of sport in Australia and this became extremely influential in the establishment of the Australian Institute of Sport (AIS) in Canberra in 1981. The white paper titled Role and scope and development of recreation in Australia. He prepared two reports that lead to the establishment of the Western Australian Department of Sport and Western Australian Institute of Sport.

In 1980, he was appointed deputy chairman of the newly established Australian Institute of Sport and in 1985 replaced Kevan Gosper as chairman, a position which he held until 1989. Whilst chairman, he was involved in managing the merger of the AIS with the Australian Sports Commission (ASC) and responding to the allegations of the Senate inquiry into drugs in sport. He was co-chairman of the ASC with Ted Harris during the merger period 1987 and 1989. In 2003, he authored the book Australia's Sporting Success: The Inside Story, the first publication to document the development high performance sport in Australia.

Between 1971 and 1973, Bloomfield was president of the Australian Sports Medicine Federation (now Sports Medicine Australia). He was chairman of the Western Australian Institute of Sport Advisory Board (1980–1982), Western Australian Sports Centre Trust (1986–1989) and Australian Sports Science Council (1983–1986). In 1986, he became Chairman of the Committee responsible for setting up the then Perth Superdrome, in 2018 known as HBF Stadium.

== Publications ==
Bloomfield has authored several significant books and reports on sport.

- 1959: Know How in the Surf : Sydney, Angus and Robertson
- 1973: Role and scope and development of recreation in Australia Canberra: Department of Tourism
- 1978: The development of sport in Western Australia : Perth, Community Recreation Council of Western Australia
- 1992: Textbook of science and medicine in sport : Melbourne, Blackwell Scientific (with Peter Fricker and Ken Fitch) (2nd ed 1995)
- 1993: Athletics Growth and Development in Children Langhorne, Pa. Hardwood Academic (with Brian Blanksby et al.)
- 1994: Applied Anatomy and Biomechanics in Sport : Melbourne, Blackwell Scientific (with Bruce Elliot and Tim Ackland) (2nd ed 2009)
- 2003: Australia's Sporting Success: The Inside Story : Sydney, Uni NSW Press
- 2012: From Ugly Duckling to Soaring Swan: The Story of Sport Science at the University of Western Australia, Perth, Round House Press

== Recognition ==
- Fulbright Scholarship, U.S.A., 1960–64
- Foreign Student Scholarship, University of Oregon, USA, 1960–64
- Western Australian Citizen of the Year Award, (CitWA) 1979
- Foundation Fellow, Australian College of Health, Physical Education and Recreation, (ACHPER) 1982
- Member of the Order of Australia (AM) 1982
- Foundation Fellow, Sports Medicine Australia (FSMA) 1984
- Fellow, Royal Society of Biology, UK, 1985. Awarded Life Fellowship (FRSB), 2004
- Fellow, Australian Institute of Biology, (FIA.Biol.) 1987
- The John Bloomfield Lecture Theatre, HBF Stadium 1986-
- Inaugural Life Member, Western Australian Sports Centre (HBF Stadium), 1989-
- Award of Merit, Western Australian Sports Federation, 1989
- Life Member, Australian Institute of Sport, 1989-
- Life Member, Australian Council for Health, Physical Education and Recreation, 1991-
- Honorary Doctorate of the University, Queensland University of Technology, (Hon DUniv) 2002
- Foundation Fellow, Australian Association for Exercise and Sports Science (FAAESS) 2002
- John Graham Award, Outstanding service to sport and recreation in WA, Government of Western Australia, 2003
- Centenary of Federation Medal, 1901–2001, for contribution made to Australian society, 2003
- Honorary Doctorate of Science of The University of Western Australia (Hon.DSc) 2005
- Award of Excellence, Surf Lifesaving Australia, 2006
- Member, Sport Australia Hall of Fame, 2007-
- The John Bloomfield Sports Science Laboratory Building, The University of Notre Dame Australia (Fremantle), 2008
- The John Bloomfield Lecture Theatre (with portrait) School of Human Sciences, The University of Western Australia, 2008
- Induction into the National Sports Museum, Melbourne, 2008
- Induction into Kiama Sports Honour Roll, 2014-
- Officer of the Order of Australia, 2020
