= Carolyn Broderick =

Australian sport and exercise medicine physician (born 1965)

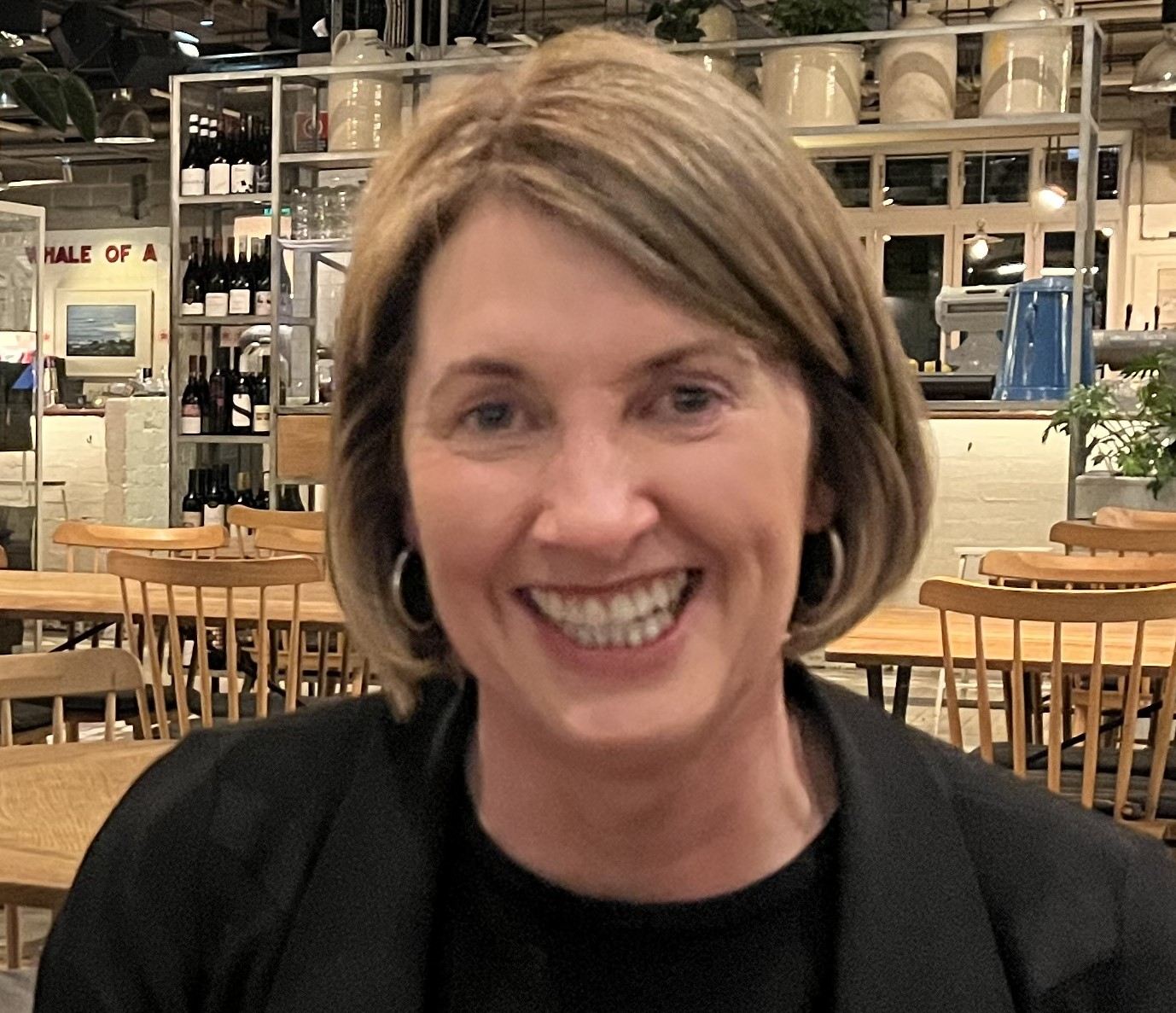
- Broderick in 2023
- Born: 1965 (age 60–61); Sydney, Australia
- Education: University of Sydney; University of New South Wales
- Known for: Australian Open extreme heat policy
- Relatives: Elizabeth Broderick
- Medical career
- Profession: Sports and exercise physician
- Institutions: Australian Olympic team Australian Open tennis tournament
- Research: Health issues in youth sports

Carolyn Broderick is an Australian sport and exercise physician, who was the first female Australian Medical Director for an Australian Olympic team, and the Chief Medical Officer for Tennis Australia.

== Early life ==
Broderick grew up in Caringbah, New South Wales, the daughter of a doctor and physiotherapist, Frank and Margot. She has twin older sisters, Elizabeth Broderick, a lawyer and former Australian Sex Discrimination Commissioner Jane Latimer.

Broderick undertook a Bachelor of Medicine, Bachelor of Surgery at the University of New South Wales and holds a PhD from University of Sydney.

== Career ==
Broderick has held an academic position at the University of New South Wales (Associate Professor) since 1994 and has published over 70 papers, including being a co-author on the Lancet series on Heat and Health. Research themes include developing evidence-based guidelines for physical activity in children. She co-authored the guidelines for return to sport in a COVID environment in 2020. She is a member of Australian Sports Drug Medical Advisory Panel and the National Sports Tribunal.

Broderick has been a staff specialist at The Children's Hospital at Westmead since 2002, one of two sport and exercise medicine physicians to hold a staff specialist position at an Australian public hospital.

Broderick was appointed as the Chief Medical Officer for the Australian Olympic Team for the 2024 Paris Olympics, becoming the first female physician to be the medical lead for the Australian Olympic team.

=== Controversies ===
The Australian Open – along with the US Open – are regularly subject to extreme heat conditions, and at times players and commentators are critical of decisions to continue play. Along with researcher Ollie Jay, Broderick has implemented evidence-based heat guidelines in recent years (Australian Open extreme heat policy) which provide objective decision-making about when to cease play.

In 2022, the Australian Open was the centre of a major controversy involving reigning champion Novak Djokovic, who was taken into quarantine and ultimately forbidden from entering Australian during the coronavirus pandemic for being unvaccinated. Tennis Australia had granted Djokovic a vaccine exemption for participation in the tournament, despite being unvaccinated, due to an expert panel of 3 independent specialists assessing that he met the criteria.
