= Ollie Jay =

Australian heat researcher (born 1975)

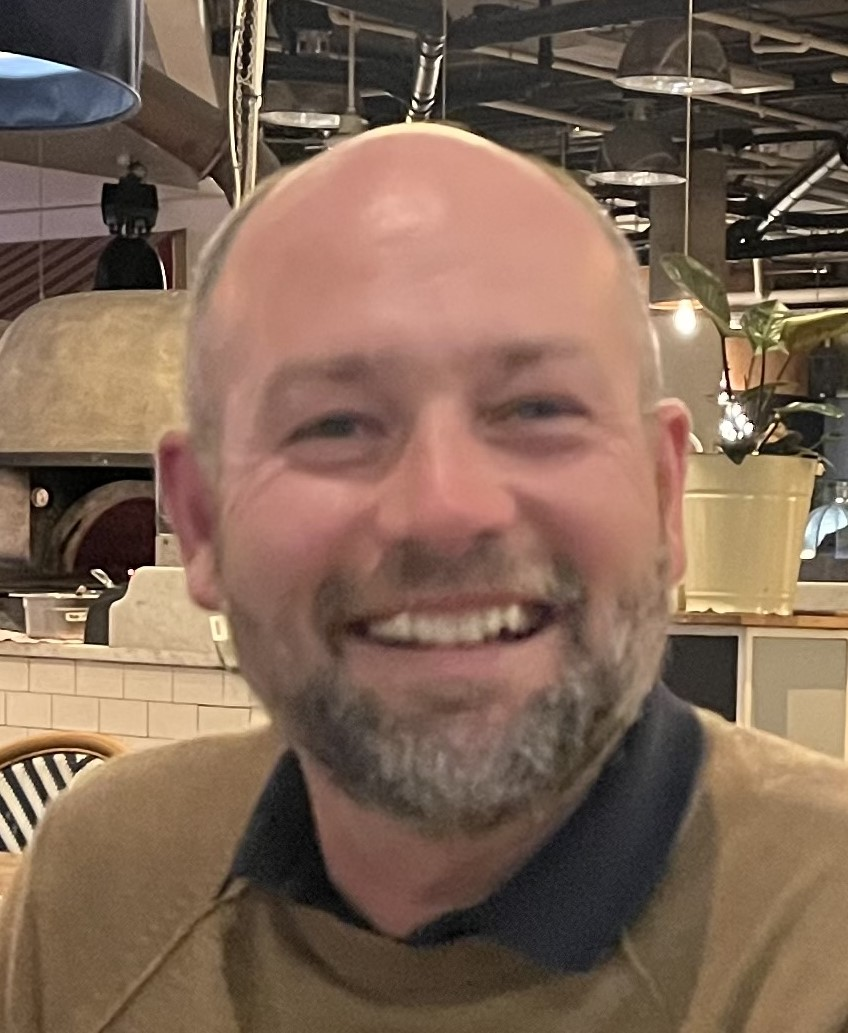
- Jay in 2023
- Born: 1975
- Education: Loughborough University
- Occupations: Professor of Heat and Health
- Known for: Director of the Thermal Ergonomics Laboratory within the Sydney Heat and Health Research Centre
- Medical career
- Profession: Academic
- Institutions: University of Sydney
- Research: Exercise in the Heat
- Awards: Vice-Chancellor's Award for Excellence: Outstanding Research and Teaching (2017)

Ollie Jay is an Australian-Welsh academic based at the University of Sydney who is a researcher into exercise and working in hot conditions.

== Career ==
Jay was the co-lead of a Lancet special series on exercise in the Heat, along with Kristie Ebi, which also provides annual updates, in conjunction with the Medical Journal of Australia. He also has led guidelines into safe exercise in pregnancy in the heat. Funding for Jay's research has come from the NHMRC and Wellcome Trust amongst other sources. He has consulted for Google adding health tips when the user is in conditions of extreme heat, along with App development for heat warnings. He was shortlisted for the Celestino Eureka Prize for Promoting Understanding of Science at the 2026 Eureka Prizes.

== Sporting body policies ==
Jay has consulted with multiple national and international sporting organizations to assist with their policies and procedures on heat stress in athletes. He is a consultant to the Korey Stringer Institute and member of the Management Committee of the Global Heat Health Information Network (a venture of multiple bodies including the World Health Organization and World Meteorological Organization).

=== Extreme heat policy at the Australian Open ===
Major tennis tournaments (particularly the Australian Open and US Open), played in summer, have a long history of players struggling to perform when conditions become extreme. This is thought to be getting worse due to global warming. The Australian Open, through Professor Jay's unit at the University of Sydney, has developed a metric to measure heat stress (based on temperature, humidity and sunlight amongst other factors) which now guides the closing of the roof, suspension of play and additional breaks in play.

=== Other sporting bodies ===
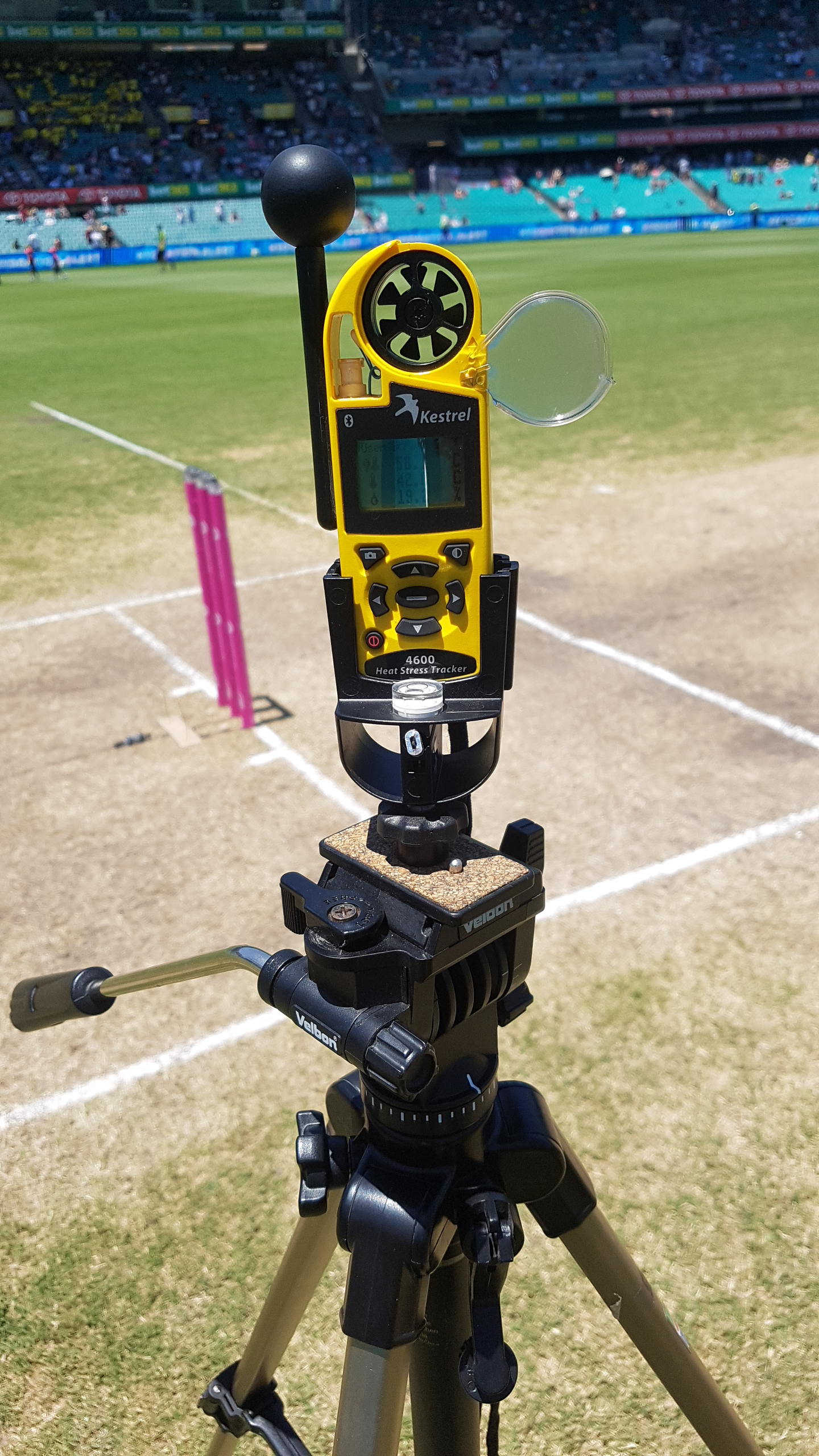
Measuring heat conditions at the SCG in January 2018

Jay has also consulted with other sports, including Cricket Australia, the National Rugby League, the Australian Institute of Sport and Sports Medicine Australia to develop their heat policies, which similarly provide objective data by which to measure heat stress on players and justify decisions for suspension of play or additional drinks breaks. He is being retained by the Australian Olympic team as an expert heat consultant for the 2024 Paris Olympics. He was also an author on the IOC position statement on Exercise in the Heat.
