= Anna Cody =

Australian human rights lawyer and sex discrimination commissioner

Sex Discrimination Commissioner of the Australian Human Rights Commission
- Incumbent
- Assumed office September 2023
- Preceded by: Kate Jenkins

Personal details
- Born: Australia
- Occupation: Human rights lawyer; academic

Anna Cody is an Australian human rights lawyer, academic, and human rights commissioner. She was a professor and Dean of the School of Law at Western Sydney University before becoming the Sex Discrimination Commissioner at the Australian Human Rights Commission commencing in 2023.

== Education ==
Cody has a PhD in Law from the University of New South Wales, a Master's in Law from Harvard University and a Bachelor of Arts and Law from UNSW.

== Career ==
Cody has worked in human rights law both in Australia and internationally, engaging in human rights advocacy in Mexico, development work in East Timor and Indonesia, and developing the health program at Manhattan's Center for Economic and Social Rights.

From 2019 to 2023, Cody was the Dean of the School of Law at Western Sydney University where she championed equity, diversity, and indigenous perspectives and support for first nations students in teaching, learning and research within the school.

In July 2023, Cody was appointed by the Federal Attorney-General as the Sex Discrimination Commissioner at the Australian Human Rights Commission. In commencing the role she highlighted First Nations and culturally and linguistically diverse women and girls as a key focus. Cody has overseen the Speaking From Experience and Equal Identities reports.
