= Korey Stringer =

American football player (1974–2001)

- Stringer on July 30, 2001, 2 days before his death

No. 77
- Position: Offensive tackle

Personal information
- Born: May 8, 1974; Warren, Ohio, U.S.
- Died: August 1, 2001 (aged 27); Mankato, Minnesota, U.S.
- Listed height: 6 ft 4 in (1.93 m)
- Listed weight: 346 lb (157 kg)

Career information
- High school: Warren G. Harding (Warren)
- College: Ohio State (1992–1994)
- NFL draft: 1995: 1st round, 24th overall pick

Career history
- Minnesota Vikings (1995–2000)

Awards and highlights
- Pro Bowl (2000); Minnesota Vikings Ring of Honor; Minnesota Vikings No. 77 retired; Consensus All-American (1994); First-team All-American (1993); 2× Big Ten Offensive Lineman of the Year (1993, 1994); Big Ten Co-Freshman of the Year (1992); 2× First-team All-Big Ten (1993, 1994); Second-team All-Big Ten (1992)

Career NFL statistics
- Games played: 93
- Games started: 91
- Fumble recoveries: 2
- Stats at Pro Football Reference

Korey Damont Stringer (May 8, 1974 – August 1, 2001) was an American professional football offensive tackle who played in the National Football League (NFL) for six seasons. He played college football for the Ohio State Buckeyes and was recognized as an All-American. He was selected in the first round of the 1995 NFL draft by the Minnesota Vikings. On August 1, 2001, Stringer died from complications brought on by heat stroke during the Vikings' training camp in Mankato, Minnesota.

== Early life ==
Stringer was born in Warren, Ohio. He attended Warren G. Harding High School in Warren, and was a member of the Harding Raiders high school football team. The Raiders won the football state championship in 1990.

== College career ==
Stringer decided to attend Ohio State University, where he played for the Ohio State Buckeyes football team from 1992 to 1994. His Buckeyes teammates included offensive tackle Orlando Pace and running backs Eddie George and Robert Smith. As a junior in 1994, he was recognized as a consensus first-team All-American.

== Professional career ==
Pre-draft measurables
Height	Weight	Arm length	Hand span
6 ft 4 1/4 in (1.94 m)	345 lb (156 kg)	33 1/4 in (0.84 m)	11 1/4 in (0.29 m)

The Minnesota Vikings drafted Stringer in the first round (24th pick overall) of the 1995 NFL draft. He played for the Vikings from 1995 to 2000. He was a standout on the offensive line, earning Pro Bowl honors in what turned out to be his final season in 2000. In six NFL seasons, he played in 93 regular season games and started 91 of them. As a professional player, Stringer was well-liked inside the locker room and out; after a Vikings game, he stopped to help a fan change a flat tire, and he impulsively signed over his Pro Bowl appearance check to a youth football program in his hometown of Warren.

== Death ==
Stringer suffered from heat stroke on the second day of the Vikings 2001 preseason training camp and died on August 1, 2001, as a result of complications. He was unable to complete the first practice session, held the morning of July 30, due to exhaustion, and did not participate in that day's afternoon session, but he vowed to return the next day to complete the morning session, which was conducted in full pads. Although he vomited three times, he did complete the morning practice session on July 31, which lasted 2 1/2 hours, but walked to an air-conditioned shelter after the session, where he became weak and dizzy. Offensive line coach Mike Tice stated that he had not witnessed Stringer vomiting, and that Stringer did not exhibit any symptoms of heat-related illness. At 11:30 am, when practice ended, the heat index had reached 99 °F; the heat index peaked later that day at 110 °F (43 °C) with a high temperature of 90 °F (32 °C).

When he was taken to Immanuel St. Joseph's–Mayo Health System hospital, his body temperature was 108 °F (42 °C) upon arrival. Stringer was unconscious from the time he was admitted until his death at 1:50 am on August 1. An autopsy confirmed that Stringer died from organ failure resulting from heat stroke.

The Minnesota Occupational Safety and Health Administration (MNOSHA) investigated Stringer's death and cleared the Vikings of responsibility on November 1, 2001. The Vice President of the Vikings, Mike Kelly, met with MNOSHA officials along with the team's athletic trainer and equipment manager. However, under the governing labor laws, the Vikings would only be held liable if it was proven they were negligent or had inflicted intentional harm. Although the autopsy confirmed that Stringer was not taking supplements, the Vikings began preparing a defense to a planned lawsuit in November 2001 by announcing that Stringer's locker was full of dietary supplements, including some that contained ephedra.

=== Legacy ===
The Vikings retired his jersey number 77 on November 19, 2001, during the halftime of a Monday night game with the New York Giants in the 2001 season.

Stringer's widow filed a wrongful death lawsuit against the team and trainers in February 2002. The athletic trainers were granted summary judgment for immunity, which was upheld on initial appeal as well as a second appeal to the Supreme Court of Minnesota. Parts of her lawsuit were later thrown out; another suit against the NFL was filed in July 2003 and settled in January 2009. The only disclosed term of the settlement is that the NFL will support efforts to create a heat illness prevention program. His widow also brought a lawsuit against Riddell Inc., the manufacturer of Stringer's pads and helmet. In July 2009, a federal judge determined that Riddell had a duty to inform Stringer that their equipment could contribute to heat injuries. A district court judge then ordered a jury trial regarding the matter.

Stringer's death brought about major changes regarding heat stroke prevention throughout the NFL. His death also addressed complications of pressuring players to "bulk up" to well over 300 pounds (140 kg). Stringer, who at the time of his death was 6 feet 4 inches (1.93 m) and weighed 335 pounds (152 kg), was at the lowest weight he had ever been in his pro career. Many professional football teams now train in light color uniforms, water and shade are made readily available, and a team doctor is at practice sessions at all times.

Stringer's wife Kelci worked to establish an exertional heat stroke prevention institute to honor her husband's legacy. On April 23, 2010, the NFL and Gatorade joined the University of Connecticut to announce the creation of the Korey Stringer Institute (KSI), a not-for-profit organization housed at the University of Connecticut and dedicated to the prevention of sudden death in sports, with a focus on exertional heat stroke (EHS). KSI stems from the 2009 settlement, with Kelci Stringer teaming with EHS expert Dr. Douglas Casa from the University of Connecticut and the NFL. The mission of the Korey Stringer Institute is to provide research, education, advocacy, and consultation to maximize performance, optimize safety, and prevent sudden death for the athlete, warfighter, and laborer.

On the 20th anniversary of his stroke, Korey's brother Kevin said "Any time there is a major change in how society does things, it's typically because somebody died or got hurt in some way, shape or form. I guess Korey's death was my family's turn to pay that cost. It bothers me sometimes if I hear of somebody having a heat-related injury, but I know even if that happens, there is more awareness of what to do. It took a while to get there, but we did."

== See also ==
- List of American football players who died during their careers
- Jordan McNair
