= Australian Sports Commission =

Australian government body

Agency overview
- Formed: 1 May 1989
- Jurisdiction: Australian Government
- Employees: ▲428
- Annual budget: ▲ A$402.1 million (2018–19)
- Minister responsible: Anika Wells, Minister for Sport
- Agency executives: Kate Jenkins, Chair; Kieren Perkins, CEO
- Parent department: Department of Health and Aged Care
- Child agency: Australian Institute of Sport
- Key document: Australian Sports Commission Act 1989
- Website: ausport.gov.au

The Australian Sports Commission (ASC) is the Australian Government commission responsible for supporting and investing in sport in Australia. The Commission incorporates the Australian Institute of Sport. From 2018 to 2022, it was known as Sport Australia.

Although it is commonly believed that the Australian Government's initial involvement in sports was prompted by the country's poor performance at the 1976 Montreal Olympic Games in which Australia failed to win a gold medal, the Government actually began initial investigations into its potential role in sports in 1973. It was at this time that the Government commissioned professor John Bloomfield to prepare a sports plan for the country. His report, "The Role, Scope and Development of Recreation in Australia", was based on studies of sports institutes in Europe and their success in developing elite athletes. Bloomfield suggested to the Government that it should establish a national institute of sport similar to those operating in European countries.

Following receipt of the report, the Minister for Tourism and Recreation, Frank Stewart, appointed a study group (chaired by Dr Allan Coles) to report on the feasibility of establishing a sports institute in Australia. The Coles Report was released in 1975 and recommended the establishment of the institute.

Although the recommendation to establish the institute was made in 1975, it was not until 1981 that the institute was established. The delay in establishing the institute is commonly considered to be a combination of poor support for Australian sport following the 1976 Montreal Olympics and the uneasiness between the Australian Olympic Federation (now the Australian Olympic Committee) and the Government. This uneasiness was caused over the Federation ignoring the Government's request to boycott the 1980 Moscow Olympic Games because of Russia's invasion of Afghanistan.

The Bloomfield and Coles reports, however, were not lost on Bob Ellicott, the Minister for Home Affairs and Environment. Buoyed by the concept of a national sports institute during a trip to China and keen to bridge the gap between government and sport, in 1980 Ellicott and his staff offered the Coles Report as a model plan for Australia. The plan would allow athletes to train and develop in Australia rather than be forced overseas. Ellicott's vision was well received and on Australia Day, 26 January 1981, the AIS was officially opened by Prime Minister Malcolm Fraser. Renowned swim coach, Don Talbot was appointed as the institute's first director. With the Institute established, the Commonwealth Government had begun its significant involvement in Australian sport.

The Australian Labor Party in its 1983 election sport policy recommended the establishment of a sports commission to provide a more co-ordinated approach to sport. In 1984, an Interim Committee report recommended its establishment. The Australian Sports Commission was formally established by the Australian Sports Commission Act 1985. In August 1987, the Australian Government formalised their decision to rationalise federal assistance to Australian sport and the Australian Institute of Sport merged with the Australian Sports Commission, which was to be the agency responsible for general sports participation as well as high performance sport.

Since its establishment, the ASC has implemented several major Australian Government sports policies:

- 1989 – Australian Sports Kit
- 1992 – Maintain the Momentum
- 1994 – Olympic Athlete Program
- 2001 – Backing Australia's Sporting Ability
- 2010 – Australian Sport: the Pathway to Success
- 2012 – Australia's Winning Edge
- 2018 – Sport 2030 – National Sport Plan
- 2019 – National High Performance Sport Strategy 2024
- 2022 – Australia's 2032+ High Performance Sport Strategy
- 2023 – Play Well: Australia’s Sport Participation Strategy
- 2024 – Sport Horizon - National Sport Strategy 2024-2034

== Administration ==
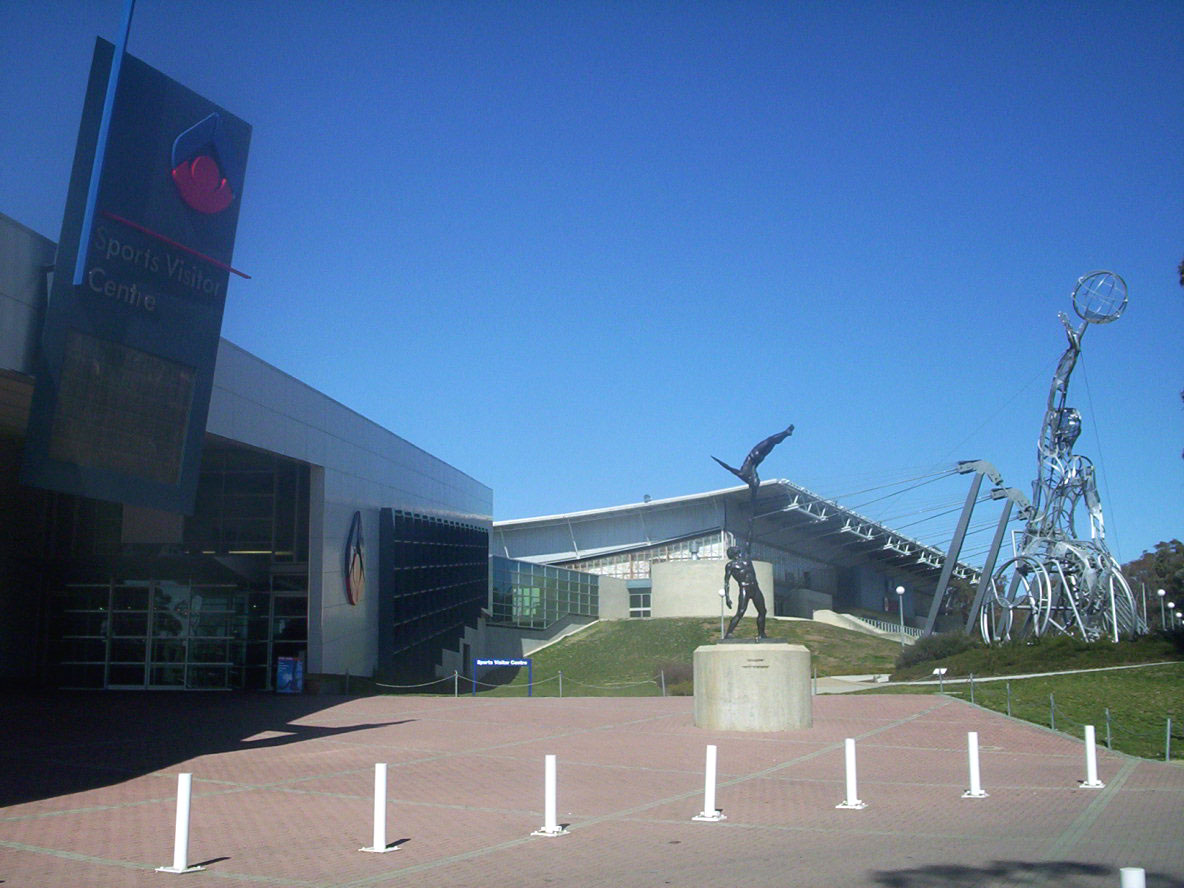
ASC is located at the AIS site in Canberra. Sports Visitor Centre on the left, AIS arena at the back right

The ASC is a statutory authority of the Australian Government, that is governed by a board of Commissioners appointed by the Minister for Sport. The ASC's roles and responsibilities are prescribed in the Australian Sports Commission Act 1989.

The ASC attempts to promote an effective national sports system that offers improved participation in quality sports by all Australians. In addition, the ASC helps those who are talented and motivated to reach their potential excellence in sports performance. The ASC achieves these objectives by administering and funding national sporting programs on behalf of the Government and providing leadership, co-ordination and support for the sport sector.

The ASC works closely with a range of national sporting organisations, state and local governments, schools and community organisations to ensure sport is well run and accessible so that everyone can participate and enjoy the benefits. The ASC supports participation in sport, from grass roots participation to participation at the elite level.

Chairman of the ASC Board

- Ted Harris 1984–1994
- Mike Fitzpatrick 1994–1997
- Peter Bartels 1997–2008
- Greg Hartung 2008–2010
- Warwick Smith 2010–2012
- John Wylie 2012–2020
- Josephine Sukkar 2021–2024
- Kate Jenkins 2024-

Chief executive officers

- Greg Hartung 1984–1988
- Ronald Harvey 1989
- Perry Crosswhite – acting (1988–1990)
- Jim Ferguson 1990–2000
- Mark Peters 2001-2008
- Matt Miller 2009-2011
- Simon Hollingsworth 2012–2016
- Kate Palmer 2017–2020
- Kieren Perkins 2021-

== Organisational structure ==
The organisational structure of the Australian Sports Commission has changed many times since its establishment as can be seen through its annual reports. The structure has generally represented the areas of high performance sport, sports participation, sport management and corporate/commercial services. The AIS has been an elite sport flagship program of the ASC since its merger in 1989.

=== Australian Institute of Sport ===
The Australian Institute of Sport (AIS) is the best known division of the ASC. In 2011, Minister for Sport Mark Arbib announced the AIS would take responsibility for the strategic direction of high performance sport in Australia. In November 2012, the ASC released "Australia's Winning Edge 2012–2022", a high performance sport plan, which highlighted a new role for the AIS particularly in terms of developing coaches and talent identification but not directly managing national sports organisations elite athlete programs as it had done since 1981.

== See also ==
- Australian Institute of Sport
- Australian Sports Commission Media Awards
- List of Australian Ministers for Sport
