= Journal of Science and Medicine in Sport =

- Discipline: Sports medicine, sports science
- Language: English
- Edited by: Tim Meyer

Publication details
- Former names: Australian Journal of Science and Medicine in Sport
- History: 1984-present
- Publisher: Elsevier on behalf of Sports Medicine Australia
- Frequency: Monthly
- Open access: Hybrid
- Impact factor: 3.0 (2023)

Standard abbreviations
- ISO 4: J. Sci. Med. Sport

Indexing
- ISSN: 1440-2440 (print); 1878-1861 (web)
- LCCN: sn98040933
- OCLC no.: 162240279

Links
- Journal homepage; Online archive

The Journal of Science and Medicine in Sport is a monthly peer-reviewed medical journal covering sports science and sports medicine. It is published by Elsevier on behalf of Sports Medicine Australia and the editor-in-chief is Tim Meyer (Saarland University). It was established in 1984 as the Australian Journal of Science and Medicine in Sport, which was a merger of two earlier journals, the Australian Journal of Sports Medicine and Exercise Sciences and the Australian Journal of Sport Sciences.

A companion open-access journal JSAMS Plus was established in 2022, initially with the same editor-in-chief (Tim Meyer) who has now been succeeded by Jessica Orchard.

== Affiliated societies ==
The Journal of Science and Medicine in Sport is the official society journal of Sports Medicine Australia, which joins medical professionals working in the sports medicine field and allied health professionals working in sports medicine or sports science. Other affiliated societies are: the Australasian Academy of Podiatric Sports Medicine, Exercise and Sports Science Australia, Australian Physiotherapy Association-Sports Physiotherapy Australia, College of Sport Psychologists, Sports Dietitians Australia, Sports Doctors Australia, and Australasian College of Sport and Exercise Physicians.

== Abstracting and indexing ==
The journal is abstracted and indexed in:

- CAB Abstracts
- CINAHL
- Embase
- Index Medicus/MEDLINE/PubMed
- PsycINFO
- Science Citation Index Expanded
- Scopus

According to the Journal Citation Reports, the journal has a 2023 impact factor of 3.0.
