= Kate Jenkins =

Australian human rights commissioner and sport administrator

Kate Jenkins AO
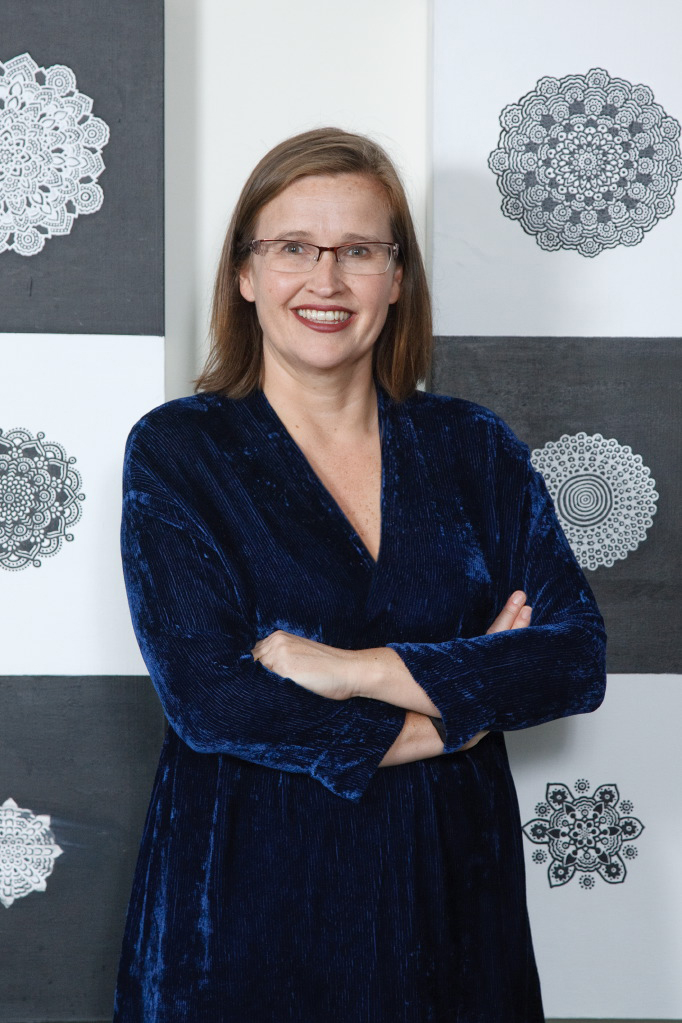
- Jenkins in 2016

Chairman of the Australian Sports Commission
- Incumbent
- Assumed office May 2024
- Preceded by: Josephine Sukkar

Sex Discrimination Commissioner of the Australian Human Rights Commission
- In office 2016–2023
- Preceded by: Elizabeth Broderick
- Succeeded by: Ross Croucher

Personal details
- Born: Kate Michelle Jenkins Australia
- Occupation: Sports administrator; business executive

Kate Michelle Jenkins AO is a human rights lawyer and commissioner and sports administrator. She was Commissioner at the Victorian Equal Opportunity and Human Rights Commission before becoming the Sex Discrimination Commissioner at the Australian Human Rights Commission from 2016 to 2023. Jenkins was appointed the chair of the Australian Sports Commission in May 2024.

== Career ==
Jenkins was the lead equal opportunity partner at Herbert Smith Freehills. There, she led the firm’s Melbourne Women in Business group for more than a decade and was the lead employment partner in the firm’s pro bono community program.

Jenkins was appointed Equal Opportunity and Human Rights Commissioner of Victoria in 2012. In April 2015 she was the convener of the Victorian Male Champions of Change, the chair of the Independent Review Into Sex Discrimination and Sexual Harassment, including predatory behaviour in Victoria Police and the co-chair of Play by the Rules. She was also the co-chair of the Commission’s Disability Reference Group and a member of the Aboriginal Justice Forum.

From 2016 until 2023 Jenkins was the Sex Discrimination Commissioner at the Australian Human Rights Commission. In January 2020, Jenkins handed to the Morrison government her Respect@Work report, the findings of a national inquiry into sexual harassment in workplaces.

In November 2021, she led a review of the Parliament House workplace culture following the 2021 Australian Parliament House sexual misconduct allegations.

=== Boards ===
In October 2015, Jenkins was appointed to the board of Carlton Football Club, where she promised to work towards creating a female team for the upcoming women's AFL competition. As of November 2015 Jenkins was on the board of Berry Street Victoria – the state's largest independent child and family welfare organisation – and a member of the boards of Heide Museum of Modern Art.

Jenkins was appointed the chair of the Australian Sports Commission in May 2024, replacing Josephine Sukkar.

In August 2024 she was appointed chair of the newly-created division of Creative Australia (formerly Australia Council), Creative Workplaces.

=== Other activities ===
In February 2015 Jenkins was a signatory to a statement by the Australian Council of Human Rights Authorities defending the independence and supporting the work of the Australian Human Rights Commission.

Jenkins was an ambassador for the 2020 ICC Women's T20 World Cup and the 2023 FIFA Women's World Cup. In 2021, she conducted the Independent Review of Gymnastics in Australia.

Since 01 July 2025, Jenkins has been the President of Australian Red Cross.

== Recognition and honours ==
In 2015 Jenkins was recognised in the Australian Financial Review and Westpac 100 Women of Influence Awards for her contribution in addressing equal opportunity and human rights issues in Victoria.

She was appointed Officer of the Order of Australia (AO) in the 2023 King's Birthday Honours for "distinguished service to human rights governance, to advancing gender equity, to the promotion of inclusivity, and to the law". In the same year she was inducted onto the Victorian Honour Roll of Women.
