= Malgosia Fitzmaurice =

Polish lawyer (born 1955)

- Born: Małgorzata Lachs; July 20, 1955 (age 71); Łódź, Poland
- Education: University of Warsaw (PhD)
- Occupations: Professor of Public International Law at Queen Mary University of London; The Nippon Foundation Professor of Marine Environmental Law at the International Maritime Law Institute
- Organization: Associate member of the Institute de Droit International
- Known for: International Law Marine Environmental Law
- Parent: Manfred Lachs
- Honours: Honorary doctorate by the University of Neuchâte, 2021

Malgosia A. Fitzmaurice (born 20 July 1955 as Małgorzata Lachs) is a Polish lawyer who is professor of public international law at Queen Mary University of London. She is an international lawyer with a specialist interest in marine environmental matters, the law of treaties, and indigenous peoples.

== Early life and education ==
Malgosia Fitzmaurice was born at Łódź, Poland on 20 July 1955 to Manfred Lachs. She studied law at the University of Warsaw, graduating in 1977. In 1980 she obtained her PhD at the same university, and became a member of the Polish Bar.

== Career ==
In 2000, Fitzmaurice was appointed to the professorship of international law at Queen Mary University of London. She became The Nippon Foundation Professor of Marine Environmental Law at the International Maritime Law Institute in October 2012. She was elected to associate membership of the Institut de Droit International in 2019. In 2021, Fitzmaurice was awarded an honorary doctorate by the University of Neuchâtel.

== Writing ==
- International Environmental Protection of the Baltic Sea (Martinus Nijhoff)
- International Protection of the Environment (RCADI 2002)
- Watercourse Cooperation in Northern Europe - A Model for the Future (with O.Elias) (TMC Asser Press 2004)
- Contemporary Issues in International Environmental Law (Edward Elgar 2009)
- Contemporary Issues in the Law of Treaties (with O. Elias) (Eleven Publishing 2005)
- The International Protection of the Environment (RCADI 2002)
- Whaling and International Law (Cambridge University Press 2015)
- Whaling in Antarctic: Significance and Implications of the ICJ Judgment (with Dai Tamada as co-editor) (Brill/Nijhoff 2016)
- Treaties in Motion: The Evolution of Treaties from Formation to Termination (with Panos Merkouris), published by Cambridge University Press in 2020.
