= Robert Hayes (legal scholar) =

Robert Alexander Hayes (12 January 1942 – 10 November 2011) was an Australian Associate professor of Law at the University of Western Sydney.

After schooling at Scotch College, Melbourne, he graduated from the University of Melbourne in law and completed a PhD in defamation at Monash University in 1973. Hayes was a qualified solicitor, barrister, quasi-judicial officer, law reform commissioner, government consultant, legal publisher, and law lecturer. His international appointments included lecturing at the Law Schools of McGill, Montreal and the University of Toronto. In 1980 he became a commissioner at the Australian Law Reform Commission and rescued a stale inquiry into privacy law in time for chairman, Michael Kirby, to deliver the three-volume report in the last days of 1983. He was also in charge of an inquiry on Insurance agents, brokers and contracts.

Hayes was the foundation editor of the Australian Law Reports, was a fellow of the Australian Institute of Forensic Sciences, former president of the Mental Health Review Tribunal and founder of the UNSW Faculty of Law.

He had an extensive list of publications, his most recent was Criminal Law and Procedure in New South Wales which he co-authored with Michael Eburn, a senior lecturer at the University of New England, Australia.

Hayes was involved in numerous community services programs including the Intellectual Disability Rights Service and as Chair of the Management Committee of Charmian Clift Cottages, a residential programme for mothers with mental illness and their children.

Hayes was married with four children.
