= Anthony Meagher =

Australian judge (born 1953)

Anthony John Meagher (born 4 September 1953) is a judge of the Court of Appeal of the Supreme Court of New South Wales, the highest court in the State of New South Wales, Australia, which forms part of the Australian court hierarchy.

== Education ==
Meagher was educated at Saint Ignatius' College, Riverview. He graduated in 1976 from the University of New South Wales with a degree in Law and Commerce.

== Career ==
Meagher joined Minter Simpson in 1976 as a solicitor. He was called to the bar in 1982, and became Senior Counsel in 1995.

On 10 August 2011, Meagher was sworn in as a Judge of the Supreme Court of New South Wales and as a Judge of Appeal.

== See also ==
- NSW Court of Appeal
- UNSW Faculty of Law
