= Cyberspace Law and Policy Centre =

The Cyberspace Law and Policy Centre was a research and social justice centre at the University of New South Wales Faculty of Law in Sydney, Australia. It provided a focus for research, public interest advocacy and education on issues of law and policy arising from digital transactions in cyberspace. It ceased to operate sometime after mid-2016.

== Description ==
The founding sponsors were Baker & McKenzie, an international law firm, and its original name was the Baker & McKenzie Cyberspace Law and Policy Centre. In 2005, with Australian Research Council research project funding, the name was shortened.

The centre's work dealt with subjects like privacy and freedom of information in digital records, cloud computing and Web 2.0 issues, content regulation and the interests of young people, e-commerce, provision of government services by Internet, online bankings, Public Key Infrastructure (PKI) and the use of encryption, Internet governance, intellectual property in digital artefacts, and decision-making technologies in public administration.

Much of the centre's work concerned Australian law and policy, but there was also a focus on the development of cyberspace regulation in Asia, the fastest growing part of cyberspace's "terrestrial footprint". There was at time also increasing interest in jurisdictional and other issues created by personal and other data stored outside a person's home country in "the cloud".

The Centre collaborated with lawyers and legal researchers in a range of other firms and organisations, including as Research Associates. It also enabled experienced external researchers to visit, and students to do internships or volunteer.

== Research projects ==
Some of the centre's research projects include the following:

=== Net Filtering & Young People ===
This research project looked at Internet filtering and censorship proposals developed by recent Australian governments. It generated materials from workshops in 2008 and 2009, and an extensive references list covering those years. It involved collaboration with the UNSW Journalism and Media Research Centre.

=== Unlocking IP ===
Unlocking IP: New models for sharing and trading IP: "Unlocking IP" is a research project supported by a 2005-2009 ARC Linkage grant to a consortium led by Graham Greenleaf, contributions from industry partners, and hosted by the Cyberspace Law and Policy Centre. As well as hosting a library of publications, and events such as Unlocking IP conferences in 2004, 2006, and 2009, the project and its participants also:

- hosted the House of Commons Blog,
- co-hosted the launch of the Creative Commons licence Australian version, and the Free for Education open content licences,
- supported the work of several PhD candidates, including a development of tools to survey the extent of open content licences used online, and
- saw a number of spin-off projects, including work:
  - for Consumers International on the 2006 Copyright Act amendments legalising format-shifting (e.g. iPod) and time-shifting (e.g. TiVo) in Australia, and
  - for the Copyright Agency Ltd, on Orphan Works.

=== Interpreting Privacy Principles ===
"Interpreting Privacy Principles" was a research project led by Greenleaf subtitled "Creating more consistent privacy principles through better interpretation and law reform: an Australasian initiative to resolve an international problem - comparative research into privacy principles." It was supported by an ARC Discovery grant 2006–2009 to a research team based at the centre.

As well as a number of events, such as the symposium International perspectives on privacy regulation: Privacy Principles in Asia Pacific economies compared at UNSW on 3–4 March 2010, numerous publications and submissions such as those to the 2008 ALRC review of privacy law in Australia, the project also supported the Asia Pacific Privacy Charter, work on the APEC Privacy Framework, and the proposed but abandoned national ID card system known as the Access Card.

=== Regulating Online Investing ===
"One Day, We’ll All Invest This Way! Regulating Online Investing" is an ARC Discovery research project led by Dimity Kingsford Smith from UNSW, with collaborators from Monash and ANU. The Centre developed and hosted the project's online and offline resources, including a "Selected References" list. Despite the encouragement for individual investors to go online and trade securities, when the project started there had been limited research into the regulatory implications of the non-advisory context of their decision making. Further, outside the United States, there were no significant treatments of the regulation of electronic trading platforms. This Australian Research Council funded project addressed these deficiencies, particularly in relation to Australian online investing.

== Disestablishment ==
There is no official announcement on the website, but the website shows no activity after July 2016, and key personnel have moved on; co-convenor Lyria Bennett Moses is as of July 2019 at the Allens Hub for Technology, Law & Innovation, founded in 2018.
