= Sex Discrimination Act 1984 =

Act of the Parliament of Australia

Parliament of Australia
- Long title: An Act relating to discrimination on the ground of sex, sexual orientation, gender identity, intersex status, marital or relationship status, pregnancy, potential pregnancy, breastfeeding or family responsibilities or involving sexual harassment
- Status: In force

The Sex Discrimination Act 1984 is an Act of the Parliament of Australia which prohibits discrimination on the basis of mainly sexism, homophobia, transphobia and biphobia, but also sex, marital or relationship status, actual or potential pregnancy, sexual orientation, gender identity, intersex status or breastfeeding in a range of areas of public life. These areas include work, accommodation, education, the provision of goods, facilities and services, the activities of clubs and the administration of Commonwealth laws and programs. The Australian Human Rights Commission investigates alleged breaches of the Act. The office of Sex Discrimination Commissioner, created in 1984 alongside the Act, is a specialist commissioner within the AHRC.

This legislation was pushed and supported by the Bill put forward by South Australia's Premier, Don Dunstan in 1975.

The Act implements Australia's obligations under the Convention on the Elimination of All Forms of Discrimination Against Women which came into force in September 1981 and which Australia ratified in July 1983, subject to several reservations and declarations, the main one relating to paid maternity leave. The Act also gives effect to parts of International Labour Organization Convention 156 which concerns workers with family responsibilities.

== Provisions ==
The full scope of the Act is covered principally by Section 3B, which seeks "to eliminate, so far as is possible, discrimination against persons on the ground of sex, marital status, pregnancy or potential pregnancy in the areas of work, accommodation, education, the provision of goods, facilities and services, the disposal of land, the activities of clubs and the administration of Commonwealth laws and programs". This may include provision of public services, dismissal of employees with family responsibilities and to eliminate sexual harassment in areas of public activity. However, it equally applies to sex based discrimination on topics such as domestic violence, where there is no justification for sex differentiation for victims of violence.

The Act also seeks to create recognition and acceptance within the community of the principle of the equality of men and women.

Section 7AA of the Act prohibits discrimination against a woman on account of her breastfeeding.

Section 38 of the Act permits educational institutions established for religious purposes to discriminate, including against teachers and students, due to their sexuality or gender.

Section 43 of the Act provided the Australian Defence Force (ADF) with an exemption to allow discrimination against women "in connection with employment, engagement or appointment" involving combat duties that required a person "to commit, or to participate directly in the commission of, an act of violence against an adversary in time of war". (Note: The Act originally provided an exemption to allow discrimination against women for "combat duties" and "combat-related duties". The Sex Discrimination Amendment Act 1995 removed combat-related duties.) On 1 January 2014, the ADF lifted restrictions on women serving in all combat roles, including the special forces, and on 1 January 2016 direct entry to all combat roles became open to women. On 26 October 2018, the Civil Law and Justice Legislation Amendment Act 2018 repealed section 43 of the Act.

== Outcomes ==
As a result of the Act, the Women's Royal Australian Naval Service was integrated in 1985 into the Royal Australian Navy. Other restrictions on women in the WRANS had been eliminated previously: the restriction on married women serving was removed in 1969, and the automatic discharge of pregnant women had been dropped in 1974.

In 2018, Prime Minister Scott Morrison announced that laws would be created to protect students from expulsion from religious schools due to sexuality or gender, and later also announced a promise to protect teachers and staff. In 2019, a Senate Inquiry into Sex Discrimination Amendment Bill was held. In 2021, religious educational institutions continued to be lawfully permitted to fire or expel LGBTQ+ teachers, students, and staff due to their sexuality or gender.

== Amendments ==
=== Sex Discrimination Amendment Act 1991 ===
In 1991, the Sex Discrimination Amendment Act 1991 amended the Marriage Act 1961 to equalise the marriageable age of both males and females at 18 years, subject to "exceptional circumstances". Previously the marriageable age was set at 16 for females and 18 for males.

=== Sex Discrimination Amendment (Pregnancy and Work) Bill 2003 ===
The rights and responsibilities of pregnant and potentially pregnant workers in the workplace were clarified by the Sex Discrimination Amendment (Pregnancy and Work) Act 2003. The foundational case on this issue is Hickie v Hunt & Hunt (1998) in which the plaintiff complained of less favourable treatment in the workplace following her maternity leave.

=== Sex Discrimination Amendment (Sexual Orientation, Gender Identity and Intersex Status) Act 2013 ===
In 2013 the Sex Discrimination Amendment (Sexual Orientation, Gender Identity and Intersex Status) Act 2013 added new protections against discrimination against sexual orientation, gender identity, and intersex status, as well as providing protection against from discrimination for same-sex de facto couples. Additionally, the amendment limited aged care provider's religious exception for discrimination.

The amendments were first tested by federal courts in Tickle v Giggle.

== See also ==
- Sex discrimination
- Australian Human Rights Commission
- Sex Discrimination Commissioner
- Tickle v Giggle

== External sources ==
- Sex Discrimination Act 1984 in the Federal Register of Legislation
- Sex Discrimination Act 1984 on Austlii
