= Lachs Space Moot =

Space law moot competition organised by the International Institute of Space Law

- Established: 1993
- Venue: Varies
- Subject matter: Space law
- Class: Grand Slam
- Record participation: 92 teams (2021)
- Qualification: Memorials; national and regional rounds
- Most championships: George Washington University (3); National Law School of India University (3)
- Website: Official website

The Manfred Lachs Space Law Moot Court Competition or Lachs Space Moot is a space law moot competition organised by the International Institute of Space Law. The competition is named after Manfred Lachs, a former judge of the International Court of Justice. It is not only the oldest international student competition on space law (with the first edition of the moot taking place in 1993), but also one of the oldest international moots. As the class-leading moot in its field and given its scale, the Lachs Moot is considered one of the major or grand slam moots. In 2011, another space law moot came about, organised by the International Air & Space Law Academy. It is a different moot that is much smaller in scale, and has since become defunct.

In addition to national rounds for certain countries, five regional competitions have been held for the Lachs Moot to date—Africa (introduced in 2012), Asia Pacific, Europe, Latin America (introduced in 2021), and North America—with the winners of each region proceeding to the world or international rounds at a venue that changes every year (depending on where the International Astronautical Congress is held). At the international rounds, a preliminary round and two semi-finals are held before the world championship round, which is typically judged by three sitting ICJ judges. For a period of time, the regional and world rounds were held online due to the COVID-19 pandemic.

In each oral round of the moot there is an applicant and a respondent, and each side is represented by two counsel (any of counsel cannot be seated together with them). Each team also has to submit written memorials for both sides. These memorials are re-evaluated during the world rounds.

== Competition records (world rounds) ==
Year (venue)	Number of teams (excluding national rounds)	World champion (win number)	Runner-up (win number)	Semi-finalist(s)	Best Oralist (win number)	Best Memorials (win number)
2025 (Sydney)	75	North America: New York University (1)	Europe: University of Luxembourg (1)	* Africa: Strathmore University * Asia Pacific: Singapore Management University	University of Luxembourg (1)	University of Luxembourg (1)
2024 (Milan)	90	Asia Pacific: Singapore Management University (1)	Europe: National and Kapodistrian University of Athens (3)	* North America: McGill University * Latin America: National Autonomous University of Mexico	National and Kapodistrian University of Athens (3)	Singapore Management University (1)
2023 (Baku)	73	Asia Pacific: China University of Political Science and Law (1)	Europe: University of Cologne (1)	* Africa: University of Calabar * Latin America: National Autonomous University of Mexico	University of Cologne (1)	China University of Political Science and Law (1)
2022 (online)	81	Europe: Leiden University (3)	North America: George Washington University (2)	* Africa: Midlands State University * Asia Pacific: West Bengal National University of Juridical Sciences	George Washington University (1)	Leiden University (2)
2021 (online)	92	Europe: The Honourable Society of the Inner Temple (1)	Asia Pacific: National Law School of India University (1)	* Africa: University of Pretoria * North America:	National Law School of India University (3)	National Law School of India University (3)
2020 (online)		Asia Pacific: National Law University, Delhi (2)	Europe: University of Vienna (1)	* Africa: University of Pretoria * North America: Georgetown University	University of Vienna (1)	University of Vienna (1)
2019 (Paris)	69	Europe: University of Ljubljana (1)	Africa: University of Calabar (1)	* Asia Pacific: National University of Singapore * North America: McGill University	University of Calabar (1)	McGill University (3)
2018 (Bremen)	77	Africa: University of Pretoria (1)	Asia Pacific: Symbiosis Law School (1)	* North America: Louisiana State University * Europe: Belarusian State University	University of Pretoria (1)	Belarusian State University (1)
2017 (Adelaide)	74	Asia Pacific: National Law School of India University (3)	North America: University of Mississippi (1)	* Africa: University of Pretoria * Europe: National and Kapodistrian University of Athens	University of Mississippi (1)	National Law School of India University (2)
2016 (Guadalajara)	66	Europe: National and Kapodistrian University of Athens (1)	Africa: Obafemi Awolowo University (1)	* Asia Pacific: Curtin University * North America: McGill University	National and Kapodistrian University of Athens (2)	McGill University (2)
2015 (Jerusalem)	58	North America: University of Mississippi (1)	Europe: National and Kapodistrian University of Athens (2)	* Asia Pacific: NALSAR University of Law * Africa: Obafemi Awolowo University	National and Kapodistrian University of Athens (1)	University of Mississippi (1)
2014 (Toronto)	61	Asia Pacific: National Law University, Delhi (1)	North America: Florida State University (1)	* Africa: Obafemi Awolowo University * Europe: Paris-Sud University	National Law University, Delhi (1)	Florida State University (1)
2013 (Beijing)	60	North America: Georgetown University (2)	Europe: Leiden University (2)	* Africa: University of Pretoria * Asia Pacific: National Law University, Delhi	Georgetown University (4)	Georgetown University (2)
2012 (Naples)	54	Asia Pacific: National Law School of India University (2)	Europe: National and Kapodistrian University of Athens (1)	* Africa: Obafemi Awolowo University * North America: University of California at Davis	National Law School of India University (2)	National Law School of India University (1)
2011 (Cape Town)	44	North America: Florida State University (1)	Asia Pacific: National University of Singapore (3)	Europe: Saint Petersburg State University	National University of Singapore (3)	Obafemi Awolowo University (1)
2010 (Pilsen)	48	North America: George Washington University (3)	Asia Pacific: National University of Singapore (2)	Europe: University of Cologne	National University of Singapore (2)	National University of Singapore (2)
2009 (Daejeon)	48	Asia Pacific: National Law School of India University (1)	North America: Georgetown University (3)	Europe: University of Strathclyde	National Law School of India University (1)	Georgetown University (1)
2008 (Glasgow)	53	Asia Pacific: University of New South Wales (1)	Europe: University of Augsburg (1)	North America: Georgetown University	University of New South Wales (1)	University of Augsburg (1)
2007 (Hyderabad)	54	North America: George Washington University (2)	Asia Pacific: University of Queensland (1)	Europe: Leiden University	University of Queensland (1)	University of Queensland (1)
2006 (Valencia)	56	Asia Pacific: University of Auckland (2)	North America: McGill University	Europe: KU Leuven	McGill University (1)	McGill University (1)
2005 (Fukuoka)	47	North America: George Washington University (1)	Asia Pacific: National University of Singapore (1)	Europe: University of Cambridge	National University of Singapore (1)	National University of Singapore (1)
2004 (Vancouver)	39	Europe: Leiden University (2)	North America: Georgetown University (2)	Asia Pacific: National Law School of India University	Georgetown University (3)	Leiden University (1)
2003 (Bremen)	25	Asia Pacific: University of Auckland (1)	North America: Georgetown University (1)	Europe: University of Bremen	Georgetown University (2)	University of Bremen (1)
2002 (Houston)	23	North America: Georgetown University (1)	Asia Pacific: University of New South Wales (1)	Europe: University of Warwick	Georgetown University (1)	University of New South Wales (1)
2001 (Toulouse)		Asia Pacific: National University of Singapore (1)	North America: University of North Carolina (2)	Europe: Dijon University	University of North Carolina (3)	University of North Carolina (1)
2000 (Rio de Janeiro)		Europe: University of Paris XI (2)	North America: Hamline University (1)	Asia Pacific: National University of Singapore	Hamline University (1)	University of Paris XI (3)
1999 (The Hague)		North America: Vanderbilt University (1)	Europe: University of Paris XI (1)		Vanderbilt University (1)	University of Paris XI (2)
1998 (Melbourne)		North America: University of North Carolina (2)	Europe: University of Helsinki (2)		University of North Carolina (2)	University of Helsinki (1)
1997 (Turin)		Europe: University of Paris XI (1)	North America: University of North Carolina (1)		University of North Carolina (1)	University of Paris XI (1)
1996		Europe: University of Helsinki (1)	North America: University of Wyoming (1)			
1995		North America: University of North Carolina (1)	Europe: Leiden University (1)			
1994		North America: John Marshall University (1)	Europe: University of Helsinki (1)			
1993		Europe: Leiden University (1)	North America: George Washington University (1)			
