= Grata Fund =

Australian not for profit legal fund

Grata Fund is a not for profit legal fund based in Australia. It's Australia's first specialist non-profit strategic litigation incubator and funder. Grata develops, funds, and builds sophisticated campaign architecture around high impact, strategic litigation brought by people and communities in Australia. Grata Fund uses a movement lawyering approach, an innovative model of collaborative justice which grew out of the US civil rights movement to build the power of the people.

The organisation was founded in 2015 by Isabelle Reinecke, and is partnered with the University of New South Wales (UNSW) Faculty of Law and Justice. Among the cases supported by the group are those relating to governmental responses to climate change, freedom of information, and matters of gender identity and sex-discrimination.

In financial year 2023, Grata Fund supported 22 cases, and partnered with 6 legal teams and 30 barristers who provided pro bono legal representation and advice. 40% of these cases were led by First Nations people.

== Human Rights ==
In August 2024, Grata Fund celebrated a win in one of their longest-running cases. Grata supported the Eastern Arrernte community of Ltyentye Apurte (Santa Teresa) in the NT who fought for decent housing. They took the NT government to court in 2015 and won in the High Court of Australia in 2024.

Grata Fund has supported a number of other human rights legal cases including fighting against gag laws that penalised Australian doctors, supporting people locked in refugee detention during COVID-19, and advocating to protect children with disability in school.

Grata Fund also helped to ensure First Nations experts could give evidence in the inquest into the death of Veronica Nelson, a Yorta Yorta, Gunditjmara, Dja Dja Wurrung and Wiradjuri woman who died in January 2020, after four days in a police cell.

Grata Fund supported Yasir*, a refugee, in challenging Border Force for the harmful use of restraints on those in immigration detention.
