= Ted Harris (company director) =

Australian businessman (born 1927)

Albert Edward Harris, AC, (born 4 May 1927) is an Australian businessman, director of companies, tennis commentator and sport administrator.

== Personal ==
Harris was born on 4 May 1927. He married Vicky, Lithuanian-born, at the age of 40. They have two daughters. He attended The Scots College in Sydney where he was actively involved in sports and debating. While at Scots College, he won the Royal Empire Society Medal, a New South Wales competition for public speaking.

== Business ==
In 1946, he started work with the Macquarie Broadcasting network as a trainee. He moved to become a sport broadcaster and then the sporting editor for the network. In 1952, he was appointed assistant to managing director, Clive Ogilvy at the Network. In 1954, he joined Ampol and quickly moved up the ranks – NSW Manager in 1956, Assistant general manager in 1958, general manager in 1963, Chief general manager in 1965, managing director of Ampol Petroleum in 1970 and managing director of Ampol Exploration in 1971. He retired from Ampol in 1987 at the age of 60 as he wanted "a change of diet". After departing from Ampol, he was appointed to several boards. Boards that he was chairman included Australian Airlines (1987–1992), Australian National Industries (1992–1997), Australian Radio Network (1995–), Gazal Corporation (1989–2004), Australian Sports Commission (1984–1994), Zoological Board of New South Wales (1973–1990 including Director) and St Vincent's Clinic Foundation (2000–). Other boards that he has held directorships with include Australian Broadcasting Commission (1974–1977), Australian Institute of Petroleum (1977–1987) and Trustee Walkley Awards (1976–1987).

== Sport ==
Harris has a long involvement in sport. At Scots College, he was a member of the first X (cricket team), first XVI (rugby team) and tennis teams. At Macquarie Broadcasting, he was a sports commentator and editor. In 1946, the Dunlop Rubber Company selected him to cover the Davis Cup in Melbourne. After joining Ampol, Harris continued to commentate on international tennis tournaments. During his time at Ampol, it used sport to sell its image as "The Australian Company" by sponsoring many sporting events. His interest and commitment in sport led to him chairing the Australian Olympic Federation 1984 and 1988 Fundraising programs. In 1983, he was appointed the interim Chairman of the Australian Sports Commission and appointed chairman in 1984 when the Commission was established. Developments whilst he was at the Commission from 1984 to 1994 included the Aussie Sports Program (modified sport for children), the amalgamation the Australian Institute of Sport and the Australian Sports Commission and three major Australian Government funding injections into sport – Australian Sports Kit (1988), Maintain the Momentum (1992) and Olympic Athlete Program (1994). From 1991 to 1994, he was a member of the successful Sydney Olympics 2000 Bid Committee.

== Awards and honours ==
- 1977– Queen's Silver Jubilee Medal
- 1979 – Officer of the Order of Australia (AO) for service to the community
- 1989 – Companion of the Order of Australia (AC) for service to the community
- 2013 – Sport Australia Hall of Fame General Member
