= Manfred Lachs =

Polish diplomat and jurist (1914–1993)

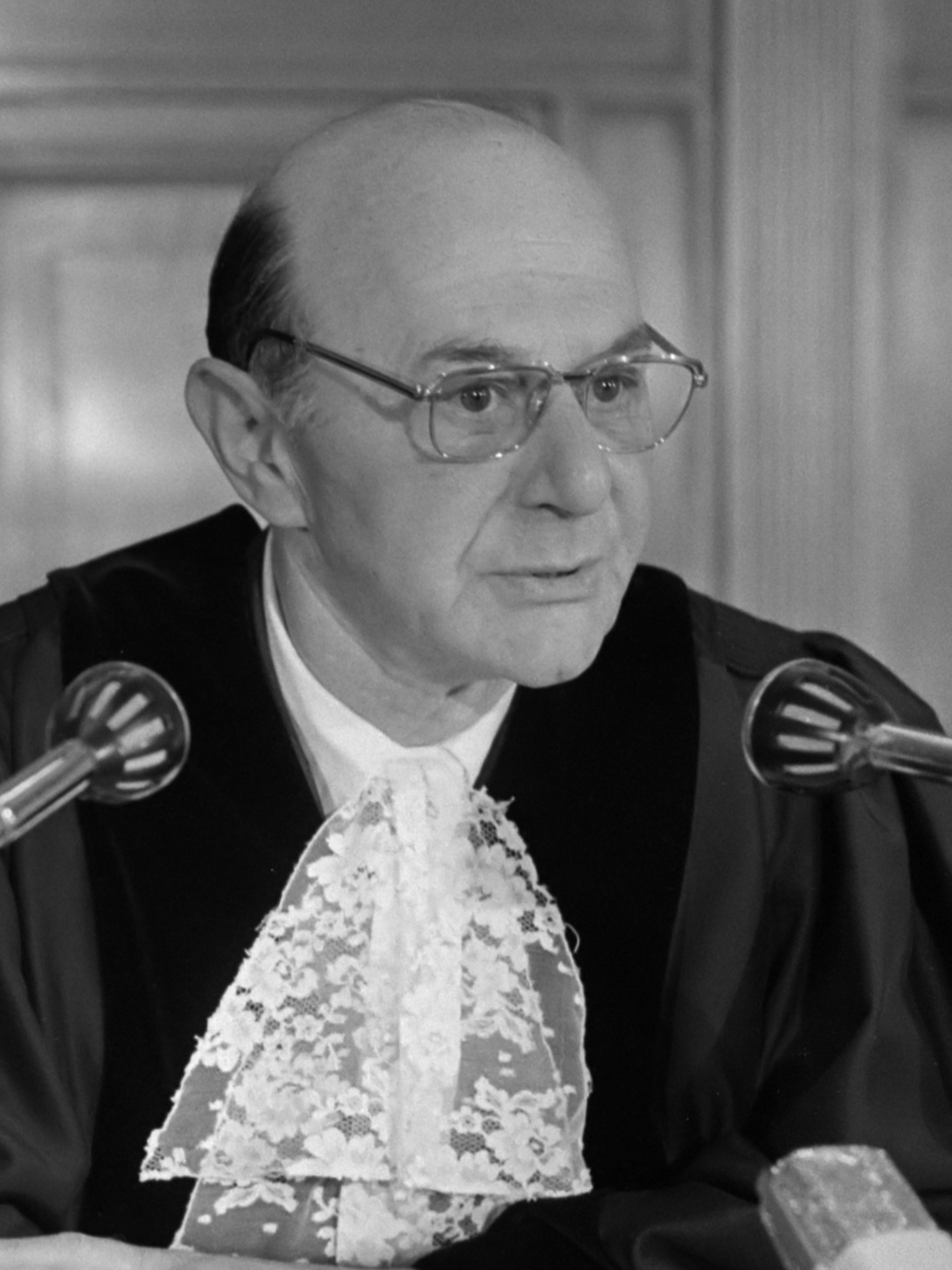
- Lachs in 1974

President of the International Court of Justice
- In office 1973–1976
- Preceded by: Muhammad Zafarullah Khan
- Succeeded by: Eduardo Jiménez de Aréchaga

Judge of the International Court of Justice
- In office 1967 – 14 January 1993
- Preceded by: Bohdan Winiarski
- Succeeded by: Géza Herczegh

Personal details
- Born: 21 April 1914 Stanisławów, Kingdom of Galicia and Lodomeria, Austria-Hungary (now Ivano-Frankivsk, Ukraine)
- Died: 14 January 1993 (aged 78) The Hague, Netherlands
- Children: Malgosia Fitzmaurice
- Education: Jagiellonian University

Manfred Lachs (21 April 1914 – 14 January 1993) was a Polish diplomat and jurist who served as a Judge of the International Court of Justice and greatly influenced the development of international law after World War II.

== Life ==
Lachs was born to a Jewish family. Lachs attended the Jagiellonian University in Kraków where he earned a doctorate in Laws (1937). Right after his studies, he started working for the Consular Academy of Vienna and afterwards in the London School of Economics. Lachs was drafted in the army and throughout his military service he was advisor to the Polish government.

During the Second World War, Lachs escaped to London, and served as secretary to Ignacy Schwarzbart, who was one of the two Jewish representatives on the National Council of the Polish government-in-exile. Lachs' family, which remained in Poland, were murdered in the Holocaust. Lachs was devoted towards ensuring the prosecution of the perpetrators of the Holocaust and of crimes in Poland.

Before his career turned toward international law, he filled many judiciary posts in the Polish government such as Poland's Foreign Affairs director of the Department of treaties and legal jurisdiction (1947–1960) and prime minister's special advisor (1960–1967). He was the first Chair of the Legal Subcommittee of the UN Committee for the Peaceful Uses of Outer Space (1959–1967). During negotiations over the Paris Peace Treaties of 1947, Lachs stood for his country as a delegate. He later became a professor of international law at the University of Warsaw (1952–1993), and served as a member of the Polish delegation of the general assembly of the United Nations. It is said that Lachs' legal brilliance is what insulated him from anti-Semitic purges in Poland.

Afterwards, Lachs became a judge on the International Court of Justice, and eventually became one of the longest-serving judges there, working from 1967 until 1993, and presiding it from 1973 to 1976. He wrote The Law of Outer Space: An Experience in Contemporary Law Making in 1972, and the Teacher in International Law in 1982.

The International Institute of Social Studies (ISS) awarded its Honorary Fellowship 1982. Member Honoris Causa of The Mexican Academy of International Law.

Father to Malgosia Fitzmaurice.

== Manfred Lachs Moot Court Competition ==
After his death, the Manfred Lachs Space Law Moot Competition was named in his honour by the International Institute of Space Law.
