= Josephine Sukkar =

Australian business executive

Josephine Louise Sukkar AM (née Macdessi) is an Australian business executive and was Chair of the Australian Sports Commission from 2021 to 2024.

== Personal ==
She was born in 1963 as Josephine Louise Macdessi. Her mother, Mary Macdessi, came to Australia from Lebanon when she was six and moved to Wingham in New South Wales, where her family ran a general store. Her father, Buddy Macdessi, was a doctor who came to Australia from Lebanon when he was eleven, took to sports, and became a rugby league supporter and Canberra Raiders team doctor. She has two sisters and grew up in the Sutherland Shire and attended Gymea Bay Public School. She obtained a Bachelor of Science (Hons) in physiology and pharmacology and a Graduate Diploma of Education (1987) from University of New South Wales. She is married to Tony Sukkar. Their daughter is a doctor and their son now works in their business, Buildcorp.

== Career ==
She taught science at Gymea High School from 1988 to 1989. She and her husband, Tony Sukkar, established Buildcorp in 1990. She is Chair of Buildcorp Foundation, which is a charitable structure concerned with initiatives such mental health and suicide prevention.

== Sport ==
She has a long involvement in rugby union as volunteer, administrator and board member. She has been president of Australian Women's Rugby since 2015 and Director of Sydney University Football Club Foundation since 2010. Her company, Buildcorp, has been a major sponsor of rugby in Australia for nearly 30 years and, in recent times, particularly women's rugby. She was co-president of YMCA NSW from 2008 to 2015. She was Chair of the Australian Sports Commission from 2021 to 2024, the first woman appointed to this position.

== Boards ==
Her membership on private, public, government and not-for-profit boards includes Growthpoint Properties Australia, Parramatta Park Trust (2017–2020), Australian Rugby Foundation (2015–2019), Australian Museum Trust (2019–), Melbourne University Infrastructure Advisory Board (2017–2020), the Sydney University Football Club Foundation, Opera Australia (2011–), Centenary Institute (2011–) and Green Building Council of Australia (2021–)

== Recognition ==
- 2017 – Member of the Order of Australia for significant service to the community through a range of roles with sporting, social welfare and cultural organisations and to the construction sector.
- 2019 – Honorary Fellow of the University of Sydney, in recognition of longstanding and continuing contribution to the University.
