= Health issues in youth sports =

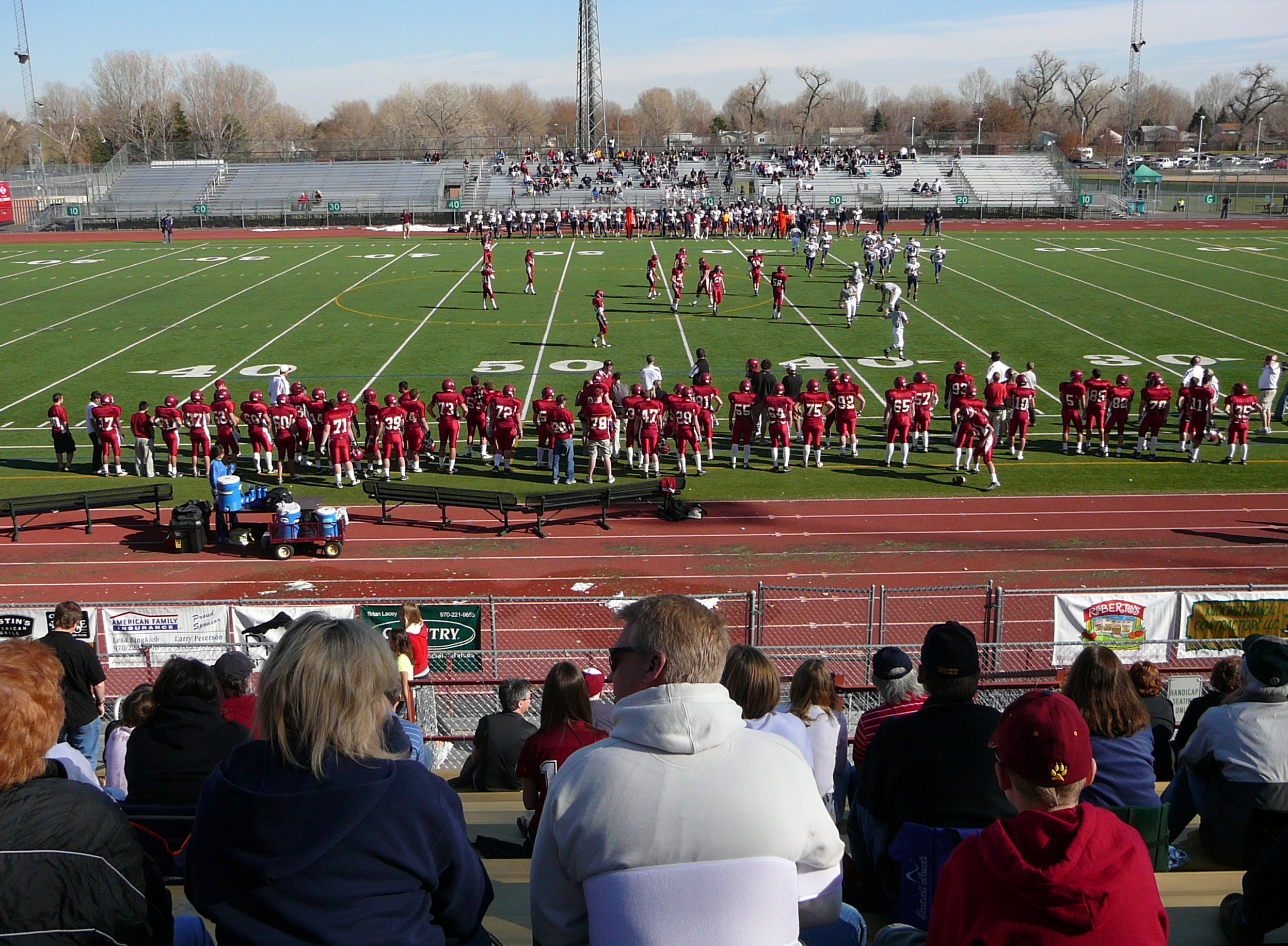
Rocky Mountain High School, football field

The health issues of youth sports are concerns regarding the health and wellbeing of young people between the ages of 6 and 18 who participate in an organized sport. Given that these athletes are physically and mentally underdeveloped, they are particularly susceptible to heat illness, eating disorders and injury; sufficiently severe conditions can result in death. Awareness and prevention are key factors in preventing many health issues in youth sports.

== Heat illness and dehydration ==
Heat illnesses are a recent concern in youth athletics. They include heat syncope, muscle cramps, heat exhaustion, heat stroke and exertional hyponatremia. Heat illness and dehydration are typically brought on by conditions of high temperatures and high humidity. These conditions carry increased risk for young athletes, particularly if at the beginning of a season when they are less fit. Other factors which increase vulnerability include: heat-retaining clothing, recent illness, previous experience with heat illness, chronic conditions, or sleep deprivation. Additional precaution is to be taken if the child is taking supplements or using cold medication.

Heat illnesses are among the primary causes of sports-related death or disability, and as such they require immediate medical attention. Symptoms to watch for are dry or sticky mouth, headache, dizziness, cramps, unusual fatigue, confusion, and loss of consciousness

== Eating disorders ==
Eating disorders are generally not a primary concern amongst youth athletes, however they are unusually prevalent in wrestling and aesthetic sports such as gymnastics. These place heavy emphasis upon weight and body image as ingredients for success in competition. In order to compete, 81% of wrestlers will deliberately lose weight. This involves shedding 3% to 20% of their body weight — most of which being dropped within a short period of time. For rhythmic gymnasts, “success is strongly influenced by visual appeal and body aesthetics. Rhythmic gymnasts are often required to meet certain weight targets to attain and maintain a thin shape.” The pressure to please is intense, and correspondingly, 42% of female aesthetic athletes have been diagnosed with eating disorders.

Youth athletes employ a variety of methods to lose weight, including dehydration, fasting, diet pills, laxatives, vomiting, and the use of rubber exercise suits. These practices result in “decreased plasma and blood volume, reduced cardiac outputs, impaired thermoregulatory responses, decreased renal blood flow, and an increase in the amount of electrolytes lost from the body.”

=== Long-term effects ===
It has been postulated that wrestlers may suffer impaired growth and development due to their fluctuating body weight. However, a study examining high school wrestler growth patterns concluded that participation does not stunt growth. In relation to eating disorders, young female gymnasts may suffer from delayed menarche, menstrual irregularities, low body fat, and delayed maturity. Of these athletes, 11% are at risk for a mental disorder, while 40% risk delayed physical maturation.

== Injuries ==
An issue unique to youth athletics is that the participants’ bones are still growing, placing them at highest risk for injury. Around 8,000 children are rushed to the emergency room daily because of sports injuries. High school athletes suffer approximately 715,000 injuries annually. Regarding American football, there are five times more catastrophic injuries in high school than compared to college-level competition.

=== Overuse injuries ===
Nearly half of all injuries in pediatric sports medicine are due to overuse. Such injuries can be attributed to inappropriate workout intensity and overlong athletic seasons. Other risk factors include sleep deprivation, general physical and cognitive immaturity, dietary imbalance and inadequate physical fitness. Among young athletes, common overuse injuries are stress fractures, which include injury of the: According to research, the frequency of injury varies from sport to sport as well as depending on the sex of the athlete. Body alignment can also impact overuse injuries. Types of body alignments are bowlegs, unequal leg lengths or flat/high arched feet, femoral neck/pubis, femoral shaft, tibia, fibula, metatarsals, calcaneus, and cuboid

=== Concussions ===
Although there has been a longstanding association between repetitive head injuries and subsequent brain damage amongst professional athletes such as boxers and football players, a possible association amongst youth and adolescent amateur sport participants has only recently been taken more seriously. For people of the age 22 and under, concussions have risen more than 500% since 2010. Concussions and serious brain injuries were previously considered important if there was an association with loss of consciousness but there is mounting evidence to suggest that injury may occur even when there are more subtle signs and symptoms such as dizziness and confusion. As the brain of a child or an adolescent is still developing, there is fear that these injuries may have permanent long term consequences.

=== Positive and negative effects ===
45 million children and adolescents participate in youth sports in the US. There are many positive and negative impacts on young athletes. Participation in sports raises energetic physical activity. The Center for Disease Control reported that in 1999 only 50% of youths engaged in regular exercise. Youth participation in sports can influence high-risk health-related impacts for boys and girls. A 2000 study showed the relationship between participation in sports and health-related behaviors in US youth athletes. Both boys and girls were more likely to eat fruits and vegetables and less likely to engage in smoking and illicit drug-taking.

There is a risk of injury for athletes of all ages when participating in sports. Young athletes are vulnerable to a variety of traumatic and overused injuries due to increased growth velocity and closure of the growth plates. Between the ages of 5-24, each year there are 2.6 million emergency room visits. Coaches and parents can put a lot of pressure on a youth athlete which can cause injury, burnout, over-scheduling, and the pressure to succeed. In the past, the New York Times ran an online debate on children’s sport-life balance. Some think that youth sports has become too competitive and too serious while others think youth sports are the best way to teach teamwork and discipline.

Not only do health issues affect athletes, but the financial burden that impacts their families is also significant. This can cause a strain in the family relationship. Vacations, savings, and normal family structure are sacrificed in order to support the athlete. Siblings can have positive and negative effects on the youth athlete. Siblings can be supportive and act as role models, but they can also experience feelings of bitterness, jealousy, and isolation.

Many high school students will experience some form of head injury during their experiences in amateur sports and the majority of these can be classified as concussions. Even by the beginning of high school, 53% of athletes will have already suffered a concussion. Less than 50% of them report it in order to stay in the game. Many concussions may be subtle and go undiagnosed. While the majority of these minor injuries will recover without consequence within 3 to 7 days, it is the repetitive injury that is associated with neurological sequela. Multiple concussions appear to have a cumulative effect on memory performance. If an athlete returns to competition before being completely healed, they are more susceptible to suffer another concussion. A repeat concussion can have a much slower recovery rate and be accompanied by increased symptoms and long-term effects. This “second impact syndrome” has, in some cases, been fatal. A history of concussion in football players has been linked to sports-related sudden death. The severity of complications from concussion can include brain swelling, blood clots and brain damage. Ice hockey, soccer, wrestling and basketball carry a high risk for concussion however, football is the most dangerous. Concussion causing situations that involve leading with the head, hitting head to head and striking a defenseless athlete have become subject to penalty in order to discourage players and coaches from this type of play. These rule changes have resulted in technique changes at the youngest levels of sports, and youth athletes are now being trained in methods avoiding illegal contact. Youth sport organizations have also made equipment changes to better protect players. A widespread myth is that helmets protect athletes from concussions; they are actually worn to prevent skull fractures. Facts like this have prompted trainings on proper equipment use and not utilizing helmets as an implement of contact.

Following the 2013 “second impact syndrome” death of 17 year-old Rowan Stringer, an Ottawa high school female rugby player, a coroner’s inquest took place and led to the development of the Rowan’s Law Advisory Committee which put forth 49 recommendations regarding the prevention and management of head injuries in amateur sports. Recommendations were made for mandatory training on the recognition and treatment of concussions for teachers, coaches and healthcare providers. Sport organizations are advised to develop rules of conduct amongst their players and to enforce a zero tolerance policy for aggressive play. In 2016, the Canadian federal government allotted 1.4 million dollars for the development of national amateur sport guidelines related to back-to-play and back-to-study protocols following concussion injuries.

== Sports-related death ==
Sometimes sports injuries can be so severe as to result in actual death. Over the past year, 48 youths died from sports injuries. The leading causes of death in youth sports are sudden cardiac arrest, concussion, heat illness and external sickling. Cardiac-related deaths are usually due to an undiagnosed cardiovascular disorder. Trauma to the head, neck and spine can also be lethal. Among young American athletes, more than half of trauma-related deaths are to football players, with track and field, baseball, boxing and soccer also having relatively high fatality rates.
