= Korey Stringer Institute =

Not-for-profit organazation

The Korey Stringer Institute (KSI) is a not-for-profit organization housed at the University of Connecticut dedicated to the prevention of sudden death in sports, with a focus on exertional heat stroke (EHS).

After Korey Stringer's death in August 2001 from EHS, Korey's widow, Kelci Stringer, settled her lawsuit against the National Football League (NFL) in January 2009. KSI stems from this settlement, with Kelci Stringer teaming up with EHS expert, Dr. Douglas Casa, from the University of Connecticut, and the NFL. The purpose of KSI is to minimize preventable deaths in sports through awareness, education, and research in the ways to accurately prevent, recognize, and treat symptoms quickly by being a resource to the entire sports community.

Gary Gertzog, who is the NFL’s senior vice president of business affairs said that "We all thought this was a terrific opportunity to increase the education at all levels of sports, particularly at the youth level, so that they understand how to prevent heat illness. We all have been parents or coaches for youth sports and we all have seen kids playing in very extreme weather conditions. They wanted to make sure everyone understands how important it is to be properly hydrated."

KSI serves the needs of active individuals and athletes at all levels — youth, high school, college, professional, people who are physically active, recreational athletes — and those who supervise and care for these individuals. Components of these services include: consultations, advocacy, education, research, athlete testing, and mass-market outreach.

The Korey Stringer Institute is housed in the College of Agriculture, Health, and Natural Resources at the University of Connecticut. UConn's Department of Kinesiology has a strong tradition and reputation as one of the leading institutions studying health and safety issues for athletes and the physically active.

KSI is partnered with the NFL, Gatorade, NATA, Camelbak, Kestrel, Mission, Eagle Pharmaceuticals and HQ Inc. to further advance its efforts and goals.
