= Elizabeth Broderick =

Australian lawyer

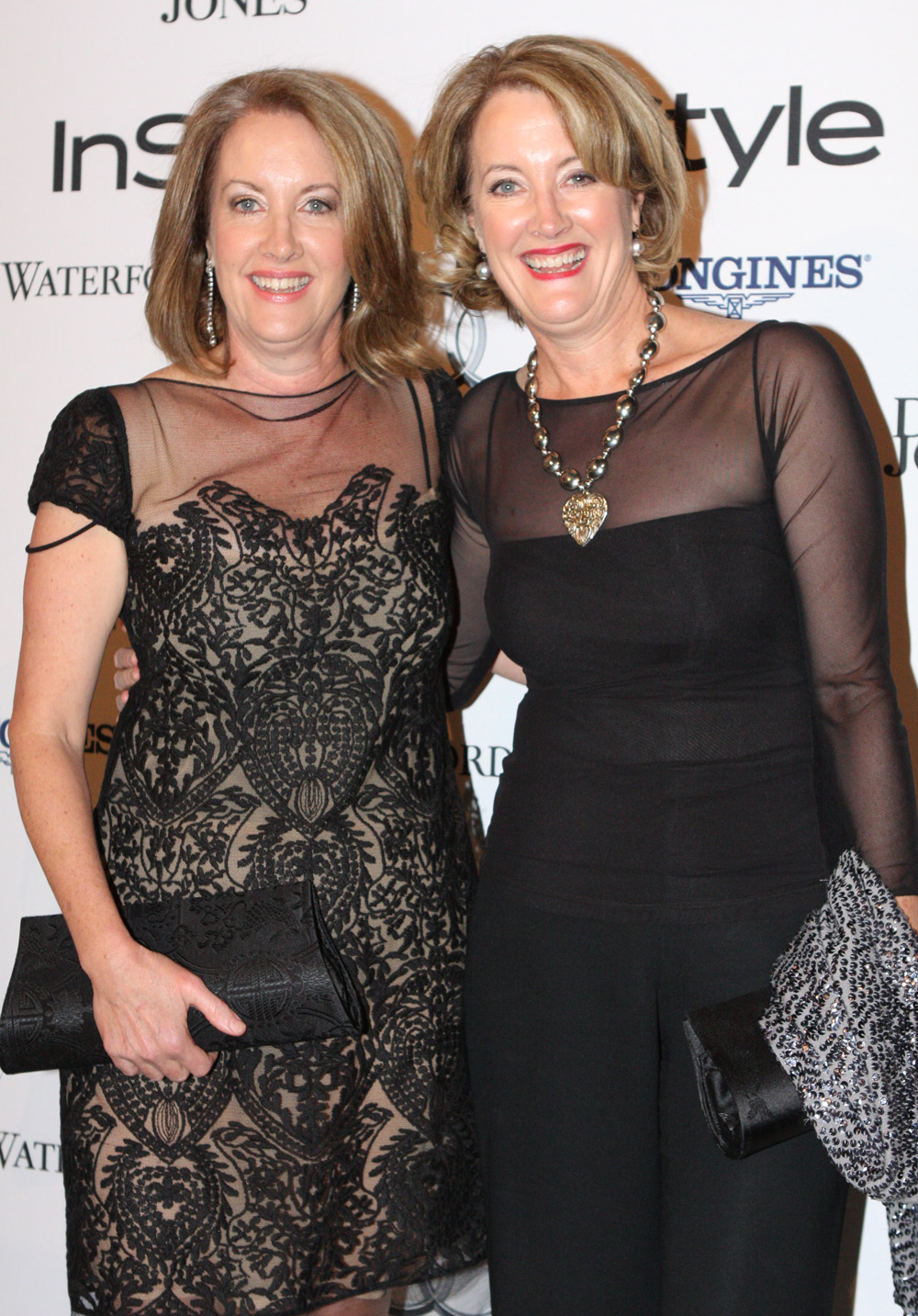
Elizabeth Broderick on the left and her twin sister Jane Latimer on the right in 2013

Elizabeth Broderick AO is an Australian lawyer, who was the Australian Sex Discrimination Commissioner for over eight years from 2007 to 2015 and has been a United Nations special rapporteur for Discrimination against Women and Girls since 2017. She is a former partner and head of legal technology at Ashurst Australia (then called Blake Dawson Waldron), a global commercial law firm.

== Early life and education ==
Broderick grew up in Caringbah, New South Wales as the daughter of a doctor and physiotherapist, Frank and Margot. She has two sisters including an identical twin, emeritus Professor Jane Latimer AO, and Carolyn Broderick. Elizabeth Broderick was head girl in 1978 at Meriden School, Strathfield while Jane Latimer was head girl at MLC School in neighbouring Burwood in the same year.

== Career ==
Broderick is trained as a lawyer. She has spoken publicly about her own experiences of sexual harassment by a client as a young lawyer.

At law firm Blake Dawson Waldron (now Ashurst), Broderick worked part-time for twelve years while she was a partner - the first partner at the firm to work part-time. She also created a database giving people legal advice at low cost. Broderick was named "Telstra NSW Business Woman of the Year" (2000–2001).

=== Sex Discrimination Commissioner ===
Broderick was appointed Sex Discrimination Commissioner by Prime Minister John Howard in 2007. Her term was extended by the Rudd government and again by the Abbott government. As Sex Discrimination Commissioner, Broderick worked on equal-pay cases, "proposed a model for the paid parental leave scheme", and commented publicly on sexual harassment cases.

Broderick persuaded some of "the most powerful men in the country" to publicly commit to being part of a group called Male Champions of Change (MCC) and take action on gender inequality. The group is still active and has inspired the creation of many MCC groups in other sectors, including architecture, property, elite sports and in Victoria. Current members of the Founding MCC group include, Alan Joyce, Kevin McCann, Martin Parkinson, David Thodey and Lieutenant General David Morrison.

The Male Champions of Change have released progress reports in 2011, 2013 and 2014. They also partnered with Chief Executive Women to develop a model for leaders to use in order to examine their own actions and "Leadership Shadow".

In 2014, Broderick published a fourth and final report on gender-discriminatory practices in the Australian Defence Force.

Broderick finished up as Sex Discrimination Commissioner in 2015 and was succeeded by Kate Jenkins.

=== United Nations Rapporteur ===
Broderick established her own consultancy specialising in gender equality and was then appointed by the United Nations as a Special Rapporteur for the Working Group on Discrimination against Women and Girls in 2017. She works alongside four other female experts to report to the Human Rights Council in Geneva on discrimination against women around the world. She served until 2023 and she was succeeded by the American law professor Claudia Flores.

In 2018, Broderick launched Male Champions of Change globally.

== Recognition and awards ==
- 2014: Winner in the Diversity category as well as overall winner in the Women of Influence Award
- 2015: Winner, Impact 25
- 2015: Honorary Doctorate of Laws conferred by the University of New South Wales, Sydney, for her "eminent service to both the Australian and international community"
- 2016: New South Wales Australian of the Year, for being a "powerful and influential voice in the struggle for gender equality enlisting both women and men as agents of change"
- 2016: Australian Award for Excellence in Women's Leadership from the Women & Leadership Australia
- 2016: Inductee, Hall of Fame in the Women's Agenda Leadership Awards
- 2017: Officer of the Order of Australia
