= Sports Medicine Australia =

Australian sports health organisation

Sports Medicine Australia is Australia's peak national umbrella body for sports medicine and sports science. It was established in 1963 as the Australian Sports Medicine Federation. Its current membership includes sports medicine and health professionals, sports trainers, sporting clubs and community members. Its activities cover elite sport to community grass roots sports. It has branches in each Australian state.

== History ==
It was formed in 1963 by the amalgamation of the Australian Sports Medicine Association and the Australian and the Australian Federation of Sports Medicine. Australian Sports Medicine Federation was established as a result of 1956 Melbourne Olympics medical services. Australian Sports Medicine Federation was a New South Wales breakaway group of Australian Sports Medicine Federation. Membership was originally restricted to medical doctors but now it has been widened to include a range of practitioners including: orthopedic surgeons, sports physicians, doctors, physiotherapists, optometrists, dentists, podiatrists, dietitians, psychologists, sports scientists, nurses, teachers, academics, soft tissue therapists and chiropractors. Some of these membership groups have established their own organisations – Australasian College of Sport and Exercise Physicians (ACSEP), Sports Dietitians Australia, Exercise and Sports Science Australia, Sports Doctors Australia, Australian Physiotherapy Association National Sports Physiotherapy Group but work with SMA particularly in relation to joint conferences.

Brief summary of major historical developments:

- 1963 – Australian Sports Medicine Federation established
- 1964 – Australian Journal of Sports Medicine first published. Now called Journal of Science and Medicine in Sport.
- 1965 – inaugural Australian Sports Medicine Federation Conference, Adelaide, South Australia
- 1974 – hosted FIMS Conference, Melbourne
- 1982 – Launched the Australian Sports Trainers Scheme and published the Survey of Drug Use in Australian Sport
- 1983 – Sport Health magazine first published
- 1984 – Established National Office in Canberra, Australian Capital Territory
- 1986 – hosted XXIII FIMS World Congress in Sports Medicine, Melbourne
- 1989 – Published Guidelines for Safety in Sport
- 1999 – 5th International Olympic Committee World Congress on Sports Sciences, Sydney
- 2010 – National Office becomes a virtual office with staff members being located in state offices.

== Services ==
=== Conferences ===
It held its 1st Conference in 1965 and its annual conference is Australia's largest and most significant sports medicine and sports science conference. Many state branches run conferences for their members.

=== Resources ===
SMA publishes a range of sports medicine resources: guidelines and factsheets on sports medicine issues such as heat, blood rules, children, women, journals Journal of Science and Medicine in Sport and Sport Health and sports first aid resources. Journal of Science and Medicine in Sport is one of the leading multidisciplinary sports science and medicine journals in terms of its impact.

=== Sports Trainers ===
In 1982, it established a sports trainers scheme. The scheme is now part of its Safer Sport Program (SSP) that aims to offer a safe environment for all Australians who engage in sport and to maximise participation in physical activity. It organises sports trainers to cover sporting, school and community events.

=== Advice and Commentary ===
Sports Medicine Australia provides advice and commentary to governments, organisations and the media on a range of issues including: head injuries and concussion, sport and exercise in the heat and cold, illnesses, skiing injuries, mouthguards, and childhood obesity.
