= Sex Discrimination Commissioner =

Australian federal government position

The Sex Discrimination Commissioner is an Australian federal government position established to oversee the operation of the Sex Discrimination Act 1984. The position was created alongside the Act as one of the specialist commissioners of the Human Rights and Equal Opportunity Commission. The commissioner also has an educative role, frequently called upon to comment upon gender issues in the workforce.

== History ==
The Office of the Sex Discrimination Commissioner was created by the Sex Discrimination Act 1984. The Hawke government appointed Pam O'Neil, a Labor MLA from the Northern Territory, as the first commissioner.

She was replaced in 1988 by Quentin Bryce, who later became Australia's first female Governor-General in 2008. The fate of the position appeared unclear in the late 1990s, as Susan Halliday, the then-Commissioner, repeatedly came into conflict with the John Howard's Liberal–National Coalition government , despite being a Liberal appointee. Halliday's angry resignation in 2001 led to speculation that the office may be disbanded. Pru Goward, known to be a close personal friend of Howard, was appointed to the position in 2001.

Goward resigned in late 2006 in order to run for the New South Wales Legislative Assembly, and was replaced in mid-2007 by lawyer Elizabeth Broderick, a former partner with Blake Dawson. Kate Jenkins served as Commissioner from 2016 to 2023, with a focus on the advancement of gender equality and LGBTIQ+ rights.

Anna Cody took over the role in September 2023, bringing a focus on the lives and experiences of First Nations women and girls and those from culturally and linguistically diverse backgrounds.

== Reviews by Kate Jenkins ==
=== Respect@Work Report ===
In January 2020, Sex Discrimination Commissioner Kate Jenkins handed to the Morrison government her Respect@Work Report, described by the ABC as “a landmark national inquiry into sexual harassment in workplaces by the Australian Human Rights Commission” . On 8 April 2021, the Morrison government released its response to the report, which it has dubbed A Roadmap for Respect: Preventing and Addressing Sexual Harassment in Australian Workplaces, accepting (either wholly or in principle) or “noted” all 55 recommendations. Though the legislation is still to be prepared, it was indicated that the definition of “serious misconduct” in workplaces will include sexual harassment, which will also be a valid reason for dismissal. Judges and politicians will be subject to the same sexual harassment laws as the wider population. Under human rights laws, the time limit for complaints will be extended from six months to two years.

=== Review of Parliament House's workplace culture ===
On 5 March 2021, Jenkins said she would lead a review of Parliament House's workplace culture following the 2021 Australian Parliament House sexual misconduct allegations. The report of this review, titled; Set the Standard: Report on the Independent Review into Commonwealth Parliamentary Workplaces was tabled in November 2021, and in response to its recommendations the Parliamentary Workplace Support Service, The Parliamentary Leadership Taskforce, and a Staff Consultative Group have been established to support workplace accountability well-being and safety in Parliament.

== Reviews by Anna Cody ==
=== Equal Identities ===
Equal Identities is a report of the findings of an AHRC human rights review of the experiences of trans and gender diverse people in Australia. In June 2025 the AHRC announced that it was conducting national project to map threats to trans and gender diverse human rights in Australia, and had been accepting submissions from individuals and civil society organizations with relevant expertise and lived experience. Published in March 2026, the Equal Identities report provides a national human rights review of the experiences of trans and gender diverse Australians. The findings and recommendations were informed by the 97 submissions received during the review process, as well as Australian and international research. The report makes 19 recommendations based on Australia's commitments under international human rights law. These recommendations are linked to three interconnected themes of being safe, being seen and heard (dignity), and being able to participate.

== List of Sex Discrimination Commissioners ==
- Pam O'Neil (1984–1988)
- Quentin Bryce (1988–1993)
- Sue Walpole (1993–1997)
- Susan Halliday (1998–2001)
- Pru Goward (2001–2006)
- Elizabeth Broderick (2007–2015)
- Kate Jenkins (2016–2023)
- Anna Cody (2023–present)

== See also ==
- Sex discrimination
- Australian Human Rights Commission
- Sex Discrimination Act 1984

== External sources ==
Sex Discrimination Act 1984 on Austlii
