= John Crosby =

John Crosby may refer to:

== Politics ==
- John Crosby (Georgia politician), state senator from Georgia
- John Crawford Crosby (1859–1943), American politician
- John Schuyler Crosby (1839–1914), governor of Montana
- John Crosby (MP for City of London) (fl.1467)

== Others ==
- John Crosby (actor) (died 1724), English stage actor
- John Crosby (businessman), Australian farmer
- John Crosby (conductor) (1926–2002), founding director of the Santa Fe Opera, 1957–2000
- John Crosby (died 1476), merchant, alderman and diplomat
- John Crosby (General Mills) (1828–1887), partner of Washburn-Crosby Company
- John Crosby (media critic) (1912–1991), media critic of the New York Herald Tribune
- John Crosby Jr. (born 1951), American Olympic gymnast
- John F. Crosby (attorney), American attorney
- John F. Crosby (philosopher), American philosopher
- John O. Crosby (born 1850), African American educator and 1st President of North Carolina Agricultural and Technical State University, 1892–1896
- John S. Crosby (general) (born 1932), United States Army general
- John Sherwin Crosby (1842–1914), single-tax proponent
- Jon Crosby (born 1976), American musician

== See also ==
- John Crosbie (disambiguation)
