= Drezner =

Drezner may refer to:

- Tomasz Drezner (1560 - 1616), Polish jurist
- Hanna Drezner-Tzakh (born 1947, Tel Aviv), a female Israeli singer
- Daniel W. Drezner (born 1968, Syracuse, New York), scholar of international
- Jon Drezner, an American architect and designer
- Jonathan Drezner, an American sports medicine physician

== See also ==
Related surnames

- Dresdner
