= Burski =

Burski (feminine: Burska; plural: Burscy) is a Polish surname. Notable people with this surname include:

- Adam Burski (c. 1560–1611), Polish philosopher
- Bogna Burska (born 1974), Polish playwright and visual artist
