= Destruction of Warsaw =

1944 Nazi razing of Warsaw

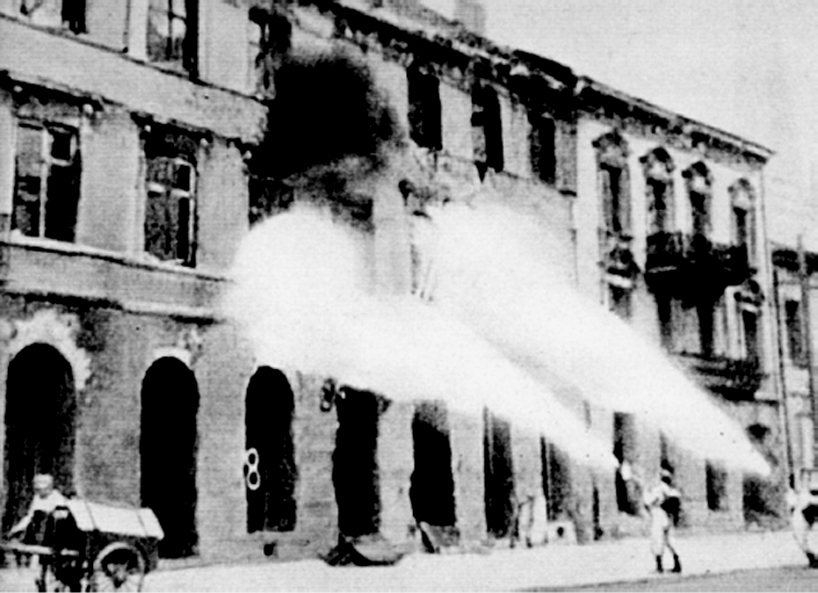
German Brandkommando (Burning Detachment) burning a building in Warsaw. Taken on Leszno street.

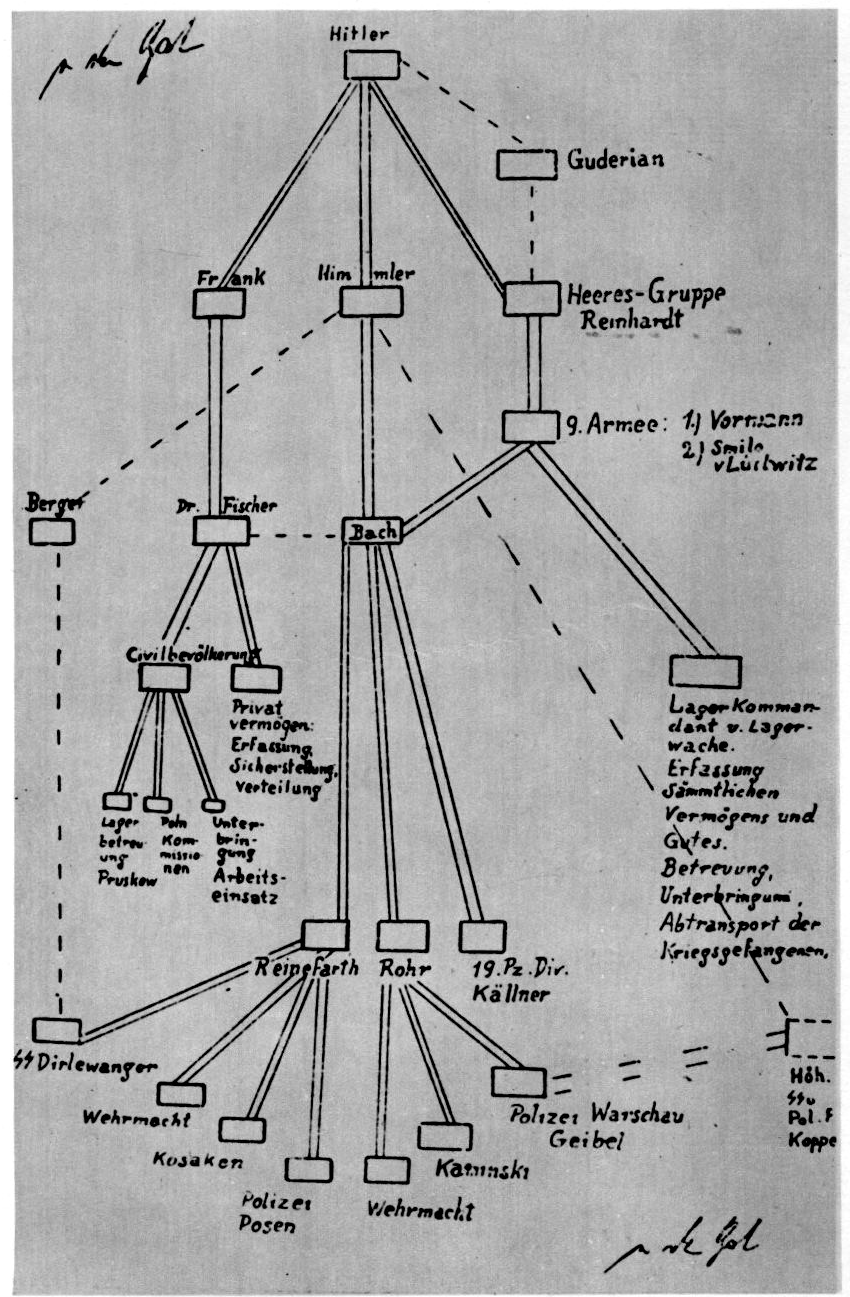
Command hierarchy of Germany forces realizing Warsaw's destruction (drawing by Erich von dem Bach-Zelewski during 1945–46 Nuremberg Trials)

The city must completely disappear from the surface of the earth and serve only as a transport station for the Wehrmacht. No stone can remain standing. Every building must be razed to its foundation.

— SS chief Heinrich Himmler, SS officers' conference, 17 October 1944

The destruction of Warsaw was Nazi Germany's systematic razing of the Polish capital in late 1944, ordered in retaliation following the Warsaw Uprising of the Polish resistance. This event was not a spontaneous reaction but the execution of a pre-existing design known as the Pabst Plan, which sought the complete annihilation of Warsaw to enable the forced Germanization of Central and Eastern Europe under Generalplan Ost. By late 1944, however, the German war effort was entirely lost, and plans for Eastern colonization had been abandoned. Consequently, the eradication of the city served absolutely no military or colonial purpose; it was executed as a purely vindictive act of malice and collective punishment against the Polish population.

German forces directed unprecedented, calculated effort toward this malicious campaign, deliberately destroying 80–90% of Warsaw's buildings and wiping out centuries of cultural identity. Specialized demolition squads methodically burned, looted, and dynamited the vast majority of museums, art galleries, theaters, churches, and historical landmarks like castles and palaces to ensure the total erasure of Polish heritage. The scale of this calculated devastation was uniquely severe in the history of World War II, prompting historian Alexandra Richie to emphasize that the complete obliterative intent behind the destruction of Warsaw stood out as unparalleled even within the exceptional horrors of the conflict. Following the Axis defeat, an extensive, decades-long reconstruction effort was launched to painstakingly rebuild the capital using pre-war blueprints and architectural records.

== Prewar plan of destruction ==
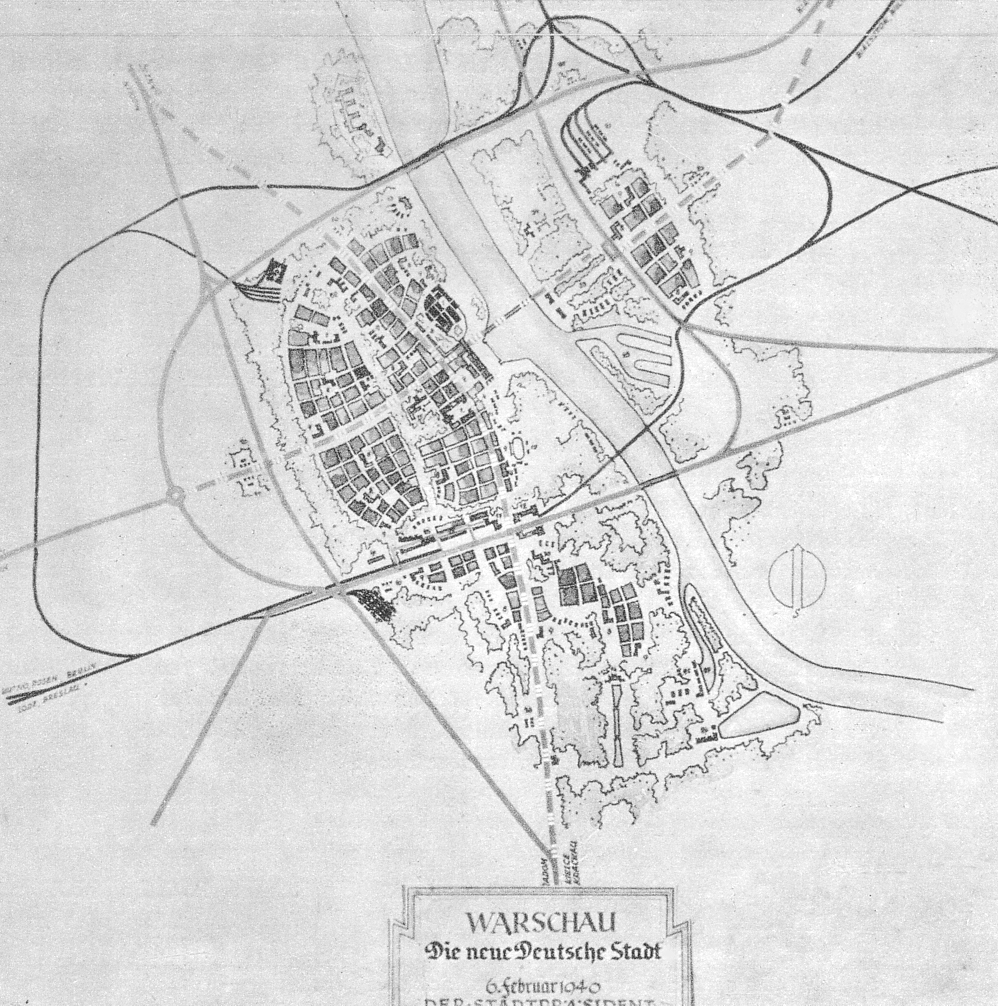
Plan for Neue deutsche Stadt Warschau ("New German city of Warsaw")

On June 20, 1939, while Adolf Hitler was visiting an architectural bureau in Würzburg am Main, he noticed a project of a future German town – Neue deutsche Stadt Warschau ("New German city of Warsaw"). According to the Pabst Plan, Warsaw was to be turned into a provincial German city of 130,000. Third Reich planners drafted precise drawings outlining a historic "Germanic" core where a select few landmarks would be saved, such as the Royal Castle which would serve as Hitler's state residence. The Plan, which was composed of 15 drawings and a miniature architectural model, was named after German army architect Friedrich Pabst who refined the concept of destroying a nation's morale and culture by destroying its physical and architectural manifestations. The design of the actual new German city over the site of Warsaw was devised by Hubert Gross. The aftermath of the failure of the Warsaw Uprising presented an opportunity for Hitler to begin to realize his pre-war conception.

== Warsaw Uprising's aftermath ==
=== Expulsion of civilians ===
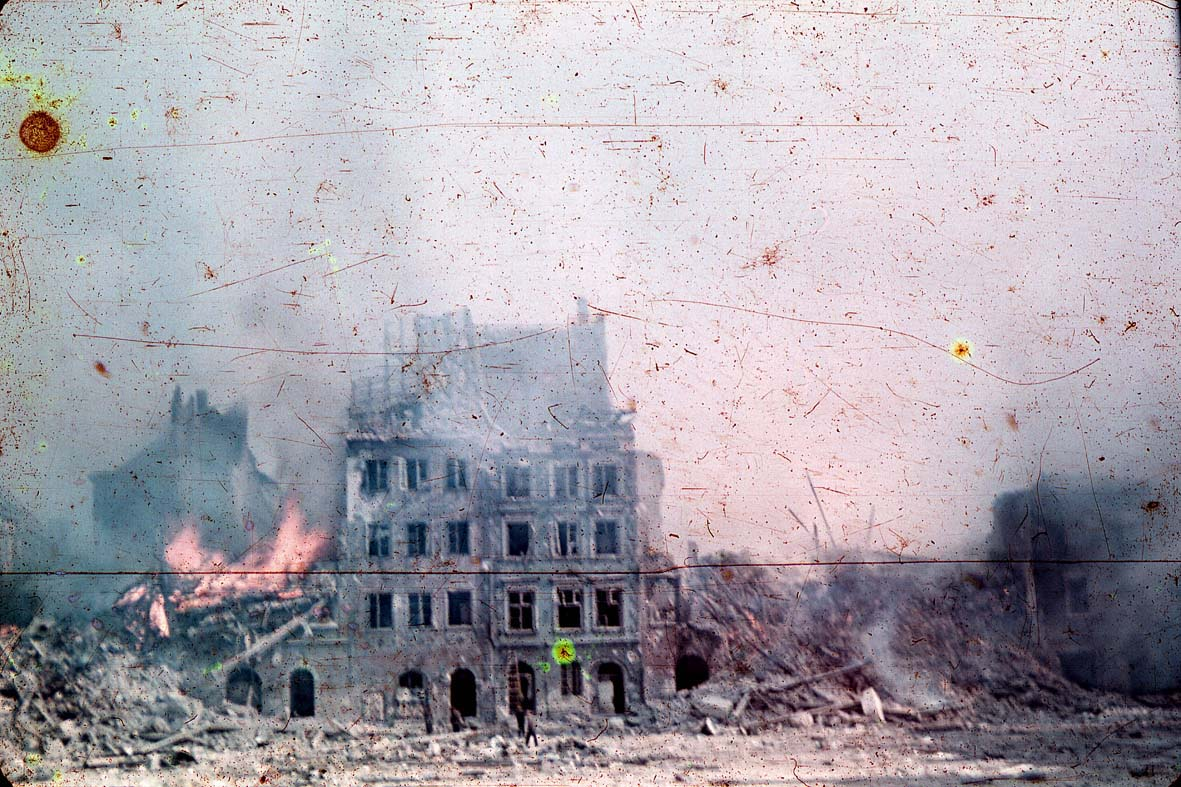
Warsaw Uprising, August 1944

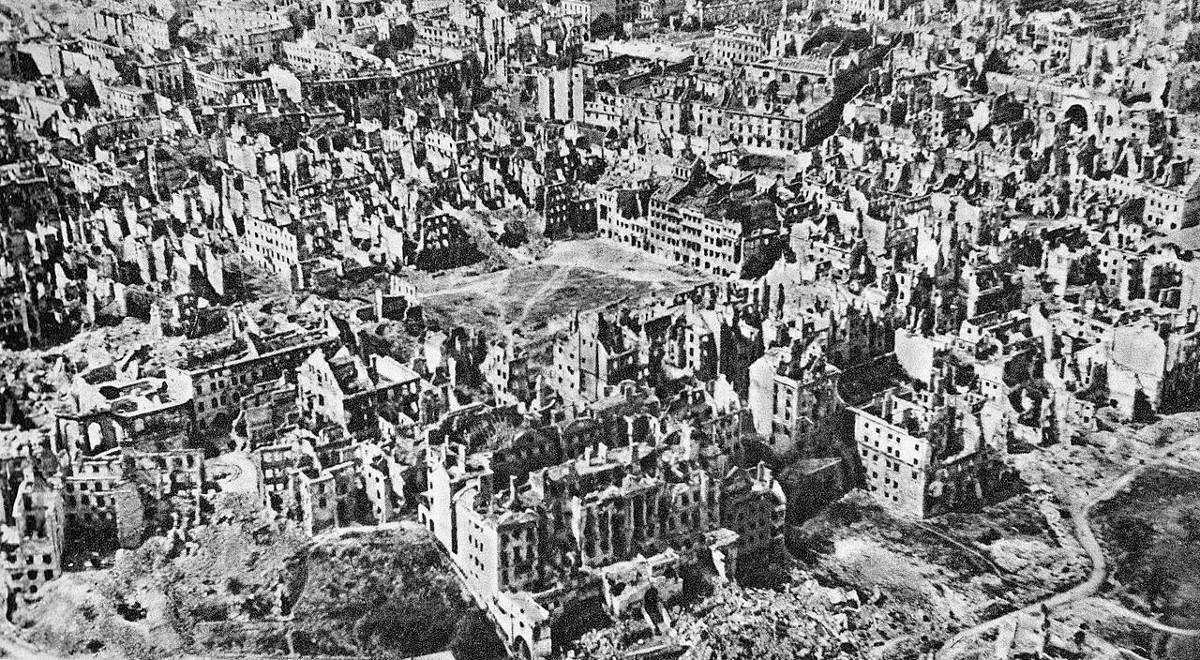
Ruins of the Old Town Market Place in January 1945

The Warsaw Uprising was launched by the Polish Home Army on August 1, 1944, as part of Operation Tempest. In response, under orders from Heinrich Himmler, Warsaw was kept under ceaseless barrage by Nazi artillery and air power for sixty-three days and nights by Erich von dem Bach-Zelewski.

In 1944, a large transit camp: (Durchgangslager, or Dulag) was constructed in Pruszków's Train Repair Shops (Zakłady Naprawcze Taboru Kolejowego) to house the evacuees expelled from Warsaw. In the course of the Warsaw Uprising and its suppression, the Germans deported approximately 550,000 of the city's residents and approximately 100,000 civilians from its outskirts, sending them to Dulag 121 Pruszków. The security police and the SS segregated the deportees and decided their fate. Approximately 650,000 people passed through the Pruszków camp in August, September, and October. Approximately 55,000 were sent to concentration camps, including 13,000 to Auschwitz. They included people from a variety of social classes, occupations, physical conditions, and ages. Evacuees ranged from infants only a few weeks old to the extremely elderly. In a few cases, these were also people of different ethnic backgrounds, including Jews living on "Aryan papers".

=== Looting and destruction of buildings ===
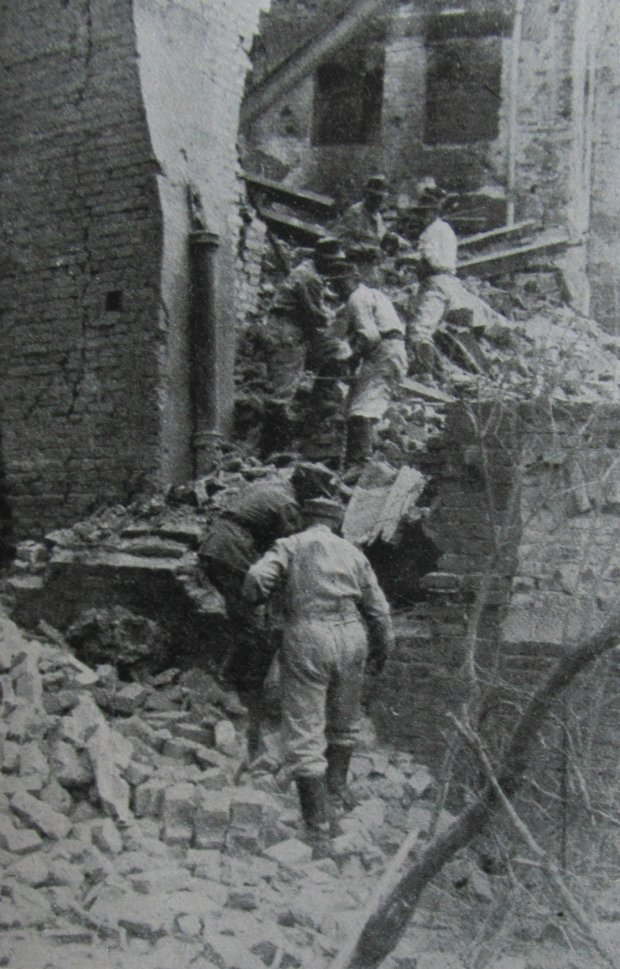
Sprengkommando preparing to blow up the Royal Castle, 8 September 1944

After the remaining population had been expelled, the Germans began the destruction of the remnants of the city. Special groups of German combat engineers were dispatched throughout the city in order to burn (Brandkommandos) and demolish (Sprengkommandos) the remaining buildings. According to German plans, after the war Warsaw was to be turned into nothing more than a military transit station.

By January 1945, between 85% and 90% of the buildings had been completely destroyed; this includes up to 10% as a result of the September 1939 campaign and following combat, up to 15% during the earlier Warsaw Ghetto Uprising, 25% during the Uprising, and 40% due to systematic German demolition of the city after the uprising.

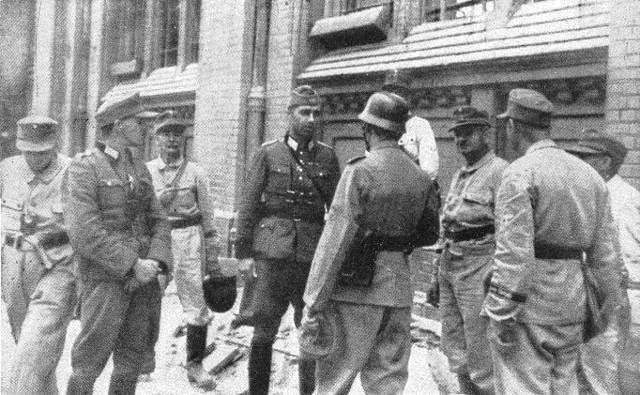
German demolition unit (Sprengkommando) led by Major Sarnow

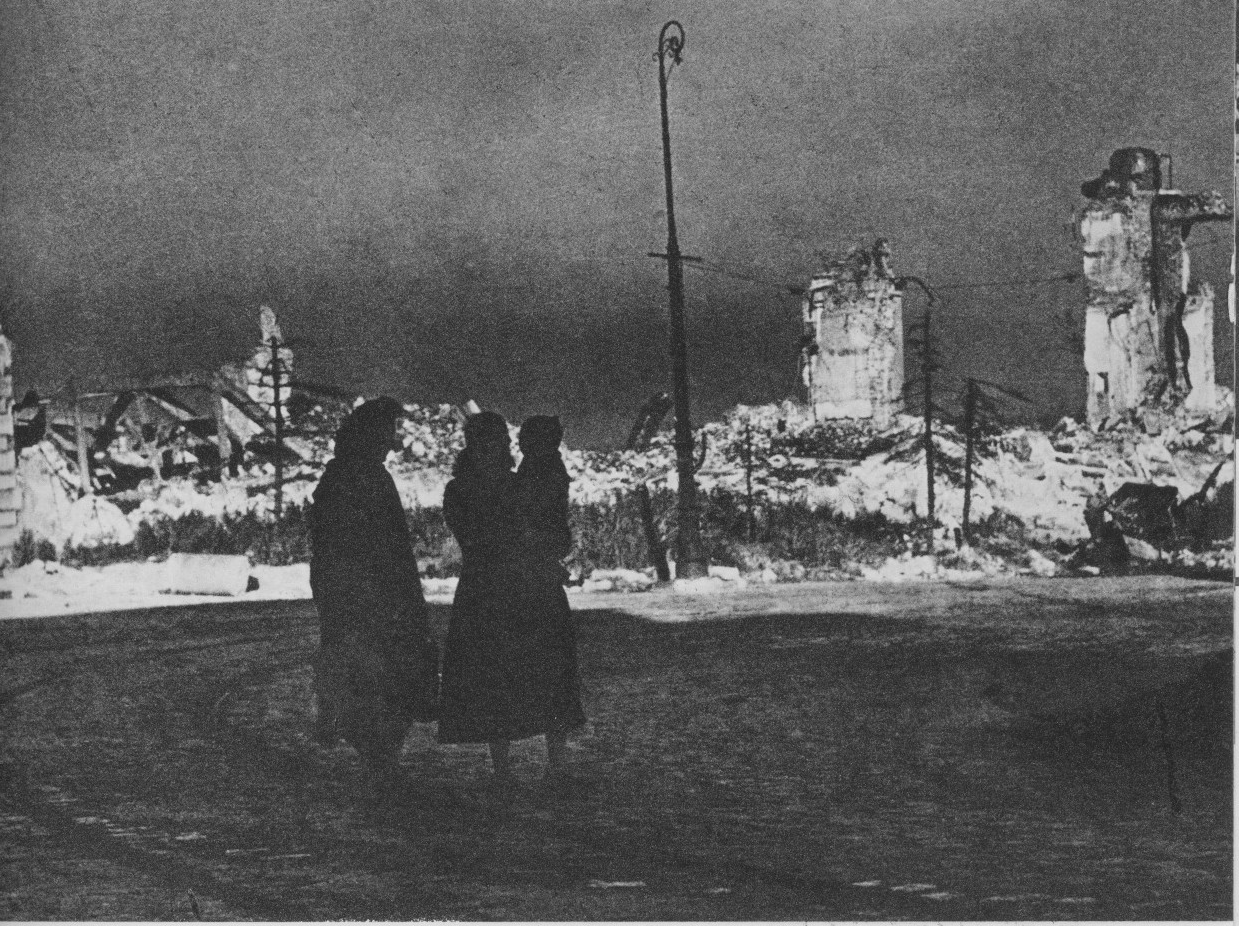
Royal Castle Square destroyed, Warsaw, 1945 view

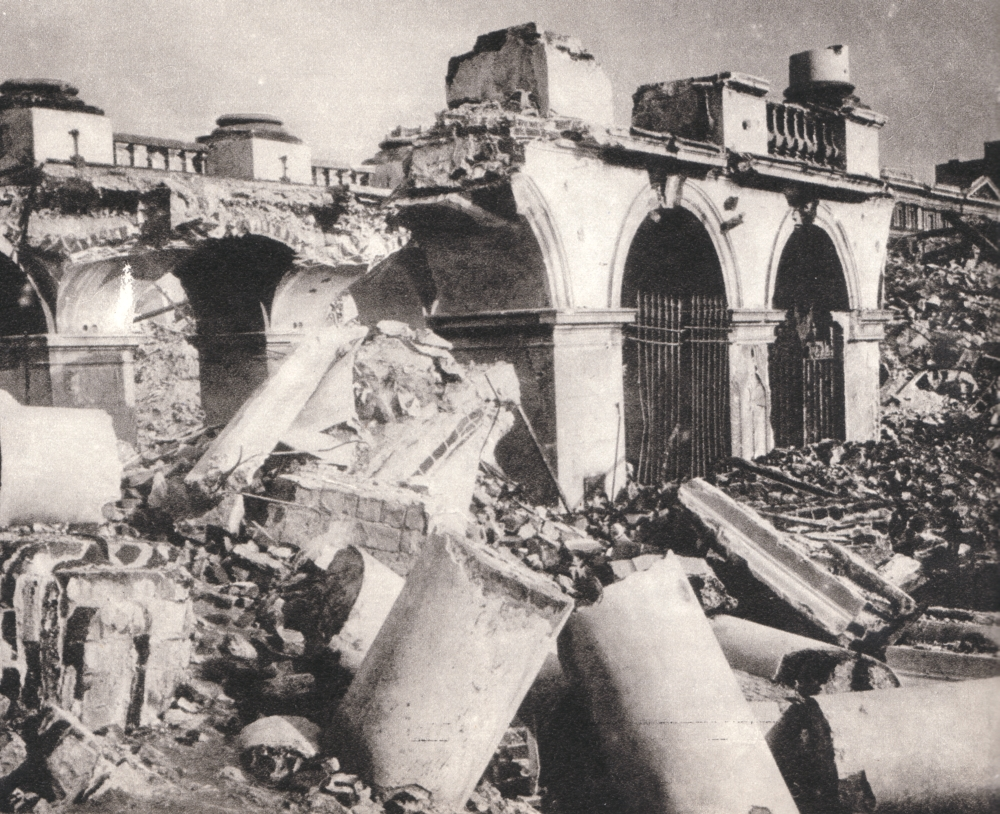
Remains of the Saxon Palace and the Tomb of the Unknown Soldier, 1945

Material losses were estimated at 10,455 buildings, 923 historical buildings (94%), 25 churches, 14 libraries including the National Library, 81 primary schools, 64 high schools, the University of Warsaw, the Warsaw University of Technology, and most of the city's historical monuments. Almost a million inhabitants lost all of their possessions. The exact losses of private and public property, including pieces of art, other cultural artifacts and scientific artifacts, is unknown but must be considered substantial since Warsaw and its inhabitants were the wealthiest Poles in pre-war Poland. In 2004, the President of Warsaw, Lech Kaczyński (later President of Poland), established a historical commission to estimate losses to public property alone that were inflicted on the city by German authorities. The commission estimated the losses to be at least $31.5 billion. Those estimates were later raised to $45 billion and in 2005, to $54.6 billion (all equated to 2004 dollars). The official estimates do not include immense losses of private property, which are of unknown value since almost all of the pre-war documents (such as insurance values of private collections) have also been destroyed, but are considered between double and triple the official estimates (which are based on documented losses only while for example, the National Library's list of pre-war property lost estimated to be 1% of its collection since Germans destroyed all archives too).

=== Burning of libraries ===
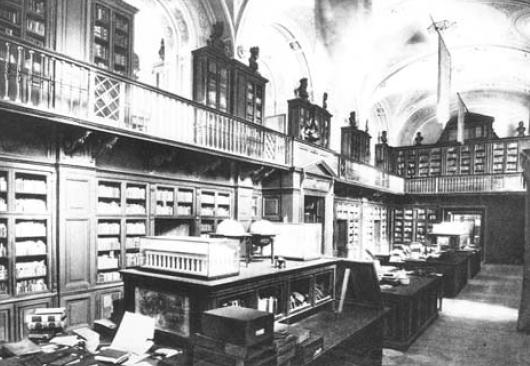
Interior of the Zamoyski Estate Library in a building at Żabia Street

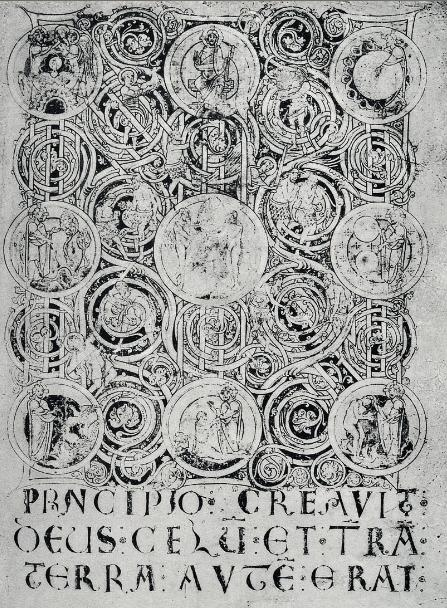
The 12th-century Meuse School Bible, one of the books burned by the Germans in October 1944

During the German suppression of the Warsaw Uprising of 1944, around 70 to 80% of libraries were carefully burned by the Brandkommandos (burning detachments), whose mission was to burn Warsaw. In October 1944 the Załuski Library, the oldest public library in Poland and one of the oldest and most important libraries in Europe (established in 1747), was burned down. Out of about 400,000 printed items, maps and manuscripts, only some 1,800 manuscripts and 30,000 printed materials survived.

In the last phase of the Warsaw Uprising and after its collapse, in September and October 1944, the three major private libraries in Warsaw (Krasiński Library, Przeździecki Library and the Library of Zamoyski Family Entail), including collections of priceless value to Polish culture, ceased to exist. Those libraries had already suffered in September 1939, when they were bombed and burned.

An important collection of books belonging to the Krasiński Library, created in 1844, was largely destroyed in 1944. The collection originally consisted of 250,000 items. During the Uprising, on September 5, 1944, the library's warehouses were shelled by German artillery and burned almost completely. Some of the books were preserved, thrown through windows by the library's staff. The surviving collection was later deliberately burned by the Germans in October 1944 after the collapse of the Uprising. About 26,000 manuscripts, 2,500 incunables, 80,000 early printed books, 100,000 drawings and prints, 50,000 note and theater manuscripts, and a large collection of maps and atlases were lost. The Przeździecki Estate Library in 6 Foksal Street included 60,000 volumes and 500 manuscripts, a rich archive containing 800 parchment and paper documents, and a cartographic collection consisting of 350 maps, atlases and plans. In addition to 10,000 prints and drawings, there was an extensive art gallery (Portrait of Casimir Jagiellon from the 15th century, the Portrait of John III Sobieski from the Schleissheim Palace, the House altar of Sophia Jagiellon, 1456), and a valuable collection of miniatures and decorative art: textiles, porcelain, faience, glass, gold objects, military, etc. It burned down on September 25, 1939 as a result of severe aerial bombardment by the Germans (incendiary bombing). The surviving items sheltered in the neighbouring tenement house at Szczygla Street were burned in October 1944. The last of above mentioned libraries, the Library of the Zamoyski Family Entail, acquired collections of 70,000 works (97,000 volumes), more than 2,000 manuscripts, 624 parchment diplomas, several thousand manuscripts, a collection of engravings, coins and 315 maps and atlases. Library collections also gathered numerous collections of art: a rich collection of militaria, miniatures, porcelain, faience and glass, natural collections, research tools etc., gathered mostly during the existence of the Zamoyski Academy. In 1939, about 50,000 items (about 30%) were destroyed in bombing. On September 8, 1944, the Germans set fire to both the Zamoyski Palace (Blue Palace) and the library building.

The Central Military Library, containing 350,000 books on the history of Poland, was destroyed, including the Library of Polish Museum in Rapperswil deposited there for safekeeping. The collection of the Rapperswil Library had been transported to Poland in 1927. The library and the museum were founded in Rapperswil, Switzerland, in 1870 as "a refuge for [Poland's] historic memorabilia dishonored and plundered in the [occupied Polish] homeland" and for the promotion of Polish interests. The greater part of library's collections, originally 20,000 engravings, 92,000 books and 27,000 manuscripts, were deliberately destroyed by the Germans in 1944.

Unlike earlier Nazi book burnings where specific books were deliberately targeted, the burning of those libraries was part of the general burning of a large part of the city of Warsaw. This resulted in the disappearance of many valuable old books and scrolls among about sixteen million volumes from National Library, museums and palaces burnt indiscriminately by Germans in Poland during World War II.

=== Scope of destruction ===
Estimated Warsaw city destruction during German occupation 1939–1945
| Category | Destroyed |
|---|---|
| Roadway and railway bridges | 100% |
| Theatres and cinemas | 95% |
| Industry | 90% |
| Healthcare buildings | 90% |
| Historical monument buildings | 90% |
| Tram infrastructure | 85% |
| Tram rolling stock | 75% |
| Housing | 72% |
| Education | 70% |
| Trees in parks and gardens | 60% |
| Electricity | 50% |
| Gas pipes | 46% |
| Water supply | 30% |
| Roadways surface | 30% |

== Gallery ==
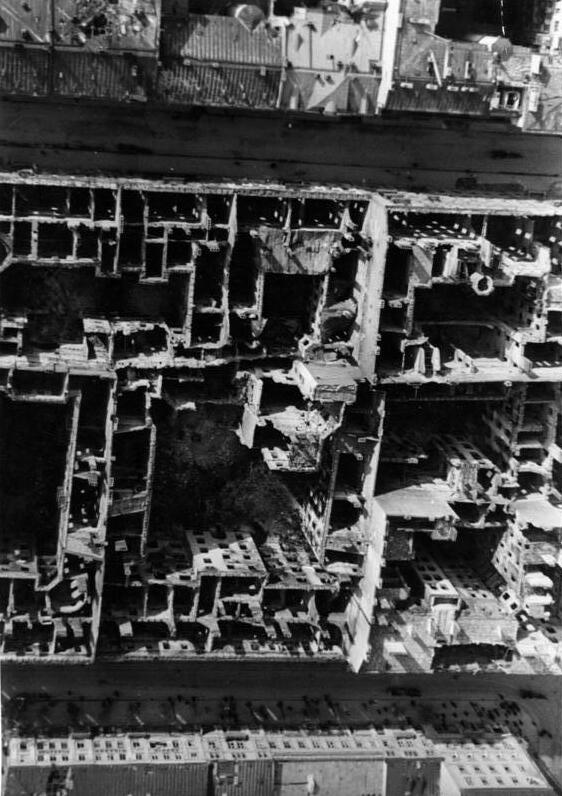
Warsaw during World War II: destroyed townhouses between Zielna (top) and Marszałkowska streets (bottom). In bottom right corner building Marszałkowska 156 on the corner with Królewskia street, also visible Bloch Palace at Marszałkowska 154. September 1939.

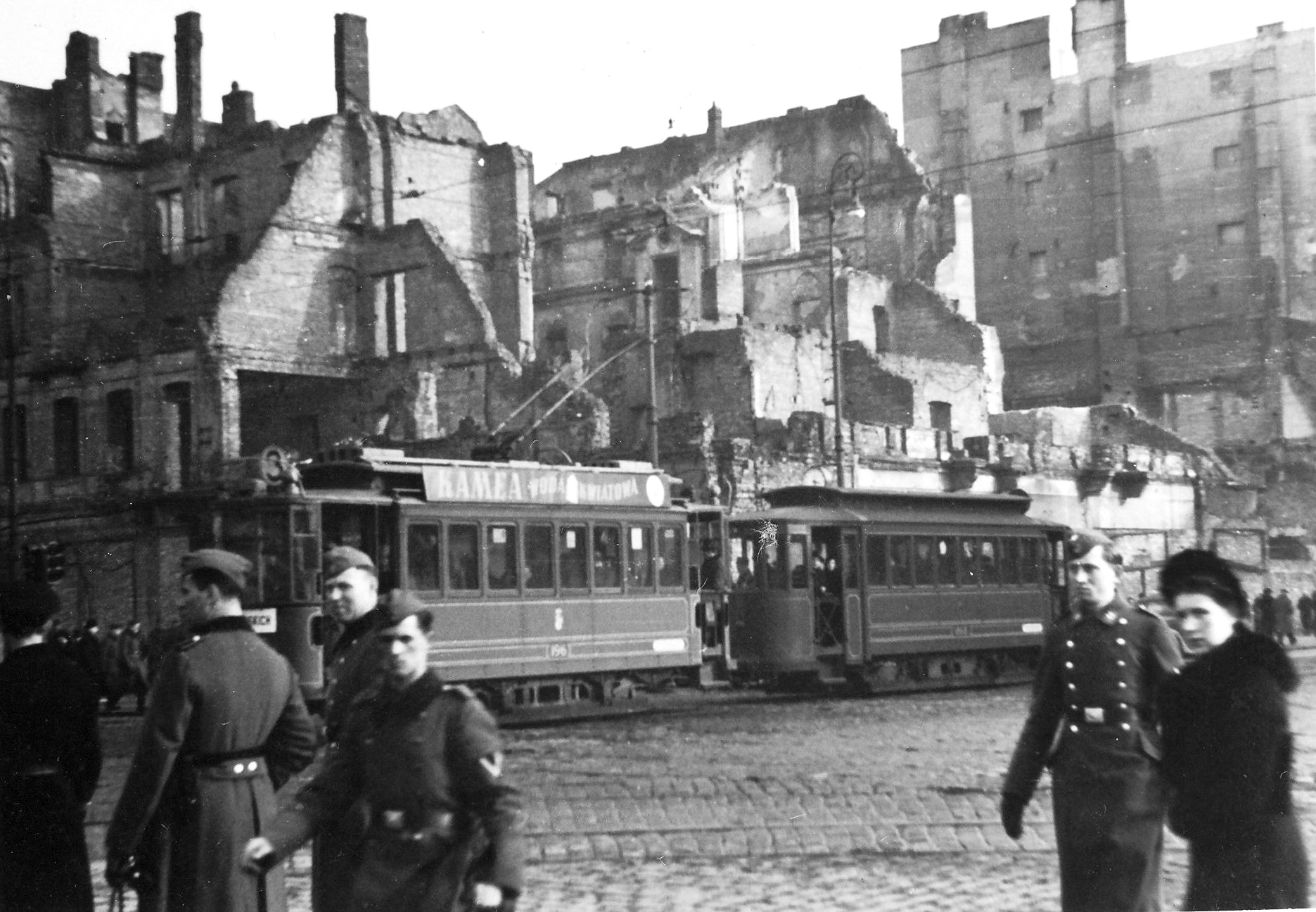
Intersection of Marszałkowska Street and Aleje Jerozolimskie Street in Warsaw during German occupation. Visible tramway #3 with a billboard "Kamea woda kwiatowa". Behind it ruins of destroyed in 1939 townhouse at Marszałkowska 98/al. Jerozolimskie 33 streets.

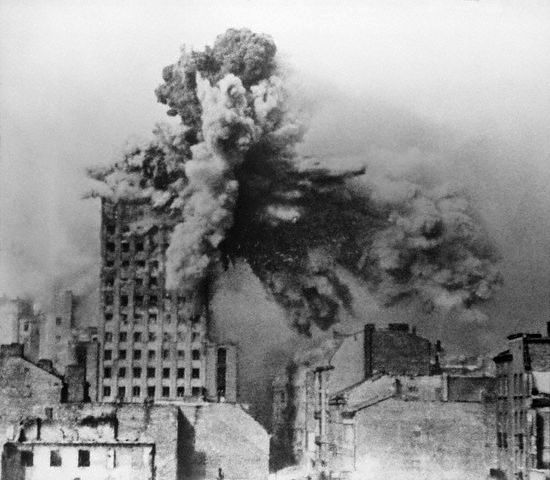
Prudential House, hit by a 2-ton mortar shell

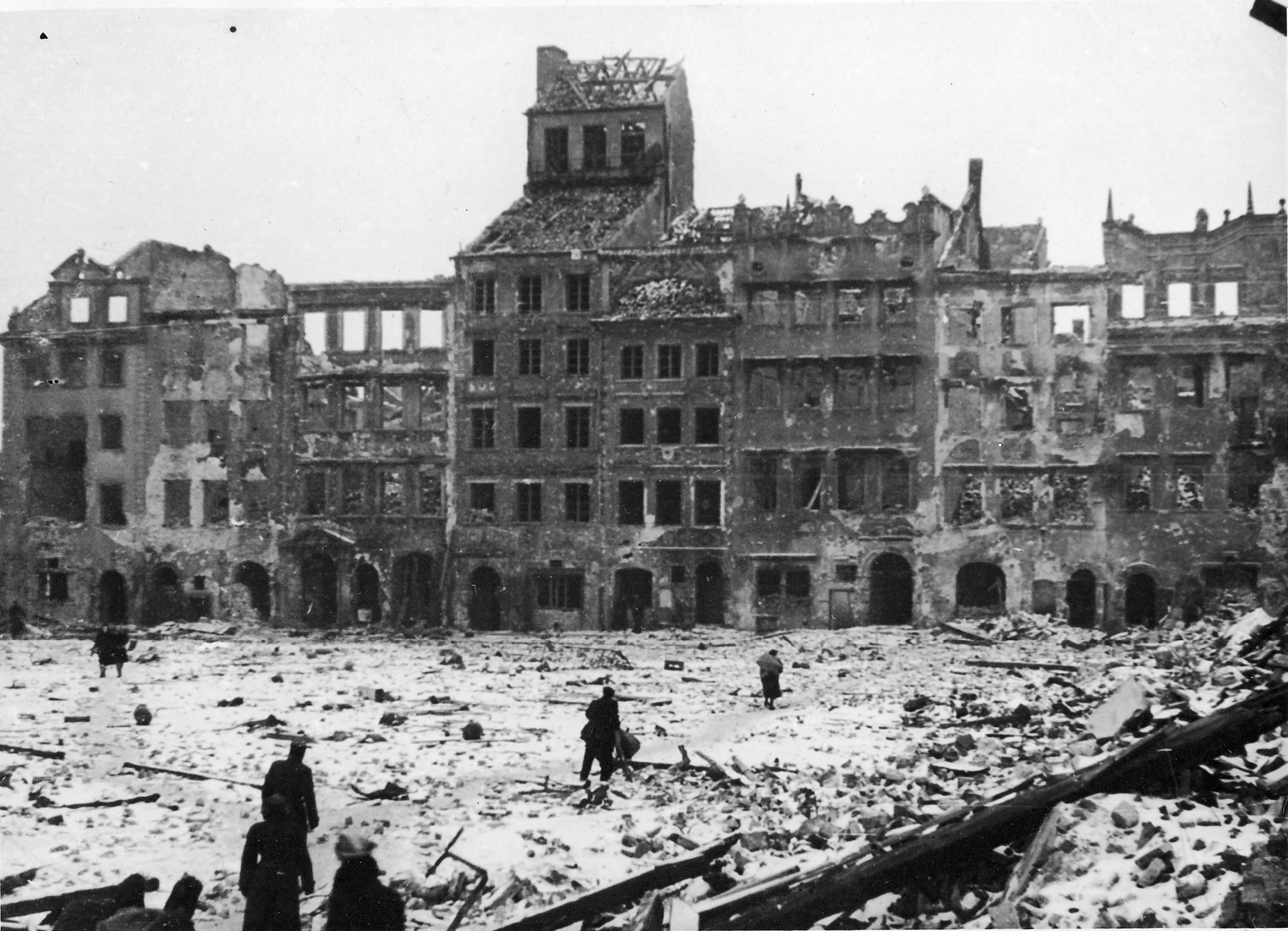
Warsaw Old Town marketplace, 1945

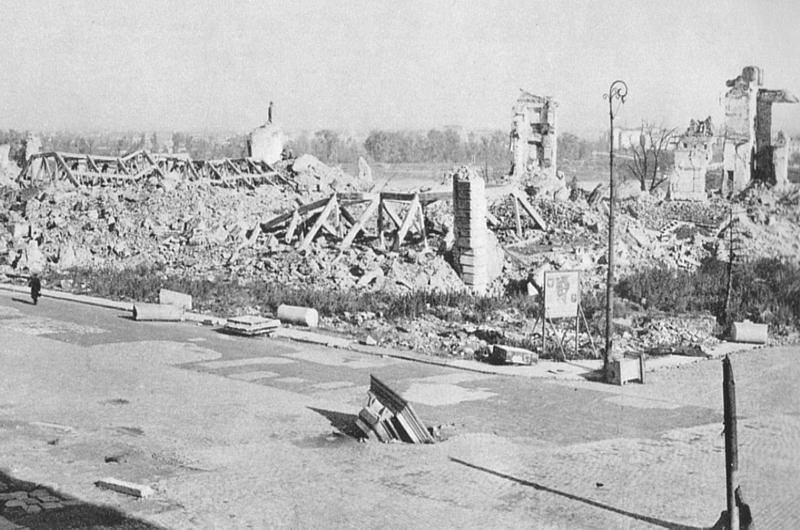
Royal Castle reduced to rubble

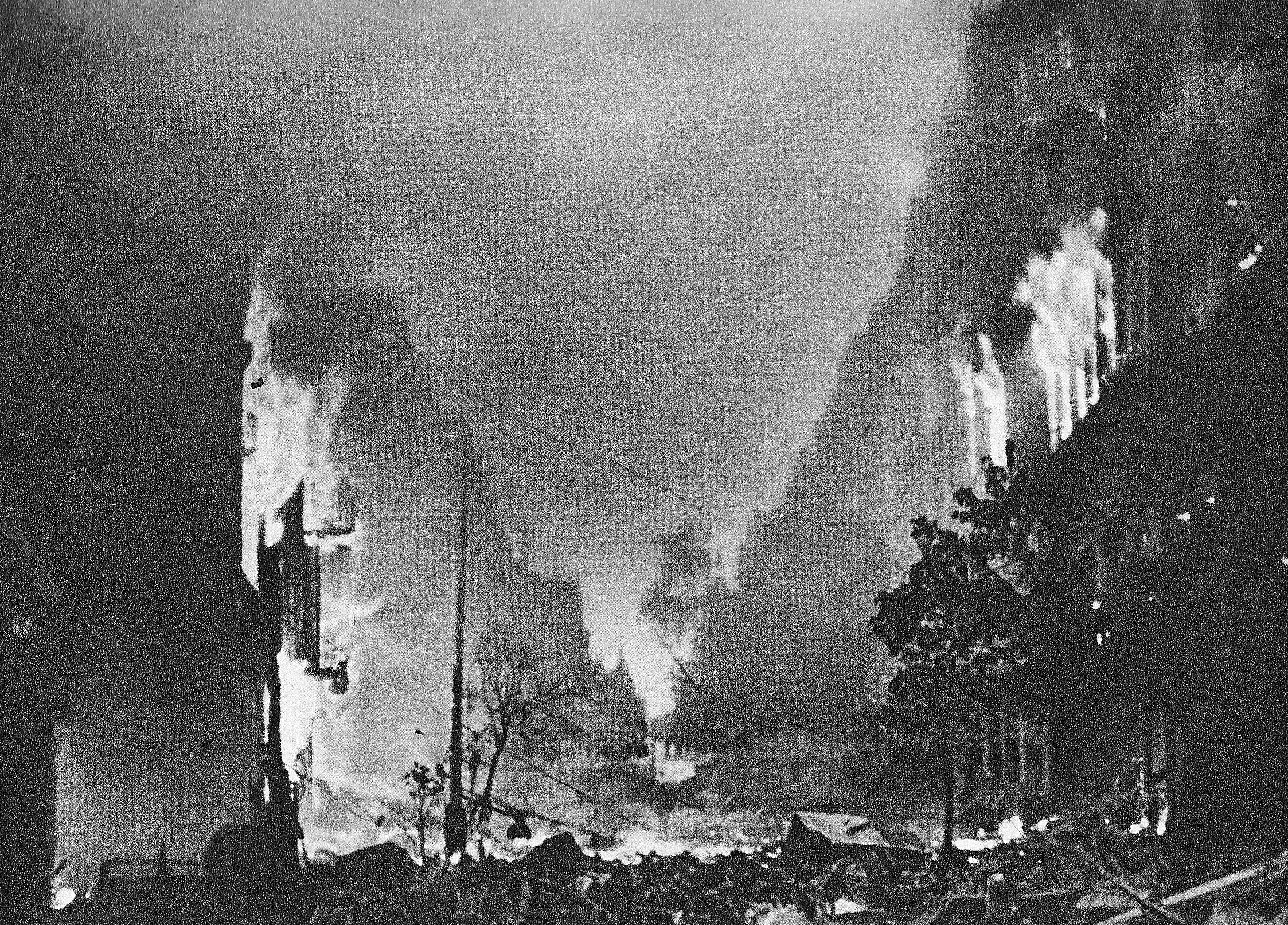
Marszałkowska Street in flames

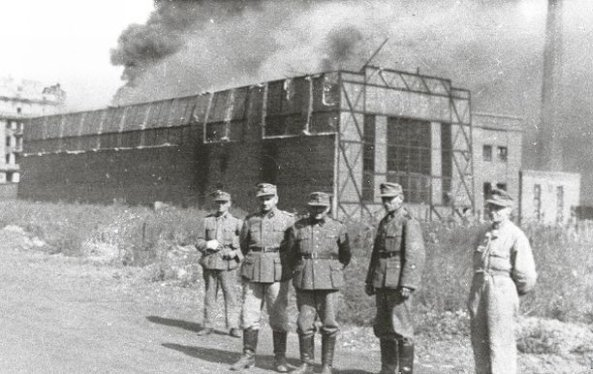
German soldiers in front of a burning Ursus factory

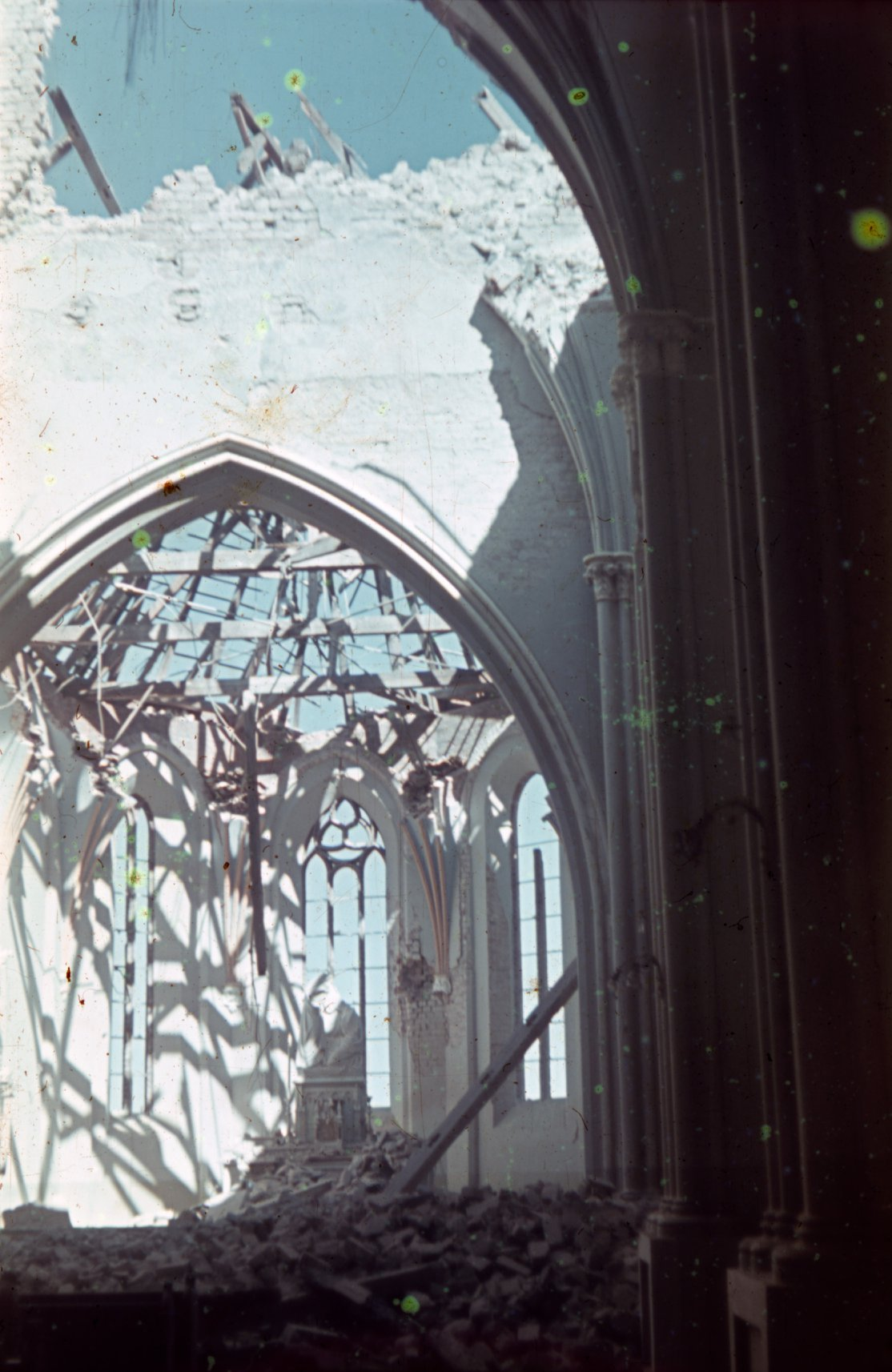
St. Mary's Church, destroyed in 1944

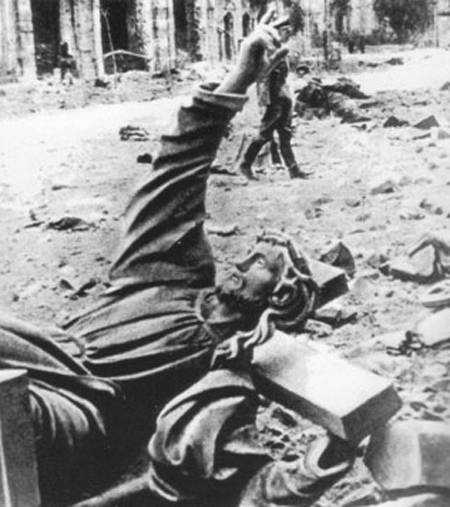
Statue of Jesus Christ from the Holy Cross Church

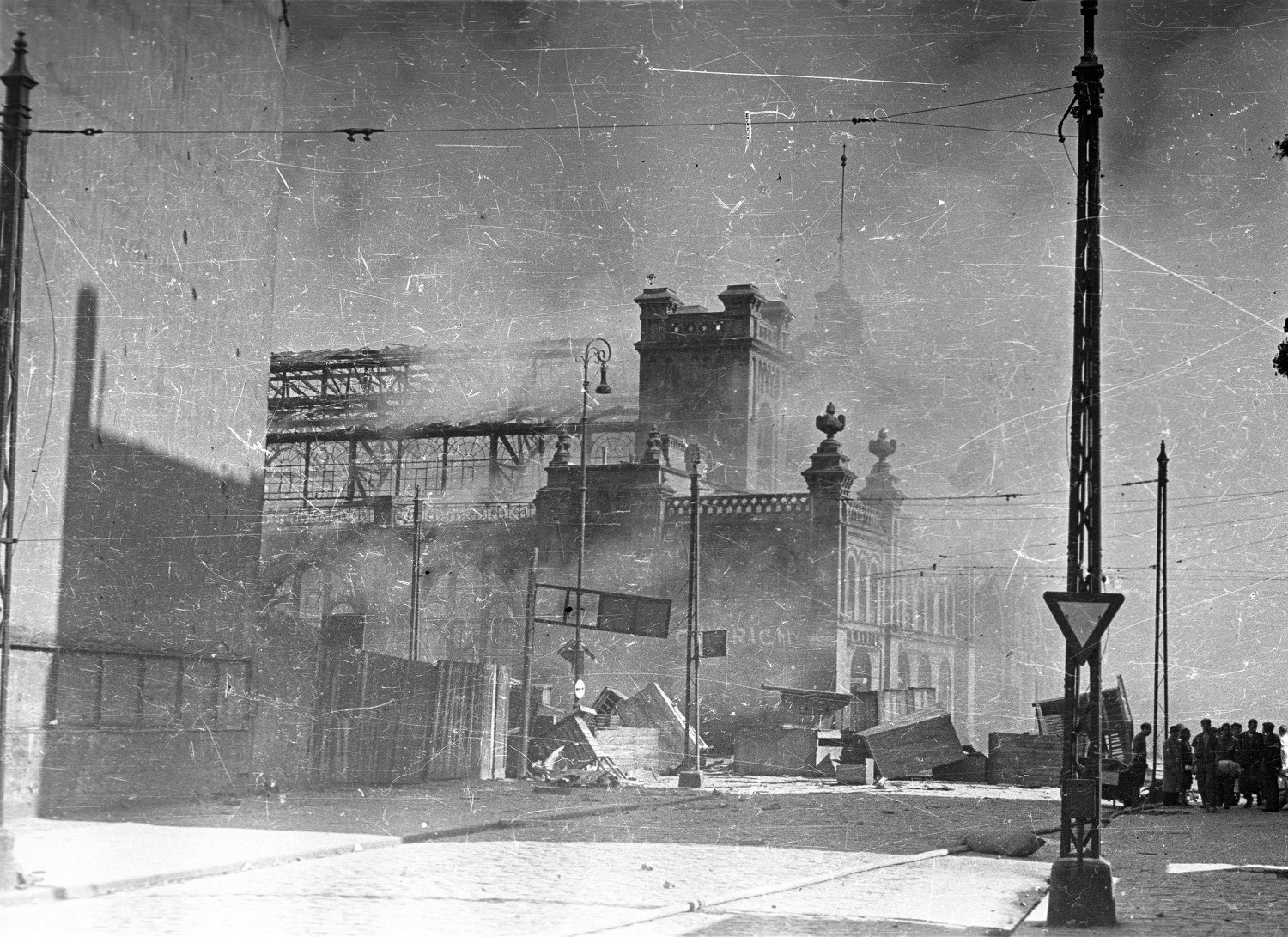
Mirów Halls in flames

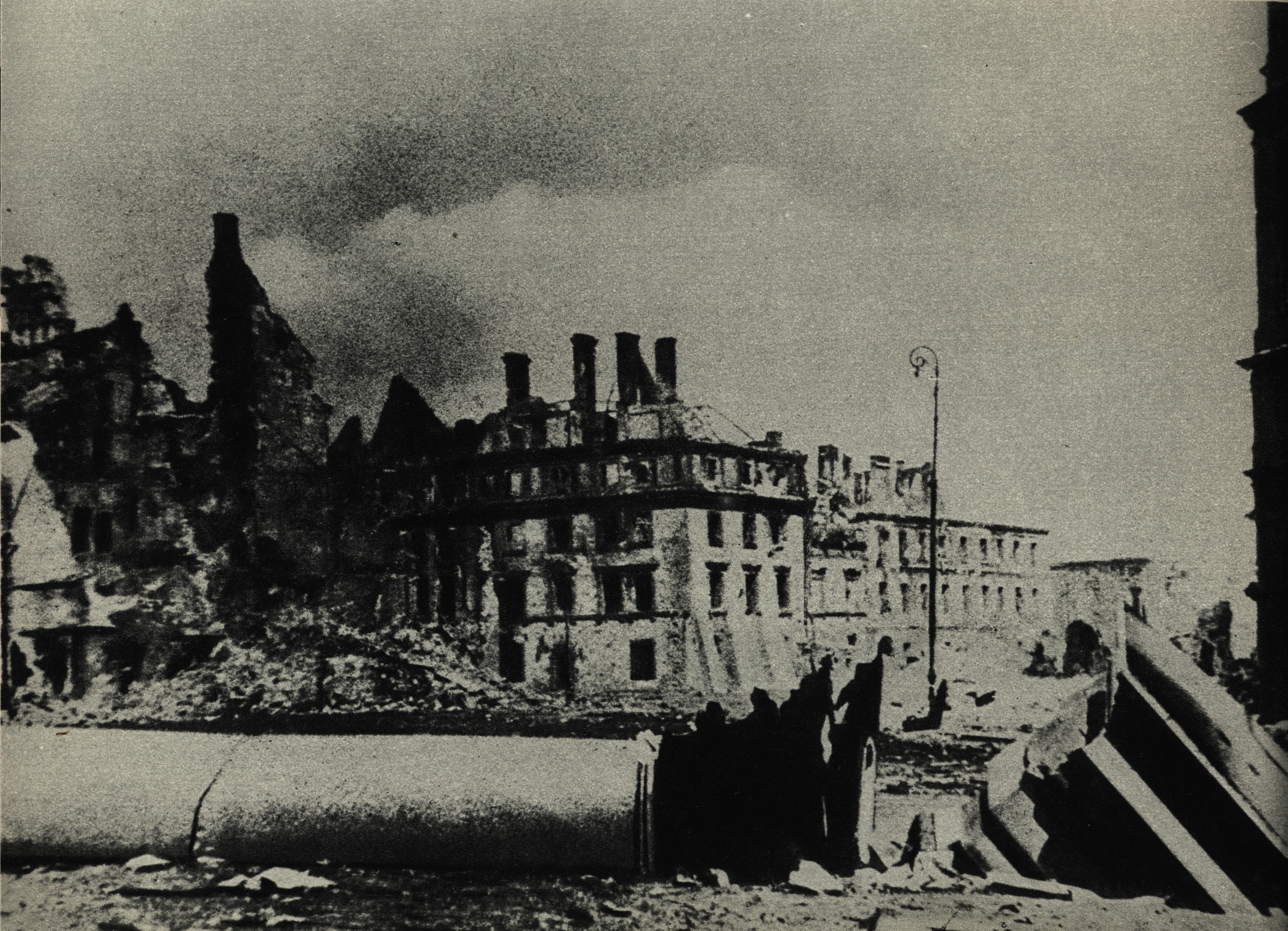
Sigismund's Column demolished by German tank shell

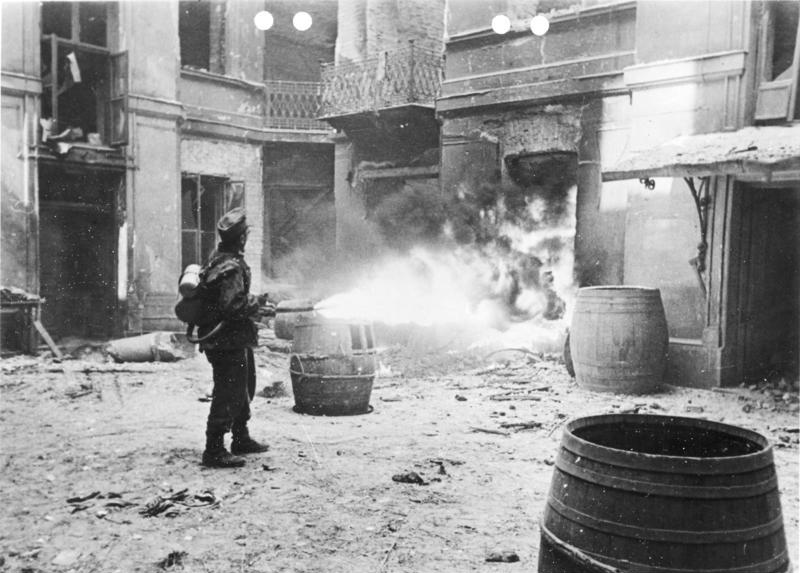
A German soldier sets fire to a building

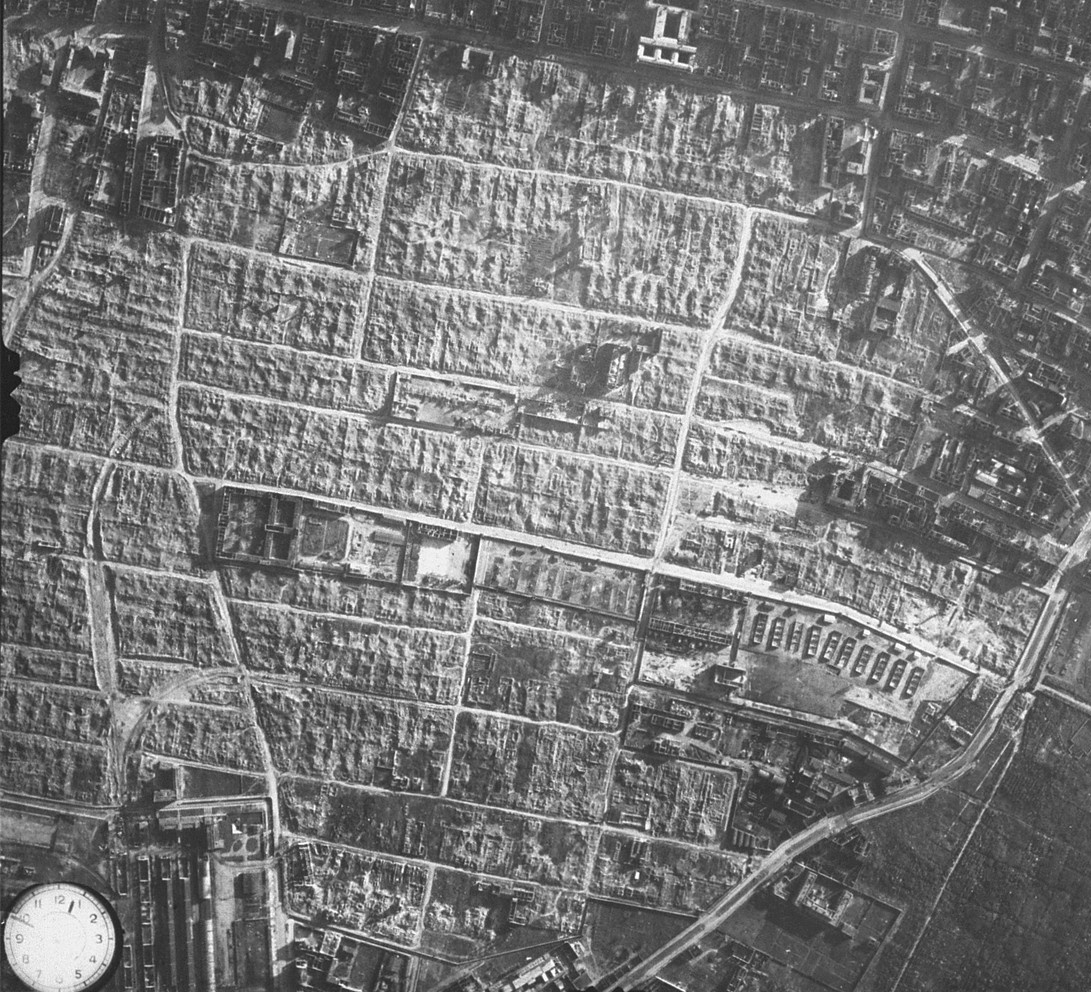
Aerial photograph of the destroyed Warsaw Ghetto

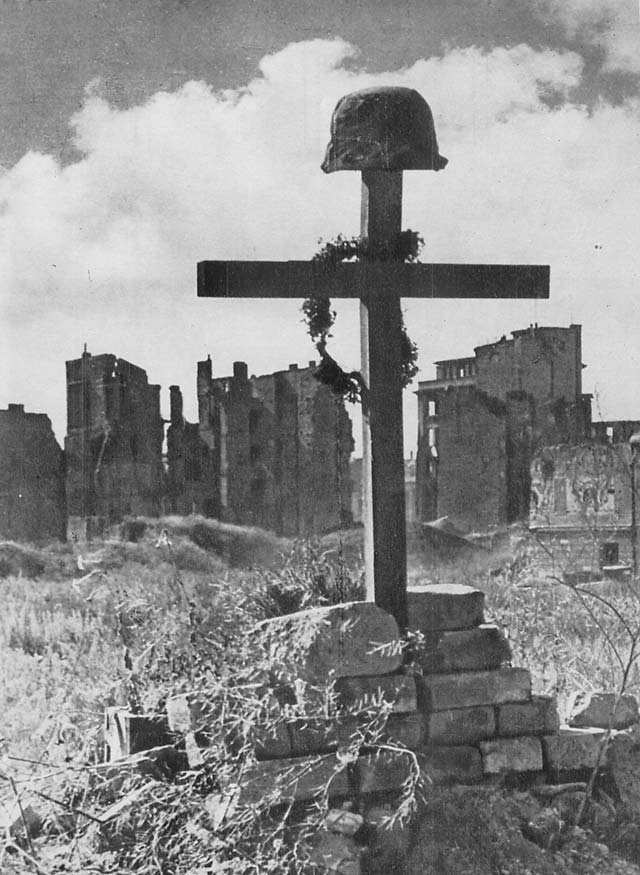
Polish soldier's grave before ruins on Wyjazd Street

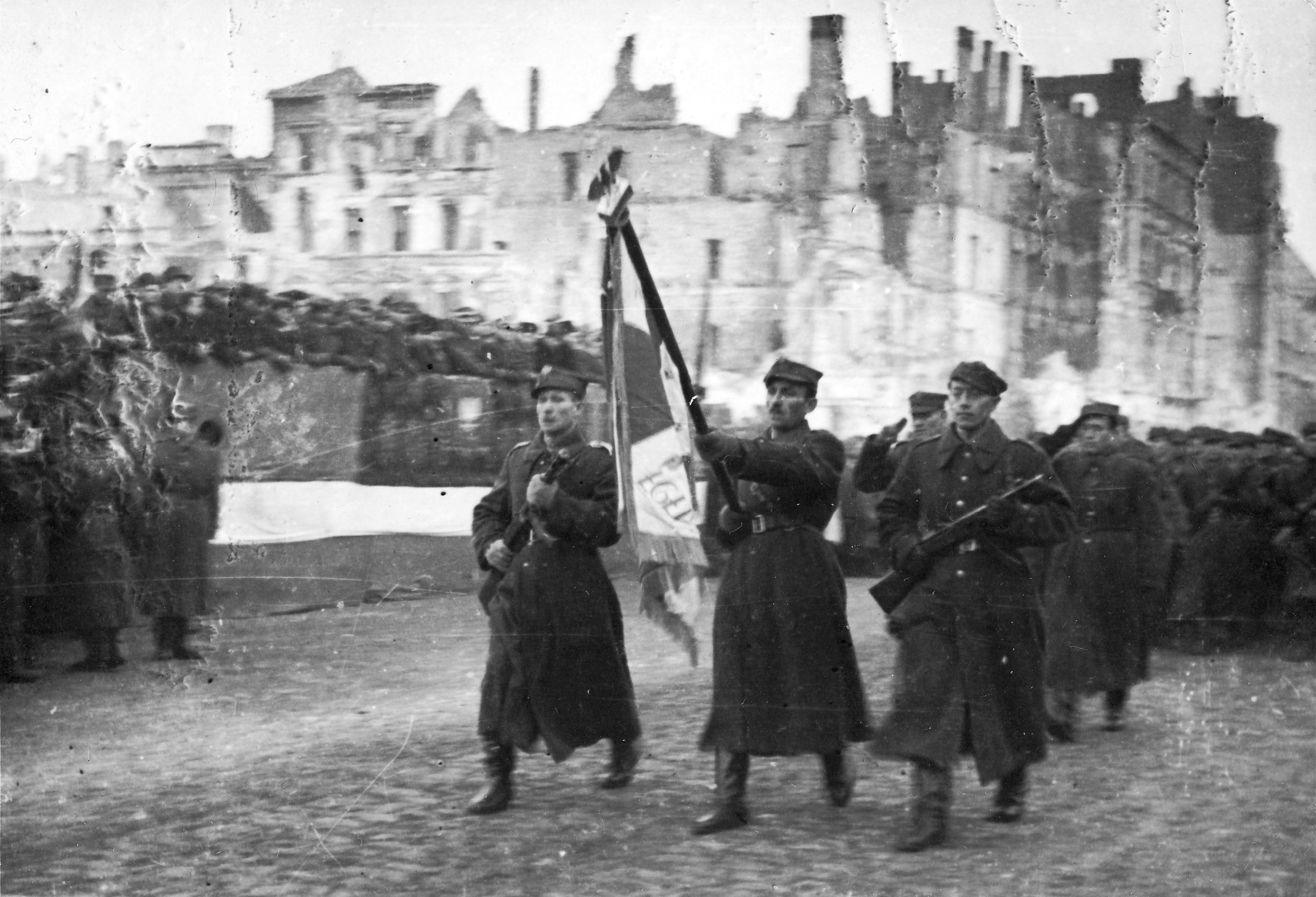
Parade of the First Polish Army on Marszałkowska Street

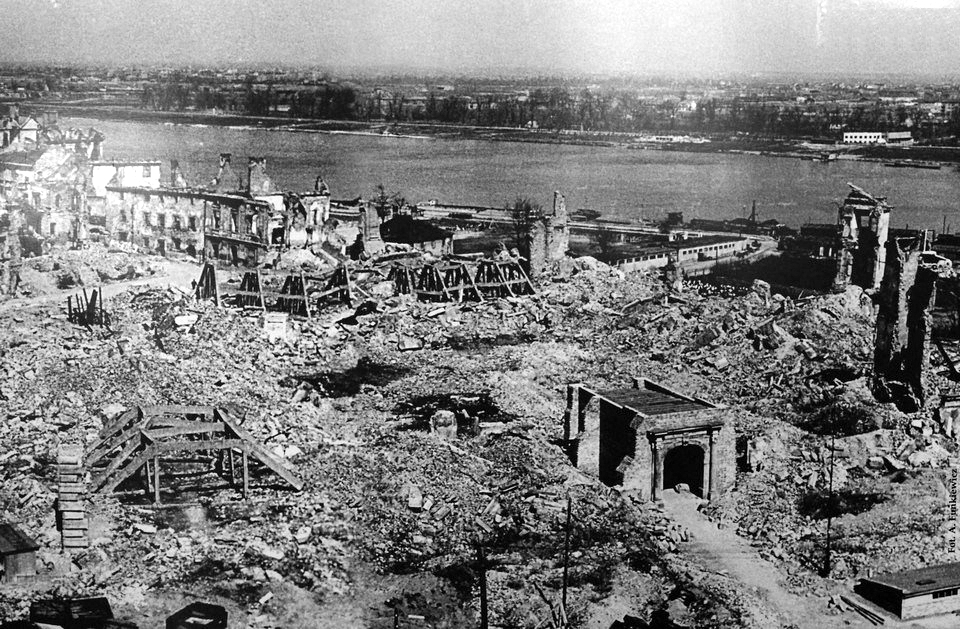
Royal Castle near the Vistula River (1948)

== Warsaw's rebuilding ==
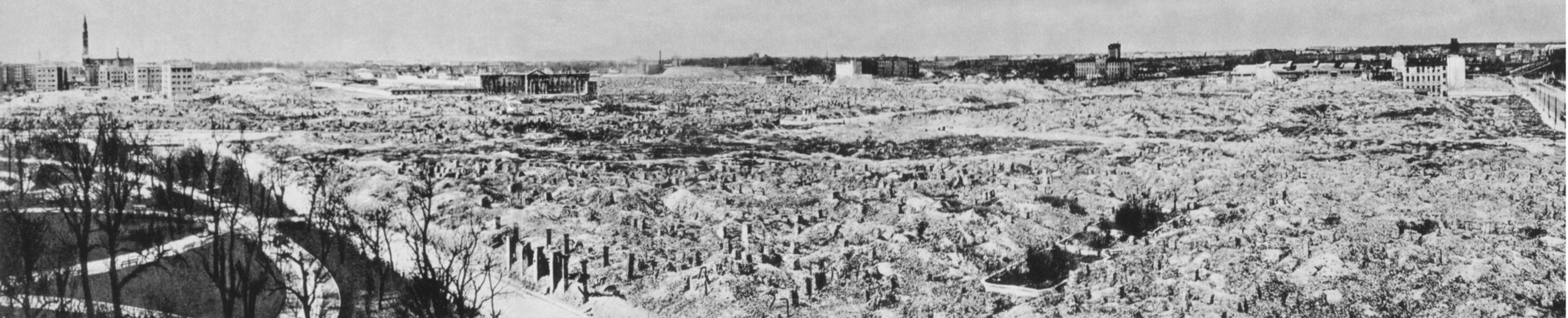
Section of Warsaw razed to the ground, photo c. 1950. Northwest view of the Krasiński Gardens and Świętojerska Street.

Even a decade after the German defeat, Warsaw continued to look like a completely destroyed city. Rebuilding the capital was a massive, multi-decade undertaking; the core of Warsaw was rebuilt between the 1950s and 1970s, though some major landmarks were reconstructed as late as the 1980s. While the Old Town has been thoroughly largely reconstructed to its pre-war appearance, the neighbouring New Town was only partially restored to its former state and continues to differ significantly from how it stood before the war. Despite these architectural efforts, countless historical buildings, artefacts, and landmarks were lost forever.

== See also ==
- Chronicles of Terror
- Dirlewanger Brigade
- Destruction of Kalisz
- List of libraries damaged during World War II
- List of Polish cities and towns damaged in World War II
- Nero Decree
- Domicide
- Scorched earth
- Warsaw Reconstruction Office

== Bibliography ==
- Ciborowski, Adolf (1969). Warsaw A City Destroyed and Rebuilt. Poland: Interpress Publishers. p. 328.
