= British Journal of Sports Medicine =

- Discipline: Sports medicine
- Language: English
- Edited by: Jonathan Drezner

Publication details
- History: 1966–present
- Publisher: BMJ Group
- Frequency: Semi-monthly
- Open access: Hybrid
- Impact factor: 15.5 (2024)

Standard abbreviations
- ISO 4: Br. J. Sports Med.

Indexing
- CODEN: BJSMDZ
- ISSN: 0306-3674 (print); 1473-0480 (web)
- OCLC no.: 890384547

Links
- Journal homepage; Online access; Online archive

The British Journal of Sports Medicine is a twice-monthly peer-reviewed medical journal covering sports science and sports medicine including sport physiotherapy. It is published by the BMJ Group. It was established in 1964 and the editor-in-chief from 2008 to 2020 was Karim M. Khan (University of British Columbia). Jonathan Drezner (University of Washington) has been editor-in-chief since 1 January 2021.

== Abstracting and indexing ==
According to the Journal Citation Reports, the journal has a 2024 impact factor of 16.2.

== International Olympic Committee consensus statements ==
Since 2009, the journal has partnered with the International Olympic Committee to produce regular consensus statements regarding important issues in sports injury prevention and elite sport. Some of the recent examples include Consensus Statements on concussions in sport (the "Berlin guidelines"), relative energy deficiency in sport, the relationship between training load and injury, mental health issues in athletes, and methods for injury and illness surveillance. These statements can assist in guiding clinicians.

== Controversies ==
In October 2018, over 170 academics signed a letter to the journal complaining after it ran an opinion piece by Aseem Malhotra. The group argued that the article made the "misleading and wrong" statement that saturated fat did not cause heart disease. Fiona Godlee, editor-in-chief of The BMJ, defended the journal's right to challenge "the status quo in some settings".

The IOC consensus statements are also not without controversy, with some writers accusing them of excessive conflict of interest. Another conflict of interest was raised by Pielke et al. about the accuracy of a study published in the journal later used in the drafting of IAAF regulations on permitted testosterone levels for female athletes.

A former editor, Paul McCrory, was found to have plagiarised one of more articles he wrote in the journal around 2005, forcing one retraction and public criticism of the governance of the journal during this period.
