= Pabst Plan =

Nazi plan to rebuild Warsaw as a smaller German town

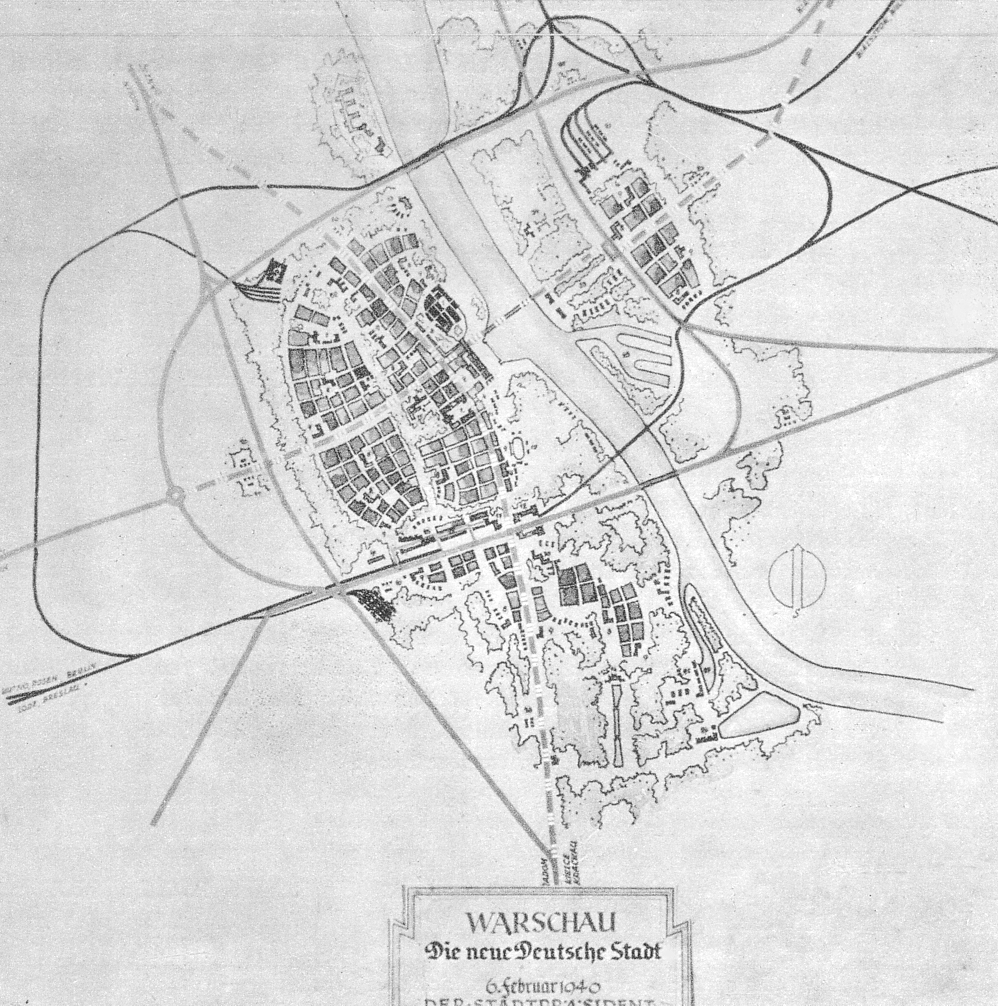
Map of the plan.

The Pabst Plan (German: Neue deutsche Stadt Warschau, lit. 'New German city of Warsaw') was an urban plan by Nazi Germany to systematically destroy and reconstruct the city of Warsaw as a Nazi model city. Named after its creator Friedrich Pabst, the Nazis' "Chief Architect for Warsaw", the plan dictated that the historical capital of Poland, a city of 1.3 million inhabitants at the time, would be completely destroyed. Stripped of all Polish cultural elements, the area was to be rebuilt after a total German victory in the war as a small provincial town housing no more than 130,000 German citizens. It was designed to serve as a major transportation hub and the administrative seat for the German ruling class of the occupied Polish territories, featuring a massive Parteivolkshalle ("People's Party Hall") built directly in place of the Royal Castle in Warsaw.

In modern historical works, the term is used broadly to denote any of the German World War II blueprints concerning the destruction and replacement of Warsaw. Specifically, it refers to a pair of distinct proposals: an initial layout prepared by Hubert Gross and Otto Nurnberger in 1940, and a later refinement prepared by Pabst himself in 1942. Both of these structural plans explicitly envisioned the deliberate obliteration of the vast majority of Warsaw, including its historical Polish monuments and native residential neighborhoods. While these long-term colonial reconstruction projects were never realized, the core intent was executed following the 1944 Warsaw Uprising, when the retreating German forces decided to simply destroy the city in its entirety, including the castle, as a final act of vengeance.

== History ==
=== Pre-war planning ===
The destruction of the city was already planned long before its almost total destruction in 1944, even prior to the start of World War II. On 20 June 1939, while Adolf Hitler was visiting an architectural bureau in Würzburg, his attention was captured by a project to create a future "German" town—Warsaw (German: Warschau, Polish: Warszawa), which later became known as the Pabst Plan. Friedrich Pabst prepared a technical plan for the annihilation of Warsaw and the complete ethnic cleansing of its native Polish population, with Polish Jews condemned to be the first destined for extermination. It envisaged the transformation of the Polish capital into a new, provincial German town, containing an exclusively ethnic German population of no more than 130,000 people on the left bank supported by a slave labour camp of 80,000 Poles on the right bank of the Vistula. Warsaw's total population in 1935 was around 1.3 million, consisting of Poles, Jews, and other minorities, which meant that putting the new urbanization plan to work would require the complete removal of its entire population. The project included 15 separate plans and photos, and solid pre-build documentation. Among all the pages of the project the most important is a colored plan of the future town which was created by German architects in 1:20 000 scale titled Die neue deutsche Stadt Warschau (Warsaw, the New German City). The final table bore the caption Der Abbau der Polenstadt und der Aufbau der Deutschen Stadt (The Destruction of the Polish City and the Construction of the German City).

Some parts of the project that were showing Warsaw's urban development from the second half of the 17th century until the year 1935 were based on Polish documentation from 1935 and presumably on scientific sources prepared for Warsaw’s Territorial Development of Communication and Transportation by Prof. O. Sosnowski. All these sources were skillfully extracted long before the war. At an early stage, thanks to German deception based on the false pretense of doing scientific research, the German planners concealed the hidden agenda necessary for creating such a plan. German scholars, historians, conservators and professors of architecture, and other experts were enlisted to catalogue all of the most important and culturally significant landmarks of the city, the most exquisite churches and public buildings, and key library collections, artworks, and sculptures.

The "German Varsavia" was planned to be a built on the crossroad of German highways and railroad networks. It covered a 6 km² built-up area plus 1 km² of Warsaw's centuries-old Prague district, for a combined 7 km² area, with parks and green areas bringing to a total of 15 km². The 7 km² of buildings was just 1/20 of the existing Polish capital city and was very different from the actual existing road network of 1939. The whole town center was to be built into a net of narrow, picturesque streets, resembling the planning of a typical German town. The modern and wide Polish capital avenues (like Marszałkowska, Twarda, Mokotowska, Dzika, Oś Saska, Oś Stanisławowska) would have been erased forever with all their monumental and beautiful buildings and palaces. Only the remains of the Old Town district (without the Polish King's Castle), the King's Baths Palace (Polish: Łazienki Królewskie), and Belvedere (Polish: Belweder), and modified parts of the Vistula riverside buildings would have been saved.

=== Wartime implementation of the plan ===
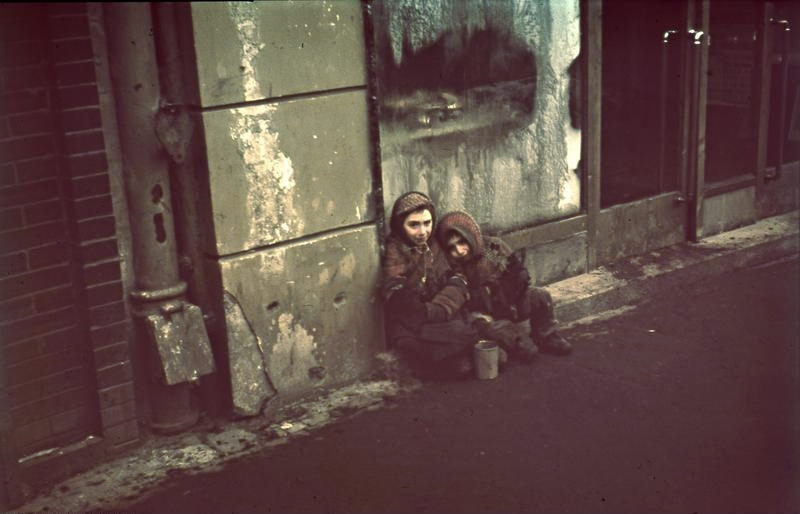
Ghetto children

After the start of military operations and the fall of the capital into German hands the project was updated, incorporating the city's partial destruction in the September offensive of 1939. The project was soon to be included as a part of the overall Germanization plan of the East, the genocidal Generalplan Ost.

On October 8, 1939 western areas of Poland were annexed by the Third Reich, and on October 12, 1939 the central areas of Poland were incorporated into the General Government by Hitler's decrees. The capital of the Gubernia was placed in Kraków (Krakau, Cracow) for security reasons. The occupying German elite was afraid of unsubdued Warsaw.

The plan was to be implemented in several stages. One of the parts for the plan, the "Demolition of the Polish City and the Construction of the German City" (Abbau der Polen-Stadt und der Aufbau der Deutschen Stadt) included a list of the Polish capital's centers of life destined for destruction, put in chronological order based on planned liquidation date. The planners also decided to use the destruction caused by bombings and fires during the September 1939 seizure of the city as a pretext for the urbanistic changes. Another part of the plan included a detailed map of the anticipated destruction showing almost all buildings destroyed coincidentally according to the original plan. In reality only 10 percent of the buildings were destroyed in 1939, with total civilian and military losses of around 12,000 killed and 66,000 wounded.

In the "Small Plan" (Kleine Planung), the population of Warsaw was to be limited to 500,000 people. The first group affected by this measure was Warsaw's Jewish population, which the German planners assumed would be removed (Judenaussiedlung) from an area of around 482 hm² and forcibly relocated to a "Jewish Quarter" (Judenviertel) which was only 30% the size, i.e., 143 hm² surrounded by walls and watchtowers. In 1940, the Nazis turned the northern part of mid-town Warsaw (Wola and Muranow) into a Jewish ghetto. The Jewish Ghetto was planned to accommodate around 30,000 of the capital's inhabitants that were of Jewish origin; however it eventually held nearly 400,000 people living in deplorable conditions. The next step for decreasing the original population of the city was the systematic displacement of people captured and destined for either slave labor in the Third Reich or extermination in concentration and labor camps. As early as 1940 all inhabitants of Warsaw were subject to round-ups (łapanki) and mass shootings in the streets. Nearly 250,000 civilians were eventually murdered this way. Memorial plaques can be seen throughout Warsaw today commemorating this indiscriminate program of ethnic cleansing of men, women and children. Those who did not manage to escape were sent to death camps at Auschwitz or Majdanek or forced into labour in Germany. Among the 2,857,500 Poles working as slave labor in the Third Reich during World War II, a significant percentage was composed of Warsaw and Warsaw province inhabitants.

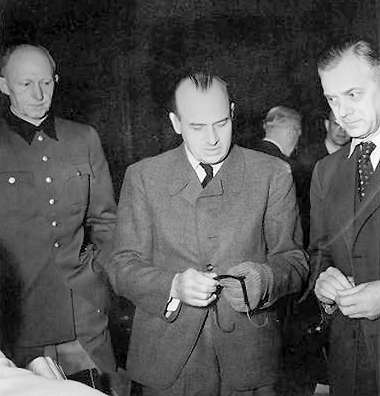
Hans Frank (center, wearing a glove after a suicide attempt shortly after his arrest) at the Nuremberg trial, with Alfred Jodl and Alfred Rosenberg

On 6 February 1940 the German mayor of the city presented an unusual gift to Hans Frank, the Governor-General of the Occupied Polish Territories. The gift was a full documentation of the new German town Warsaw (Neue deutsche Stadt Warschau), the so-called Pabst Plan, prepared by German architects Hubert Gross and Otto Nurnberger.

From July 1943 to July 1944, prisoners from the Warsaw concentration camp were tasked with clearing 2.6 million cubic meters of rubble, in order to convert the former Warsaw Ghetto into a park.

== See also ==
- Planned destruction of Warsaw
- Nazi architecture
- Welthauptstadt Germania
- Chronicles of Terror

== Bibliography ==
- Stanisław Jankowski, Adolf Ciborowski "Warszawa 1945 i dziś" Publisher: Wydawnictwo Interpress, Warszawa, 1971,
- Niels Gutschow, Barbara Klain, "Zagłada i utopia. Urbanistyka Warszawy w latach 1939-1945" (katalog wystawy), Muzeum Historyczne, Warszawa 2003
- Niels Gutschow, Barbarta Klain: Vernichtung und Utopie. Stadtplanung Warschau 1939–1945, Hamburg 1994, ISBN 3-88506-223-2
