= Mary Jo Fisher =

Australian politician (born 1962)

Senator for South Australia
- In office 6 June 2007 – 14 August 2012
- Preceded by: Amanda Vanstone
- Succeeded by: Anne Ruston

Personal details
- Born: 25 December 1962 (age 63) Beverley, Western Australia
- Party: Liberal
- Spouse: John Crosby
- Education: University of Western Australia (LLB)
- Profession: Barrister

Mary Josephine Fisher (born 25 December 1962) is an Australian former politician. She was a Liberal member of the Australian Senate from June 2007, representing the state of South Australia, but resigned in August 2012, after twice being charged with shoplifting.

== Life ==
Fisher was born in the Western Australian town of Beverley. She is a great-granddaughter of George Miles, a long-serving former member of the Western Australian Legislative Council, and a niece of former Nuclear Disarmament Party and Greens WA Senator Jo Vallentine. She worked as a barrister and specialist in industrial relations before the start of her political career. She subsequently served as a senior adviser to the then Industrial Relations Minister, Peter Reith. At the time of her selection, Fisher was General Manager of Business Services for Business SA.

Mary-Jo Fisher is married to South Australian businessman, John Crosby.

== Political career ==
Fisher was chosen on 6 June 2007 to fill a vacancy in the Australian Senate caused by the resignation of the Hon. Amanda Vanstone. This preselection was the subject of an internal party appeal by fellow candidate Maria Kourtesis. On 5 June 2007 the appeals tribunal set up by the SA Liberal Party dismissed Mrs Kourtesis appeal in a 4–1 vote. A joint sitting of the Parliament of South Australia officially nominated Fisher as a senator on 6 June 2007. Fisher was sworn in as a South Australian Senator on 12 June. Maria Kourtesis remained fourth on the SA Liberal Party Senate ticket for the 2007 election.

Fisher served on the Senate's Environment, Communications, Information Technology and the Arts committee, and was a member of the Education, Employment and Workplace Relations, and Legal and Constitutional Affairs Standing committees. She is the former Chair of the Senate Select Committee on the National Broadband Network, and she also served as the Chair of the Senate Standing Environment and Communications References Committee.

Fisher made headlines in March 2011 when she mocked Prime Minister Julia Gillard by dancing the Hokey Pokey and the Time Warp in the Australian Senate during a speech arguing against the Government's climate change policy.

== First shoplifting charge ==
In July 2011, it was revealed that Fisher had been charged with shoplifting and the alleged assault of a security guard at an Adelaide supermarket in December 2010. Fisher said she would vigorously defend the claims. If convicted on either charge, Fisher would have lost her seat in the Senate. Senator Fisher's defence was that she was suffering from depression and a severe panic attack at the time of the offence. On 18 November, magistrate Kym Boxall cleared Fisher of shoplifting charges, but found her guilty of assault, although no conviction was recorded and no penalty was imposed.

== Second shoplifting charge and resignation ==
On 21 June 2012, ABC News announced that police had confirmed Fisher had been involved in a second shoplifting incident, and she would resign from Parliament on 10 August 2012. She said she was still trying to recover from her depressive illness and continuing to serve in public office would not be conducive to her recovery. On 10 August she delayed her resignation until 14 August. She pleaded guilty to shoplifting goods to the value of $73.62 from a Coles supermarket in West Lakes. No conviction was recorded but she was given a two-year good behaviour bond.

In February 2013 it was reported that the Police Complaints Authority (PCA) had launched an investigation into the prosecution of Fisher, in particular the actions of senior police in overruling prosecutor advice not to pursue the case. The matter was referred to the PCA by John Rau the South Australian Attorney-General after receiving a letter from Fisher's husband, John Crosby.
