= William Bruce (diplomat) =

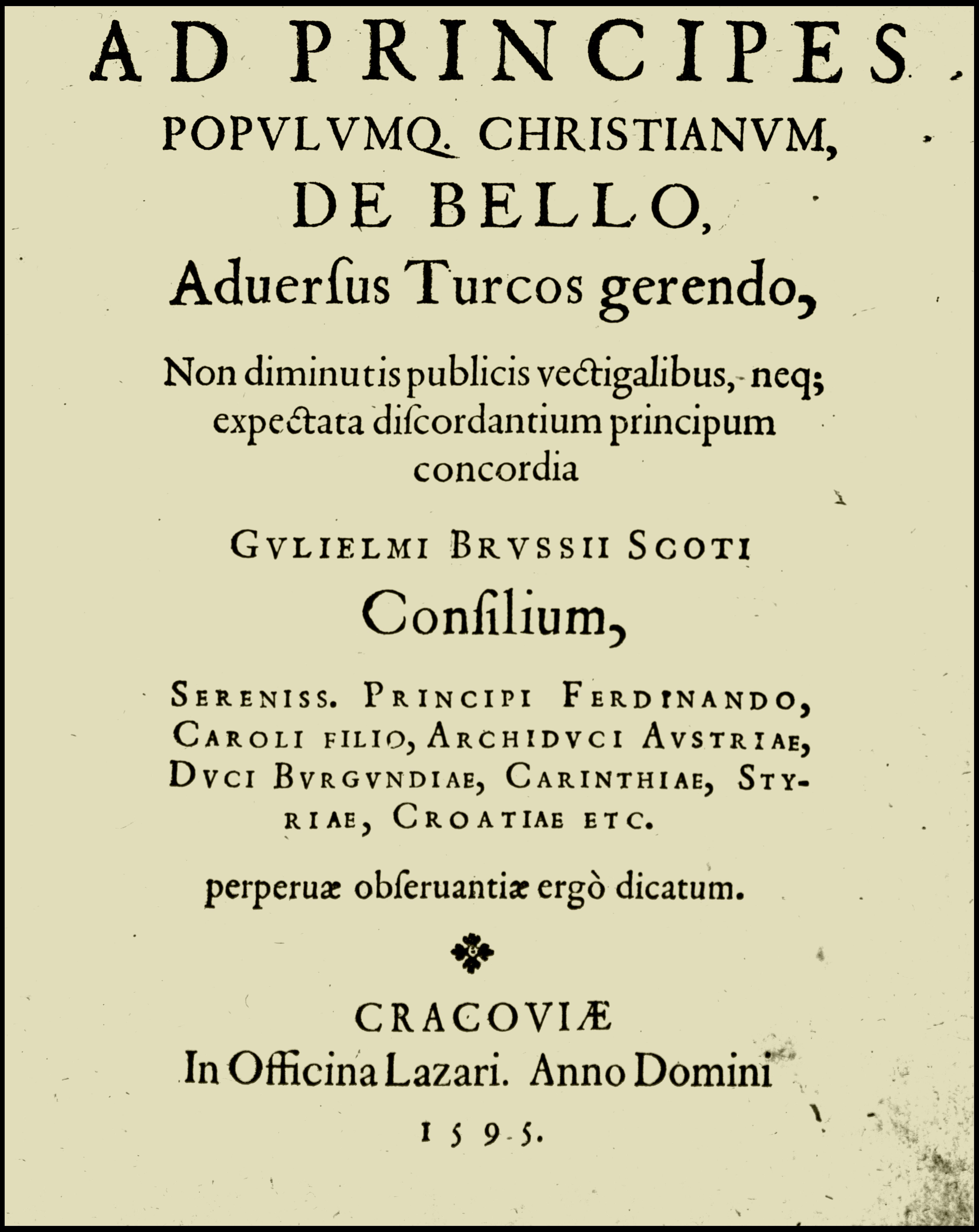
Title page of Ad Principes Populumque Christianum (Kraków, 1595)

William Bruce (c. 1560–1610) was a Scottish professor and lecturer at the Zamoyski Academy in Zamość in Poland, a merchant representative, author, and the diplomatic agent of King James VI and I in Poland 1605–1609.

== Career ==
Bruce was born at Stanstill in Bower, near Wick, Caithness. He graduated as a doctor of Roman Law at the university of Cahors in France in 1586. He was for time a soldier in Polish service, then was appointed as a Professor of Law by Jan Zamoyski at the new Academy of Zamość. He joined an embassy to the court of Elizabeth I in 1600, and returned to Scotland for a time in 1602.

After the Union of the Crowns, King James sent him as a diplomatic agent to Poland in May 1604 with a yearly allowance of £100.

Bruce sent letters with Polish news to Robert Cecil, 1st Earl of Salisbury and King James. King James was displeased by the composition and appearance of Bruce's letters, which, according to Thomas Lake, he considered an "unreverent form of writing". Bruce was an ally of the Danish diplomat Henrik Ramel, but Ramel was not welcomed in Poland. In May 1607, Bruce reported that Scottish merchants exported money to invest at Baltic ports, which was forbidden. In July 1607, he described the battle of Guzów and wrote that Lord Herbert was wounded and captive at Kraków.

In 1608, Bruce was involved in a scheme to send a portrait of Władysław IV Vasa to Anne of Denmark, the queen consort of King James, intended as a preliminary to discussions for his marriage with Princess Elizabeth. He also sent miniature portraits of King James enchased in amber to Anne of Denmark and her family, and her lady in waiting Jane Drummond.

His diplomatic role in Poland came to an end in 1609 when James Sandilands arrived as ambassador in 1609, and Patrick Gordon become the royal agent. Thereafter Bruce continued in Gdańsk as an arbitrator in international trade. Some of his correspondence survives in The National Archive and Cecil papers, and his journal is held in the State Archives in Gdańsk.

Bruce's last known letter was written in October 1609. A letter dated 29 August 1610 mentions that Bruce had died.

== Works ==
- Ad Principes Populumq(ue) Christianum De Bello Adversus Turcos gerendo, Kraków 1595, and Leipzig 1595.
- De Tartaris diarium. Ad Illustrem Georgium Talbottum Anglum Serenissimi et optimi Principis Guilielmi, Comitis Palatini Rheni, utriusque Bavariae Ducis et familiarem, Frankfurt: Apud heredes Andreae Wecheli, Claudium Marnium, et Joan. Aubrium, 1598, a historical account of Crimea.

Modern scholars conclude that Bruce was not the author of the Relation of the State of Polonia and the United Provinces, and, on the basis of a recently discovered second manuscript, the work has been conclusively shown by Sebastian Sobecki to have been composed by his contemporary John Peyton.
