= Henrik Ramel =

Danish politician and ambassador

Henrik Ramel or Ramelius (c. 1550–1610) was a Danish politician, ambassador, and member of the council of regents.

== Career ==
He was the son of a Pomeranian nobleman Gert Ramel and Margrethe Massow. After study in Padua in 1568, and travel in Europe and Asia, he entered the service of the Polish King Stephen Báthory and then of Duke Johan Frederik of Pomerania. But he, like the noble Mecklenburg Belou family, joined the service of Denmark in 1581, where a Mecklenburg princess, Sophie of Mecklenburg-Güstrow was Frederick II's queen.

Ramel was secretary of the German Chancery, and attended ambassadors to Denmark. The English diplomat Daniel Rogers described him as the young king's overseer and steward, and a chief counsellor to Sophie, and the mouthpiece of the four governors. In August 1582, at Kronborg, he received letters from an English ambassador Peregrine Bertie, 13th Baron Willoughby de Eresby as Frederick II's chancellor for Germany.

=== Embassy to Scotland ===
Henrik Ramel, Manderup Parsberg, Henrik Belou and Nicolaus Theophilus were ambassadors to Scotland in 1585. James VI appointed Sir James Melville of Halhill, William Schaw, and the Laird of Segie to be their companions. Melville described the events of the embassy. At Dunfermline Palace they discussed the disputed ownership of the Orkney Islands. It was also rumoured they discussed the king's marriage. They were not treated in the usual manner but had to pay their own expenses, and when they were to travel to St Andrews the promised horses were late. At St Andrews they suffered some abuse organised by supporters of the pro-French faction. A leading courtier, James Stewart, Earl of Arran, who had served in Sweden was a ringleader. The English ambassador Edward Wotton helped them because England and Denmark were allies, and told them privately that James VI had criticised Danish customs and their king Frederick II. According to Melville, the Danish envoys considered leaving Scotland, but he persuaded them to continue and spoke to James VI in their favour. When the mission was concluded, the ambassadors were supposed to receive gifts of gold chains but these were not ready. The town council of Edinburgh sent letters asking that the ambassadors should be given better treatment.

Ramel came to England in May 1586, and wrote of his arrival at Greenwich to Francis Walsingham. He asked Walsingham to make his introduction at court. He heard a petition from English merchants about the Sound Toll. An account of his embassy was included in Raphael Holinshed's Chronicles. He was lodged at Crosbie's Place in Bishopsgate, and travelled to Elizabeth's court at Greenwich Palace by river.

In July 1590, Ramel met the Scottish ambassador John Skene at Hamburg, and on 24 July Skene and his company dined with Ramel and his wife Abel Rantzau at Haderslev.

In 1597, he was sent to Joachim Frederick, Elector of Brandenburg to arrange the marriage of Christian IV to Anna Cathrine and signed the marriage contract. In August 1598 he wrote a letter of courtesy to James VI in response to a Scottish embassy which had requested a promise of military support to James in the event of the death of Elizabeth I of England.

=== Missions to England ===
Ramel came to London in January 1605 and during the visit of Anna of Denmark's brother, the Duke of Holstein, he was lodged at Denmark House on the Strand. He accepted the Order of the Garter for Christian IV in September. He left in October, after raising the issue of Orkney. Orkney had been part of the dowry of Margaret of Denmark, Queen of Scotland, wife of James II of Scotland. Denmark now wished to redeem the islands with a cash payment. He received no answer on this question.

He was in London again during the visit of Christian IV in June 1606, and King James gave him a gift of silver gilt plate.

In May 1607 he came to Gdańsk and spoke to the resident British diplomat Dr William Bruce, hoping for English support.

He died in 1610.

== Marriages ==
James VI of Scotland and Anne of Denmark attended the wedding of Henrik Ramel and Abel Rantzau (d. 1596) at Kronborg on 1 February 1590, and gave the bride 6 gold rose nobles. Daniel Rogers said the marriage was planned by Frederick II to link Ramel firmly to Danish interest. Some sources place the wedding in February 1589. They had a son in 1590.

In 1599 he married Else Henriksdatter Brahe (d. 1619), daughter of Henrik Brahe.
