= Karim M. Khan =

Canadian/Australian sport and exercise medicine physician

Karim M. Khan AO
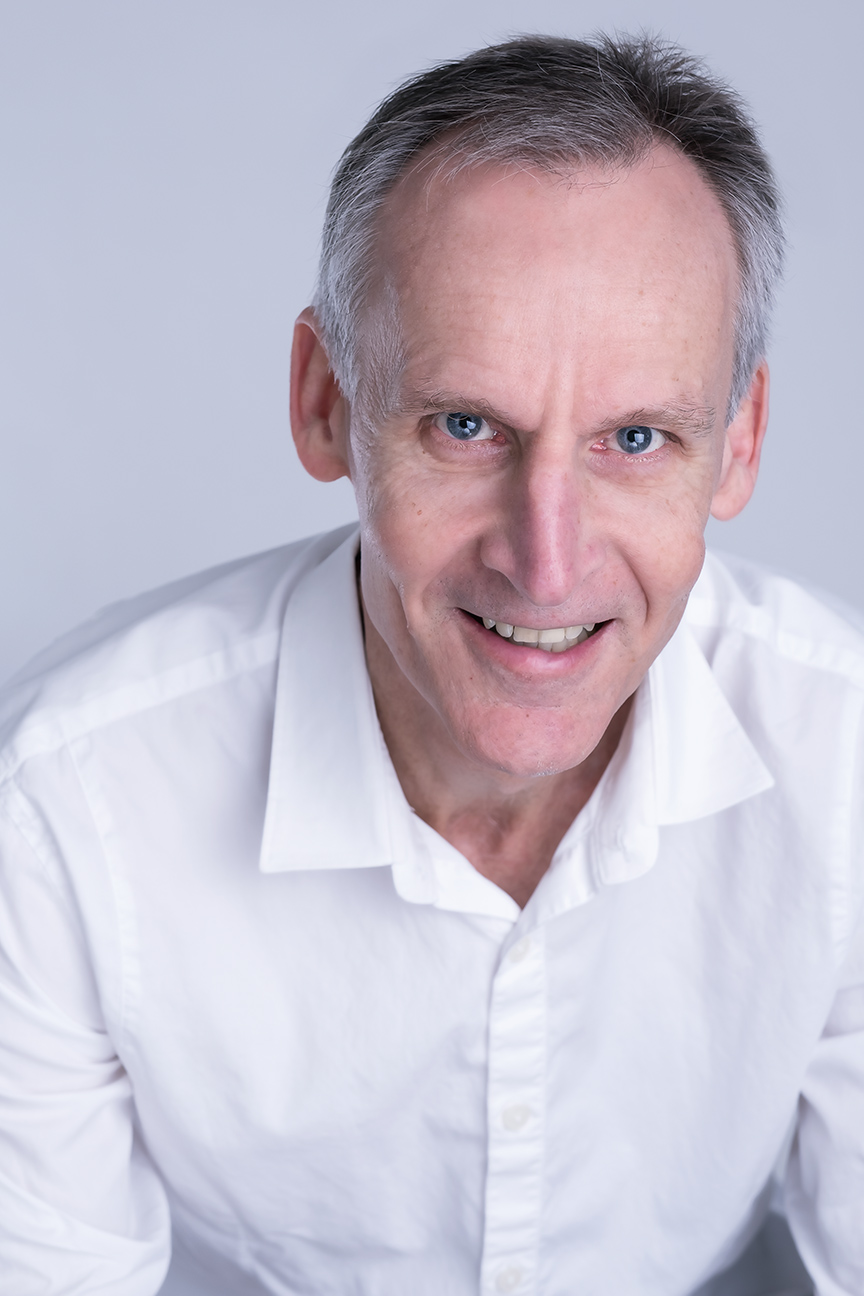
- Born: Karim Achmed Miran-Khan; November 23, 1960; Eckernfoerde, Germany
- Citizenship: Australian and Canadian
- Education: University of Melbourne; University of British Columbia
- Medical career
- Profession: Sports and exercise physician, academic
- Institutions: University of British Columbia

Karim M. Khan AO is a professor and former sport and exercise medicine physician who served as editor in chief of the British Journal of Sports Medicine from 2008-2020. He was awarded the Officer of the Order of Australia in 2019 for "distinguished service to sport and exercise medicine and to the promotion of physical activity for community health" and an Honorary Fellowship of the Faculty of Sport and Exercise Medicine (UK) in 2014. He was awarded an Honorary Doctorate by McGill University, Canada, in 2025. https://www.linkedin.com/posts/mcgill-university_mcgill-has-announced-its-spring-2025-honorary-activity-7325953371738173443-eQW1/

Professor Khan was born in Germany. His father (Rahim Miran-Khan) was Afghan, his mother (Ingeborg née Kallus) German. His family immigrated to Australia in 1965. Karim moved to Canada in 1997 and was hired at the University of British Columbia, Vancouver, in July 2000. Currently, he is a professor at UBC. He was the Scientific Director of the CIHR Institute of Musculoskeletal Health and Arthritis (CIHR-IMHA) from 2017-2025.

== Editor of the British Journal of Sports Medicine ==
During Karim Khan’s tenure as the Editor-in-Chief, the British Journal of Sports Medicine (BJSM) rose from being the 12th-ranked journal in sports science and medicine with an impact factor of 3.7 in 2012, increasing its impact factor each year to one of the leaders in this field. It had a 2021 impact factor of 13.8.

== Clinical Sports Medicine ==
Along with Peter Brukner, Karim Khan has published 6 editions of the textbook Brukner and Khan's Clinical Sports Medicine. It has been described as the Bible of Sports Medicine. The quality of the authorship has been lauded for drawing leaders in the fields of sports medicine and physiotherapy in particular and for its multidisciplinary content.

== Tendon and physical activity research ==
Khan played an important role in changing nomenclature of tendinitis to the preferred term of tendinopathy (or tendinosis) with the insight that the primary pathology is degenerative rather than inflammatory.

He has been credited with promoting the importance of physical activity for general health.

He has published over 350 works with over 57,000 citations and an H-index of 117.
