= John Crosbie (disambiguation) =

John Crosbie (John Carnell Crosbie; 1931–2020) is a retired Canadian politician.

John Crosbie may also refer to:

- John Crosbie (bishop) (died 1621), Irish bishop
- John Gustavus Crosbie (died 1797), Irish MP
- John Crosbie, 2nd Earl of Glandore (1753–1815), Irish politician
- Sir John Chalker Crosbie (1876–1932), Newfoundland politician
- Johnny Crosbie (1896–1982), Scottish footballer with Ayr United, Birmingham City, Scotland

== See also ==
- John Crosby (disambiguation)
