= Tomasz Drezner =

Polish jurist

Tomasz Drezner (1560–1616) was a Polish jurist.

The fame of Drezner's 1601 work, Processus iudiciarius Regni Poloniae (Judicial Procedure in the Kingdom of Poland), saw him admitted to the service of Royal Chancellor Jan Zamojski and allowed him to study in Paris, Padua and Orléans.

In 1610, Drezner was appointed to teach Roman and Polish law at the Zamojski Academy in Zamość, whose rector he became in 1615.
