= Zamoyski Academy =

Coordinates: 50°43′07″N 23°15′06″E

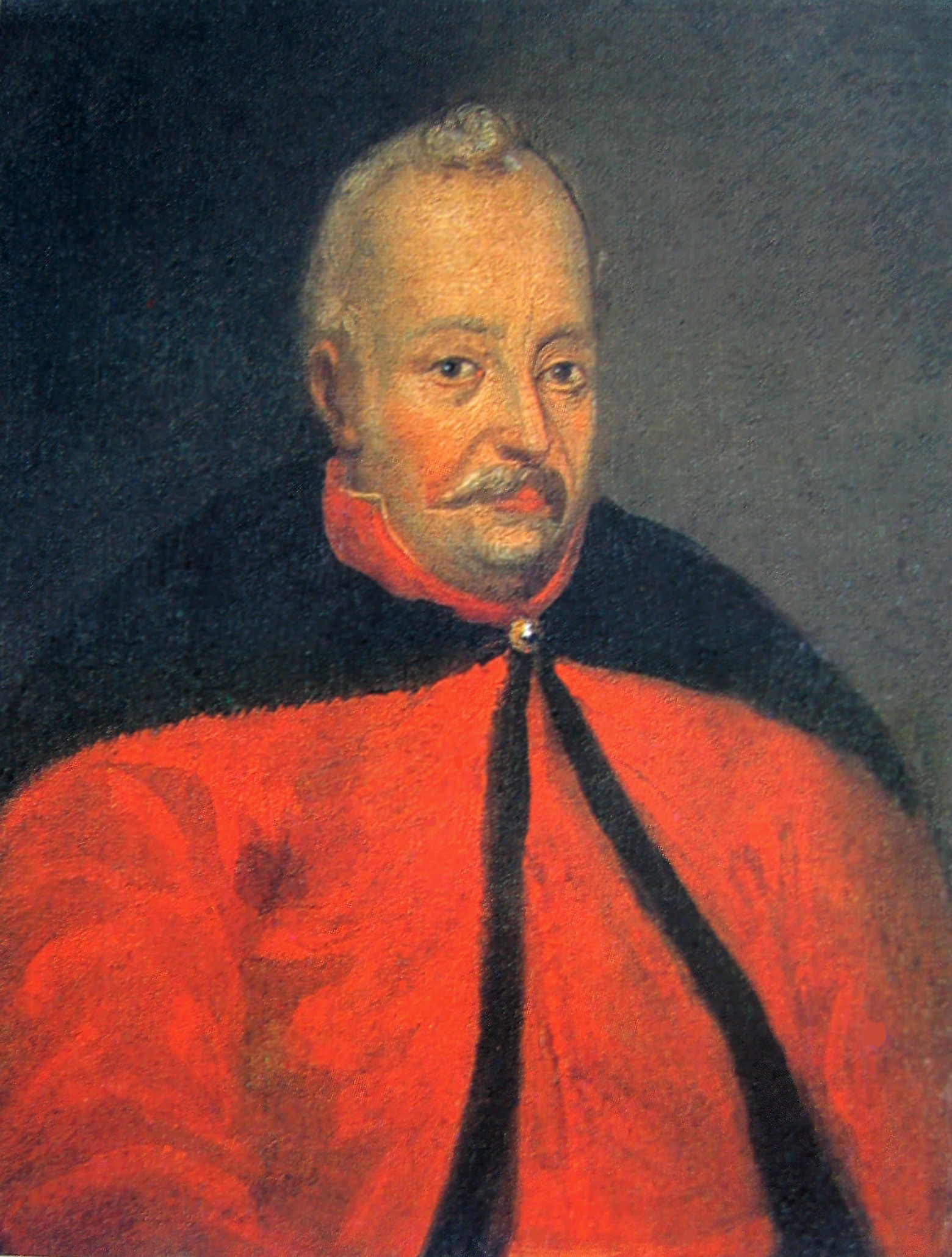
Jan Zamojski

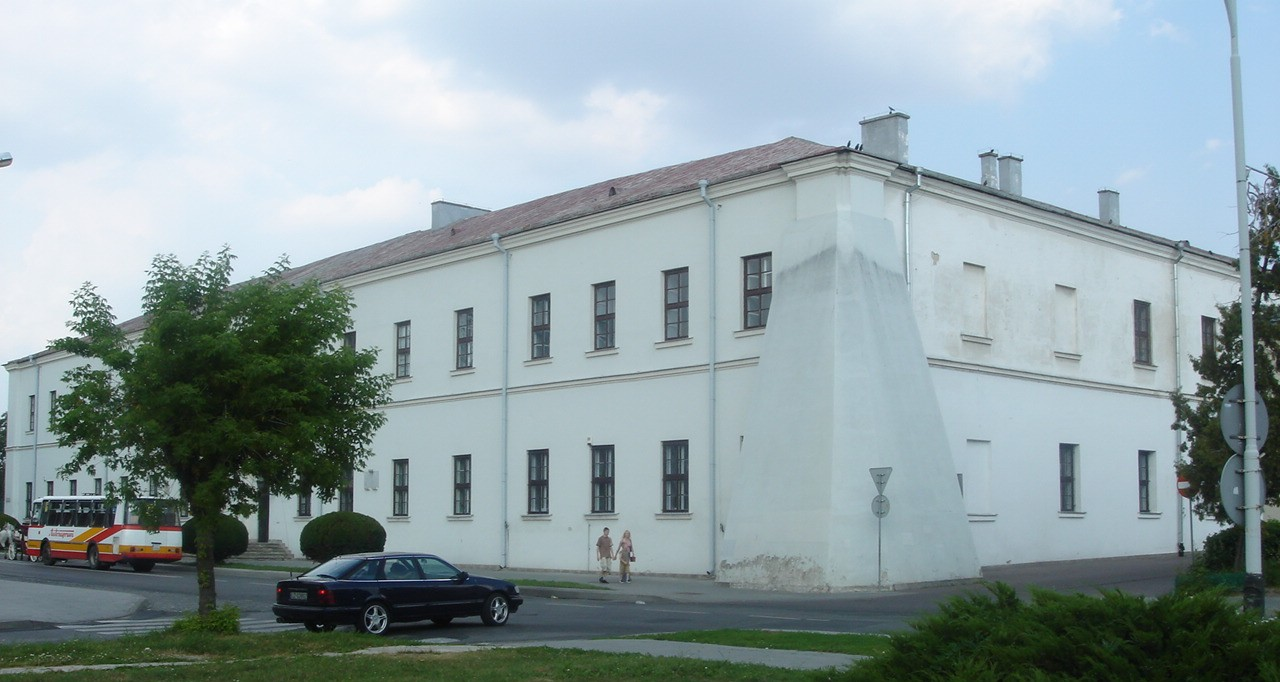
Main building of the Academy

The Zamojski Academy (Polish: Akademia Zamojska; Latin: Hippaeum Zamoscianum; 1594–1784) was an academy founded in 1594 by Polish Crown Chancellor Jan Zamojski. It was the third institution of higher education to be founded in the Polish–Lithuanian Commonwealth. After his death it slowly lost its importance, and in 1784 it was downgraded to a lyceum. The present-day I Liceum Ogólnokształcące im. Hetmana Jana Zamoyskiego w Zamościu is one of several secondary schools in Zamość.

== History ==
The Zamoyski Academy was designed to educate szlachta (noble) youth in Humanist culture and prepare them for work in the public interest—though, from its early years, most of the students were burghers, not nobles. It was founded in 1594 by Crown Chancellor Jan Zamoyski in Zamość (a city, also founded by Zamoyski) with the assistance of poet Szymon Szymonowic, aka Simon Simonides (who would be one of the Academy's lecturers). Its founding was approved in Rome by Pope Clement VIII (bull of October 29, 1594), and in Poland by the Bishop of Chełm, Stanisław Gomoliński. The official opening ceremony took place on 15 March 1595. On July 5, 1600, Zamoyski would write, in the Academy's foundation act: "such are countries, as is the education of their youth" ("takie są rzeczypospolite, jakie ich młodzieży chowanie"). In 1601 the King of Poland, Sigismund III Vasa, confirmed the act.

The Academy was modeled on the Academy of Strassburg. Initially the Academy comprised three departments: liberal arts, law, and medicine, and had seven faculty positions for professors. From 1637 the school had the power to award doctor of philosophy diplomas. In 1648, a department of theology was added. The Academy was the third institution of higher education to be founded in the Polish–Lithuanian Commonwealth (and the first private one), after the Kraków Academy (1364) and Vilnius University (1578) Zamoyski's immense wealth allowed him to be the first magnate in the Commonwealth to personally sponsor such an institution (Poznań's Lubrański Academy (1519) was a high school with a high level of education, hence it was called customary "academy").

The Academy was an institution midway between a secondary school and an institution of higher learning. It bestowed doctorates of philosophy and law. It was known for the high quality of education that it provided, which however did not extend beyond the ideals of "nobles' liberty."

The faculty included a number of outstanding Poles such as Szymon Szymonowic, Adam Burski (Bursius), Tomasz Drezner, Jan Niedźwiecki-Ursinus, Szymon (Simon) Birkowsk and Stanisław Staszic, as well as foreigners such as the English lawyer William Bruce, the Italian theologian Dominic Convalis and the Belgian mathematician Adriaan van Roomen. The Academy's chancellor was the incumbent Bishop of Chełm.

The students were recruited mainly from the southeastern lands of the Polish–Lithuanian Commonwealth and from adjacent countries.

Following an initial period of successful development, which at the turn of the 15th and 16th centuries made the Academy one of the leading educational institutions in the Polish–Lithuanian Commonwealth, from the mid-17th century the Academy went into decline. The number of students rose from 70 in 1595 to 1635 to around 120 in the years 1635 to 1646.

Its lost its lay character ten years after Zamoyski's death, when in 1615 it was taken over by the bishop of Chełm; the struggle over the control of the school between the bishops and lay officials of the Zamoyski family would continue for many years. It became increasingly difficult for the school to attract renown faculty. The academy was damaged in a fire of 1627, and from the Swedish invasion and wars of late 1640s/early 1650s. Several attempts at reform were undertaken in the following decades, none met with much success. Gradual improvement was interrupted in 1784, after the academy was shut down by the Austrian government (which had taken over that part of Poland in the late-18th-century partitions of Poland); it was closed and converted into a secondary school (Liceum Królewskie—Royal Lyceum). In 1811–66 the Lyceum's old Academy buildings were used as barracks for troops of the Zamość Fortress.

The present-day I Liceum Ogólnokształcące im. Hetmana Jana Zamoyskiego w Zamościu (Heman Jan Zamoyski General Lyceum in Zamość) traces its history to the Academy and is housed in the original building complex. It is one of several secondary schools in the city.

== See also ==
- Polish–Lithuanian Commonwealth
- Fables and Parables
- Lubrański Academy
