= Jonathan Drezner =

American sports medicine physician

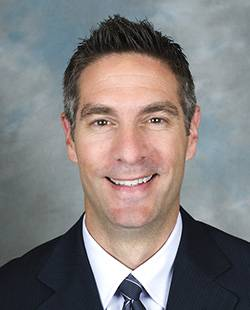
- Education: UCLA, University of Washington
- Medical career
- Profession: Sports and exercise physician
- Institutions: University of Washington
- Awards: 2014 KSI Lifesaving Research Award

Jonathan A. Drezner is an American sport and exercise medicine physician, currently editor in chief of the British Journal of Sports Medicine. In both clinical practice and research he has a strong interest in sports cardiology. He is a first author for the International Guidelines for Electrocardiography (ECG) Interpretation in athletes and was the 19th President of the American Medical Society for Sports Medicine (AMSSM) in 2012.

== Sports cardiology ==
Within the United States, Drezner is a strong advocate for inclusion of ECG/EKG screening in the preparticipation examination of athletes, as ECG screening has far superior sensitivity and specificity than physical examination. Routine ECG screening has been performed in Italian athletes for many years in the general population and has strong acceptance in Europe. As ECG screening became more routine in elite and professional athletes, experts from around the world tried to set criteria for normal athlete ECG appearances that minimized false positive and false negative cases. The Seattle criteria were led by Drezner and reported reductions in false positives compared to the previous criteria in use.

=== International guidelines for ECG interpretation in athletes ===
Drezner as the first author of the Seattle criteria and Sanjay Sharma representing European experts became co-first authors of new International Guidelines for ECG interpretation in athletes, co-published in the British Journal of Sports Medicine, Journal of the American College of Cardiology and European Heart Journal in 2017 and 2018.

These new International guidelines have quickly become the universal gold standard in interpretation of the athletic ECG. Drezner and the University of Washington have developed educational resources for physicians to improve their ability to follow the criteria to accurately interpret athletic ECGs, including with the British Medical Journal and Australasian College of Sport and Exercise Physicians.

== Research ==
He has published over 200 works with over 11,000 citations and with an H-index of 51. Key themes include electrocardiography interpretation in athletes, concussion and prevention of sudden cardiac death in athletes, especially with the use of Automated external defibrillators.

He was appointed in 2021 as the Editor-in-Chief for the British Journal of Sports Medicine, generally considered the world's leading Sports Medicine journal by Impact Factor. It had a 2019 impact factor of 12.680.

== Team physician work ==
He is Team Physician for the Seattle Seahawks, and participated in the 2014 Super Bowl. He is also a long-standing team physician for the Washington Huskies and the Head physician for the US Women's soccer team.
