= John Crosby (businessman) =

Australian Benderer and businessman

John Crosby, AM is an Australian agribusinessman.

== Career ==
Crosby graduated from the University of Adelaide (Roseworthy agriculture) in the class of 1969–70. He held senior positions with the National Farmers Federation and Agribusiness Association of Australia. During his time at the National Farmers Federation, Crosby worked on the floating of Elders Limited, which was previously an asset of Fosters. Following a period on the Board of Elders Crosby took a position as general manager at Elders looking after export hay, feedlots and new investments. Crosby is a former General Manager of the Dairy Authority of South Australia Chair of the Agribusiness Advisory Board at the University of Adelaide. Crosby has farmed cattle and grain at Lucindale in South Australia and has exported beef to Vietnam.

In 2012, his property interests at Lucindale, which he owned with his wife, covered some 900 hectares. In 2019, Crosby sold the last 598 hectares of his land at Lucindale to neighbouring farmers and retired from farming. Crosby still chairs several boards including Free Eyre Ltd, Peninsula Ports Pty Ltd, Stoney Pinch Sands

In 2017, he was awarded the Dinstinguished Alumni Award by Adelaide University. In 2021, Crosby was awarded a Member of the Order of Australia for his significant service to agribusiness, and to the farming sector.

== Personal life ==
Crosby is married to former Liberal Party Senator Mary-Jo Fisher. He has three children from his first marriage, David, James, and political strategist Raphaella Kathryn Crosby.
