= Adam Burski =

Polish philosopher (ca. 1560–1611)

Adam Burski or Bursius (ca. 1560–1611) was a Polish philosopher of the Renaissance period.

== History ==
Burski was a leading Polish representative of Neostoicism. He wrote a Dialectica Ciceronis (1604) that boldly proclaimed Stoic sensualism and empiricism and—before Francis Bacon—urged the use of inductive method. He set himself the same goals as Lipsius, the restorer of Stoicism famous in the West. Lipsius himself valued highly the work of his Polish fellow-philosopher.

Burski's person was associated with a new institution of higher learning that came into being in the late 16th century: the Zamojski Academy, founded in Zamość by Jan Zamoyski (who had also founded that city). At Zamoyski's invitation, Burski, who had been rector of the Lwów Lyceum and a professor at Kraków University, in 1596 at Zamość became a professor of moral philosophy, remaining in that post to the end of his life.

== See also ==
- History of philosophy in Poland
- List of Poles
