= John Crosby (MP for City of London) =

John Crosby (fl. 1467), was an English Member of Parliament (MP).

He was a Member of the Parliament of England for City of London in 1467.

== Crosby Place ==
He had a large and beautiful house, Crosbie's Place or Crosby Place, in Bishopsgate, built on the site of St Helen's Priory. It was an occasional residence of Richard III of England. In May 1586, the Danish ambassador Henrik Ramel was lodged there.
