= Alberto Gobbi =

Italian surgeon (born 1956)

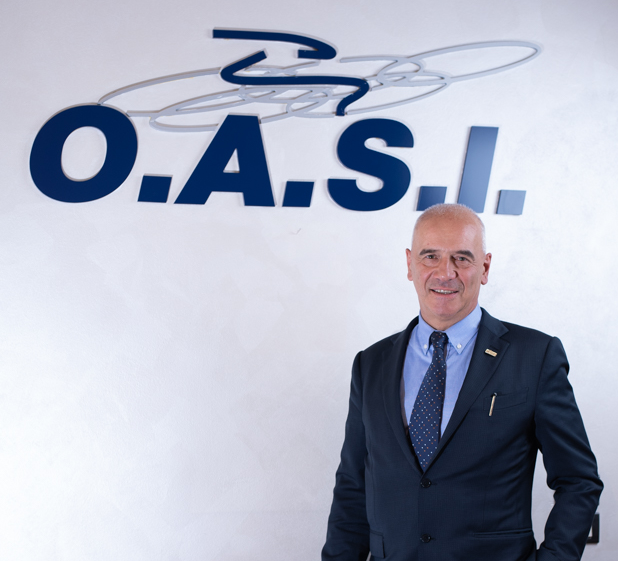
- Born: October 14, 1956 (age 70); Milan, Italy
- Education: University of Milan; University of Genoa
- Years active: 1983 - present
- Medical career
- Profession: Orthopedic Surgeon
- Institutions: University of California San Diego
- Website: cartilagedoctor.it

Alberto Gobbi (born 14 October 1956) is an Italian surgeon and researcher in orthopedics, traumatology and sports medicine known for his contributions in the fields of arthroscopic surgery, cartilage repair and regenerative medicine.

He performs scientific, surgical and educational activities at a national and international level. He currently serves as president of the ICRS (International Cartilage Regeneration & Preservation Society) and holds various other positions within some of the most prestigious medical societies in the field of orthopaedics, arthroscopy, sports medicine and scientific research. Dr. Gobbi’s office is located in Milan where he also chairs OASI Bioresearch Foundation Gobbi Onlus, a nonprofit organization, accredited by the Italian Ministry of Health and recognized as an International Teaching Center by ISAKOS (International Society of Arthroscopy, Knee Surgery & Orthopaedic Sports Medicine) and ICRS. The OASI Foundation promotes research into cartilage, joint aging and sports lesions through a network of collaborators from all over the world.

== Education ==
He was born in Milan, Italy on October 14, 1956, he completed his medical studies and graduated from the University of Milan in 1983 with a thesis on traumatic injuries in motorcycle sports. Later on, he completed a five-year residency in orthopaedics and traumatology with a thesis on the treatment of leg fractures in athletes. He also completed a second four-year residency program in sports medicine at the University of Genoa where he presented a thesis on physiological characteristics of motorcycle riders. He completed both programs with top marks and honours.

== Career ==
Alberto Gobbi trained in arthroscopic techniques in the US in the early eighties and he was one of the first Italian surgeons to be elected Honorary Member of the American Academy of Orthopaedic Surgeons (AAOS) and the Arthroscopy Association of North America (AANA). He is currently the director and president of Orthopaedic Arthroscopic Surgery International Bioresearch Foundation NPO and he serves as a visiting professor with the Department of Orthopaedic Surgery, University of California San Diego, USA. A Fellow of International Cartilage Repair Society (ICRS) for the last 10 years, he has served as member of the General Board 2004–2008, chair of Educational Committee, program Chair of the World meeting in Miami 2009, program Chair of Beijing ICRS meeting in 2011–2013. He currently serves as the Immediate Past President of the International Cartilage Repair Society (ICRS). Nominated member of the Executive Committee of ISAKOS (International Society of Arthroscopy, Knee Surgery & Orthopaedic Sports Medicine).

He is the founder and president of a nonprofit organization called Orthopaedic Arthroscopic Surgery International Bioresearch Foundation Onlus in Milan, an organization which is recognized by the Minister of Health for its non for profit research in the medical field.

Alberto Gobbi's Profile

== Publications ==
Alberto Gobbi is author and coauthor of over 200 scientific publications, appearing in international peer-reviewed journals including Cartilage, the American Journal of Sports Medicine, Sports Health, The Journal of Knee Surgery, Arthroscopy, Tissue engineering, Sports Medicine and Arthroscopy review, KSSTA. Recently he worked as Chief editor and contributed several chapters to the book “Bio Orthopedics: A new approach” with J.G. Lane, J. Espregueira-Mendes, M. Karahan, he was also an editor and contributed several chapters to the book “The Anterior Cruciate Ligament – Reconstruction & Basic Science” Editors: Andrews, Brown, Fu, Georgoulis, Gobbi, Noyes; Shelbourne 2nd Edition” and 2 chapters for the book “Most frequent problems and Injuries in Football”. He was also an editor and author for the book The patellofemoral joint: State of the Art in Evaluation and Management.

Alberto Gobbi's Publications
