= James H. Lubowitz =

American surgeon

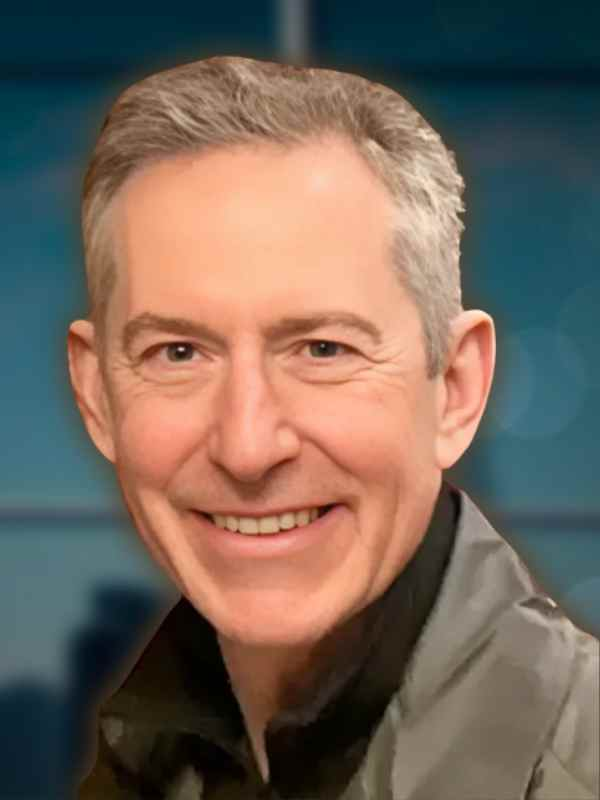
- James H. Lubowitz
- Born: September 9, 1962; Philadelphia, PA
- Education: Perelman School of Medicine at University of Pennsylvania
- Occupations: Orthopedic Surgeon, Sports Medicine Specialist, Editor-in-Chief Emeritus, Consultant

James H. Lubowitz (born September 9, 1962) is an American orthopedic surgeon and sports medicine specialist known for knee arthroscopic surgery research and education, and leadership roles in academic and clinical orthopedic organizations. He serves as Editor-in-Chief Emeritus of Arthroscopy, as well as two open access companion journals, Arthroscopy Techniques, and Arthroscopy, Sports Medicine, and Rehabilitation. These are the official journals of AANA, the Arthroscopy Association of North America. Now retired from clinical practice, Lubowitz was the founding director of the Taos Orthopaedic Institute, and its associated Research Foundation and Fellowship Training Program.

== Early life and education ==
Lubowitz earned his Bachelor of Arts in the History of Art in 1984 at Harvard University with a Phi Beta Kappa, magna cum laude distinction. While at Harvard, he was co-captain of the intercollegiate champions in Varsity Squash. He was named All-Ivy League and earned honorable mention All-American honors.

After his undergraduate education, Lubowitz attended the University of Pennsylvania School of Medicine in his hometown of Philadelphia and graduated in 1988 earning his Doctor of Medicine. He then completed a general surgery internship and orthopedic surgery residency at the University of California, Los Angeles (UCLA), and an orthopedic sports medicine fellowship at the Thomas Jefferson University and Rothman Institute of Pennsylvania Hospital.

== Medical career ==
Lubowitz founded Taos Orthopaedic Institute; the Taos Orthopaedic Institute Research Foundation; and the Taos Orthopaedic Institute Sports Medicine Fellowship and Training Program. These institutions were established in Taos, New Mexico to advance the practice of orthopedic sports medicine and arthroscopic surgery research, teaching, and clinical care, with an emphasis on preventing injury and treating patients including athletes.

== Sports medicine ==
Lubowitz was appointed to the medical staff of the United States Ski and Snowboard Team in 1995 and provided event site medical coverage for U.S. Ski Team Alpine athletes at training camps and World Cup ski races through 2024. He also served as team physician for New Mexico Highlands University, Northern New Mexico College, Taos High School, and Capital High School, Santa Fe.

== Editorial roles and contributions ==
Lubowitz began as a reviewer at Arthroscopy in 1997, and he was chosen Reviewer of the Year in 2000. He went on to become a member of the Journal's Editorial Board in 2001 and then an Associate Editor in 2002. In 2007 he was appointed the first Assistant Editor-in-Chief of Arthroscopy, a position established after action by the Journal's Board of Trustees and approval by the AANA Board. In 2014, he was selected as the journal’s third Editor-in-Chief. In 2012, Lubowitz and colleagues introduced Arthroscopy Techniques journal with an emphasis on video and in 2017, Lubowitz and colleagues introduced Arthroscopy, Sports Medicine, and Rehabilitation (ASMAR), a third AANA journal. In 2025 Lubowitz became Editor-in-Chief Emeritus of all three journals.

== Research and publication ==
James H. Lubowitz has written numerous articles in major orthopaedic and sports medicine journals on arthroscopic surgery, knee surgery, and ACL reconstruction. He has published more than 500 peer reviewed scientific articles, as well as book chapters, and is an editor of the textbook, The Knee: AANA Advanced Arthroscopic Surgical Techniques (2017). He has contributed to new surgical techniques including no-tunnel, all-inside ACL reconstruction; no tunnel double-bundle ACL reconstruction; all-inside ACL graft-link, second-generation, no-incision ACL reconstruction, and knee anatomic ligament reconstruction with internal bracing.

== Professional memberships and awards ==
Lubowitz is a member of numerous medical societies including AANA, the American Academy of Orthopaedic Surgeons (AAOS), and the International Society of Arthroscopy, Knee Surgery and Orthopaedic Sports Medicine (ISAKOS). His awards include the Richard O’Connor Award for original scientific research in 2005 and in 2008.
