= Stefano Della Villa =

Italian sports medicine physician

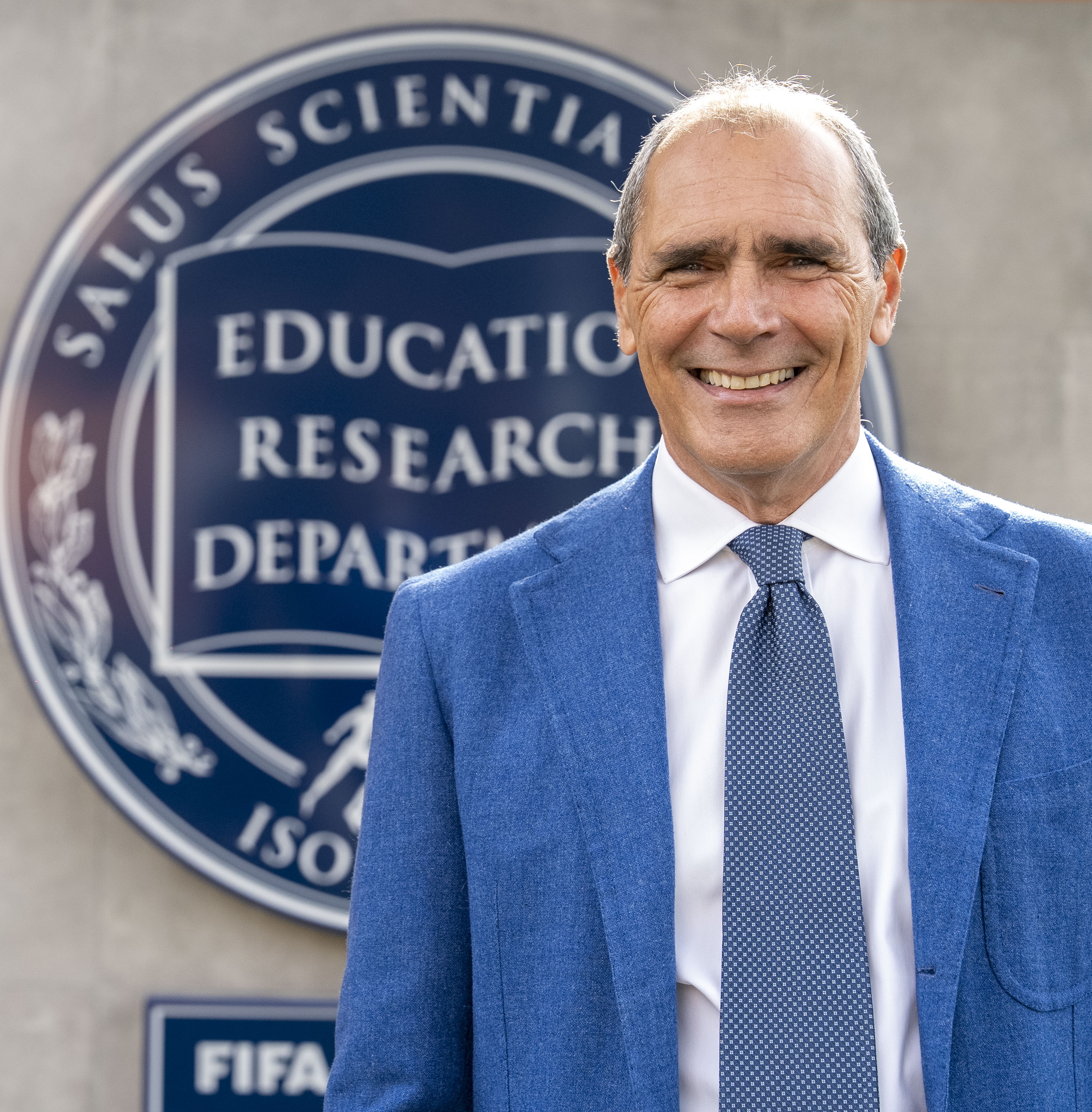
- Della Villa in 2026
- Born: 1960 (age 65–66); Bologna, Italy
- Education: University of Bologna
- Known for: Founder of Isokinetic Medical Group; Sports Medicine and Rehabilitation
- Children: Francesco Della Villa; Laura Della Villa
- Awards: Sports Health T. David Sisk Award (2013)
- Scientific career
- Fields: Sports medicine Orthopedic rehabilitation Physiatrics
- Workplaces: Isokinetic Medical Group
- Academic advisors: Pier Giorgio Marchetti; Maurilio Marcacci; Michael Dillingham; Richard Eagleston
- Website: https://isokinetic.com

Stefano Della Villa (born 1960 in Bologna) is an Italian sports medicine physician, physiatrist, and entrepreneur. He is the president and founder of the Isokinetic Medical Group, an international network of sports rehabilitation clinics headquartered in Bologna, Italy, and serves within its Educational and Research Department.

== Education ==
Della Villa earned his Medicine and Surgery degree (MD) from the University of Bologna in 1985. He specialized in physical medicine and rehabilitation under the supervision of Pier Giorgio Marchetti and Maurilio Marcacci at the Rizzoli Orthopaedic Institute, completing his residency in Orthopaedic and Sport Rehabilitation in 1988.

From 1987 to 1988, as part of his residency training, Della Villa completed a fellowship with Michael Dillingham, Director of the Sports Medicine Programme at Stanford University, and with Richard Eagleston, physical therapist for the Stanford Swimming Team.

In 1991, he completed a Master's degree in Medical management at the SDA Bocconi School of Management at Bocconi University in Milan, Italy.

== Career ==
Upon returning to Italy, Della Villa founded the first Isokinetic sports rehabilitation clinic in August 1987 in Bologna, initially operating at the Salus Doctor’s Clinic. In 1990, the clinic relocated to the vicinity of the Bologna FC headquarters at Casteldebole. In 1992, Della Villa organized the first International Congress of Sport Rehabilitation and Traumatology, which evolved into the annual Football Medicine Conference. In 2009, the group received accreditation as a FIFA Medical Centre of Excellence.

In 2000, he co-founded the Isokinetic Educational and Research Department with physiologist Giulio Sergio Roi to advance clinical training and scientific output. Throughout the 2000s, Della Villa directed the expansion of the Isokinetic network across Italy, establishing facilities in Milan (2001), Turin (2003), Verona (2004), Rome (2005), and Rimini (2008). He later oversaw international expansion, opening clinics in London (2012) and Athens (2024) and started scientific collaborations with, among others, Freddie Fu at the University of Pittsburgh Medical Center.

Della Villa has served as a board member and collaborator for multiple scientific societies. He was the president of the Rehabilitation Committee of the Italian Scientific Society SIAGASCOT from 2006 to 2010, and since 2008, he has served as a member of the Sports Injury and Rehabilitation Committee of the International Cartilage Regeneration & Joint Preservation Society (ICRS). He is also a faculty member and active collaborator with the European Society of Sports Traumatology, Knee Surgery and Arthroscopy (ESSKA), the European College of Sports and Exercise Physicians (ECOSEP) and FIFA Medical.

== Athlete rehabilitation ==
Over the years, Della Villa and his centers have managed the rehabilitation of professional athletes. For example, they helped footballer Eraldo Pecci return to the pitch 11 days after a meniscus operation in 1988, and enabled Roberto Baggio to play 90 days after an anterior cruciate ligament rupture in 2002. The network has treated professional athletes across multiple sports, including Olympic skier Alberto Tomba, football World Cup champions such as Gianluigi Buffon, Luca Toni, and Filippo Inzaghi, alongside basketball players like Danilo Gallinari, Marco Belinelli and Miloš Teodosić. As of 2024, the facilities treat thousands of patients annually.

In addition to his clinical work, Della Villa advocates for injury prevention, noting that proactive measures improve both the physical and economic outcomes for players and clubs. He is a proponent of standardized prevention programs, particularly the FIFA 11+ initiative developed by Jiří Dvořák at the FIFA Medical Assessment and Research Centre (F-MARC).

== Research ==
Della Villa's clinical work and research focus on sports medicine, orthopaedic rehabilitation, and the prevention and treatment of sports injuries, with a specific emphasis on association football. His research investigates anterior cruciate ligament (ACL) reconstruction and protocols for safe return to play post-surgery using structured functional recovery programs.

Through the Isokinetic Educational and Research Department, Della Villa has conducted systematic video analyses of ACL injuries in professional male footballers to identify non-contact injury mechanisms, biomechanics, and situational patterns. He has also researched the epidemiology of second ACL injuries following initial reconstructions using data from the UEFA Elite Club Injury Study. Furthermore, his studies have assessed clinical outcomes and early sports practice following arthroscopic autologous chondrocyte implantation. He has additionally published on the rehabilitation process from the perspective of a patient, documenting his own recovery from a triple cervical disc herniation and subsequent neck surgery. Della Villa also maintains an active research collaboration with the University of Bologna.

== Distinctions ==
- 2013: American Orthopaedic Society of Sports Medicine Sports Health T. David Sisk Award

== Selected works ==
- Della Villa, Francesco; Hägglund, Martin; Della Villa, Stefano; Ekstrand, Jan; Waldén, Markus (2021-12-01). "High rate of second ACL injury following ACL reconstruction in male professional footballers: an updated longitudinal analysis from 118 players in the UEFA Elite Club Injury Study". British Journal of Sports Medicine. 55 (23): 1350–1356. doi:10.1136/bjsports-2020-103555. ISSN 1473-0480. PMC 8606446. PMID 33846157.
- Della Villa, Francesco; Buckthorpe, Matthew; Grassi, Alberto; Nabiuzzi, Alberto; Tosarelli, Filippo; Zaffagnini, Stefano; Della Villa, Stefano (2020-12-01). "Systematic video analysis of ACL injuries in professional male football (soccer): injury mechanisms, situational patterns and biomechanics study on 134 consecutive cases". British Journal of Sports Medicine. 54 (23): 1423–1432. doi:10.1136/bjsports-2019-101247. ISSN 1473-0480. PMID 32561515.
- Scott, Alex; LaPrade, Robert F.; Harmon, Kimberly G.; Filardo, Giuseppe; Kon, Elizaveta; Della Villa, Stefano; Bahr, Roald; Moksnes, Havard; Torgalsen, Thomas; Lee, Jenny; Dragoo, Jason L.; Engebretsen, Lars (2019-06-01). "Platelet-Rich Plasma for Patellar Tendinopathy: A Randomized Controlled Trial of Leukocyte-Rich PRP or Leukocyte-Poor PRP Versus Saline". The American Journal of Sports Medicine. 47 (7): 1654–1661. doi:10.1177/0363546519837954. ISSN 1552-3365. PMID 31038979.
- Della Villa, Stefano (2019-12-01). "Before and after major neck surgery". British Journal of Sports Medicine. 53 (24): 1565–1566. doi:10.1136/bjsports-2018-100247. ISSN 1473-0480. PMID 30518521.
- Buckthorpe, Matthew; Wright, Steve; Bruce-Low, Stewart; Nanni, Gianni; Sturdy, Thomas; Gross, Aleksander Stephan; Bowen, Laura; Styles, Bill; Della Villa, Stefano; Davison, Michael; Gimpel, Mo (2019-04-01). "Recommendations for hamstring injury prevention in elite football: translating research into practice". British Journal of Sports Medicine. 53 (7): 449–456. doi:10.1136/bjsports-2018-099616. ISSN 1473-0480. PMC 6579500. PMID 30413424.
- Della Villa, Stefano; Boldrini, Lorenzo; Ricci, Margherita; Danelon, Furio; Snyder-Mackler, Lynn; Nanni, Gianni; Roi, Giulio Sergio (2012-01-01). "Clinical Outcomes and Return-to-Sports Participation of 50 Soccer Players After Anterior Cruciate Ligament Reconstruction Through a Sport-Specific Rehabilitation Protocol". Sports Health. 4 (1): 17–24. doi:10.1177/1941738111417564. ISSN 1941-0921. PMC 3435892. PMID 23016064.
- Kon, Elizaveta; Filardo, Giuseppe; Drobnic, Matej; Madry, Henning; Jelic, Mislav; van Dijk, Niek; Della Villa, Stefano (2012-03-01). "Non-surgical management of early knee osteoarthritis". Knee Surgery, Sports Traumatology, Arthroscopy: Official Journal of the ESSKA. 20 (3): 436–449. doi:10.1007/s00167-011-1713-8. ISSN 1433-7347. PMID 22037809.
- Della Villa, Stefano; Kon, Elizaveta; Filardo, Giuseppe; Ricci, Margherita; Vincentelli, Ferruccio; Delcogliano, Marco; Marcacci, Maurilio (2010-01-01). "Does intensive rehabilitation permit early return to sport without compromising the clinical outcome after arthroscopic autologous chondrocyte implantation in highly competitive athletes?". The American Journal of Sports Medicine. 38 (1): 68–77. doi:10.1177/0363546509348490. ISSN 1552-3365. PMID 20051508.
