= Matthew Matava =

American orthopedic surgeon

Matthew Joseph Matava is an American orthopedic surgeon. Matava is a Professor of Orthopedic Surgery and Physical Therapy, the head team physician for the Washington University Bears, as well as a team physician for the St. Louis Blues. He is also the president of the National Football League (NFL) Physician Society.

== Early life and education ==
Matava attended St. Charles High School where he played basketball, baseball, and football. He was an all-conference basketball player but was only a walk-on at the University of Missouri–Kansas City (UMKC). While attending UMKC, Matava suffered a torn ACL which derailed his athletic career and inspired his interest in surgery. After graduating with his medical degree, he aimed to complete his residency in general surgery at Emory University School of Medicine, but quickly switched to orthopedic surgery after his first rotation. After finishing his residency, he completed a fellowship with the Sports Medicine & Arthroscopic Surgery division of the Cincinnati Sports Medicine and Orthopedic Center.

== Career ==
Matava joined Washington University School of Medicine in 1994 and began working as the head team physician for the Washington University in St. Louis athletics department. The following year, his senior partner Robert Shively took over as head team physician for the St. Louis Rams but he replaced Shively following the Super Bowl XXXIV.

On January 1, 2006, Matava was appointed Associate Editor for the journal Arthroscopy. In 2012, Matava spearheaded the idea to ensure that there were orthopedics surgeons on the sidelines for high school football games. In the same year, he was the lead author of Recommendations of the national football league physician society task force on the use of toradol(®) ketorolac in the national football league. Two years later, Matava was recognized as a Top 28 Sports Knee Surgeon in North America and was appointed Chief of Sports Medicine Service at Washington University.

Matava served as the Secretary and Vice President of the Southern Orthopaedic Association (SOA) from 2016 to 2017 before being elected president. In November 2018, Matava was inducted into the Missouri Sports Hall of Fame for his accomplishments in sports medicine, primarily his service as Head Team Physician for the St. Louis Rams. When the St. Louis Blues won the Stanley Cup in 2019, he received a Stanley Cup ring for his services.
