= Gobbi =

Gobbi is an Italian surname. Notable people with the surname include:

- Alberto Gobbi (born 1956), Italian surgeon and researcher
- Alfredo Gobbi (1912-1965), Argentine violin player, composer and bandleader during the Golden Age of tango
- Alois Gobbi (1842-1932), Hungarian violinist
- Henri Gobbi (19th century), Hungarian classical composer and piano professor
- Hilda Gobbi (1913–1988), Hungarian actress and philanthropist
- John Gobbi (born 1981), Swiss ice hockey player
- Luca Gobbi (born 1971), San Marino former footballer
- Marina Gobbi (born 1989), female Brazilian recurve archer
- Massimo Gobbi (born 1980), Italian football player
- Michele Gobbi (born 1977), former Italian cyclist
- Pasqualino Gobbi (fl. early 18th century), cleric
- Sergio Gobbi (born 1938), born as Sergio Ehrlich, Italian-French filmmaker
- Stefano Gobbi (1930–2011), Italian Roman Catholic priest
- Tito Gobbi (1913–1984), Italian operatic baritone

== See also ==
- 29568 Gobbi-Belcredi, main-belt minor planet
