= Constance Chu =

American professor of orthopaedic surgery

- Born: Constance R. Chu; Minneapolis, Minnesota, U.S.
- Education: United States Military Academy (B.S.); Harvard Medical School (M.D.)
- Scientific career
- Fields: Orthopedic surgery, Biomedical engineering
- Workplaces: Stanford University; University of Pittsburgh

Constance R. Chu is an American orthopedic surgeon and scientist working to improve public health by preserving joint health and mobility. She is Professor and Vice Chair of Research in the Department of Orthopedic Surgery at Stanford University, practices orthopedic sports medicine at Stanford Health Care, and serves as Director of the Joint Preservation Center at the VA Palo Alto Health Care System, where imaging and regenerative medicine are integrated with clinical research and patient care.

== Early life and education ==
Chu was born in Minneapolis, Minnesota and was raised in Southern California. She graduated from the United States Military Academy at West Point in 1983, where she was among the first classes to graduate female cadets.

Chu also holds a medical degree from Harvard Medical School.

== Military career ==
Chu was commissioned in the United States Army and served in military intelligence, specializing in cryptology and imaging intelligence. As a lieutenant, she led a 170-soldier signals intelligence platoon at Field Station Augsburg in Germany, later managing educational programs for this brigade-sized unit. She was promoted to captain and commanded an imaging intelligence unit at Fort Bragg, North Carolina. She resigned from active duty to pursue medical training.

== Medical career ==
Chu earned her medical degree from Harvard Medical School. She completed her residency in orthopedic surgery at the University of California, San Diego and a fellowship in adult reconstructive surgery at Brigham and Women's Hospital of Harvard Medical School.

She was subsequently recruited to the University of Pittsburgh, where she secured multiple peer-reviewed research grants from the National Institutes of Health and became the founding director of the Cartilage Restoration Center, a translational research program. She was promoted to professor of orthopaedic surgery and bioengineering and held the Albert B. Ferguson Endowed Chair.

Chu later joined Stanford University as Vice Chair of Research in the Department of Orthopedic Surgery. She also directs the Joint Preservation Center, which integrates biologics, mechanics, and imaging in musculoskeletal care. Her clinical practice focuses on knee injuries and the proactive treatment of joint pain to prevent osteoarthritis, particularly following ACL, cartilage, and meniscus injuries.

== Research ==
Chu's research addresses joint preservation and osteoarthritis (OA) prevention, with emphasis on early diagnosis and treatment of joint injuries. Her early work in tissue engineering demonstrated the feasibility of using cell-seeded biodegradable scaffolds to repair cartilage defects in vivo.

Chu co-developed an optical coherence tomography (OCT) arthroscope and was the first to perform arthroscopic OCT imaging of human articular cartilage.

She led studies demonstrating that local anesthetics such as bupivacaine and lidocaine are cytotoxic to articular cartilage in a dose- and time-dependent manner, contributing to an FDA warning issued in 2009 regarding intra-articular pain pumps.

Chu helped develop quantitative MRI techniques, including ultra-short echo time (UTE) T2* mapping to detect cartilage and meniscus injury not visible on standard MRI.

She has proposed a clinical framework for "pre-osteoarthritis", aiming to shift treatment from palliation to prevention. Her work supports early, individualized, and multidisciplinary interventions to restore and rejuvenate joints.

Chu's lab has also advanced gene therapy approaches for joint diseases, showing that intra-articular delivery of adeno-associated virus (AAV) vectors enables safe and sustained therapeutic gene expression.

In studies of platelet-rich plasma (PRP), she reported that age and donor health status affect PRP's biological activity, with older or less healthy donors' PRP potentially promoting inflammation rather than repair.

She has organized national NIH- and AAOS-sponsored workshops on osteoarthritis prevention and the use of orthobiologics in regenerative medicine. Her research has been funded by the National Institutes of Health, the U.S. Department of Defense, and the U.S. Department of Veterans Affairs. In 2019, she received the Elizabeth Winston Lanier Kappa Delta Award from the AAOS.

== Professional affiliations ==
Chu is a member of the American Academy of Orthopaedic Surgeons (AAOS), the American Orthopaedic Society for Sports Medicine (AOSSM), and serves as an academic member-at-large of the National Academies of Sciences, Engineering, and Medicine Forum on Regenerative Medicine.

== Awards and recognition ==
Chu has received over 30 professional honors and awards, including:

- Kappa Delta Young Investigator Award, AAOS (2007)
- O'Donoghue Sports Injury Award by American Orthopaedic Society for Sports Medicine (2016)
- Elizabeth Winston Lanier Kappa Delta Award, AAOS (2019)
- Included in Becker's Spine Review list of top U.S. knee surgeons (2019)
- Excellence in Research Award by American Orthopaedic Society for Sports Medicine (2024)
