= Anterior cruciate ligament reconstruction =

Surgical process

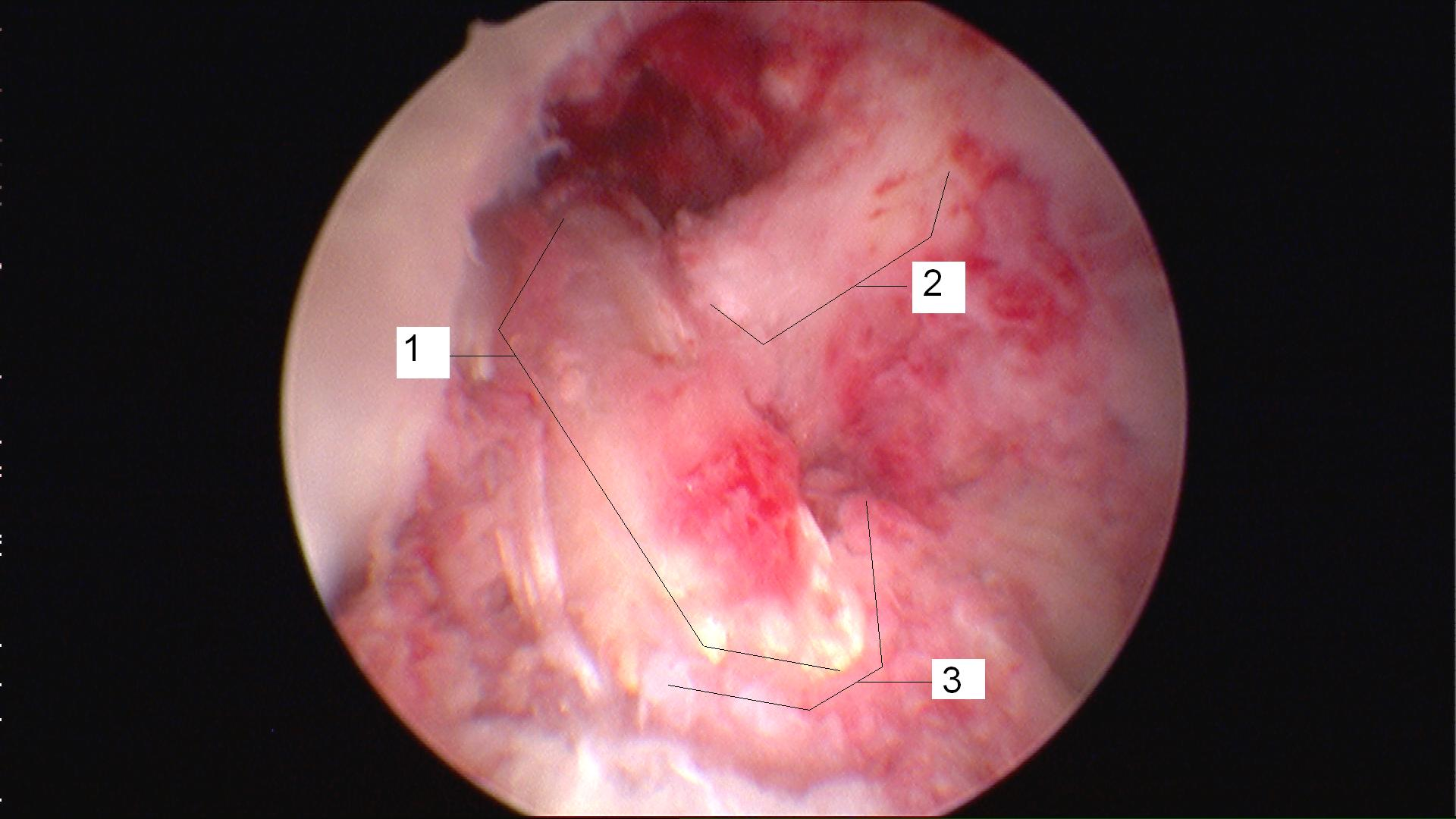
- Arthroscopic anterior cruciate ligament (ACL) reconstruction (right knee). The tendon of the semitendinosus muscle was prelevated, folded and used as an autograft (1). It appears through the remnant of the injured original ACL (3). The autograft then courses upwardly and backwardly in front of the posterior cruciate ligament (2).
- Other names: ACL reconstruction
- ICD-9-CM: 81.45
- MedlinePlus: 007208

Anterior cruciate ligament reconstruction (ACL reconstruction) is a surgical tissue graft replacement of the anterior cruciate ligament, located in the knee, to restore its function after an injury. The torn ligament can either be removed from the knee (most common), or preserved (where the graft is passed inside the preserved ruptured native ligament) before reconstruction through an arthroscopic procedure.

== Background ==
The Anterior Cruciate Ligament (ACL) is the ligament that keeps the knee stable. ACL damage is a very common injury, especially among athletes. ACL Reconstruction surgery is a common intervention. There are approximately 200,000 ACL tears occurring annually and between 100,000 and 300,000 reconstruction surgeries will be performed each year in the United States. Around $500 million health care dollar will come from ACL injuries. ACL injuries can be categorized into groups- contact and non-contact based on the nature of the injury Contact injuries occur when a person or object come into contact with the knee causing the ligament to tear. ACL injuries are commonly non-contact injuries, which occur during rapid changes of velocity or direction, like pivoting, twisting and poor landing biomechanics. ACL injury is 4-6 times higher in females than in males. ACL injuries account for a quarter of all knee injuries in the high school population. An increased Q angle and hormonal differences are a few causes of the gender disparity in ACL tear rates.

== Types of grafts ==
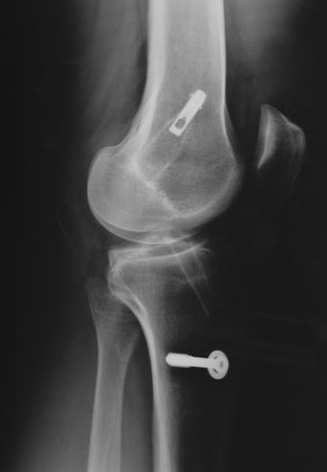
Grafts are inserted through a tunnel that is drilled through the shin bone (tibia) and thigh bone (femur). The graft is then pulled through the tunnel and fixated with screws. The two bright objects in this X-ray are screws in the thigh bone (above) and shin bone (below).

Graft options for ACL reconstruction include:

- Autografts (employing bone or tissue harvested from the patient's body).
- Allografts (using bone or tissue from another body, either a cadaver or a live donor).
- Bridge-enhanced ACL repair (using a bio-engineered bridging scaffold injected with the patient's own blood).
- Synthetic tissue for ACL reconstruction has also been developed, but little data exists on its strength and reliability.

=== Autograft ===
An accessory hamstring or part of the patellar ligament are the most common donor tissues used in autografts. While originally less commonly utilized, the quadriceps tendon has become a more popular graft.

Because the tissue used in an autograft is the patient's own, the risk of rejection is minimal. The retear rate in young, active individuals has been shown to be lower when using autograft as compared to allograft.

No fully ideal autograft site for ACL reconstruction exists. Surgeons have historically regarded patellar tendon grafts as the "gold standard" for knee stability.

Hamstring autografts have failed at a higher rate than bone-tendon-bone autografts (2017 meta-analysis), after short- to mid-term followup of primary ACL reconstruction. However, the observed difference in failure rates is small enough that both are still regarded as viable options for primary ACL reconstruction.

Hamstring grafts historically had problems with fixation slippage and stretching out over time. Modern fixation methods avoid graft slippage and produce similarly stable outcomes with easier rehabilitation, less anterior knee pain and less joint stiffness.

The quadriceps tendon, while historically reserved for revision reconstructions, has enjoyed a renewed focus as a versatile and durable graft for primary reconstructions. Use of the quadriceps tendon usually does not result in the same degree of anterior knee pain postoperatively, and quadriceps tendon harvest produces a reliably thick, robust graft. However, harvest of the quadriceps tendon has more quadriceps inhibition post-operatively and a typically requires longer to recover quad strength, though comparable in the long term. The quadriceps tendon has approximately 20% greater collagen per cross-sectional area than the patellar tendon, and a greater diameter of usable soft tissue is available.

==== Hamstring tendon ====
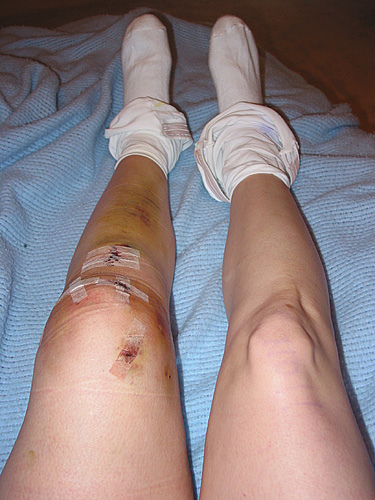
Left knee following hamstring autograft ACL reconstruction, partial meniscectomy and medial meniscus repair. "Socks" are actually post-op pressure stockings.

Hamstring autografts are made with the semitendinosus tendon, either alone or accompanied by the gracilis tendon for a stronger graft. The semitendinosus is an accessory hamstring (the primary hamstrings are left intact), and the gracilis is not a hamstring, but an accessory adductor (the primary adductors are left intact as well). The two tendons are commonly combined and referred to as a four-strand hamstring graft, made by a long piece (about 25 cm) removed from each tendon. The tendon segments are folded and braided together to form a tendon of quadruple thickness for the graft. The braided segment is threaded through the heads of the tibia and femur, and its ends are fixed with screws on the opposite sides of the two bones.

Unlike the patellar ligament, the hamstring tendon's fixation to the bone can be affected by motion after surgery. Therefore, a brace is often used to immobilize the knee for one to two weeks. Evidence suggests that the hamstring tendon graft does as well, or nearly as well, as the patellar ligament graft in the long term. A Cochrane review in 2011 found insufficient evidence to suggest whether a hamstring versus patellar ligament graft was superior. It found that individuals receiving hamstring autografts had reduced flexion (bending knee) range of motion and strength. Common problems during recovery include strengthening of the quadriceps, IT-band, and calf muscles.

The main surgical wound is over the upper proximal tibia, which prevents the typical pain experienced when kneeling after surgery. The wound is typically smaller than that of a patellar ligament graft, and so causes less post-operative pain. Another option first described by Kodkani et al in 2004, a minimally invasive technique for harvesting from the back of the knee (Posterior Mini-incision), is faster, produces a significantly smaller wound, avoids the complications of graft harvesting from the anterior incision, and decreases the risk of nerve injury. Saphenous Nerve Injury prevention during Hamstring tendon harvesting is achieved primarily through careful incision planning and meticulous surgical technique. Oblique or modified oblique skin incisions are preferred over vertical or transverse incisions to minimize the risk of injuring the infrapatellar branch of the saphenous nerve. Limited soft-tissue dissection and delicate handling of the subcutaneous layer are essential to preserve small sensory branches. Direct visualization and protection of the nerve may be performed when its course is identifiable. The use of posterior or popliteal incisions, as well as minimally invasive or endoscopic harvesting techniques, has been shown to further decrease the incidence of iatrogenic nerve damage.

There is some controversy as to how well a hamstring tendon regenerates after the harvesting. Most studies suggest that the tendon can be regenerated at least partially, though it will still be weaker than the original tendon.

Advantages of hamstring grafts include their high "load to failure" strength, the stiffness of the graft, and the low postoperative morbidity. The natural ACL can withstand a load of up to 2,160 newtons. With a hamstring graft, this number doubles, decreasing the risk of re-injury. The stiffness of a hamstring graft—quadruple that of the natural ACL (Bartlett, Clatworthy and Ngugen, 2001)—also reduces the risk of re-injury.

==== Patellar tendon ====
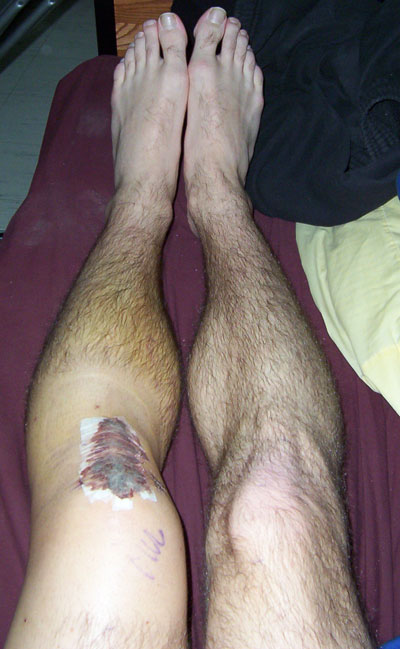
Knees following ACL reconstruction surgery. A patellar tendon graft was used. Discoloration of the left leg is from swelling that drained from the knee to the shin.

The patellar tendon connects the patella (kneecap) to the tibia (shin). The graft is normally taken from the injured knee, but in some circumstances, such as a second operation, the other knee may be used. The middle third of the tendon is used, with bone fragments removed on each end. The graft is then threaded through holes drilled in the tibia and femur, and screwed into place. It is slightly larger than a hamstring graft.

A 2011 Cochrane review, found no significant difference in long term outcome between patellar and hamstring autografts. Those receiving patellar autografts had improved static stability but a loss of extension (straightening knee) range of motion and strength.

Disadvantages compared with a hamstring graft include:

- Increased wound pain
- Increased scar formation
- Risk of fracturing the patella during harvesting of the graft
- Increased risk of tendinitis.
- Increased pain levels, even years after surgery, with activities that require kneeling.

Some or all of these disadvantages may be attributable to post-operative patellar tendon shortening.

Contralateral patellar tendon ACL revision

The rehabilitation after the surgery is different for each knee. The beginning rehab for the ACL graft knee is focused on reducing swelling, gaining full range of motion, and stimulating the leg muscles. The goal for the graft donor need is to immediately start high repetition strength training exercises.

=== Allograft ===
The patellar ligament, tibialis anterior tendon, or Achilles tendon may be recovered from a cadaver and used in ACL reconstruction. The Achilles tendon, because of its large size, must be shaved to fit within the joint cavity.

Although there is less experience with the use of tibialis anterior grafts, preliminary data has shown no difference in short-term subjective outcomes between tibialis anterior allografts and patellar tendon allografts.

Allograft is typically reserved for lower demand patients over the age of 40. Data suggests that failure rates of allograft are higher compared to autograft in patients until the age of 40 when failure rates become similar.

=== Bridge Enhanced ACL Restoration (BEAR Implant) ===
In addition to traditional ACL reconstruction, alternative surgical approaches have been developed that aim to preserve and heal the patient’s native ACL rather than replacing it with a tendon graft. One such technique is Bridge-Enhanced ACL Restoration (BEAR), which uses a collagen implant placed between the torn ends of the ligament to facilitate healing. During the procedure, the implant is saturated with a small amount of the patient’s blood and secured with sutures to bridge the gap between the torn ligament ends. This creates a protected environment that supports healing of the native ligament. In contrast to ACL reconstruction, which replaces the torn ligament with autograft or allograft tissue, the BEAR procedure aims to restore the patient’s original ligament structure.

The technique was developed through research at Boston Children’s Hospital and Harvard Medical School investigating biological approaches to stimulate ACL healing. Much of the early research leading to the development of the BEAR technique was conducted by orthopedic surgeon and researcher Martha M. Murray, whose work focused on understanding why the ACL does not heal naturally and how biological scaffolds might enable ligament regeneration. The implant used in the procedure is manufactured by Miach Orthopaedics, a medical device company focused on facilitating connective tissue restoration.

Early clinical studies comparing BEAR with autograft ACL reconstruction reported comparable outcomes in knee stability and patient-reported function at two-year follow-up, with improved hamstring strength observed in some patients treated with the BEAR procedure. Additional clinical research is ongoing. The BEAR-MOON study, a multicenter clinical trial evaluating outcomes following BEAR, has completed patient enrollment and is continuing long-term follow-up. Miach Orthopaedics is also conducting additional studies, including the BEAR III trial and the Bridge Registry, to evaluate clinical outcomes and longer-term joint health following ACL repair using the BEAR technique.

The BEAR Implant received authorization from the U.S. Food and Drug Administration (FDA) in 2020 through the De Novo classification pathway for use in patients 14+ with a complete ACL tear. In 2025, the FDA cleared an expanded indication for use, allowing the implant to be used in a broader group of patients (ages 2+ , as well as those with partial tears) based on additional clinical evidence. In 2026, the FDA approved an updated label indicating a significantly lower observed risk of post-traumatic osteoarthritis in patients treated with the BEAR Implant compared with ACL reconstruction in clinical studies.

Studies have reported similar rates of return to sport following BEAR and ACL reconstruction in appropriately selected patients. Postoperative rehabilitation protocols for BEAR differ from those used after ACL reconstruction because the procedure aims to allow the native ligament to heal. Rehabilitation programs may emphasize protection of the healing ligament during the early postoperative period while gradually restoring knee motion, strength, and function before return to athletic activity.

=== Synthetic tissue: Ligament Advanced Reinforcement System (LARS) ===
The anterior cruciate ligament (ACL) of the knee is commonly injured. There is insufficient re-vascularization of the ligament after complete rupture, which limits its ability to heal and necessitates reconstruction surgery. Within the last 20 years, new types of synthetic ligaments have been developed. The Ligament Advanced Reinforcement System (LARS), is one of these new synthetic ligaments that has recently gained popularity. There is evidence that supports LARS as a viable option for reconstruction surgery in regards to complication rates and high patient satisfaction scores, when compared to traditional surgical techniques. However, systematic reviews of the LARS in regarding graft stability and long term functional outcomes, have highlighted several important gaps in existing literature that requires future investigation. The necessity of rehabilitation following LARS is well recognized, but there is limited evidence available that guide rehabilitation protocols.

=== Choice of graft type ===
Typically, age and lifestyle help determine the type of graft used for ACL reconstruction. The biggest factors in knee stability are correct graft placement by the surgeon and treatment of other menisco-ligament injuries in the knee, rather than type of graft. However, with the current literature, only KT-1000 arthrometer assessment demonstrated more laxity with allograft reconstruction. Bone-patellar tendon-bone grafts have resulted fewer failures and more stability on KT-1000 arthrometer testing.

== Surgical technique ==
=== All-inside ACL reconstruction technique ===
The all-inside anterior cruciate ligament reconstruction (ACLR) technique is considered state-of-the-art in many elite sports medicine practices. This minimally invasive technique, compatible with various grafts (e.g., hamstring autograft, quadriceps tendon), uses sockets rather than full tunnels on both the tibia and femur to preserve bone and reduce postoperative pain. Originally described by Morgan et al., the procedure was later modified by Dr. James H. Lubowitz who introduced a nonincisional variation in 2006. Initially, this method faced anatomical and biomechanical shortcomings, including risks associated with tunnel placement and graft fixation. Lubowitz and colleagues introduced a second-generation technique in 2011 using an outside-in technique for the creation of femoral sockets, flip-cutter for drilling tibial sockets, and adjustable loop cortical suspensory fixation. These refinements overcame previous complications and have subsequently contributed to broader adoption of the all-inside method in ACL reconstruction.

=== Additional Procedures ===
Many surgeons are now choosing to add either a lateral extra-articular tenodesis (LET) or a anterolateral ligament (ALL) reconstruction in addition to the ACL reconstruction. Both procedures are intended to help restore the natural kinematics of the knee which are disrupted with injury to the ACL.

== Stem cell treatment ==
Autologous stem-cell transplantation using mesenchymal stem cells (MSCs) has been used to improve recovery time from ACL surgery, especially for athletes. MSCs are multipotent stem cells, meaning they can differentiate into multiple cell types. In the case of mesenchymal stem cells, these cell types include osteoblasts (bone cells), adipocytes (fat cells), and chondrocytes (cartilage cells). Ligament tissue mainly consists of fibroblasts and extracellular matrix. Ligament cells differ in size, respond to different cues in the cell environment, and express different cell surface markers, limiting the number of clinical treatments for accelerated repair of ACL tissue to MSCs and primary fibroblasts obtained from other ACL tissue. Therefore, most modern stem cell injections use MSCs to promote faster repair of the ACL and allow people such as athletes to return to their previous form faster.

In order for MSCs to differentiate into an ACL, they must be placed in a proper scaffold on which to grow, and must be in a bioreactor that maintains a normal physiological environment for the cells to reproduce and proliferate effectively. The scaffold must have the mechanical properties of a healthy ACL to sustain the ligament while it is in its primary form and maintain normal knee movement. Scaffolds that are used for ACL growth include collagen, silk, gelatin, polylactic acid, and glycosaminoglycans. Mechanical properties of the scaffolds are further enhanced through braiding and twisting of the scaffold materials.

The bioreactor must have similar properties to a knee joint so that when the ACL is inserted into the body, it is not rejected as foreign, which could cause infection. Therefore, it has to have compatible pH levels, oxygen concentration levels, metabolite levels and temperature, in addition to being sterile.

== Recovery ==
Initial physical therapy consists of range of motion (ROM) exercises, often with the guidance of a physical therapist. Range of motion exercises are used to regain the flexibility of the ligament, prevent or break down scar tissue from forming and reduce loss of muscle tone. Range of motion exercise examples include: quadriceps contractions and straight leg raises. In some cases, a continuous passive motion (CPM) device is used immediately after surgery to help with flexibility. The preferred method of preventing muscle loss is isometric exercises that put zero strain on the knee. Knee extension within two weeks is important with many rehab guidelines.

Perturbation training can help improve gait asymmetries of the knee joint.

Approximately six weeks is required for the bone to attach to the graft. However, the patient can typically walk on their own and perform simple physical tasks prior to this with caution, relying on the surgical fixation of the graft until true healing (graft attachment to bone) has taken place. At this stage, the first round of physical therapy can begin. This usually consists of careful exercises to regain flexibility and small amounts of strength. One of the more important benchmarks in recovery is the twelve weeks post-surgery period. After this, the patient can typically begin a more aggressive regimen of exercises involving stress on the knee, and increasing resistance. Jogging may be incorporated as well.

After four months, more intense activities such as running are possible without risk. After five months, light ball work may commence as the ligament is nearly regenerated. After six months, the reconstructed ACL is generally at full strength (ligament tissue has fully regrown), and the patient may return to activities involving cutting and twisting if a brace is worn. Although athletes can start progressing in their activity level at an earlier time frame, the recommended time frame to return to sport is 9-12 months. Even with this recovery time frame, only 55-79% of athletes return to their past functional level of sport.

=== Risks ===
If the proper rehabilitation procedure is not followed out post surgery, the ACL becomes less mobile and the bones begin to rub against each other. The abnormal bone movement can also damage the tissue, this damage can lead to osteoarthritis. If the proper rehabilitation regimen is not followed, chances of reinjury increase. Correlational analysis studies show that greater attendance at rehab sessions correspond with fewer reported symptoms in the surgical knee. However, this does also depend on the quality of the physical therapist or athletic trainer. Fear is a known factor in recovery and return to sport as well, with studies showing that greater self-reported levels of fear in an athlete while rehabbing had lower scores on hop tests and quadriceps strength symmetry, increasing the risk of reinjury.

== Rehabilitation ==
The recovery process for the ACL is usually broken down into different phases of rehabilitation. Each phase has its own objectives, however is intertwined with other phases since the goals are as progressive as the recovery itself. The rehabilitation process is at the pace of the patient. It is also important to take the patients mental health into account. The rehab and recovery is very demanding. With this being said, it can often lead to depressive disorders, mood changes, and low self-esteem. Timelines are sometimes given to help give an idea of where one can be during rehabilitation. Timelines are not used to discourage or encourage those who are not ready to advance their recovery process. Such acts may cause serious injury or re-injury of the ACL.

=== Pre-rehabilitation ===
Pre-rehabilitation before ACL reconstruction surgery has been shown to help with recovery post operation. Increased knee extensor strength and range of motion for those who participated in a pre-rehabilitation program in the first 3 to 6 weeks, but no significant change at 3 to 6 months.

=== Phase 1 ===
This phase begins immediately post surgery while the patient is still on crutches and in a removable knee brace, which they're projected to be using for seven to ten days. During this phase the patient will begin seeing a physical therapist that will discuss the main goals of rehabilitation. Some of these goals include: reducing pain and inflammation, increasing range of motion, strengthening surrounding muscles, and beginning weight bearing exercises. Generally, in Phase 1 strengthening consists of isometric exercises. Extension deficit is a frequent issue after surgery and is often related to arthrogenic muscle inhibition. Specific exercises and cryotherapy are proven to be effective in addressing arthrogenic muscle inhibition. If the patient used a patellar tendon graft for their reconstructed ACL, therapist will also work on mobilizing the patellar tendon to keep it from shortening.

Some equipment that can be used and exercises that can be performed are:

  - Use of cryo-cuff
    - provides cold compression
  - Isometric contraction of quads
  - Quad sets
    - stand against wall, push extended knee against rolled towel
    - progress to straight leg raised to 30deg.
  - Wall slides
    - To increase knee flexion
  - Assisted knee flexion
  - Towel squeeze
    - Sit in chair, squeeze rolled towel between knees for 5 seconds. Relax & repeat.
  - VMO strengthening exercise
  - Supported bilateral calf-raises
  - Walk without crutches
  - Swimming (freestyle front crawl)

This particular swimming technique encompasses all the muscles in the knee and will increase not only mobility but also the strength of the surrounding muscles, which include the quadriceps, hamstrings, gastrocnemius, tibialis anterior (shin muscle), abductor hallucis, abductor digiti minimi, and flexor digitorum brevis (foot muscles).

=== Phase 2 ===
Many of the goals from phase I will be continued to the following phases until they have been reached. Some of these goals are reducing pain, swelling, and increasing the knee's range of motion is still crucial during this phase. Physical therapist may begin to incorporate core exercises as well as light weight exercises to strengthen the surrounding muscles and hips. Some examples of these exercises include the usage of resistance/stretch bands, stationary biking, and elliptical. During this phase the patient may begin performing more strenuous exercises such as half-squatting and partial lunges.

Some exercises that can be performed are:

  - Mini squats
    - Progress to full squats → single-leg half squat
  - Mini lunges
    - Progress to full lunges
  - Leg press
    - Double-leg → single
  - Step-ups
  - Bridges
    - Double-leg → single
    - Floor → Swiss ball
  - Hip abduction w/ Theraband
  - Hip extension w/ Theraband
  - Wobble board
    - Assisted → un-assisted → eyes closed (assisted → unassisted)
  - Stork stand
    - Assisted → un-assisted → eyes closed (assisted → unassisted) → unstable surface
  - Static proprioceptive hold/ball throwing
  - Functional exercises that can be performed at this time include:
    - Walking
    - Bike
    - Roman chair

=== Phase 3 ===
Patients will continue to work on decreasing pain/swelling and building up their strength. Lateral movement, jogging in a straight line, single-leg squats and exercises will start to be incorporated as patient begins to regain confidence in the knee. Building strength in the hips with lateral stepping as well as step-ups and step-downs will still be a strong focus in this phase.

Some exercises that can be performed are

  - Continue exercises from Phase 2, progress as necessary
  - Jump & land drills
    - Jump from block & stick landing
    - Double-leg landing → single-leg
  - Plyometric drills
    - Jumping over blocks, sideways & forward
    - Hopping up & down steps/stairs

Return to running can begin when certain criteria are met including:

- Knee flexion range of motion (ROM) to 95% of full range.
- Knee extension ROM to full range.
- No effusion or trace of effusion.
- Quadriceps strength is greater than 80% on the limb symmetry index (LSI).
- Eccentric impulse is greater than 80% on LSI during countermovement jump.
- Pain-free running in an anti-gravity treadmill and pain-free aqua jogging.
- Repeating single-leg hops pain-free.

=== Phase 4 ===
By this time the range of motion should be greater than 110 degrees flexed and the patient's bodily mechanics like walking and light jogging should be back to normal (before operation). Single leg exercises will be continued as well as balancing activities to strengthen the core and lower body. Stamina and endurance should be improved for exercises such as biking, jogging, and step-ups/downs. If by this time the patient does not have 110 degrees of flexion in the knee, they are advised to see their therapist or surgeon. There is a chance that the knee could need another operation to increase the elasticity of the ligament.

The goal of this phase is a return to activity, however it requires an ability to perform some functional performance tests such as:

- Agility tests
  - Illinois Agility Test
  - Zig zag agility test

These tests are used to test the ability of the knee to withstand cutting and planting maneuvers.

- Single leg step-down tests: These tests can be used to identify any hip and core musculature weaknesses before cleared for return-to-play.
  - Standing vertical jump:The patient jumps straight in the air from a standing start and lands on two feet as stable as possible.
  - Heiden hop test: The patient jumps as far as possible with the uninjured leg and lands on the injured leg. A patient's ability to stick the landing is indicative of good knee function.
- Isokinetic testing
  - This is used to evaluate muscle strength.
  - The individual should have at least 90% quadricep strength of the uninjured leg.
  - They should also have equal hamstring strength to their uninjured leg as well.

=== Phase 5 ===
This is the last phase of the recovery rehabilitation. Phase V includes returning to sports after being cleared by therapist or surgeon. In order for this to happen the patient must have full range of motion, continue maintaining strength and endurance, and be able to increase proprioception with agility drills. The patient is still to be aware that going down hill or down stairs while the knee is aggravated may cause further injury like a meniscus tear.

The patient can be cleared for return to sport when they meet the following criteria:

- No pain or swelling in the knee.
- Full ROM of the knee.
- The knee is stable.
- Reports of normal knee function and psychological readiness from the patient.
- Isokinetic hamstring and quadriceps strength should be 100% symmetrical at peak torque at 60°/s.
- When jumping, values should be absolute and symmetric for vertical and horizontal jumps at the hip, knee, and ankle.
- When running, greater than 90% symmetry should be restored of vertical ground reaction forces as well as knee biomechanics during direction changes and high speed running.
- Completion of a sports specific training program.

== Cost of procedure ==
The cost of an ACL reconstruction surgery will vary due to a few different reasons such as where a patient lives, which graft is used, if the meniscus is also torn, and the coverage of the patient's insurance. A study has shown in 2016 that metropolitan areas, of at least one million residents, located on the western coast of the United States of America and areas like Minnesota, Indiana, and Michigan were more expensive than the East and South East coast of the United States. Another study, conducted by Baylor University, found that ACL reconstruction procedures using the bone-patella tendon-bone technique took 2.5 hours longer than using a hamstring graft. The operation room costs and hospital charges for that amount of extra time came to about $1,580 more expensive. This also applies to having a torn meniscus during the procedure. Fixing the torn cartilage will increase the procedure time, increasing cost. Insurance plays the biggest role in cost for an ACL reconstruction since that it will be covering majority of the costs. The coverage of a patient's plan, deductibles, and insurance company will determine how much the patient will pay in copays.

Despite the complexity of the procedure and numerous doctor's visits involved, 80–90% of patients who have had the surgery said they had favorable results.

== ACL repair ==
ACL repair is also a surgical option. This involves repairing the ACL by re-attaching it using sutures, instead of performing a reconstruction using new material. ACL repair as a technique is older than ACL reconstruction.

With the modernized form of ACL repair (still using sutures), theoretical advantages of repair include faster recovery and a lack of donor site morbidity, but randomised controlled trials and long-term data regarding re-rupture rates using contemporary surgical techniques are lacking. "Failure rates for ACL repair appear to be between 5 and 10 times higher than those for ACL reconstruction in people of all ages. This results in graft failure rates as high as 50% in adolescent patients."

The § Bridge Enhanced ACL Restoration (BEAR Implant) mentioned above is also a type of repair, though with added "bridging" material.
