= International Society of Arthroscopy, Knee Surgery and Orthopaedic Sports Medicine =

Professional medical organisation

The International Society of Arthroscopy, Knee Surgery and Orthopaedic Sports Medicine (ISAKOS) is an international medical society with around 4,000 members. The membership comprises mostly orthopaedic surgeons along with sports scientists, sports physicians and sports physical therapists. The members are from 100+ different countries and are members of their local orthopaedic sports medicine societies or similar associations. Members may also be associated with their global regional orthopaedic sports medicine society such as the Arthroscopy Association of North America, the American Orthopaedic Society for Sports Medicine (AOSSM), the Asia-Pacific Knee, Arthroscopy and Sports Medicine Society, the European Society for Sports Traumatology, Knee Surgery and Arthroscopy and the Sociedad Latinoamericana de Artroscopia, Rodilla y Deporte in particular.

The purpose of ISAKOS is to act as an umbrella association for these regional societies to provide a means for exchange of knowledge between them and, most importantly, to promote education in the fields of knee surgery and orthopaedic sports medicine to those areas of the world where such educational opportunities are lacking. ISAKOS achieves these goals through the involvement of members in educational meetings, sponsoring of visitations by surgeons from poorer countries to centres of excellence along with other awards, scholarships and endorsements of regional meetings.

Arthroscopy (also called arthroscopic surgery) is a minimally invasive surgical procedure on a joint in which a treatment or just an examination is performed using an arthroscope, an endoscope that is inserted into the joint through a small incision.

Sports medicine, also known as sport and exercise medicine (SEM), is a part of medicine that deals with the prevention and treatment of injuries related to sports and exercise.

== History ==
ISAKOS was formed in 1995, in Hong Kong, at the combined congress of the International Arthroscopy Association (IAA) and the International Society of the Knee (ISK). These two societies previously held meetings 'back to back' and as most delegates attended both it became a logical step to combine them. ISAKOS is the union of these International societies (IAA and ISK). ISAKOS holds an international Congress every two years. Since its founding in 1995, these Congress meetings have been held throughout the world. The first president of ISAKOS was Dr. Peter J. Fowler of Canada, in the years 1995 to 1997.

For the 2015–17 term, the society was chaired by Dr. Philippe Neyret of France, followed by Dr. Marc Safran of the USA from 2017–19. The society is currently chaired by Dr. Willem van der Merwe of South Africa, who will hold the post until 2021.

== Membership ==
ISAKOS is an international society of individuals interested in Sports Orthopaedics and the fields of medicine and science related to that. These include knee surgery, arthroscopic surgery of all joints and orthopaedic sports medicine. It is very common for those applying for membership to also be a member of one of the major regional Associations. These are the Arthroscopy Association of North America (AANA), the American Orthopaedic Society for Sports Medicine (AOSSM), the Asia-Pacific Knee, Arthroscopy and Sports Medicine Society (APKASS), the European Society for Sports Traumatology, Knee Surgery and Arthroscopy (ESSKA) and the Sociedad Latinoamericana de Artroscopia, Rodilla y Deporte (SLARD). Members are also members of their regional or National orthopaedic sports medicine society (or equivalent). Indeed, members of these Associations may gain Associate Membership of ISAKOS immediately on application.

There are three primary membership categories:

Associate Members

Those with an interest or ability in the fields of medicine or science with an interest in arthroscopy, knee surgery, and orthopaedic sports medicine shall be eligible. These members are not entitled to vote and are not eligible to hold office.

Active Members

Individuals qualified as orthopaedic surgeons, musculoskeletal surgeons, rheumatologists or the equivalent in their home countries and who are in good medical standing in their national or regional association as determined by the membership committee of the ISAKOS. Active members are entitled to vote at all meetings of the membership and are eligible to hold office in the society. Active Membership is awarded pending an application review at a meeting of the Membership Committee.

In-Training Members

Individuals currently enrolled in Residency or Fellowship Program, as well as Medical Students, are eligible for up to five years of free In-Training Membership.

== Awards ==
ISAKOS offers a number of awards. These awards are for original papers in the various categories which are submitted for the biennial Congress. The awards are presented at the Congress and notified in the Society Newsletter and on the ISAKOS website.

Many of the Awards honour prominent present and past ISAKOS members and past notable doyens of sports surgery while others offer financial support for research, Fellowships and attendance at various ISAKOS sponsored meetings.

In keeping with the fundamental mission of ISAKOS some preference is given to supporting research and scholarships to individuals from countries where such opportunities may not have otherwise been available.

These awards include;

Awards

- John J. Joyce Award - For the best arthroscopy paper
- Richard B. Caspari Award - For the best upper extremity paper
- Jan I. Gillquist Scientific Award - For the best scientific research
- Gary G. Poehling Award Award - For the best elbow, wrist and hand paper
- Albert Trillat Young Investigator's Award - For the best young clinical researcher
- Achilles Orthopaedic Sports Medicine Research Award - For the best Sports Medicine research
- Paolo Aglietti Award - For the best Knee Arthroplasty research
- The Patellofemoral Research Excellence Award - For the best Patellofemoral Research

Fellowships and Scholarships

- ISAKOS Global Traveling Fellowship
- The Patellofemoral Traveling Fellowship
- International Sports Medicine Fellows Conference Scholarship
- Teaching Centre Scholarship
- ISAKOS Clinical Funded Research Session
- ISAKOS Young Investigator's Scholarship & Research Mentoring Program

Applications for these Awards and Scholarships are usually invited a year before the Biennial Congress.

== Educational activities ==
The primary focus of ISAKOS is education in the fields of Orthopaedic Sports Medicine, Arthroscopy and Knee Surgery. It achieves this goal by 4 means; the Biennial ISAKOS Congress, focussed expert consensus meetings resulting in a publication, instructional courses and surgical techniques available on the ISAKOS website and involvement with approval of many other courses with similar educational intent throughout the world. ISAKOS also allows branding of Fellowship programs and financially supports specific educational Travelling Fellowships.

The Biennial Congress

This is the most important event in the ISAKOS calendar and much activity centres on the planning and organisation of this International Congress. Many of the ISAKOS Committees have input into the structure, format and content of the Congress with the oversight of the Program Committee and the Program Chair. The Congress is a forum for free papers and abstracts are required usually 12 months in advance.

In addition, the Congress also includes Instructional Courses on specific topics led by International experts along with Symposia on topics of current interest. In recent years the Congress has expanded to include live surgical demonstrations and 'Hands on Workshops'.

Poster presentations are now presented electronically and delegates receive an electronic copy of these with their registration. More recently the Congress has also made available a dedicated app which allows delegates to preview abstracts and plan their involvement at the Congress.

The Congress also includes sessions for debates on current issues, technical exhibits and time for networking which is so important in developing International professional contacts and acquaintances.

The biennial ISAKOS Congress is usually held for a total of five days, during the months of May or June. Several ISAKOS Awards for outstanding clinical or laboratory research are presented during this meeting. The most recent ISAKOS meeting was held in 2017 in Shanghai, China, and involved over 4000 attendees from 84 countries presenting 256 papers and 753 E-posters.

ISAKOS also supports and collaborates on several other meetings throughout the year focusing on knee injuries or other sports related areas of interest. In addition, the Society provides accreditation for numerous other educational courses all over the world.

Focussed Expert Consensus Meetings

The Clinical Committees of ISAKOS are made up of multinational members with common interests. This provides a forum for discussion and often resolution of many issues relevant to that speciality. Often the Committee will convene a meeting to resolve a specific issue or discuss a specific topic. Experts from around the world, whether ISAKOS members or not, are invited to these meetings and a consensus is usually developed.

These consensus meetings usually result in a publication on the topic. Such international consensus on a controversial topic is a much more considered resolution of an issue than the opinions of a single expert.

A number of ISAKOS derived publications of the outcomes of consensus meetings are available to members, many of which have been published in respected orthopaedic literature.

Instructional Course Lectures and Surgical Technique Videos

Through the ISAKOS website and the Global link members are able to view many Instructional videos on current topics. Surgical technique videos are also available. Many of these have been recorded during previous Congress sessions and others have been supplied by individual surgeons for the benefit of ISAKOS members.

ISAKOS Approved Courses

Regional societies have their local meetings attracting their members and other delegates from locally or from other countries. These local societies can apply to ISAKOS for approval of their program. This is determined by the Scientific Committee and if approval is granted then this can be advertised by the regional society. The expectation is that such approval offers a degree of enhanced credibility to the scientific nature of the approved meeting.
