= Isokinetic Medical Group =

Italian sports medicine and orthopaedic rehabilitation company

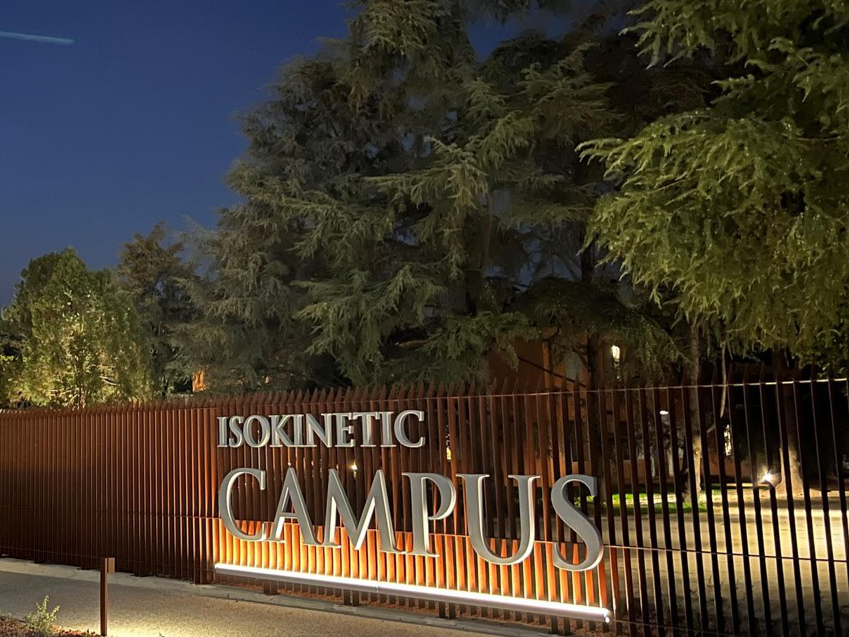
- Isokinetic Campus in Bologna
- Trade name: Isokinetic
- Native name: Isokinetic Medical Group S.r.l.
- Company type: Private
- Industry: Healthcare
- Founded: August 1987; 38 years ago in Bologna, Italy
- Founder: Stefano Della Villa
- Headquarters: Bologna, Italy
- Number of locations: 10 physical clinics, 1 virtual clinic (2024)
- Area served: Clinics in Italy, United Kingdom, Greece
- Key people: Stefano Della Villa (President), Marco Della Villa (CEO)
- Services: Sports medicine, orthopaedic rehabilitation, telemedicine
- Revenue: €24.9 million (2024)
- Number of employees: 160 (2024)
- Website: www.isokinetic.com

Isokinetic Medical Group is an Italian healthcare company headquartered in Bologna, Italy. It provides sports medicine and orthopaedic rehabilitation services.

== History ==
=== Origins and early operations (1987–1999) ===
Isokinetic Medical Group was founded in August 1987 in Bologna, Italy, by Stefano Della Villa and other colleagues. The company was named after the isokinetic machine, a medical device utilized to measure dynamic muscle strength. Della Villa had previously studied this method during a sports medicine fellowship alongside Richard Eagleston and Michael Dillingham, sports medicine program director at Stanford University.

In 1990, the first clinic relocated to Casteldebole, an area adjacent to the training grounds of Bologna FC. During its early years, the centre began to manage, through one of its founding partners, the sports medicine physician Gianni Nanni, the rehabilitation of professional athletes, including Italian footballer Eraldo Pecci, who returned to play 11 days after a meniscus operation in 1988.

In 1992, the organization hosted its first International Congress of Sport Rehabilitation and Traumatology, which subsequently evolved into an annual global conference focused on football medicine.

=== Domestic expansion and clinical research (2000–2008) ===
The company established the Isokinetic Education and Research Department in 2000, co-founded with physiologist Giulio Sergio Roi, to coordinate its clinical research output. Through the 2000s, the group published peer-reviewed research in independent medical journals analyzing biomechanics, non-contact injury mechanisms, and anterior cruciate ligament (ACL) rehabilitation protocols.

Between 2001 and 2008, Isokinetic expanded its domestic operations by opening clinics in Milan, Turin, Verona, Rome, and Rimini. The clinical network continued treating elite athletes across multiple sports, enabling Roberto Baggio to return to international football following an ACL rupture in 2002. The clinics also managed rehabilitation protocols for Olympic skier Alberto Tomba and Football World Cup champions Gianluigi Buffon, Luca Toni, and Filippo Inzaghi.

=== International accreditation and global presence (2009–2020) ===
In 2009, Isokinetic was accredited as the first Italian FIFA Medical Centre of Excellence, becoming the ninth center globally and the fourth in Europe to receive this designation. The company expanded internationally by opening its first overseas clinic on Harley Street in London in 2012.. During this period, they expanded to also treat basketball players, among them Danilo Gallinari, Marco Belinelli, and Miloš Teodosić.

In 2012, in partnership with the FIFA Medical Assessment and Research Centre (F-MARC), the company organized the 21st edition of its annual football medicine conference at Stamford Bridge in London. This marked the first time the event was hosted outside of Italy. The following year, the 2013 conference was held at Wembley Stadium in collaboration with The Football Association.

The group introduced its "Green Room" biomechanics laboratory to its clinics in 2016.

In 2016, a collaboration with FC Barcelona was announced to advance sports medicine and athlete rehabilitation and foster projects such as the "FCBarcelona Universitas," aiming to safeguard the physical integrity of elite athletes. The partnership also involved the organization of the 2017 and 2018 editions of "The Future of Football Medicine" conferences at Camp Nou.

=== Global education program in sports medicine (2021–present) ===
In 2021, after the retirement of Giulio Sergio Roi, Francesco Della Villa started to serve as Scientific Director, expanding research and education in sports injury video analysis, biomechanics, and prevention. In 2023, the company opened the Isokinetic Campus, a specialized training and cultural facility in Bologna.

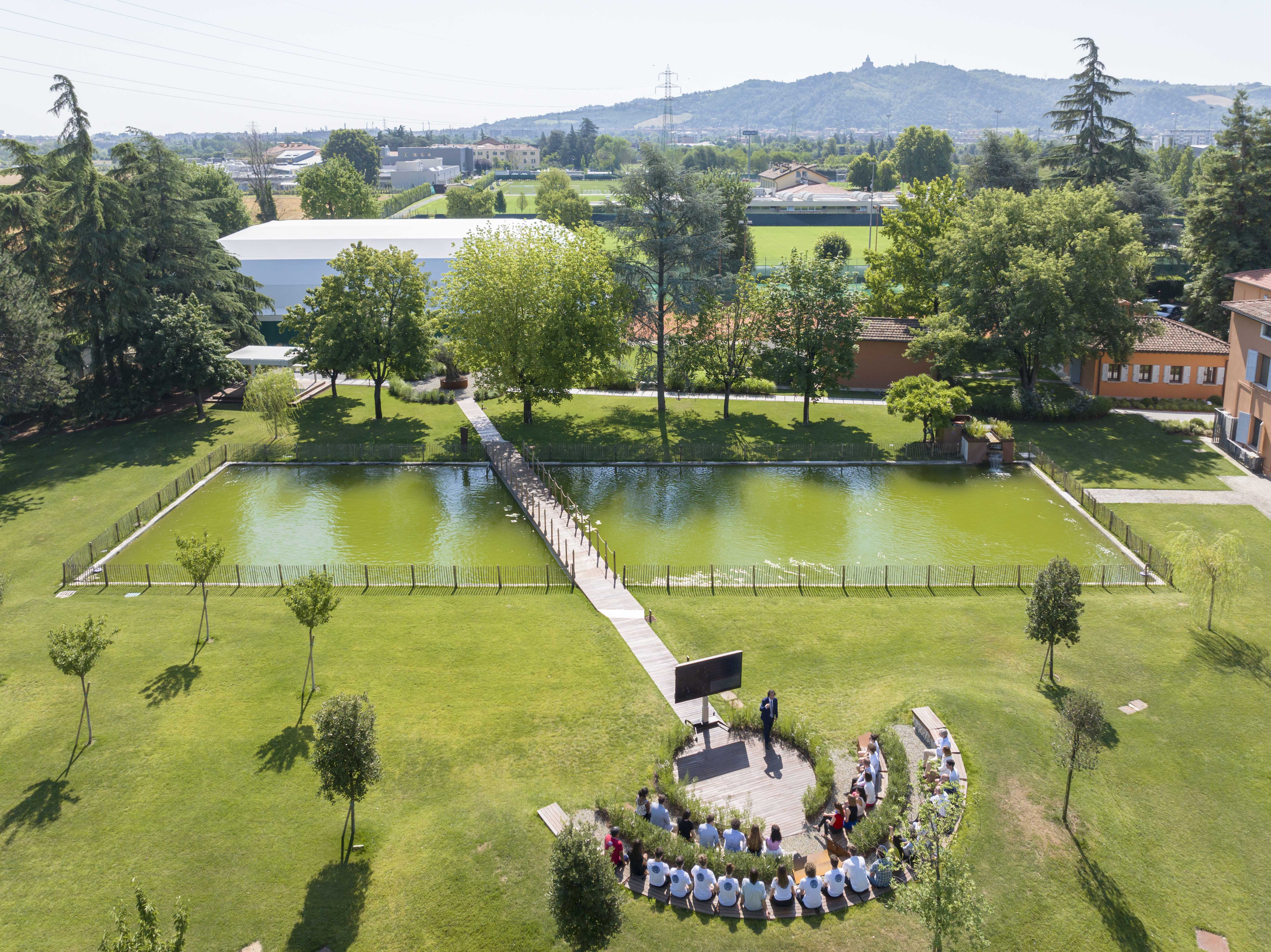
Isokinetic Campus in 2024

Expansion continued in 2024 with the opening of a clinic within the Athens Olympic Sports Complex in Athens, Greece. A third Milan clinic was opened in the Porta Nuova district in 2025. In 2026, the company became the official medical partner of the Motorcycle Grand Prix Ducati Lenovo Team.

== Products and services ==
Isokinetic Medical Group provides medical and rehabilitative services focused strictly on orthopaedics and sports medicine:

- Orthopaedic and sports rehabilitation: The company utilizes a multi-phase recovery model that transitions patients from clinical pain management and muscle strengthening to on-field workload conditioning. The clinical approach involves comprehensive sports medicine profile testing to customize reconditioning programs after injury, alongside proactive injury prevention based on the FIFA 11+ programme developed by the FIFA Medical Assessment and Research Centre (F-MARC).
- The Green Room: A patented biomechanics laboratory that conducts the Movement Analysis Test (M.A.T.). It employs visual biofeedback displayed on a video wall to analyze patient movement patterns and facilitate neuromotor re-education.
- Virtual+: A telemedicine platform offering remote medical consultations and monitored telerehabilitation sessions, launched in 2020 in response to the COVID-19 pandemic.
- Professional athlete services: In 2023, the company launched a dedicated clinical program to oversee the rehabilitation of elite athletes from injury to return to play. The service coordinates personalized medical care with regular progress reporting to the athlete's club and stakeholders to facilitate a structured recovery.
- Isokinetic Conference: An annual medical conference focused on football medicine and athletic rehabilitation, organized in partnership with the FIFA Medical Department.

== Corporate affairs ==
Isokinetic Medical Group operates as a private holding company under the legal entity Isokinetic Medical Group S.r.l., which maintains full ownership over its regional subsidiaries and operating clinics.

As of December 31, 2024, the company reported €24.9 million in consolidated revenue. During the same reporting period, its direct workforce consisted of 160 employees and an additional 47 non-employee clinical collaborators. In 2024, the group published its inaugural Sustainability Report, outlining internal corporate governance, energy consumption metrics, and workplace diversity practices. The same year, the clinics treated over 16,000 patients of all ages.
