= Willem van der Merwe =

South African cricketer and orthopaedic surgeon

Personal information
- Full name: Willem Maré van der Merwe
- Born: 20 July 1960; Rustenburg, Transvaal, South Africa
- Died: 31 March 2025 (aged 64); Cape Town, Western Cape, Republic of South Africa
- Batting: Left-handed
- Bowling: Right-arm medium-fast

Domestic team information
- Years: Team
- 1978/79–1984/85: Orange Free State
- 1985/86–1986/87: Western Province
- 1985/86–1986/87: Western Province B
- 1990: Oxford University

Career statistics
Competition	First-class	List A
Matches	44	11
Runs scored	1,274	161
Batting average	24.50	20.12
100s/50s	–/7	–/–
Top score	96	44*
Balls bowled	6,805	591
Wickets	130	18
Bowling average	26.06	23.27
5 wickets in innings	4	–
10 wickets in match	–	–
Best bowling	5/35	4/49
Catches/stumpings	14/–	5/–
- Source: Cricinfo, 7 September 2019

Willem Maré van der Merwe (20 July 1960 – 31 March 2025) was a South African orthopaedic surgeon and cricketer. Van der Merwe was a professional cricketer in South Africa from 1978 to 1987, playing predominantly for Orange Free State and Western Province. He later played first-class cricket in England for Oxford University and became a surgeon. He served as president of the International Society of Arthroscopy, Knee Surgery and Orthopaedic Sports Medicine (ISAKOS).

== Early life and cricket career ==
Van der Merwe was born in Rustenburg in July 1960 and studied medicine at the University of the Free State. He made his debut in first-class cricket for Orange Free State against Griqualand West at Blomfontein in the 1978–79 Castle Bowl. He played first-class cricket for Orange Free State until the 1984–85 Castle Bowl, making 26 appearances. Playing as an all-rounder, he scored 622 runs for Orange Free State, at an average of 19.43 and a high score of 96. With his right-arm medium-fast bowling, he took 93 wickets at a bowling average of 23.76. He took five wickets in an innings on three occasions, with best figures of 5 for 40 against Boland in the 1983–84 Castle Bowl. It was for Orange Free State that he made his debut in List A one-day cricket in the 1981–82 Datsun Shield, with van der Merwe making five List A appearances between the 1981–82 and 1984–85 seasons.

He moved to Western Province for the 1985–86 seasons, playing nine first-class matches for the Western Province B team and making two List A appearances for the main Western Province team. He scored 320 runs in his nine matches, averaging 22.85 and with a high score of 79 not out, while with the ball he took 34 wickets at an average of 20.82, with best figures of 5 for 35. His final first-class match in South Africa came for the South African Defence Force cricket team against Natal in September 1987, when he was conscripted in the South African Defence Force.

== Oxford University and medical career ==
He travelled to England in 1989 to study social studies at the University of Oxford, where he attended St Anne's College. While studying at Oxford, he made six first-class appearances for Oxford University in 1990, and played for the combined Oxford and Cambridge Universities cricket team against the touring New Zealanders. He scored 272 runs for Oxford in his six matches and averaged 68.00, making three half centuries in the process. In addition to playing first-class cricket while at Oxford, he also appeared in four List A matches for the Combined Universities cricket team in the 1990 Benson & Hedges Cup.

Returning to South Africa, van der Merwe made no further appearances in senior domestic cricket. He became a noted orthopaedic surgeon in Cape Town, and served as president of the South African Society of Arthroscopy, Knee Surgery and Orthopaedic Sports Medicine and as the international president of ISAKOS from 2019 to 2021.

In March 2025, van der Merwe died of esophageal cancer at the age of 64.
