= Knee Surgery, Sports Traumatology, Arthroscopy =

Knee Surgery, Sports Traumatology, Arthoscopy
- Discipline: Orthopedic surgery
- Language: English
- Edited by: Jon Karlsson

Publication details
- History: 1993-present
- Publisher: Springer Science+Business Media
- Frequency: Monthly
- Impact factor: 4.342 (2020)

Standard abbreviations
- ISO 4: Knee Surg. Sports Traumatol. Arthrosc.

Indexing
- ISSN: 0942-2056 (print); 1433-7347 (web)
- OCLC no.: 488595845

Links
- Journal homepage; Online archive

The Knee Surgery, Sports Traumatology, Arthroscopy is a monthly peer-reviewed medical journal published in English covering orthopaedic surgery, especially related to sports trauma and surgeries, in particular arthroscopies and knee surgery.

The journal is the official journal of the European Society of Sports Traumatology, Knee Surgery and Arthroscopy . It was established in 1992 with Ejnar Eriksson as founding editor-in-chief for the first 16 years. He was succeeded by Jon Karlsson (University of Gothenburg) and René Verdonk (Ghent University) in 2008. In 2012, Verdonk became Senior Editor and Jon Karlsson the sole editor-in-chief. While the journal was originally published as three relatively thin issues in 1993, its publication frequency increased gradually to the current 12 issues per year with about 300 pages per issue.

== Abstracting and indexing ==
The journal is abstracted and indexed in:

- Science Citation Index
- PubMed/MEDLINE
- Scopus
- EMBASE
- EBSCO databases
- Academic OneFile
- CINAHL
- Current Contents/Clinical Medicine
- EMCare

According to the Journal Citation Reports, the journal has a 2014 impact factor of 3.053, ranking it 7th out of 72 journals in the category "Orthopaedics", 9th out of 81 journals in the category "Sport Sciences", and 31st out of 198 journals in the category "Surgery".
