= Cartilage (journal) =

- Discipline: Sports medicine
- Language: English
- Edited by: Mats Brittberg

Publication details
- History: 2010–present
- Publisher: Sage Publishing
- Frequency: Quarterly

Standard abbreviations
- ISO 4: Cartilage

Indexing
- ISSN: 1947-6035
- OCLC no.: 315863236

Links
- Journal homepage; Online access; Online archive

Cartilage is a quarterly peer-reviewed medical journal that covers research in the field of sports medicine, especially the musculoskeletal system with particular attention to cartilage repair, function, and degeneration. The editor-in-chief is Mats Brittberg. It was established in 2010 and is published by Sage Publishing on behalf of the International Cartilage Repair Society.

== Abstracting and indexing ==
The journal is abstracted and indexed in Chemical Abstracts and Scopus.
