= Sports Health =

- Discipline: Sports medicine
- Language: English
- Edited by: Edward M. Wojtys

Publication details
- History: 2009-present
- Publisher: SAGE Publications
- Frequency: Bimonthly

Standard abbreviations
- ISO 4: Sports Health

Indexing
- ISSN: 1941-7381 (print); 1941-0921 (web)
- LCCN: 2008214446
- OCLC no.: 213413999

Links
- Journal homepage; Online access; Online archive

Sports Health: A Multidisciplinary Approach is a bimonthly peer-reviewed medical journal that covers research in the field of sports medicine. Its editor-in-chief is Edward M. Wojtys (University of Michigan). The journal was established in 2009 and is currently published by SAGE Publications in association with the American Orthopedic Society for Sports Medicine.

== Abstracting and indexing ==
Sports Health is abstracted and indexed in CAB International, SafetyLit, and Scopus.
