= The American Journal of Sports Medicine =

- Discipline: Health Sciences
- Language: English
- Edited by: Bruce Reider, MD

Publication details
- History: 1976–present
- Publisher: SAGE Publications (United Kingdom)
- Frequency: Monthly
- Impact factor: 6.057 (2017)

Standard abbreviations
- ISO 4: Am. J. Sports Med.

Indexing
- ISSN: 0363-5465 (print); 1552-3365 (web)
- LCCN: 76646332
- OCLC no.: 2314681

Links
- Journal homepage; Online access; Online archive

The American Journal of Sports Medicine is a peer-reviewed academic journal that publishes papers in the field of Sport Sciences. The journal's editor is Bruce Reider, MD. It has been in publication since 1972 and is currently published by SAGE Publications in association with American Orthopedic Society for Sports Medicine.

== Scope ==
The American Journal of Sports Medicine is a source of information for sports medicine specialists with the aim of improving the identification, prevention, treatment and rehabilitation of sports injuries. The journal acts as a forum for orthopaedic sports medicine research and education, allowing clinical practitioners the ability to make decisions based on scientific information.

== Abstracting and indexing ==
The American Journal of Sports Medicine is abstracted and indexed in, among other databases: SCOPUS, and the Social Sciences Citation Index. According to the Journal Citation Reports, its 2014 impact factor is 4.362, ranking it 1 out of 72 journals in the category 'Orthopedics'. and 6 out of 81 journals in the category 'Sport Sciences'. The journal's 5-Year Impact Factor is currently listed at 5.084.
