= Arthroscopy (journal) =

- Discipline: Orthopedic surgery
- Language: English
- Edited by: Michael J. Rossi

Publication details
- History: 1985–present
- Publisher: Wiley
- Frequency: Monthly
- Impact factor: 6.9 (2025)

Standard abbreviations
- ISO 4: Arthroscopy

Indexing
- CODEN: ARTHE3
- ISSN: 0749-8063 (print); 1526-3231 (web)
- OCLC no.: 11198618

Links
- Journal homepage; Online access; Online archive

Arthroscopy: The Journal of Arthroscopic and Related Surgery is a peer-reviewed medical journal that was established in 1985 and covers research on the clinical practice of arthroscopic and minimally invasive surgery, a subspecialty of orthopaedic surgery. It is the official journal of the Arthroscopy Association of North America. The first editor-in-chief was S. Ward Casscells, who was succeeded in 1992 by Gary G. Poehling. In 2014 James H. Lubowitz succeeded Dr. Poehling, and in 2025, Michael J. Rossi was named editor. Arthroscopy Techniques is an open access online companion journal publishing peer-reviewed techniques videos. Arthroscopy, Sports Medicine, and Rehabilitation is another open access online companion journal.

== Abstracting and indexing ==
The journal is abstracted and indexed by MEDLINE, Web of Science, and Scopus.
