= American Orthopaedic Society for Sports Medicine =

The American Orthopaedic Society for Sports Medicine (AOSSM) promotes sports medicine education, research, communication, and fellowship and includes national and international orthopaedic sports medicine leaders. The Society works closely with many other sports medicine specialists, including athletic trainers, physical therapists, family physicians, and others to improve the identification, prevention, treatment, and rehabilitation of sports injuries. Formed in 1972 as a forum for education and research with 100 members, the AOSSM today has to more than 2,000 members.

== AOSSM History ==
The AOSSM developed out of the American Academy of Orthopaedic Surgeons’ (AAOS) Committee on Sports Medicine. The committee was organized in 1964 with Jack Hughston as Chairman. Throughout the next seven years, interest in sports medicine among orthopaedists increased greatly. Don O’Donoghue, MD, approached the AAOS concerning the committee branching off and forming an affiliated, yet separate, society. On January 30, 1972, at the invitation of Dr. Donoghue, 58 orthopaedic surgeons involved in sports medicine gathered to discuss the creation of the new society. A total of 75 orthopaedists were invited, and these physicians make up the list of founding members of the society.

The founding members developed the mission of AOSSM: to hold a scientific meeting that would serve as a forum for presentation and publication of new ideas; to provide opportunities for physicians to meet and exchange ideas concerning research and the future of sports medicine; as well as to develop a high-quality publication controlled by the Society.

In 2013, Jo A. Hannafin, M.D., Ph.D., an orthopedic surgeon at Hospital for Special Surgery (HSS) in New York City, was named the first female president of AOSSM.

== AOSSM Members ==
AOSSM members are physicians and allied health professionals who demonstrate scientific leadership, involvement, and dedication in the daily practice of sports medicine. Members must demonstrate continuing active research and educational activities in the field of sports medicine. Such activities may include service as a team physician at any level of competition, involvement in the health of athletes, service to local, regional, national, and international competitions, and the presentation of scientific research papers at sports medicine meetings.

Members focus on the effects of exercise and the monitoring of its impact on active individuals of all ages, abilities, and levels of fitness. While many members treat high-profile athletes who play on professional teams, many also devote their practices to helping their community by treating players on the local high school or junior college team. Through research and advances in surgical and rehabilitation techniques, orthopaedic sports medicine specialists have been able to treat and rehabilitate athletes whose injuries were once career-ending and put them back in the game sooner.

Members are broken down into seven different groups: active members, associate members, candidate members, affiliate members, honorary members, emeritus members, and inactive members.

=== Active members ===
Active members are: U.S. or Canadian citizens who are orthopaedic surgeons specializing in sports medicine. They must:

1. Hold membership in the American Academy of Orthopaedic Surgeons or Canadian Orthopaedic Association or they must be eligible for certification by the American Board of Orthopaedic Surgery
2. Candidate applicants for active membership must be members for two (2) years.
3. Noncandidate applicants must practice exclusively in orthopaedic surgery for at least two (2) years in their current location of practice.
4. Must have attended an AOSSM Annual Meeting in the past five (5) years.
5. Demonstrate a significant contribution and commitment to sports medicine through the following criteria as it relates to their practice:

- Research and publication
- Submission and presentation of papers at sports medicine functions
- Education of persons providing healthcare to athletes
- Service as a team physician at any level of competition
- Continuing medical education in sports medicine
- Service to local, regional, national, and international athletic competitions
- Capacity to work with other members and contribute to the work of the Society
- Compliance with other uniform rules and criteria as established by the Board of Directors or Membership Committee

Active members are eligible to vote, and unless specified otherwise, hold office in the Society.

=== Associate Members ===
Associate members are: international orthopaedic surgeons practicing outside of the United States or Canada who are certified in orthopaedic surgery and members of their country's national orthopaedic organization, or osteopathic physicians not qualified to be Active Members but certified by the American Osteopathic Board of Orthopedic Surgery. They must:

- Practice exclusively in orthopaedic surgery for at least two (2) years in their current location of practice.
- Must have attended an AOSSM Annual Meeting in the past five (5) years.
- Demonstrate a significant contribution and commitment to sports medicine as required of active members and as otherwise established by the Board of Directors and Membership Committee

Associate members are not eligible to vote, hold office, or serve on the Board of Directors. They may act in an advisory capacity and unless specified otherwise, may serve on committees with vote.

=== Candidate Members ===
Candidate members are physicians who are enrolled in or have completed an Accreditation Council for Graduate Medical Education (ACGME) approved orthopaedic sports medicine fellowship in the United States or Canada. They must:

- Submit an application within the year of the fellowship or within one year of completion of an ACGME approved orthopaedic sports medicine fellowship program.
- Demonstrate a significant contribution and commitment to sports medicine as required of active members and as otherwise established by the Board of Directors and Membership Committee.

Candidate members are not eligible to vote, hold office, or serve on the Board of Directors. They may act in an advisory capacity and, unless specified otherwise, serve on committees with vote.

=== Affiliate Members ===
Affiliate members are physicians, surgeons, or allied health professionals not qualifying for other membership categories who are interested in or contributing to the knowledge of sports medicine. They must:

- Be practicing in their current location for at least two years;
- Must have attended an AOSSM Annual Meeting in the past five (5) years.

Affiliate members are not eligible to vote, hold office in the Society, or serve on the Board of Directors. They may act in an advisory capacity and unless specified otherwise may serve on committees with vote.

=== Honorary Members ===
Honorary members are those who do not meet the qualifications of Active, Associate, or Affiliate membership, but who have made special contributions to sports medicine. They are not eligible to vote, hold office in the Society, or serve as a member of the Board of Directors, but may act in an advisory capacity and, unless specified otherwise, may serve on committees with vote.

Nominees for honorary membership are submitted to the Board of Directors for consideration. A limited number of honorary members is determined by the Board of Directors.

=== Emeritus Members ===
Emeritus members are an active member or affiliate member who has reached the age of 65 and is no longer engaged in active medical practice due to age or health. Emeritus Members are not eligible to vote, hold office, or serve as a member of the Board of Directors but may act in an advisory capacity and unless specified otherwise serve on committees with vote.

=== Inactive Member ===
Inactive members are members or an allied health professional who have met the qualifications for any category of membership but are currently unable to practice medicine due to physical disability or such other reason acceptable to the Board of Directors. Inactive members are not eligible to vote, hold office, or serve as a member of the Board of Directors but may act in an advisory capacity and, unless specified otherwise, serve on committee with vote.

== AOSSM Meetings ==
The AOSSM Annual Meeting and AOSSM Specialty Day are two of the AOSSM’s main meetings. The AOSSM Annual Meeting is held once a year (usually at the end of June or beginning of July) and is a place for the Society’s members and Board of Directors to meet, as well as for educational courses and research to be presented. AOSSM Specialty Day is held during the American Academy of Orthopaedic Surgeons’ annual meeting. It is a one-day meeting that provides educational courses and presentations focused on sports medicine. The Society also hosts other meetings throughout the year focusing on particular injuries or sports specifics areas, such as football or hockey.

== AOSSM Publications ==
The AOSSM Web site houses a full Online Library of scientific and patient education materials. The AOSSM also has five print publications.

=== American Journal of Sports Medicine (AJSM) ===
American Journal of Sports Medicine is a monthly, peer-reviewed scientific journal, first published in 1974. It is the official publication of AOSSM, and is ranked 1st out of 63 journals in Orthopaedics and 5th out of 84 journals in Sport Sciences in Thomson Reuters’s 2012 Journal Citation Reports, with an Impact Factor of 4.439. The journal is published by SAGE Publishers.

=== Sports Health: A Multidisciplinary Approach ===
Sports Health (January 2009) is published bimonthly and is a collaborative publication from AOSSM, the American Medical Society for Sports Medicine (AMSSM), the National Athletic Trainers' Association (NATA), and the Sports Physical Therapy Section (SPTS). Sports Health is a resource for all medical professionals involved in the training and care of the competitive or recreational athlete. The journal is published by SAGE Publishers.

=== Sports Medicine Update ===
Sports Medicine Update is AOSSM's bimonthly publication and includes educational articles, Society news and research updates, resources, and new developments within the orthopaedic sports medicine community.

=== Sports Tips and In Motion: Active Living for All Ages ===
Both Sports Tips and In Motion are patient education publications. Sports Tips are one-page fact sheets on athletic related conditions and injuries. In Motion is a quarterly newsletter and features short articles focusing on sports medicine, fitness, and musculoskeletal issues for people of all ages.

== AOSSM Research Programs and Grants ==
AOSSM awards grants to researchers working on break-through treatments and investigations in sports medicine.

=== Young Investigators Grant ===
The Young Investigator Grant provides awards aimed at providing "seed money," or start-up funds, for pilot projects. The principal investigator must be an early career orthopaedic surgeon, fellow, or resident with interests in sports medicine research. Any investigative team seeking such a grant must include at least one member of AOSSM in good standing.

=== Sandy Kirkley Clinical Outcome Research Grant ===
Dr. Sandy Kirkley was an advocate for well-conducted, randomized controlled trials to evaluate the efficacy of interventions in orthopaedic sports medicine. She said that the field must "rise to the challenge of designing and implementing clinical trials that provide the same level of evidence in support of treatments as our nonsurgical colleagues demand." In honor and memory of Dr. Kirkley, AOSSM established a small grant that would provide start-up, "seed," or supplemental funding for an outcome research project or pilot study.

=== Career Development Award ===
AOSSM offers a per year supplement grant to sports medicine orthopaedic surgeons who have an active Career Development Award (K Award) from the National Institutes of Health (NIH). The purpose of this grant is to facilitate the research careers of orthopaedic surgeons who have completed training in sports medicine and who have a faculty position at an academic institution. The award is open to individuals regardless of time since training.

=== MARS Project ===
AOSSM has initiated the AOSSM Multi-Center ACL Revision Study (MARS), utilizing a grant from the Musculoskeletal Transplant Foundation (MTF). The study will evaluate outcome for patients undergoing revision ACL surgery and examine the predictors of outcome. The MARS project has been approved by the Institution Review Board(IRB) of the central coordinating site, Vanderbilt University.

=== MERI Project ===
The Multi-Center Evaluation of the Responsiveness of the IKDC (MERI) Study is designed to evaluate and compare the responsiveness to change of several measures commonly used in patients undergoing knee surgery: the International Knee Documentation Committee (IKDC) Subjective Knee Form, the WOMAC, the Cincinnati Knee Rating System, and the SF-36. The specific patient population targeted for this study are those individuals who receive any form of surgical articular cartilage repair procedure for at least one symptomatic full thickness (Outerbridge Grade III or IV) lesion of the femoral condyle or trochlea. These procedures can include debridement, marrow stimulation techniques such as microfracture, drilling or abrasion arthroplasty, osteochondral autograft or allograft transplantation, mosaicplasty or autologous cartilage implantation. Any surgeon who performs at least three of these procedures a year can be involved in the project.

== AOSSM Awards ==
Each year during the AOSSM Annual Meeting a variety of awards are presented for research and outstanding achievement in sports medicine.

=== AOSSM Hall of Fame ===
In 2001, AOSSM established the Hall of Fame to honor members of the orthopaedic sports medicine community who have contributed significantly to the specialty and set themselves apart. Being inducted into the Hall of Fame is one of the highest honors given to a Society member.

=== Robert E. Leach, MD Mr. Sports Medicine Award ===
This award is given to an individual who has provided outstanding service in the orthopaedic community, and made numerous contributions to the specialty of sports medicine.

=== Kennedy Lecture ===
This lectureship is named in honor of John C. Kennedy, MD, FRCS(C) a past president of AOSSM. This lecture is supported by a Kennedy Family Endowment and AJSM and is named by the current AOSSM President.

=== Thomas Brady Award ===
This award is given to an orthopaedic surgeon who has been dedicated to excellence in sports medicine on a local level, with local athletes.

=== Cabaud Memorial Award ===
This award is given to the paper that best exemplifies clinically relevant hypothesis-driven basic science research (hard or soft tissue biology, in vitro research, laboratory or "bench-type" research, or in vivo animal).

=== Excellence in Research Award ===
This award is given to the best paper submitted in any category to the Awards Committee with a primary author under the age of 40 at the time of the Annual Meeting.

=== NCAA Research ===
The award is given to the best paper submitted that pertains to the health, safety, and well-being of collegiate student-athletes.

=== O’Donoghue Sports Injury Research Award ===
This award is given to the best overall paper that deals with clinical based research or human in vivo research.

=== George D. Rovere Award ===
This award is given annually to an individual AOSSM member to recognize their contribution to sports medicine education throughout the years.

=== Hughston Award ===
This award is given for the most outstanding paper that appeared in AJSM, the year prior to the award. It was named after the founder of AJSM, Jack C. Hughston, MD.

=== Aircast Award ===
The Aircast Awards are given to the best paper in clinical science and the best paper in basic science submitted by a sports medicine fellow for the AOSSM Annual Meeting.

=== AOSSM Poster Award ===
Given during the AOSSM Annual Meeting for an outstanding poster presented during the meeting.

== AOSSM Member Doctor Directory ==
AOSSM member physicians are listed in the AOSSM Member Doctor Directory for the public's use. Searches can be done by physician’s last name or by city/state or country.
