= Arthroscopy Association of North America =

US medical education organization

The Arthroscopy Association of North America (AANA) is an Accredited Council for Continuing Medical Education approved organization which exists to promote, encourage, support and foster through continuing medical education functions, the development and dissemination of knowledge in the discipline of arthroscopic surgery. This is done to improve on the diagnosis and treatment of diseases and injuries of the musculo-skeletal system.

The objectives of AANA are met by continually assessing and evaluating the resources needed to implement the mission. The established mechanisms in place to accomplish the mission include a monitored membership process, a membership driven committee structure, the continuous development and refinement of psychomotor skills courses, and ownership, production and distribution of a peer reviewed journal. AANA conducts an annual fall course and an annual spring meeting. AANA has created a research fund from which annual grants are awarded. AANA produces a quarterly newsletter and has developed a Web site to facilitate communications with the membership and the global community.

The official journals of AANA are Arthroscopy: The Journal of Arthroscopic and Related Surgery and Arthroscopy Techniques.

Until 2017, AANA jointly participated in the biannual Robert W. Metcalf, MD Memorial Meeting which provided 26 hours of continuing medical education for arthroscopic practitioners. Over seventeen thousand physicians attended the Metcalf Arthroscopy meeting event since its inception in 1978.
